= List of Israeli Premier League seasons =

The Israeli Premier League is an Israeli league for professional football clubs. It is the country's leading football competition and forms the highest level of the Israeli football league system. The competition began in the 1999–2000 season, following the decision of the Israeli Football Association to form a new league. As of 2011, twelve Premier League seasons have been completed, although only four clubs have been crowned champions. Maccabi Haifa have won the league seven times, Hapoel Tel Aviv and Beitar Jerusalem two times each, and Maccabi Tel Aviv once. The reigning champions are Maccabi Haifa, who won their seventh Premier League title (twelve top division title) in the 2009–10 season.

== History ==
After several years of discussion over the possibility of a so-called "Super League" being formed by Israeli football's leading clubs, the Israeli Premier League came into existence in 1999 when the top clubs broke away from the 44-year-old Liga Leumit. Hapoel Tel Aviv won the first title in the 1999–2000 season, the first time the club had won the championship of Israeli football for 11 years.

The record for the most points accumulated in a Premier League season belongs to Maccabi Haifa, who accumulated 87 points over 35 games in the 2009–10 season (as 3 points for a win not including the playoff points cut, Hapoel Tel Aviv accumulated 85 points in a regular season). At the other end of the scale, Tzafririm Holon accumulated just 16 points in the 2000–01 season (Hapoel Petah Tikva accumulated 14 points but after receiving 4 points deduction in the 2010–11 season). Tzafririm Holon also hold the record for the most goals conceded in a season, having conceded 85 goals in the same season, while Maccabi Haifa hold the record for the fewest goals conceded, with just 16 in the 2009–10 season.

Hapoel Tel Aviv hold the record for the most goals scored in a season, having scored 87 goals in the 2009–10 season, while Ironi Kiryat Shmona, in the 2008–09 season, and Hapoel Ramat Gan, in the 2010–11, are having the record for the fewest goals scored, with just 24.

== Seasons ==
Season	Winner	Relegated from the Israeli Premier League	Promoted to the Israeli Premier League	Top Scorer	
Season	Winner	Relegated from the Israeli Premier League	Promoted to the Israeli Premier League	Player	Goals
1999–2000	Hapoel Tel Aviv	Hapoel Kfar Saba; Maccabi Herzliya; Hapoel Jerusalem	Hapoel Tzafririm Holon	Assi Tubi (Maccabi Petah Tikva)	27
2000–01	Maccabi Haifa	Bnei Yehuda; Tzafririm Holon	Hapoel Be'er Sheva; Maccabi Kiryat Gat	Avi Nimni (Maccabi Tel Aviv)	25
2001–02	Maccabi Haifa	Hapoel Haifa; Maccabi Kiryat Gat	Hapoel Kfar Saba; Bnei Yehuda	Kobi Refua (Maccabi Petah Tikva)	18
2002–03	Maccabi Tel Aviv	Hapoel Kfar Saba; Ironi Rishon LeZion	Maccabi Ahi Nazareth; Bnei Sakhnin	Yaniv Abargil (Hapoel Kfar Saba); Shay Holtzman (Ironi Rishon LeZion / F.C. Ashdod)	18
2003–04	Maccabi Haifa	Maccabi Netanya; Maccabi Ahi Nazareth	Hapoel Haifa; Hapoel Nazareth Illit	Ofir Haim (Hapoel Be'er Sheva); Shay Holtzman (F.C. Ashdod)	16
2004–05	Maccabi Haifa	Hapoel Haifa; Hapoel Be'er Sheva	Hapoel Kfar Saba; Maccabi Netanya	Roberto Colautti (Maccabi Haifa)	19
2005–06	Maccabi Haifa	Hapoel Nazareth Illit; Bnei Sakhnin	Maccabi Herzliya; Hakoah Amidar Ramat Gan	Shay Holtzman (F.C. Ashdod)	18
2006–07	Beitar Jerusalem	Hakoah Amidar Ramat Gan; Hapoel Petah Tikva	Ironi Kiryat Shmona; Bnei Sakhnin	Yaniv Azran (F.C. Ashdod)	15
2007–08	Beitar Jerusalem	Hapoel Kfar Saba; Maccabi Herzliya	Hakoah Amidar Ramat Gan; Hapoel Petah Tikva	Samuel Yeboah (Hapoel Kfar Saba)	15
2008–09	Maccabi Haifa	Hakoah Amidar Ramat Gan; Ironi Kiryat Shmona	Hapoel Haifa; Hapoel Acre; Hapoel Be'er Sheva; Hapoel Ramat Gan; Hapoel Ra'anana	Barak Yitzhaki (Beitar Jerusalem); Shimon Abuhatzira (Hapoel Petah Tikva); Eliran Atar (Bnei Yehuda Tel Aviv)	14
2009–10	Hapoel Tel Aviv	Hapoel Ra'anana; Maccabi Ahi Nazareth	Ironi Kiryat Shmona; Hapoel Ashkelon	Shlomi Arbeitman (Maccabi Haifa)	28
2010–11	Maccabi Haifa	Hapoel Petah Tikva; Hapoel Ashkelon; Hapoel Ramat Gan	Ironi Ramat HaSharon; Ironi Rishon LeZion; Hapoel Kfar Saba	Toto Tamuz (Hapoel Tel Aviv)	21
