= Nir Davidovich =

Israeli footballer

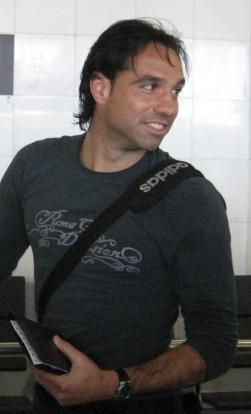

Personal information
- Date of birth: 17 December 1976 (age 49)
- Place of birth: Haifa, Israel
- Height: 1.87 m (6 ft 1 1/2 in)
- Position: Goalkeeper

Youth career
- 1986–1994: Maccabi Haifa

Senior career*
Years	Team	Apps	(Gls)
1994–2013	Maccabi Haifa	386	(0)

International career^{‡}
1995–1997	Israel U21	19	(0)
1998–2010	Israel	51	(0)

Managerial career
- 2013–2016: Israel U-21 (goalkeeping coach)
- 2013–2016: Maccabi Haifa (goalkeeping coach) (youth)
- 2016–: Israel (goalkeeping coach)
- 2017–2020: Maccabi Haifa (goalkeeping coach)
- 2021 -: Hapoel Tel Aviv (goalkeeping coach)
- * Club domestic league appearances and goals as of 4 June 2017 ‡ National team caps and goals as of 06:36, 19 September 2010 (UTC)

Nir Davidovich (Hebrew: ניר דוידוביץ'; also spelled Davidovitch; born 17 December 1976) is an Israeli former professional footballer who played as a goalkeeper. His honours are 7 championships, 2 Israeli cups, 3 Toto Cups, 1 MVP of the season.

At club level, Davidovich spent his whole career in Maccabi Haifa. He suffered from 3 serious injuries, but managed to recover and lead the team to its 8th championship, winning the MVP title in 2004. He is considered a "symbol" of the club along with the veteran captain Yaniv Katan. Many talk about him as the successor of legendary goalkeeper Avi Ran, a Maccabi Haifa prodigy who died in a diving accident.

At international level, he was the number one goalkeeper in the Israel national team for a time.

== Early life ==
Davidovich was born in Haifa, Israel, to a Jewish family. His father is footballer Benjamin Davidovich.

== Football career ==
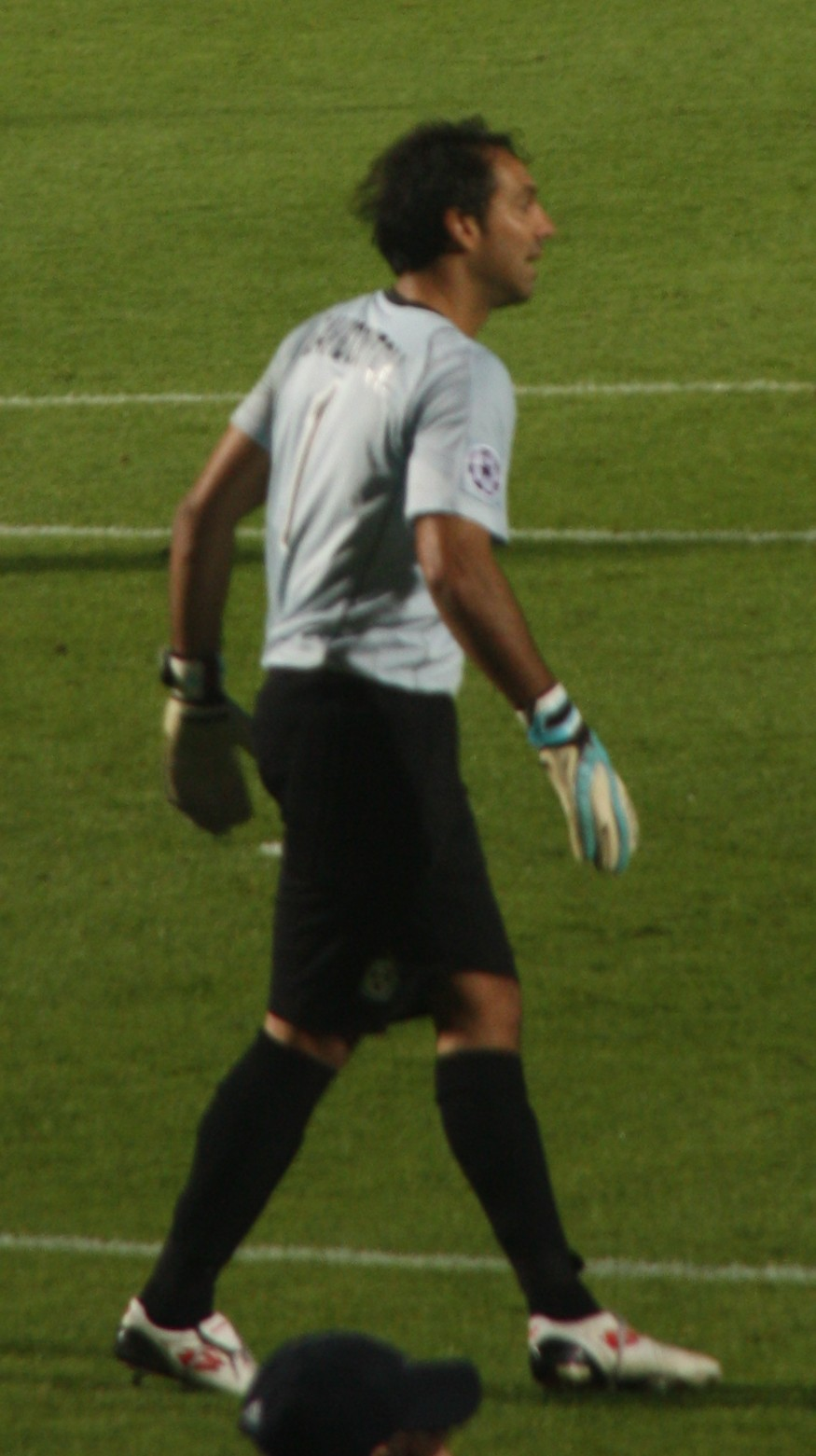
Nir Davidovich in Maccabi Haifa's UEFA Champions League match against FC Girondins de Bordeaux.

- Played in each age-class youth national team of Israel.
- 1995: Promoted to senior team of Maccabi Haifa.
- 1996: Gave outstanding performance when Maccabi Haifa kept a 0–0 against Hapoel Petah Tikva after 3 (!) "greens" were sent off.
- 1997: Overcame veteran goalkeeper Bonni Ginzburg to become MHFC senior goalkeeper.
- 1998: First international appearance at Israel 4–0 victory over Turkey.
- 1998: Wins the Israeli cup after 2–0 victory over Hapoel Jerusalem.
- 1998: Excels in 1–1 draw against French top football club Paris Saint-Germain.
- 1999: Injured seriously in the crotch and missed the entire season.
- 2000–2001: Won the championship with Maccabi Haifa, conceding only 28 goals (the lowest in that season).
- 2001: Injured in his knee in the match versus Spain, where he kept the Israeli goal clean until he was replaced in half-time.
- 2002: Missed most of the season because of his knee injury.
- 2003: Recovered from knee injury and played the final matches in the league.
- 2003: Excelled in MHFC 0:0 draw against Valencia. After his performance he received grades of 10 in the Israeli press (just seven players received grade of 10 in the history of the Israeli press) and was dubbed "The Octopus" by the Spanish press.
- 2003–2004: Won the championship with Maccabi Haifa and chosen by player, press and coaches as the MVP of the season.
- 2004: saves a penalty kick as Israel beat Cyprus 2–1 in a 2006 FIFA World Cup qualifier.
- 2009: On 19 April Davidovich made his 300th league appearance in Maccabi Haifa.
- 2009: First time in the UEFA Champions League with Maccabi Haifa.
- 2010: Davidovich and Maccabi Haifa conceded only 16 goals in 35 league games, breaking the national record of lowest average goals per games.
- 2013: Nir Davidovich retired from football as a player. Throughout his career he played in Maccabi Haifa F.C., 18 years of the Club Concierge.

== Career statistics ==
Club performance			League		Cup		League Cup		Continental		Total	
Season	Club	League	Apps	Goals	Apps	Goals	Apps	Goals	Apps	Goals	Apps	Goals
Israel			League		Israel State Cup		Toto Cup		Europe		Total	
1995–96	Maccabi Haifa	Liga Leumit	7	0	2	0	0	0	0	0	9	0
1996–97	Maccabi Haifa	Liga Leumit	17	0	3	0	0	0	0	0	20	0
1997–98	Maccabi Haifa	Liga Leumit	30	0	5	0	0	0	0	0	35	0
1998–99	Maccabi Haifa	Liga Leumit	26	0	0	0	0	0	8	0	34	0
1999–2000	Maccabi Haifa	Israeli Premier League	23	0	1	0	0	0	0	0	24	0
2000–01	Maccabi Haifa	Israeli Premier League	37	0	4	0	0	0	3	0	45	0
2001–02	Maccabi Haifa	Israeli Premier League	2	0	0	0	0	0	0	0	2	0
2002–03	Maccabi Haifa	Israeli Premier League	3	0	0	0	0	0	0	0	3	0
2003–04	Maccabi Haifa	Israeli Premier League	33	0	3	0	0	0	6	0	42	0
2004–05	Maccabi Haifa	Israeli Premier League	18	0	0	0	0	0	4	0	22	0
2005–06	Maccabi Haifa	Israeli Premier League	31	0	4	0	0	0	2	0	37	0
2006–07	Maccabi Haifa	Israeli Premier League	26	0	6	0	0	0	12	0	41	0
2007–08	Maccabi Haifa	Israeli Premier League	30	0	2	0	0	0	0	0	32	0
2008–09	Maccabi Haifa	Israeli Premier League	22	0	5	0	0	0	0	0	28	0
2009–10	Maccabi Haifa	Israeli Premier League	35	0	2	0	0	0	12	0	49	0
Total	Israel		385	0	43	0	0	0	59	0	535	0
Career total			385	0	43	0	0	0	59	0	535	0

== Honours ==
=== Club ===
Maccabi Haifa

Israeli Premier League (7):

- 2000–01, 2001–02, 2003–04, 2004–05, 2005–06, 2008–09, 2010–11

Israel State Cup (2):

- 1995, 1998

Toto Cup Top Division (3):

- 2002-03, 2005–06, 2007–08

=== Individual ===
Maccabi Haifa

- Footballer of the Year in Israel (1): 2004

== See also ==
- List of one-club men
