= Abed Rabah =

Israeli footballer

Abed Rabah עבד רבאח
Personal information
- Date of birth: 9 June 1975 (age 51)
- Place of birth: Arraba, Israel
- Position: Right back

Team information
- Current team: Ahva Arraba

Youth career
- Hapoel Arraba

Senior career*
Years	Team	Apps	(Gls)
1992–1998	Hapoel Arraba	-	(-)
1998–2001	Bnei Sakhnin	-	(-)
2001–2004	Hapoel Petah Tikva	98	(3)
2004–2008	Bnei Sakhnin	128	(3)
2008–2015	Ahva Arraba	188	(10)
2019–2023	Hapoel Arraba	38	(1)

International career
2002–2004	Israel	3	(0)
- * Club domestic league appearances and goals

Abed Rabah (Hebrew: עאבד רבאח, Arabic: عبد رباح; born 9 June 1975) is an Israeli former professional footballer.

== Biography ==
Rabah is a graduate of the Technion in Haifa. There he was trained as a building engineer.

== Playing career ==
Before the start of the 2008/09 season, Bnei Sakhnin was drawn against Spanish club Deportivo de La Coruña in the Intertoto Cup after defeating FK Renova in round two. When the team took off from Ben Gurion International Airport for the second leg in A Coruña, Abed Rabah was among a group of players stopped in the airport for allegedly stealing perfumes.

After the Intertoto Cup matches, Rabah requested to leave Bnei Sakhnin for his youth club, Ahva Arraba. Sakhnin refused to release him from his contract until they found a suitable replacement. As soon as Eitan Azaria signed with Sakhnin, Rabah was released on free transfer to Arraba.

== Statistics ==
Club	Season	League		Cup		League Cup		Continental		Other		Total		
Club	Season	Apps	Goals	Apps	Goals	Apps	Goals	Apps	Goals	Apps	Goals	Apps	Goals	
Hapoel Arraba	1992-93													
Hapoel Arraba	1993-94													
Hapoel Arraba	1994-95													
Hapoel Arraba	1995-96													
Hapoel Arraba	1996-97													
Hapoel Arraba	1997-98													
Hapoel Arraba	Total	-	-	-	-	-	-	-	-	-	-	-	-	
Bnei Sakhnin	1998-99													
Bnei Sakhnin	1999-00													
Bnei Sakhnin	2000-01													
Bnei Sakhnin	Total	-	-	-	-	-	-	-	-	-	-	-	-	
Hapoel Petah Tikva	2001-02	33	3	4	0	2	0	-	–	-	-	39	3	
Hapoel Petah Tikva	2002-03	33	0	1	0	5	0	-	–	-	-	39	0	
Hapoel Petah Tikva	2003-04	32	0	6	0	1	0	-	–	-	-	39	0	
Hapoel Petah Tikva	Total	98	3	11	0	8	0	-	-	-	-	117	3	
Bnei Sakhnin	2004-05	32	1	-	-	-	-	-	–	-	-	-	-	
Bnei Sakhnin	2005-06	31	1	-	-	-	-	-	–	-	-	-	-	
Bnei Sakhnin	2006-07	32	1	3	0	8	0	–		0	0	43	1	
Bnei Sakhnin	2007-08	33	0	1	0	9	0	–		-	-	44	0	
Bnei Sakhnin	Total	128	3	-	-	-	-	-	-	-	-	-	-	
Ahva Arraba	2008-09	21	4	2	0	1	0	0	0	0	0	24	4	
Ahva Arraba	Career total		-	-	-	-	-	-	-	-	-	-	-	-
