= 2000–01 Toto Cup Al =

Toto Cup Al
- Season: 2000–01
- Champions: Hapoel Haifa

The 2000–01 Toto Cup Al was the 17th season of the third most important football tournament in Israel since its introduction. This was the second edition to be played with clubs of both Israeli Premier League and Liga Leumit clubs.

The competition began on 4 August 2000 and ended on 23 January 2001, with Hapoel Haifa beating Beitar Jerusalem 1–0 in the final.

== Results ==
=== First round ===
Team 1	Agg.	Team 2	1st leg	2nd leg
Beitar Be'er Sheva	2–4	Ironi Rishon LeZion	2–2	0–2
Bnei Sakhnin	0–9	Hapoel Jerusalem	0–5	0–4
Bnei Yehuda	2–1	Maccabi Kiryat Gat	0–1	2–0
Hapoel Beit She'an	3–2	Hapoel Ramat Gan	2–1	1–1
Hapoel Tzafririm Holon	4–7	Hapoel Kfar Saba	1–3	3–4
Maccabi Ahi Nazareth	2–4	Hakoah Ramat Gan	1–0	1–4
Maccabi Herzliya	3–1	Maccabi Ironi Kiryat Ata	2–1	1–0
Maccabi Netanya	4–2	Hapoel Be'er Sheva	0–2	4–0

=== Second round ===
Team 1	Agg.	Team 2	1st leg	2nd leg
Hapoel Haifa	4–1	Ironi Rishon LeZion	4–0	0–1
Bnei Yehuda	1–0	Hapoel Tel Aviv	0–0	1–0
Maccabi Herzliya	4–8	Beitar Jerusalem	0–4	4–4
Hakoah Ramat Gan	(a) 3–3	F.C. Ashdod	1–1	2–2
Maccabi Haifa	3–5	Hapoel Petah Tikva	1–4	2–1
Hapoel Kfar Saba	5–3	Maccabi Tel Aviv	3–1	2–2
Hapoel Jerusalem	2–7	Maccabi Petah Tikva	2–4	0–3
Hapoel Beit She'an	3–1	Maccabi Netanya	2–0	1–1

=== Quarter-finals ===
28 November 2000	Hapoel Haifa	3–0	Hapoel Petah Tikva	Haifa
	Aziz 14'; Turgeman 46'; Paço 87' (pen.)	Report		Stadium: Kiryat Eliezer Stadium; Referee: Eitan Tabrizi

28 November 2000	Maccabi Petah Tikva	2–3 (a.e.t.)	Hakoah Ramat Gan	Petah Tikva
	Holtzman 37'; Partieli 90'	Report	Suisa 65', 86'; Zrihan 114'	Stadium: Municipal Stadium

28 November 2000	Hapoel Kfar Saba	0–1	Bnei Yehuda	Kfar Saba
		Report	Shirazi 45'	Stadium: Levita Stadium; Attendance: 500; Referee: Shmiel Schteif

12 December 2000	Hapoel Beit She'an	2–3 (a.e.t.)	Beitar Jerusalem	Beit She'an
18:00	Danan 43'; Gutiérrez 87'	Report	Abargil 35'; Roso 39'; Abukasis 111'	Stadium: Municipal Stadium; Attendance: 3,000

=== Semifinals ===
26 December 2000	Hapoel Haifa	1–0	Hakoah Ramat Gan	Ramat Gan
14:30	Minteuan 25'	Report; Video		Stadium: Ramat Gan Stadium

26 December 2000	Beitar Jerusalem	3–2 (a.e.t.)	Bnei Yehuda	Ramat Gan
17:00	Abukasis 10', 113' (pen.); Sándor 26'	Report; Video	Shirazi 2'; Javornik 35'	Stadium: Ramat Gan Stadium

=== Final ===
23 January 2001

Hapoel Haifa	1–0	Beitar Jerusalem
Ben Shimon 45'	Report

Ramat Gan Stadium
Attendance: 10,000
Referee: Eyal Tzur

== See also ==
- 2000–01 Toto Cup Artzit
