= 2002–03 Toto Cup Al =

Toto Cup Al
- Season: 2002–03
- Champions: Maccabi Haifa

The 2002–03 Toto Cup Al was the 19th season of the third most important football tournament in Israel since its introduction. This was the 4th edition to be played with clubs of both Israeli Premier League and Liga Leumit clubs.

The competition began on 9 August 2002 and ended on 20 May 2003, with Maccabi Haifa beating Hapoel Tel Aviv 2–0 in the final.

== Format change ==
The 24 Israeli Premier League and Liga Leumit clubs were divided into four groups, each with six clubs, with the top two teams advancing to the quarter-finals.

== Group stage ==
The matches were played from 9 August 2002 to 27 January 2003.

=== Group A ===
Pos	Team	Pld	W	D	L	GF	GA	GD	Pts	MHA	MAN	HPT	HRA	HHA	HRL
1	Maccabi Haifa (A)	10	7	0	3	23	12	+11	21	—	1–2	5–0	3–1	1–0	3–1
2	Maccabi Ahi Nazareth (A)	10	6	1	3	22	20	+2	19	1–0	—	1–4	2–0	3–1	4–2
3	Hapoel Petah Tikva	10	6	1	3	18	20	−2	19	1–5	5–4	—	1–2	2–1	1–0
4	Hapoel Ra'anana	10	3	2	5	13	17	−4	11	4–1	1–3	0–0	—	0–2	2–3
5	Hapoel Haifa	10	3	0	7	12	13	−1	9	1–2	4–0	0–1	0–1	—	3–0
6	Hapoel Rishon LeZion	10	2	2	6	16	22	−6	8	1–2	2–2	2–3	2–2	3–0	—

Source: rsssf.com (in Hebrew)
Legend: Blue = home team win; Yellow = draw; Red = away team win.
Rules for classification: 1st points; 2nd goal difference; 3rd matches won; 4th goals scored; 5th head-to-head; 6th decision match
(A) Advanced to the Semifinals

=== Group B ===
Pos	Team	Pld	W	D	L	GF	GA	GD	Pts	HTA	HNI	MKK	MNE	MKG	BnY
1	Hapoel Tel Aviv (A)	10	6	3	1	23	5	+18	21	—	3–0	4–1	4–0	4–0	2–2
2	Hapoel Nazareth Illit (A)	10	5	2	3	16	15	+1	17	1–0	—	0–2	4–1	0–0	3–3
3	Maccabi Kafr Kanna	10	4	3	3	16	16	0	15	1–1	0–3	—	4–2	1–2	1–1
4	Maccabi Netanya	10	4	2	4	15	17	−2	14	0–0	3–0	1–3	—	1–0	0–0
5	Maccabi Kiryat Gat	10	1	4	5	7	18	−11	7	0–2	1–2	1–1	0–4	—	2–2
6	Bnei Yehuda	10	0	6	4	14	20	−6	6	0–3	2–3	1–2	2–3	1–1	—

Source: rsssf.com (in Hebrew)
Legend: Blue = home team win; Yellow = draw; Red = away team win.
Rules for classification: 1st points; 2nd goal difference; 3rd matches won; 4th goals scored; 5th head-to-head; 6th decision match
(A) Advanced to the Semifinals

=== Group C ===
Pos	Team	Pld	W	D	L	GF	GA	GD	Pts	MTA	MPT	BEI	HRG	BnS	MHE
1	Maccabi Tel Aviv (A)	10	8	1	1	26	11	+15	25	—	2–1	3–0	5–0	2–1	3–1
2	Maccabi Petah Tikva (A)	10	6	2	2	18	11	+7	20	2–4	—	5–1	0–0	1–0	2–1
3	Beitar Jerusalem	10	3	4	3	13	15	−2	13	3–0	0–0	—	3–1	1–1	3–1
4	Hapoel Ramat Gan	10	3	2	5	8	15	−7	11	0–2	1–2	2–0	—	2–0	1–0
5	Bnei Sakhnin	10	1	4	5	8	14	−6	7	1–3	1–3	1–1	2–0	—	1–1
6	Maccabi Herzliya	10	0	5	5	9	16	−7	5	2–2	1–2	1–1	1–1	0–0	—

Source: rsssf.com (in Hebrew)
Legend: Blue = home team win; Yellow = draw; Red = away team win.
Rules for classification: 1st points; 2nd goal difference; 3rd matches won; 4th goals scored; 5th head-to-head; 6th decision match
(A) Advanced to the Semifinals

=== Group D ===
On 29 August 2002 Hakoah Ramat Gan was demoted to Liga Artzit and was replaced by Hapoel Tzafririm Holon. As a result, the two matches played by Hakoah Ramat Gan before the club was demoted were annulled.

Pos	Team	Pld	W	D	L	GF	GA	GD	Pts	HTZ	ASH	HBS	HKS	BBS	HJE
1	Hapoel Tzafririm Holon (A)	10	7	0	3	19	14	+5	21	—	0–3	2–0	1–0	2–0	5–2
2	F.C. Ironi Ashdod (A)	10	6	2	2	20	13	+7	20	1–2	—	2–1	0–4	0–0	4–1
3	Hapoel Be'er Sheva	10	5	0	5	19	15	+4	15	1–2	1–2	—	3–0	4–2	6–2
4	Hapoel Kfar Saba	10	3	2	5	12	13	−1	11	1–3	0–3	0–1	—	1–1	2–2
5	Beitar Be'er Sheva	10	2	4	4	19	19	0	10	3–1	3–3	2–0	0–2	—	1–4
6	Hapoel Jerusalem	10	2	2	6	27	27	0	8	3–1	1–2	1–2	3–0	2–2	—

Source: rsssf.com (in Hebrew)
Legend: Blue = home team win; Yellow = draw; Red = away team win.
Rules for classification: 1st points; 2nd goal difference; 3rd matches won; 4th goals scored; 5th head-to-head; 6th decision match
(A) Advanced to the Semifinals

== Knockout rounds ==
=== Quarter-finals ===
18 February 2003	Maccabi Haifa	3–1	Maccabi Petah Tikva	Haifa
	Cohen 33', 55'; Badir 36'	Report	Alberman 65'	Stadium: Kiryat Eliezer Stadium

18 February 2003	F.C. Ashdod	0–0 (a.e.t.) (4–5 p)	Hapoel Tel Aviv	Ashdod
		Report		Stadium: Yud Alef Stadium

18 February 2003	Maccabi Ahi Nazareth	0–0 (a.e.t.) (5–6 p)	Hapoel Nazareth Illit	Ilut
		Report		Stadium: Ilut Stadium

19 February 2003	Hapoel Tzafririm Holon	0–2	Maccabi Tel Aviv
			Dego 53', 86'

=== Semifinals ===
15 April 2003	Hapoel Tel Aviv	3–1	Hapoel Nazareth Illit	Ramat Gan
15:45	Balili 16', 59'; Hadad 89'	Report	Nyilas 45'	Stadium: Ramat Gan Stadium

15 April 2003	Maccabi Haifa	3–2	Maccabi Tel Aviv	Ramat Gan
18:30	Tal 72'; Katan 84'; Barda 90'	Report	Prohorenkovs 6'; Biton 62'	Stadium: Ramat Gan Stadium

=== Final ===
20 May 2003
18:30

Hapoel Tel Aviv	0–2	Maccabi Haifa
	Report	Cohen 12'; Nagar 45'

Ramat Gan Stadium

== See also ==
- 2002–03 Toto Cup Artzit
