= 2002–03 Israeli Premier League =

Israeli Premier League
- Season: 2002–03
- Champions: Maccabi Tel Aviv; 18th title
- Relegated: Hapoel Kfar Saba; Hapoel Rishon LeZion
- Top goalscorer: Shay Holtzman / Yaniv Abargil (18 goals)

The 2002–03 Israeli Premier League season saw Maccabi Tel Aviv win the title. It took place from the first match on 14 September 2002 to the final match on 31 May 2003.

Two teams from Liga Leumit were promoted at the end of the previous season: Hapoel Kfar Saba and Bnei Yehuda. The two teams relegated were Hapoel Haifa and Maccabi Kiryat Gat.

== Teams and Locations ==
Locations of the 2002–03 Israeli Premier League teams

Twelve teams took part in the 2002-03 Israeli Premier League season, including ten teams from the 2001-02 season, as well as two teams that were promoted from the 2001-02 Liga Leumit.

Hapoel Kfar Saba were promoted as champions of the 2001-02 Liga Leumit. Bnei Yehuda were promoted as runners up. Bnei Yehuda and Hapoel Kfar Saba returned to the top flight after an absence of one and two seasons respectively.

Hapoel Haifa and Maccabi Kiryat Gat were relegated after finishing in the bottom two places in the 2001-02 season.

Club	Stadium	Capacity
Beitar Jerusalem	Teddy Stadium	21,600
Bnei Yehuda	Bloomfield Stadium	15,700
Hapoel Tel Aviv	Bloomfield Stadium	15,700
Maccabi Tel Aviv	Bloomfield Stadium	15,700
Maccabi Haifa	Kiryat Eliezer Stadium	14,002
Hapoel Be'er Sheva	Vasermil Stadium	13,000
F.C. Ashdod	Yud-Alef Stadium	7,800
Maccabi Netanya	Sar-Tov Stadium	7,500
Maccabi Petah Tikva	Petah Tikva Municipal Stadium	6,800
Hapoel Petah Tikva	Petah Tikva Municipal Stadium	6,800
Ironi Rishon LeZion	Haberfeld Stadium	6,000
Hapoel Kfar Saba	Levita Stadium	5,800

Beitar Jerusalem	Bnei Yehuda Hapoel Tel Aviv Maccabi Tel Aviv	Hapoel Be'er Sheva
Teddy Stadium	Bloomfield Stadium	Vasermil Stadium
Maccabi Haifa	Maccabi Petah Tikva Hapoel Petah Tikva	F.C. Ashdod
Kiryat Eliezer Stadium	Petah Tikva Municipal Stadium	Yud-Alef Stadium
Maccabi Netanya	Ironi Rishon LeZion	Hapoel Kfar Saba
Sar-Tov Stadium	Haberfeld Stadium	Levita Stadium

== Final table ==
Pos	Team	Pld	W	D	L	GF	GA	GD	Pts	Qualification or relegation
1	Maccabi Tel Aviv (C)	33	22	3	8	66	31	+35	69	Qualification for the Champions League second qualifying round
2	Maccabi Haifa	33	21	6	6	75	42	+33	69	Qualification for the UEFA Cup qualifying round
3	Hapoel Tel Aviv	33	19	10	4	53	22	+31	67	Qualification for the UEFA Cup qualifying round
4	Maccabi Netanya	33	15	9	9	47	36	+11	54	Qualification for the Intertoto Cup first round
5	Hapoel Be'er Sheva	33	15	6	12	56	41	+15	51	
6	Maccabi Petah Tikva	33	13	11	9	45	37	+8	50	
7	F.C. Ashdod	33	11	7	15	35	49	−14	40	
8	Hapoel Petah Tikva	33	11	6	16	41	53	−12	39	
9	Beitar Jerusalem	33	10	6	17	46	59	−13	36	
10	Bnei Yehuda	33	9	7	17	39	63	−24	34	
11	Hapoel Kfar Saba (Note: Deducted 3 points) (R)	33	7	5	21	43	81	−38	23	Relegation to Liga Leumit
12	Ironi Rishon LeZion (R)	33	4	6	23	35	67	−32	18	Relegation to Liga Leumit

Source: RSSSF; Futbol24.com
(C) Champions; (R) Relegated

== Results ==
=== First and second round ===
Home \ Away	BEI	BnY	ASH	HBS	HKS	HPT	HTA	IRZ	MHA	MNE	MPT	MTA
Beitar Jerusalem	—	2–3	5–0	1–4	1–0	0–0	0–1	2–0	4–0	1–1	1–3	2–1
Bnei Yehuda	1–0	—	2–1	0–0	2–3	1–2	1–4	4–1	1–3	1–2	1–3	2–0
F.C. Ashdod	0–0	1–1	—	2–2	0–5	2–0	0–0	2–1	2–3	2–1	2–0	0–1
Hapoel Be'er Sheva	2–0	2–3	3–0	—	1–2	4–0	0–2	1–0	2–0	2–1	2–0	1–0
Hapoel Kfar Saba	1–3	0–1	0–2	3–1	—	0–2	1–1	1–0	1–3	2–1	1–3	0–3
Hapoel Petah Tikva	0–0	1–0	0–0	0–1	1–3	—	2–3	2–3	1–1	2–1	1–3	1–2
Hapoel Tel Aviv	2–0	3–0	1–0	1–0	2–1	2–1	—	1–1	1–2	2–0	0–0	3–1
Ironi Rishon LeZion	4–0	2–3	1–0	1–1	2–2	0–3	1–2	—	0–3	0–2	1–1	0–1
Maccabi Haifa	0–1	5–2	1–0	4–2	5–0	3–1	1–1	4–3	—	2–1	3–1	2–3
Maccabi Netanya	1–1	1–0	0–0	1–0	4–1	1–0	2–2	2–1	0–0	—	0–0	3–1
Maccabi Petah Tikva	5–1	2–0	1–0	1–1	3–3	0–3	0–0	0–0	0–1	1–1	—	0–1
Maccabi Tel Aviv	4–1	1–0	4–1	0–3	3–0	5–1	1–0	2–1	0–1	5–0	4–2	—

Source: RSSSF
Legend: Blue = home team win; Yellow = draw; Red = away team win.

=== Third round ===
Home \ Away	BEI	BnY	ASH	HBS	HKS	HPT	HTA	IRZ	MHA	MNE	MPT	MTA
Beitar Jerusalem	—	4–1	—	—	4–2	—	—	—	3–4	0–2	—	2–3
Bnei Yehuda	—	—	0–0	2–2	—	0–0	1–3	—	—	—	1–4	—
F.C. Ashdod	2–1	—	—	—	—	2–1	—	—	1–5	2–0	—	0–3
Hapoel Be'er Sheva	3–2	—	0–1	—	—	1–2	0–1	5–1	—	3–3	—	—
Hapoel Kfar Saba	—	1–1	2–5	1–2	—	—	1–6	—	—	—	0–1	—
Hapoel Petah Tikva	4–1	—	—	—	2–0	—	—	—	0–5	3–2	—	0–3
Hapoel Tel Aviv	4–1	—	1–0	—	—	1–1	—	2–0	—	0–1	—	0–0
Ironi Rishon LeZion	1–1	1–2	2–4	—	5–2	0–3	—	—	—	—	—	—
Maccabi Haifa	—	2–2	—	3–1	5–1	—	1–1	2–1	—	—	1–1	—
Maccabi Netanya	—	2–0	—	—	4–1	—	—	2–0	2–0	—	1–1	2–0
Maccabi Petah Tikva	0–1	—	2–1	1–3	—	3–1	1–0	2–1	—	—	—	—
Maccabi Tel Aviv	—	5–0	—	2–1	2–2	—	—	3–0	2–0	—	0–0	—

Source: RSSSF
Legend: Blue = home team win; Yellow = draw; Red = away team win.

== Top goal scorers ==
Rank	Player	Club	Goals
1	(Israel) Shay Holtzman	Ironi Rishon LeZion / F.C. Ashdod	18
1	(Israel) Yaniv Abargil	Hapoel Kfar Saba	18
3	(Israel) Kobi Refua	Maccabi Petah Tikva	15
4	(Israel) Alon Mizrahi	Hapoel Kfar Saba	14
4	(Israel) Avi Nimni	Maccabi Tel Aviv	14
4	(Israel) Michael Zandberg	Maccabi Haifa	14
7	(Bulgaria) Vladimir Andonov	Bnei Yehuda	12
7	(Israel) Manor Hassan	Hapoel Petah Tikva	12
7	(Poland) Andrzej Kubica	Beitar Jerusalem	12
10	(Israel) Lior Asulin	Maccabi Petah Tikva	11
10	(Croatia) Đovani Roso	Maccabi Haifa	11
10	(Israel) Itzik Zohar	Beitar Jerusalem	11

Source: RSSSF

== See also ==
- 2002–03 Toto Cup Al
