= 2003–04 Israeli Premier League =

Israeli Premier League
- Season: 2003–04
- Champions: Maccabi Haifa; 8th title
- Relegated: Maccabi Ahi Nazareth; Maccabi Netanya
- Top goalscorer: Shay Holtzman / Ofir Haim (16 goals)

The 2003–04 Israeli Premier League season was held between 13 September 2003 and 22 May 2004, continuing a continuation of the top division football competition that started in 1931 and continues to the present day (as at 2025). In the 2003-04 season there were two Israeli Arab clubs in the top division for the first time; being Maccabi Ahi Nazareth and Bnei Sakhnin.

Maccabi Haifa won the title, whilst Nazareth and Maccabi Netanya were relegated. Bnei Sakhnin (who qualified for Europe by winning the State Cup) became the first Arab club to spend more than a single season in the top flight.

== Teams and Locations ==
Locations of the 2003–04 Israeli Premier League teams

Twelve teams took part in the 2003–04 Israeli Premier League season, including ten teams from the 2002-03 season, as well as two teams which were promoted from the 2002-03 Liga Leumit.

Maccabi Ahi Nazareth were promoted as champions of the 2002-03 Liga Leumit. Bnei Sakhnin were promoted as runners up. Both made their debut in the top flight.

Hapoel Kfar Saba and Ironi Rishon LeZion were relegated after finishing in the bottom two places in the 2002-03 season.

Club	Stadium	Capacity
Beitar Jerusalem	Teddy Stadium	21,600
Bnei Yehuda	Bloomfield Stadium	15,700
Hapoel Tel Aviv	Bloomfield Stadium	15,700
Maccabi Tel Aviv	Bloomfield Stadium	15,700
Maccabi Haifa	Kiryat Eliezer Stadium	14,002
Bnei Sakhnin^{[A]}	Kiryat Eliezer Stadium	14,002
Hapoel Be'er Sheva	Vasermil Stadium	13,000
F.C. Ashdod	Yud-Alef Stadium	7,800
Maccabi Netanya	Sar-Tov Stadium	7,500
Maccabi Petah Tikva	Petah Tikva Municipal Stadium	6,800
Hapoel Petah Tikva	Petah Tikva Municipal Stadium	6,800
Maccabi Ahi Nazareth^{[A]}	Beit She'an Municipal Stadium	3,000

The club played their home games at a neutral venue because their own ground did not meet Premier League requirements.

Beitar Jerusalem	Bnei Yehuda Hapoel Tel Aviv Maccabi Tel Aviv	Hapoel Be'er Sheva
Teddy Stadium	Bloomfield Stadium	Vasermil Stadium
Maccabi Haifa Bnei Sakhnin	Maccabi Petah Tikva Hapoel Petah Tikva	F.C. Ashdod
Kiryat Eliezer Stadium	Petah Tikva Municipal Stadium	Yud-Alef Stadium
Maccabi Netanya	Maccabi Ahi Nazareth	
Sar-Tov Stadium	Beit She'an Municipal Stadium	

== Final table ==
Pos	Team	Pld	W	D	L	GF	GA	GD	Pts	Qualification or relegation
1	Maccabi Haifa (C)	33	19	6	8	54	25	+29	63	Qualification for the Champions League third qualifying round
2	Maccabi Tel Aviv	33	16	9	8	35	22	+13	57	Qualification for the Champions League second qualifying round
3	Maccabi Petah Tikva	33	16	8	9	49	35	+14	56	Qualification for the UEFA Cup second qualifying round
4	Hapoel Be'er Sheva	33	16	7	10	48	36	+12	55	Qualification for the Intertoto Cup first round
5	Hapoel Tel Aviv	33	13	10	10	48	37	+11	49	
6	Bnei Yehuda	33	12	9	12	34	42	−8	45	
7	F.C. Ashdod	33	11	9	13	47	49	−2	42	
8	Hapoel Petah Tikva	33	11	9	13	46	52	−6	42	
9	Beitar Jerusalem	33	10	9	14	32	42	−10	39	
10	Bnei Sakhnin	33	8	11	14	31	38	−7	35	Qualification for the UEFA Cup second qualifying round
11	Maccabi Netanya (R)	33	8	7	18	28	52	−24	31	Relegated to Liga Leumit
12	Maccabi Ahi Nazareth (Note: Deducted 3 points) (R)	33	8	6	19	40	62	−22	27	Relegated to Liga Leumit

Source: futbol24.com
(C) Champions; (R) Relegated

== Results ==
=== First and second round ===
Home \ Away	BEI	BnS	BnY	ASH	HBS	HPT	HTA	MAN	MHA	MNE	MPT	MTA
Beitar Jerusalem	—	1–1	0–0	1–0	0–1	2–0	1–1	4–1	1–0	0–0	3–2	1–0
Bnei Sakhnin	0–2	—	2–3	1–0	1–2	1–1	1–1	1–0	0–1	2–1	0–0	1–1
Bnei Yehuda	1–1	0–1	—	2–1	0–1	3–3	1–1	2–0	1–2	2–0	1–0	0–0
F.C. Ashdod	2–1	1–0	1–2	—	1–2	2–0	3–3	3–5	1–1	4–0	3–2	0–2
Hapoel Be'er Sheva	2–0	2–1	0–0	4–0	—	0–1	0–0	1–2	2–2	2–0	2–1	0–0
Hapoel Petah Tikva	3–3	0–0	1–0	3–1	2–1	—	1–1	3–1	3–1	4–0	1–1	1–0
Hapoel Tel Aviv	4–1	0–1	3–0	3–0	3–0	3–0	—	1–0	0–0	2–0	1–0	0–2
Maccabi Ahi Nazareth	2–1	0–4	1–2	2–2	2–2	3–3	0–2	—	0–2	2–0	0–1	0–1
Maccabi Haifa	4–0	1–0	3–0	0–0	3–2	0–2	1–0	4–1	—	4–0	0–0	0–1
Maccabi Netanya	1–0	0–1	3–3	0–0	1–0	2–1	2–2	1–2	4–3	—	3–0	0–1
Maccabi Petah Tikva	1–0	2–1	0–0	4–1	1–2	4–1	2–1	2–0	0–2	0–0	—	2–2
Maccabi Tel Aviv	2–1	2–2	0–2	0–1	1–3	3–0	3–0	2–0	0–3	1–0	0–2	—

Legend: Blue = home team win; Yellow = draw; Red = away team win.

=== Third round ===
Home \ Away	BEI	BnS	BnY	ASH	HBS	HPT	HTA	MAN	MHA	MNE	MPT	MTA
Beitar Jerusalem	—	—	—	0–3	—	1–0	3–2	—	0–1	—	2–4	—
Bnei Sakhnin	0–0	—	1–1	—	0–1	—	—	—	—	0–1	—	0–0
Bnei Yehuda	2–0	—	—	—	1–6	—	—	0–2	—	1–0	0–1	1–0
F.C. Ashdod	—	4–1	3–0	—	1–1	—	—	—	—	2–1	—	1–1
Hapoel Be'er Sheva	0–1	—	—	—	—	0–0	3–2	2–1	—	2–1	1–3	—
Hapoel Petah Tikva	—	1–3	1–2	0–3	—	—	2–2	4–1	0–2	—	—	—
Hapoel Tel Aviv	—	2–2	2–1	1–0	—	—	—	3–2	1–0	—	—	0–1
Maccabi Ahi Nazareth	0–0	1–0	—	3–0	—	—	—	—	—	2–2	2–3	—
Maccabi Haifa	—	4–1	2–0	1–1	3–1	—	—	3–1	—	—	—	0–1
Maccabi Netanya	1–1	—	—	—	—	1–3	2–0	—	1–0	—	0–3	—
Maccabi Petah Tikva	—	2–1	—	2–2	—	2–1	2–1	—	0–1	—	—	—
Maccabi Tel Aviv	1–0	—	—	—	1–0	3–0	—	1–1	—	2–0	0–0	—

Legend: Blue = home team win; Yellow = draw; Red = away team win.

== Top goal scorers ==
Rank	Player	Club	Goals
1	(Israel) Shay Holtzman	F.C. Ashdod	16
1	(Israel) Ofir Haim	Hapoel Be'er Sheva	16
3	(Israel) Assi Tubi	Maccabi Ahi Nazareth	13
3	(Israel) Manor Hassan	Hapoel Petah Tikva	13
3	(Israel) Omer Golan	Maccabi Petah Tikva	13
6	(Croatia) Tomislav Erceg	Hapoel Petah Tikva	12
7	(Croatia) Mate Baturina	Bnei Yehuda	11
7	(Nigeria) Ibezito Ogbonna	Hapoel Tel Aviv	11
9	(Israel) Lior Asulin	Bnei Sakhnin	10
9	(Brazil) Gustavo Boccoli	Maccabi Ahi Nazareth	10

== See also ==
- 2003–04 Toto Cup Al
