= 2001–02 Israeli Premier League =

Israeli Premier League
- Season: 2001–02
- Champions: Maccabi Haifa; 7th title
- Relegated: Hapoel Haifa; Maccabi Kiryat Gat
- Top goalscorer: Kobi Refua (18)

The 2001–02 Israeli Premier League season saw Maccabi Haifa win their second consecutive title. It took place from the first match on 25 August 2001 to the final match on 18 May 2002.

Two teams from Liga Leumit were promoted at the end of the previous season: Hapoel Be'er Sheva and Maccabi Kiryat Gat. The two teams relegated were Bnei Yehuda and Tzafririm Holon.

== Teams and Locations ==
Locations of the 2002–03 Israeli Premier League teams

Twelve teams took part in the 2001-02 Israeli Premier League season, including ten teams from the 2000-01 season, as well as two teams which were promoted from the 2000-01 Liga Leumit.

Hapoel Be'er Sheva were promoted as champions of the 2000-01 Liga Leumit. Maccabi Kiryat Gat were promoted as runners up. Hapoel Be'er Sheva returned to the top flight after an absence of four seasons while Maccabi Kiryat Gat made their debut in the top flight.

Bnei Yehuda and Tzafririm Holon were relegated after finishing in the bottom two places in the 2000-01 season.

Club	Stadium	Capacity
Beitar Jerusalem	Teddy Stadium	21,600
Hapoel Tel Aviv	Bloomfield Stadium	15,700
Maccabi Tel Aviv	Bloomfield Stadium	15,700
Hapoel Haifa	Kiryat Eliezer Stadium	14,002
Maccabi Haifa	Kiryat Eliezer Stadium	14,002
Hapoel Be'er Sheva	Vasermil Stadium	13,000
F.C. Ashdod	Yud-Alef Stadium	7,800
Maccabi Kiryat Gat^{[A]}	Yud-Alef Stadium	7,800
Maccabi Netanya	Sar-Tov Stadium	7,500
Maccabi Petah Tikva	Petah Tikva Municipal Stadium	6,800
Hapoel Petah Tikva	Petah Tikva Municipal Stadium	6,800
Ironi Rishon LeZion	Haberfeld Stadium	6,000

The club played their home games at a neutral venue because their own ground did not meet Premier League requirements.

Beitar Jerusalem	Hapoel Tel Aviv Maccabi Tel Aviv	Hapoel Be'er Sheva
Teddy Stadium	Bloomfield Stadium	Vasermil Stadium
Maccabi Haifa Hapoel Haifa	Maccabi Petah Tikva Hapoel Petah Tikva	F.C. Ashdod Maccabi Kiryat Gat
Kiryat Eliezer Stadium	Petah Tikva Municipal Stadium	Yud-Alef Stadium
Maccabi Netanya	Ironi Rishon LeZion	
Sar-Tov Stadium	Haberfeld Stadium	

== Final table ==
Pos	Team	Pld	W	D	L	GF	GA	GD	Pts	Qualification or relegation
1	Maccabi Haifa (C)	33	22	9	2	72	32	+40	75	Qualification for the Champions League second qualifying round
2	Hapoel Tel Aviv	33	20	7	6	55	32	+23	67	Qualification for the UEFA Cup qualifying round
3	Maccabi Tel Aviv	33	15	12	6	43	24	+19	57	Qualification for the UEFA Cup qualifying round (Note: Maccabi Tel Aviv won the Israeli State Cup.)
4	F.C. Ashdod	33	14	7	12	47	52	−5	49	Qualification for the Intertoto Cup first round
5	Hapoel Be'er Sheva	33	14	6	13	44	48	−4	48	
6	Hapoel Petah Tikva	33	13	8	12	39	35	+4	47	
7	Maccabi Netanya	33	11	7	15	41	44	−3	40	
8	Maccabi Petah Tikva	33	8	12	13	36	47	−11	36	
9	Ironi Rishon LeZion	33	10	5	18	39	53	−14	35	
10	Beitar Jerusalem	33	7	12	14	39	49	−10	33	
11	Hapoel Haifa (R)	33	7	9	17	35	50	−15	30	Relegation to Liga Leumit
12	Maccabi Kiryat Gat (R)	33	7	6	20	34	58	−24	27	Relegation to Liga Leumit

Source: futbol24.com
(C) Champions; (R) Relegated

== Results ==
=== First and second round ===
Home \ Away	BEI	ASH	HBS	HHA	HPT	HTA	IRZ	MHA	MKG	MNE	MPT	MTA
Beitar Jerusalem	—	0–1	0–0	2–3	0–0	2–3	1–0	2–3	1–2	3–1	0–0	1–0
F.C. Ashdod	1–1	—	0–1	2–0	2–1	0–2	2–1	1–1	2–1	2–1	1–1	0–2
Hapoel Be'er Sheva	3–3	3–1	—	3–1	0–1	1–2	0–1	1–2	1–0	1–0	2–1	1–4
Hapoel Haifa	4–1	6–1	1–3	—	2–0	1–1	0–2	1–2	2–1	0–2	1–1	0–0
Hapoel Petah Tikva	2–2	1–1	0–2	3–2	—	1–0	1–1	1–1	2–0	6–1	0–1	3–0
Hapoel Tel Aviv	1–0	3–1	2–0	1–0	2–1	—	3–1	1–1	4–0	2–0	2–0	2–2
Ironi Rishon LeZion	1–0	1–2	4–1	1–0	0–1	0–3	—	1–3	2–1	1–0	2–3	2–1
Maccabi Haifa	2–1	0–0	4–2	2–1	2–1	2–1	4–1	—	2–0	2–1	1–0	2–1
Maccabi Kiryat Gat	1–2	2–4	1–1	0–0	1–3	0–1	2–1	1–5	—	0–2	2–0	1–2
Maccabi Netanya	4–0	1–2	1–0	0–0	0–0	3–0	4–2	0–0	0–0	—	1–1	0–4
Maccabi Petah Tikva	1–1	2–2	1–3	2–3	1–1	0–0	3–1	2–1	2–0	0–2	—	0–4
Maccabi Tel Aviv	1–1	1–0	1–0	1–1	2–1	0–1	1–0	1–1	0–0	0–1	1–0	—

Legend: Blue = home team win; Yellow = draw; Red = away team win.

=== Third round ===
Home \ Away	BEI	ASH	HBS	HHA	HPT	HTA	IRZ	MHA	MKG	MNE	MPT	MTA
Beitar Jerusalem	—	—	—	3–0	0–1	—	—	1–1	—	2–1	—	0–0
F.C. Ashdod	1–0	—	—	4–0	0–1	4–2	—	—	2–1	0–3	—	—
Hapoel Be'er Sheva	3–3	1–3	—	1–0	—	2–2	—	—	3–1	1–0	—	—
Hapoel Haifa	—	—	—	—	0–1	—	—	0–2	—	1–0	2–2	1–1
Hapoel Petah Tikva	—	—	0–1	—	—	—	2–0	0–5	3–1	—	0–1	0–0
Hapoel Tel Aviv	2–0	—	—	2–1	2–1	—	—	—	3–0	1–1	—	1–1
Ironi Rishon LeZion	1–0	2–2	1–2	1–1	—	2–0	—	—	—	—	—	—
Maccabi Haifa	—	5–1	3–1	—	—	3–0	3–1	—	0–4	—	1–1	—
Maccabi Kiryat Gat	3–3	—	—	2–0	—	—	2–1	—	—	2–1	1–2	—
Maccabi Netanya	—	—	—	—	3–1	—	2–2	2–6	—	—	2–0	1–2
Maccabi Petah Tikva	2–3	3–1	0–0	—	—	1–3	1–1	—	—	—	—	—
Maccabi Tel Aviv	—	2–1	4–0	—	—	—	2–1	0–0	1–1	—	1–0	—

Legend: Blue = home team win; Yellow = draw; Red = away team win.

== Top goal scorers ==
Rank	Player	Club	Goals
1	(Israel) Kobi Refua	Maccabi Petah Tikva	18
2	(Israel) Shay Holtzman	Ironi Rishon LeZion	17
3	(Moldova) Serghei Cleşcenco	Hapoel Tel-Aviv	14
4	(Nigeria) Yakubu	Maccabi Haifa	13
4	(Chile) Rodrigo Goldberg	Maccabi Tel Aviv	13
4	(Israel) Avi Nimni	Maccabi Tel-Aviv	13
7	(Israel) Assi Tubi	F.C. Ashdod	12
8	(Israel) Manor Hassan	Beitar Jerusalem	11
8	(Israel) Itzik Zohar	Beitar Jerusalem	11
10	(Israel) Motti Kakoun	Hapoel Petah Tikva	10

== See also ==
- 2001–02 Toto Cup Al
