= Ofir Haim =

Israeli former association footballer and current manager

Personal information
- Full name: Ofir Haim
- Date of birth: 21 April 1975 (age 51)
- Place of birth: Ramat Gan, Israel
- Height: 1.75 m (5 ft 9 in)
- Position: Striker

Team information
- Current team: Israel U-19 (head coach) Israel U-20 (head coach)

Youth career
- Maccabi Tel Aviv

Senior career*
Years	Team	Apps	(Gls)
1993–1996	Ironi Rishon LeZion	67	(27)
1996	Maccabi Herzliya	11	(2)
1997	Ironi Rishon LeZion	19	(4)
1997–1998	Maccabi Jaffa	29	(26)
1998–2000	Maccabi Tel Aviv	46	(11)
2001–2004	Hapoel Be'er Sheva	89	(34)
2004	İstanbulspor	6	(1)
2005–2006	Maccabi Tel Aviv	33	(7)
2006–2007	Maccabi Netanya	26	(5)
2007–2009	Hapoel Be'er Sheva	36	(10)
2009–2010	Maccabi Herzliya	30	(4)
2010–2011	Hapoel Ramat Gan	14	(3)
2011–2012	Hapoel Marmorek	18	(4)
Total		424	(138)

Managerial career
- 2012: Hapoel Marmorek
- 2013–2014: Maccabi Kabilio Jaffa
- 2014–2015: Hapoel Tel Aviv (youth)
- 2015: Hapoel Rishon LeZion
- 2016: Hapoel Tel Aviv (assistant)
- 2016–2017: Maccabi Sha'arayim
- 2017–2018: Hapoel Afula
- 2018–2019: Hapoel Tel Aviv
- 2019–2020: Hapoel Kfar Saba
- 2021–: Israel U-19
- 2023–: Israel U-20
Medal record
Representing Israel U-19
UEFA European Under-19 Championship
Runner-up	2022 Slovakia	Team
Representing Israel U-20
FIFA U-20 World Cup
	2022 Argentina	Team
- * Club domestic league appearances and goals ‡ National team caps and goals as of 4 June 2023

Ofir Haim (Hebrew: אופיר חיים; born 21 April 1975) is an Israeli former footballer and manager who head coaches both the Israel national under-19 team and the Israel national under-20 team.

== Early life ==
Haim was born and raised in Rishon LeZion, Israel, to an Israeli family of Jewish descent. He has three children with his wife Orly, one of whom is on the autism spectrum. His brother Avi Haim is one of the deputy mayors of the city of Rishon LeZion, Israel.

== Managerial career ==
=== International career ===
==== Israel U-19 ====
He has been the head coach of the Israel U-19 since the beginning of the first qualifiers round, through its Elite Round, and all the way to the final match in the final tournament of the 2022 UEFA Euro Under-19 against England U-19, where his native Israel finished 2nd.

==== Israel U-20 ====
Haim is currently the head coach of the Israel national under-20 team, during their 2023 FIFA U-20 World Cup campaign in Argentina.

== Honours ==
=== As Player ===
Team

- Israeli Second Division
  - Winner (2): 1997–98, 2000–01
- Toto Cup
  - Winner (1): 1998–99
- Israel State Cup
  - Runner-up (2): 1996, 2003
- Israeli Premier League
  - Runner-up (1): 2006–07
- Toto Cup (Leumit)
  - Winner (1): 2008-09

Individual

- 1997–98 Liga Artzit Top Goalscorer - 26 goals
- 2003–04 Israeli Premier League Top Goalscorer - 16 goals (joint with Shay Holtzman)

=== As Manager ===
- UEFA European Under-19 Championship
  - Runner-up (1): 2022

== See also ==
- List of Jewish footballers
- List of Jews in sports
- List of Jews in sports (non-players)
- List of Israelis
