= 2002–03 Liga Leumit =

Israeli football season

The 2002–03 Liga Leumit season saw Maccabi Ahi Nazareth and Bnei Sakhnin promoted to the Israeli Premier League, the first time that two Arab clubs would appear in the top division (at the end of the season, the first Arab club to play in the top division, Hapoel Tayibe, folded).

Maccabi Kafr Kanna and Beitar Avraham Be'er Sheva were relegated to Liga Artzit.

Hapoel Ramat Gan qualified for the UEFA Cup after becoming the first club from outside the top division to win the State Cup. They remain the only club not in the top flight to play in Europe.

== Final table ==
Pos	Team	Pld	W	D	L	GF	GA	GD	Pts	Promotion or relegation
1	Maccabi Ahi Nazareth	33	18	8	7	48	29	+19	59 (Note: Three points deducted due to duplicating contracts with a player.)	Promoted to Premier League
2	Bnei Sakhnin	33	17	7	9	36	25	+11	58	Promoted to Premier League
3	Hapoel Jerusalem	33	15	12	6	64	41	+23	57	
4	Hapoel Nazareth Illit	33	15	10	8	43	24	+19	55	
5	Maccabi Herzliya	33	15	10	8	46	36	+10	55	
6	Hapoel Haifa	33	11	7	15	37	37	0	40	
7	Hapoel Ramat Gan	33	10	9	14	44	53	−9	39	Qualified for UEFA Cup
8	Hapoel Ra'anana	33	10	8	15	36	43	−7	38	
9	Tzafririm Holon	33	8	13	12	29	37	−8	37	
10	Maccabi Kiryat Gat	33	8	13	12	36	47	−11	35 (Note: Two points deducted.)	
11	Maccabi Kafr Kanna	33	9	6	18	29	49	−20	32 (Note: One point deducted due to duplicating contracts with a player.)	Relegated to Liga Artzit
12	Beitar Avraham Be'er Sheva	33	4	13	16	26	53	−27	25	Relegated to Liga Artzit

Source: rsssf.com
