= Benjamin Davidovich =

Israeli goalkeeper (1930–2024)

Benjamin Davidovich בנימין דוידוביץ
Personal information
- Full name: Benjamin Davidovich
- Date of birth: February 18, 1930
- Place of birth: Germany
- Date of death: June 25, 2024 (aged 94)
- Place of death: Shiv Tova, Israel
- Position: Goalkeeper

Senior career*
Years	Team	Apps	(Gls)
	Maccabi Haifa	23	(0)
- * Club domestic league appearances and goals as of March 7, 2007

Benjamin Davidovich (Hebrew: בנימין דוידוביץ; February 18, 1930 – June 25, 2024) was an Israeli goalkeeper who played for Maccabi Haifa. A Holocaust survivor, Davidovich arrived to Mandatory Palestine and settled in Rishon leZion in 1945. His son, Nir, is often seen as a spit and image of his father and later progressed to become one of Maccabi Haifa's most iconic figures.

Davidovich died in Shiv Tova on June 25, 2024, at the age of 94.
