= 2000–01 Liga Leumit =

Israeli football season

The 2000–01 Liga Leumit season saw Hapoel Be'er Sheva and Maccabi Kiryat Gat promoted to the Israeli Premier League, the latter for the first time in their history. Maccabi Ironi Kiryat Ata and Hapoel Jerusalem were relegated to Liga Artzit. Abed Titi of Maccabi Ahi Nazareth was the league's top scorer with 22 goals.

Following the first three rounds (33 games), the table was split into two, with teams from the "Upper group" and "Lower group" playing each other once more to make a total of 38 matches. The split meant that clubs in the bottom six could not finish above those in the top six, even though the four clubs finishing 7th-10th finished with more points that the 5th- and 6th-placed clubs.

== Final table ==
Pos	Team	Pld	W	D	L	GF	GA	GD	Pts	Promotion or relegation
1	Hapoel Be'er Sheva	38	16	14	8	51	33	+18	62	Promoted to Premier League
2	Maccabi Kiryat Gat	38	16	13	9	55	42	+13	61	Promoted to Premier League
3	Beitar Avraham Be'er Sheva	38	15	15	8	61	46	+15	60	
4	Hapoel Ramat Gan	38	13	13	12	45	49	−4	52	
5	Hakoah Ramat Gan	38	13	10	15	53	58	−5	49	
6	Hapoel Beit She'an	38	12	12	14	35	44	−9	48	
7	Bnei Sakhnin	38	14	11	13	45	43	+2	51 (Note: 2 points deducted for violating of budget rules.)	
8	Hapoel Kfar Saba	38	13	12	13	48	40	+8	50 (Note: 1 point deducted for duplicating player contracts.)	
9	Maccabi Herzliya	38	13	11	14	51	44	+7	50	
10	Maccabi Ahi Nazareth	38	14	8	16	43	45	−2	50	
11	Maccabi Ironi Kiryat Ata (Note: Before the start of the season, Maccabi Acre moved to Kiryat Ata and were renamed Maccabi Ironi Kiryat Ata.)	38	9	14	15	55	68	−13	41	Relegated to Liga Artzit
12	Hapoel Jerusalem	38	8	11	19	37	67	−30	35	Relegated to Liga Artzit

Source: rsssf.com
