= Samuel Yeboah =

Ghanaian footballer

Personal information
- Date of birth: 8 August 1986 (age 40)
- Place of birth: Accra, Ghana
- Height: 1.80 m (5 ft 11 in)
- Position: Striker

Senior career*
Years	Team	Apps	(Gls)
2003–2004	Heart of Lions	25	(18)
2004–2005	Sheriff Tiraspol	25	(11)
2005–2008	Hapoel Kfar Saba	82	(33)
2008–2010	Hapoel Tel Aviv	41	(15)
2010–2011	Genk	16	(3)
2010–2011	→ Beitar Jerusalem (loan)	30	(4)
2011–2012	F.C. Ashdod	8	(0)
2012	Nea Salamis Famagusta	11	(3)
2013–2015	Heart of Lions		(6)
2016–2017	Hearts of Oak	34	(4)

International career^{‡}
2008–2009	Ghana	3	(0)
- * Club domestic league appearances and goals ‡ National team caps and goals as of 9 November 2013

Samuel Yeboah (born 8 August 1986) is a Ghanaian footballer.

== Career ==
=== Hapoel Kfar-Saba ===
Samuel Yeboah played in Hapoel Kfar-Saba and won the Israeli golden shoe award.

=== Hapoel Tel Aviv ===
In the 2008–9 season, Yeboah was very successful scoring 13 goals and also making 3 assists in 30 league games.

In April 2009, it was reported that CSKA Moscow had offered €2.5m to Hapoel Tel Aviv for the young Ghanaian striker. He was also linked with a move to English Premiership newcomers Birmingham City.

=== KRC Genk ===
On 28 December 2009, KRC Genk paid a reported transfer fee of €700,000 for Samuel Yeboah. On 4 January 2010, he signed a contract for 3.5 seasons until 30 June 2013, with an option for one more. He then went on loan to Israeli side Beitar Jerusalem for a season.

== International career ==
The then 22-year-old made his debut for the national team on 22 November 2008 when the Black Stars were held to a goalless draw by Tunisia. He played his second game for the national side on 11 February 2009 against Egypt, coming up as substitute on the 70th minute. The match ended 2-2.

== Honours ==
=== Team ===
- Divizia Naţională (1):
  - 2005

=== Individual ===
- Ghana Premier League: Top Goalscorer (18 goals)
  - 2003-04
- Israeli Premier League: Top Goalscorer (15 Goals)
  - 2007-08
