= Kobi Refua =

Israeli footballer and manager

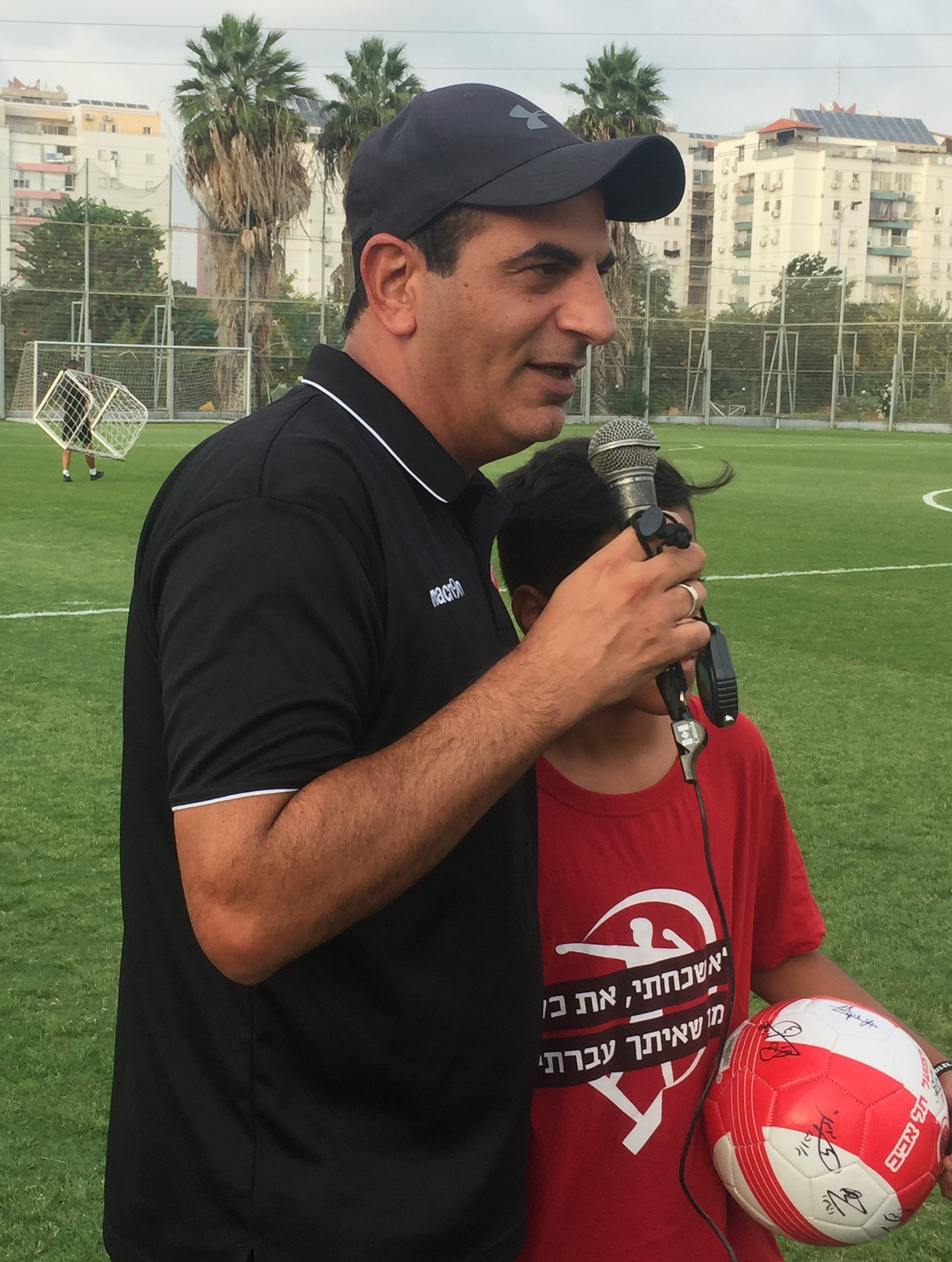
- Refua in 2018

Personal information
- Date of birth: 3 September 1974 (age 52)
- Place of birth: Kfar Yona, Israel
- Height: 5 ft 9 in (1.75 m)
- Position: Striker

Team information
- Current team: Hapoel Tel Aviv

Youth career
- Maccabi Tel Aviv

Senior career*
Years	Team	Apps	(Gls)
1993–1994	Maccabi Tel Aviv	0	(0)
1994–1995	Hapoel Ashdod		
1995–1996	Hapoel Kfar Saba	69	(16)
1996–2000	Bnei Yehuda	109	(46)
2000–2001	Maccabi Tel Aviv	22	(6)
2001	Bnei Yehuda	12	(3)
2001–2005	Maccabi Petah Tikva	88	(37)

Managerial career
- 2012–2014: Maccabi Petah Tikva (youth)
- 2013–2014: Maccabi Petah Tikva (joint-manager)
- 2015–2016: Ironi Kiryat Shmona (assistant manager)
- 2016: Maccabi Sha'arayim
- 2016–2017: Maccabi Petah Tikva
- 2017–2018: Hapoel Tel Aviv
- 2019: Hapoel Tel Aviv
- 2019–2021: Ironi Kiryat Shmona
- 2021–2022: Hapoel Tel Aviv
- 2022–2023: Bnei Sakhnin
- 2025: Bnei Yehuda
- * Club domestic league appearances and goals

Kobi Refua (Hebrew: קובי רפואה; born 3 September 1974) is an Israeli football manager and former player.

== Early life ==
Refua was born and raised in Kfar Yona, Israel, to an Israeli family of Jewish descent.

== Honours ==
=== As a player ===
Maccabi Petah Tikva

- Toto Cup: 2003–04

Individual

- Israeli Premier League top goalscorer: 2001–02 (18 goals)

=== As a manager ===
Maccabi Sha'arayim

- Third tier: 2015–16

== See also ==
- List of Jewish footballers
- List of Jews in sports
- List of Jews in sports (non-players)
- List of Israelis
