= Yaniv Abargil =

Israeli footballer

Yaniv Abargil יניב אברג'יל
Personal information
- Full name: Yaniv Abargil
- Date of birth: 16 August 1977 (age 49)
- Place of birth: Israel
- Height: 5 ft 9 in (1.75 m)
- Position: Striker

Youth career
- Beitar Tel Aviv

Senior career*
Years	Team	Apps	(Gls)
1994–1996	Beitar Tel Aviv	47	(13)
1996–2000	Hapoel Kfar Saba	118	(38)
2000–2001	Beitar Jerusalem	32	(4)
2001	Maccabi Petah Tikva	8	(1)
2002	Hapoel Be'er Sheva	17	(6)
2002–2004	Hapoel Kfar Saba	60	(28)
2004–2005	Hapoel Be'er Sheva	32	(8)
2005–2006	Bnei Sakhnin	30	(2)
2006–2007	Maccabi Ahi Nazareth	27	(3)
2007–2008	Ironi Tiberias	12	(9)
2008	Hapoel Umm al-Fahm	10	(5)
2008–2009	Ahva Arraba	24	(13)
2009	Ironi Umm al-Fahm	7	(3)
2009	Maccabi Kafr Kanna	4	(0)
2010	Maccabi Umm al-Fahm	15	(10)
2010	Ironi Tiberias	8	(1)
2010	F.C. Bu'eine	1	(2)
2010–2011	Maccabi Umm al-Fahm	18	(3)
2011–2013	Hapoel Bu'eine	51	(50)
2013	Ahi Bir al-Maksur	4	(1)

International career
2003	Israel	1	(0)
- * Club domestic league appearances and goals

Yaniv Abargil (Hebrew: יניב אברג'יל; born 16 August 1977) is an Israeli footballer.

== Honours ==
=== Team ===
Peace Cup 2000–01, won on 10 September 2000 with Beitar Jerusalem in Rome. Abargil scored 4 goals out of the 8 that Beitar Jerusalem scored, 3 goals in the 1st Game (won 7–0 over AlWaqass of Jordan) and 1 goal in the 2nd game (won 1–0 over AS Roma). Each game lasted 45 minutes.

- Toto Cup
  - Runners-up (1): 2000–01 Toto Cup Al (with Beitar Jerusalem)
- Liga Alef (North) (3):
  - 2007–08, 2008–09, 2010–11

=== Individual ===
- Israeli Premier League: Top Goalscorer (18 Goals)
  - 2002–03
