= Assi Tubi =

Former Israeli Footballer Israeli Rabbi

Rabbi Assi Tubi רב אסי טובי
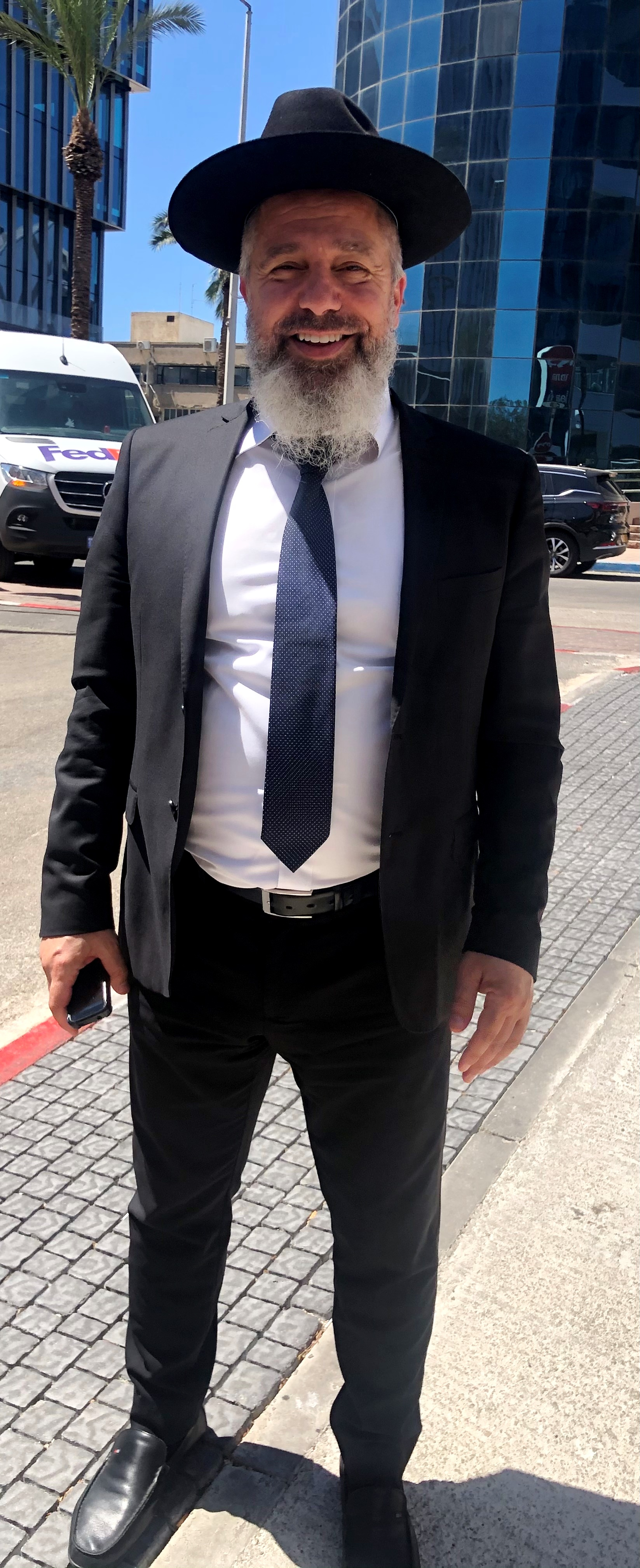
- Assi Tubi

Personal information
- Date of birth: January 27, 1972 (age 54)
- Place of birth: Tel Aviv, Israel
- Position: Striker

Youth career
- Shimshon Tel Aviv

Senior career*
Years	Team	Apps	(Gls)
1990–1994	Shimshon Tel Aviv	116	(26)
1994–1995	Tzafririm Holon	37	(12)
1995	Ironi Ashdod	12	(5)
1996	Hapoel Kfar Saba	14	(2)
1997–1998	Hapoel Jerusalem	46	(19)
1998–1999	Hapoel Tel Aviv	27	(10)
1999–2001	Maccabi Petah Tikva	75	(35)
2001–2002	F.C. Ashdod	31	(12)
2002–2003	Hapoel Nazareth Illit	26	(11)
2003–2004	Maccabi Ahi Nazareth	29	(13)
2004	Hapoel Petah Tikva	10	(0)
2005	Maccabi Ahi Nazareth	15	(5)
2005–2006	Hapoel Jerusalem	33	(16)
2006–2007	Ironi Nir Ramat HaSharon	1	(0)
2007–2008	Maccabi Ironi Amishav Petah Tikva	5	(0)
2008–2010	Maccabi HaShikma Ramat Hen	22	(9)

International career
1998	Israel	1	(1)
- * Club domestic league appearances and goals

Assi Tubi (Hebrew: אסי טובי; born 27 January 1972) is a former Israeli footballer. He was the Israeli Premier League top scorer in the 1999–2000 season with 27 goals. Today Rabbi Assi Tubi is the head of the Hazon Ovadia Kollel in Raanana.

== Honours ==
- State Cup
  - 1999
- Toto Cup
  - 2000-01
