= 2000–01 Israeli Premier League =

Israeli Premier League
- Season: 2000–01
- Champions: Maccabi Haifa; 6th title
- Relegated: Bnei Yehuda; Hapoel Tzafririm Holon
- Top goalscorer: Avi Nimni (25)

The 2000–01 Israeli Premier League season had Maccabi Haifa win the title, while Bnei Yehuda and Tzafririm Holon were relegated.

The regular season took place from the first match on 12 August 2000 to the final match on 22 April 2001. The table was then divided into two groups, the upper and lower, which had six teams each. Then each team played the other five in their group once. The second stage was held between 27 April 2001 and 26 May 2001.

One team from Liga Leumit was promoted at the end of the previous season: Hapoel Tzafririm Holon. The three teams relegated were: Hapoel Kfar Saba, Maccabi Herzliya and Hapoel Jerusalem.

== Final table ==
First 6 teams played in the top playoffs while the last 6 teams played in the bottom playoffs.

Pos	Team	Pld	W	D	L	GF	GA	GD	Pts	Qualification or relegation (Note: Teams played each other three times (33 matches), before the league split into two groups (the top six and the bottom six) for the last five matches.)
1	Maccabi Haifa (C)	38	24	10	4	68	28	+40	82	Qualification for the Champions League second qualifying round
2	Hapoel Tel Aviv	38	21	12	5	55	29	+26	75	Qualification for the UEFA Cup qualifying round
3	Hapoel Haifa	38	20	11	7	59	38	+21	71	Qualification for the Intertoto Cup first round
4	Maccabi Tel Aviv	38	19	11	8	73	33	+40	68	Qualification for the UEFA Cup qualifying round (Note: Maccabi Tel Aviv won the Israeli State Cup.)
5	Beitar Jerusalem (Note: Deducted 1 point.)	38	18	9	11	49	42	+7	62	
6	Hapoel Petah Tikva	38	12	10	16	58	66	−8	46	
7	Maccabi Netanya	38	13	10	15	63	61	+2	49	
8	Maccabi Petah Tikva	38	13	8	17	43	52	−9	47	
9	Ironi Rishon LeZion	38	11	8	19	41	61	−20	41	
10	F.C. Ashdod	38	10	8	20	44	57	−13	38	
11	Bnei Yehuda (R)	38	8	9	21	38	64	−26	33	Relegation to Liga Leumit
12	Tzafririm Holon (R)	38	4	4	30	25	85	−60	16	Relegation to Liga Leumit

Source: RSSSF
(C) Champions; (R) Relegated

== Results ==
=== First and second round ===
Home \ Away	BEI	BnY	ASH	HHA	HPT	HTA	IRZ	MHA	MNE	MPT	MTA	TZH
Beitar Jerusalem	—	0–0	2–1	3–1	3–1	1–0	2–0	0–0	2–0	1–0	1–0	2–1
Bnei Yehuda	2–2	—	3–2	3–2	1–1	0–0	0–2	1–2	1–4	2–1	0–1	0–2
F.C. Ashdod	0–1	2–0	—	1–2	0–2	0–4	0–1	0–2	0–3	2–0	1–2	6–1
Hapoel Haifa	1–1	2–0	0–0	—	1–0	2–2	2–0	0–2	1–0	3–3	2–2	2–0
Hapoel Petah Tikva	2–2	5–1	3–3	2–0	—	1–1	1–1	1–3	1–2	2–1	3–1	3–0
Hapoel Tel Aviv	0–1	2–1	2–0	1–3	2–2	—	3–0	1–1	1–0	3–2	2–1	3–0
Ironi Rishon LeZion	0–1	0–1	2–1	1–3	2–0	1–3	—	0–1	2–1	2–2	1–1	3–0
Maccabi Haifa	0–0	3–2	4–1	0–3	3–2	0–0	3–0	—	1–0	4–1	0–0	3–2
Maccabi Netanya	0–2	2–1	2–2	0–3	3–2	0–2	3–1	1–2	—	2–0	0–0	1–0
Maccabi Petah Tikva	2–2	1–1	2–1	4–1	0–3	0–1	3–0	1–0	2–2	—	2–1	1–0
Maccabi Tel Aviv	2–0	1–0	1–1	0–0	1–0	0–1	10–1	0–3	0–0	0–1	—	6–2
Tzafririm Holon	0–1	0–0	0–2	0–2	0–3	0–0	2–2	0–2	0–3	1–2	0–6	—

Source: RSSSF
Legend: Blue = home team win; Yellow = draw; Red = away team win.

=== Third round ===
Home \ Away	BEI	BnY	ASH	HHA	HPT	HTA	IRZ	MHA	MNE	MPT	MTA	TZH
Beitar Jerusalem	—	—	0–0	2–3	0–1	1–2	—	—	4–0	—	0–1	—
Bnei Yehuda	2–4	—	2–0	1–1	1–2	—	1–2	—	—	—	—	—
F.C. Ashdod	—	—	—	0–2	4–0	0–0	—	0–0	0–1	—	1–5	—
Hapoel Haifa	—	—	—	—	—	—	—	1–1	0–0	4–0	0–0	2–0
Hapoel Petah Tikva	—	—	—	0–0	—	—	—	2–3	2–1	—	1–2	1–3
Hapoel Tel Aviv	—	1–0	—	0–1	2–0	—	—	—	—	3–2	—	2–0
Ironi Rishon LeZion	0–2	—	0–1	3–0	0–1	2–3	—	—	—	—	1–3	—
Maccabi Haifa	3–0	5–0	—	—	—	1–1	0–0	—	—	1–0	—	4–1
Maccabi Netanya	—	2–2	—	—	—	0–1	1–1	0–1	—	0–0	—	0–1
Maccabi Petah Tikva	1–2	1–1	0–3	—	5–1	—	1–0	—	—	—	—	—
Maccabi Tel Aviv	—	1–0	—	—	—	2–2	—	1–2	2–1	1–0	—	3–2
Tzafririm Holon	1–0	2–4	0–1	—	—	—	0–2	—	—	1–5	—	—

Source: RSSSF
Legend: Blue = home team win; Yellow = draw; Red = away team win.

=== Fourth round ===
==== Upper Group ====
Home \ Away	BEI	HHA	HPT	HTA	MHA	MTA
Beitar Jerusalem	—	—	—	—	0–2	—
Hapoel Haifa	1–0	—	—	2–0	—	—
Hapoel Petah Tikva	4–4	—	—	1–1	—	—
Hapoel Tel Aviv	1–0	—	—	—	1–0	1–1
Maccabi Haifa	—	1–3	4–0	—	—	0–2 (Note: The game was abandoned after Maccabi Haifa's leading goal for 3–2 against Maccabi Tel Aviv in the 82nd minute, after the local fans stormed the pitch. 41 people were injured. The game was rated 0–2.)
Maccabi Tel Aviv	7–0	4–0	2–0	—	—	—

Source: RSSSF
Legend: Blue = home team win; Yellow = draw; Red = away team win.

==== Lower Group ====
Home \ Away	BnY	ASH	IRZ	MNE	MPT	TZH
Bnei Yehuda	—	—	—	0–1	1–2	1–0
F.C. Ashdod	3–1	—	0–0	3–5	—	1–0
Ironi Rishon LeZion	0–1	—	—	4–4	2–0	2–0
Maccabi Netanya	—	—	—	—	6–1	1–1
Maccabi Petah Tikva	—	2–1	—	—	—	—
Tzafririm Holon	—	—	—	—	2–3	—

Source: RSSSF
Legend: Blue = home team win; Yellow = draw; Red = away team win.

== Top scorers ==
Rank	Player	Club	Goals
1	(Israel) Avi Nimni	Maccabi Tel-Aviv	25
2	(Israel) Motti Kakoun	Hapoel Petah Tikva	19
3	(Romania) Viorel Tănase	Maccabi Netanya	14
3	(Israel) Liron Vilner	Maccabi Netanya	14
3	(Israel) Itzik Zohar	Maccabi Netanya	14
6	(Israel) Yossi Benayoun	Maccabi Haifa	13
6	(Israel) Rafi Cohen	Maccabi Haifa	13
6	(Israel) Amir Turgeman	Hapoel Haifa	13
9	(Israel) Alon Mizrahi	Beitar Jerusalem	12
9	(Georgia (country)) Klimenti Tsitaishvili	Ironi Rishon LeZion	12

== See also ==
- 2000–01 Toto Cup Al
