= Manor Hassan =

Israeli footballer

Manor Hassan מנור חסן
Personal information
- Full name: Manor Hassan
- Date of birth: August 22, 1976 (age 50)
- Place of birth: Kiryat Ono, Israel
- Position: Midfielder

Youth career
- Hapoel Kiryat Ono
- Hapoel Petah Tikva

Senior career*
Years	Team	Apps	(Gls)
1994–2000	Hapoel Petah Tikva	128	(24)
2000–2001	Maccabi Haifa	17	(3)
2001–2002	Beitar Jerusalem	27	(11)
2002	Bnei Yehuda Tel Aviv	14	(4)
2003–2006	Hapoel Petah Tikva	92	(33)
2006–2007	F.C. Ashdod	7	(0)
2007	Hakoah Amidar Ramat Gan	12	(1)
2008	Hapoel Petah Tikva	10	(1)
2008–2009	Hapoel Asi Gilboa	10	(1)
2009	Hapoel Kiryat Ono	12	(8)

International career^{‡}
1995–1997	Israel U-21	18	(5)
- * Club domestic league appearances and goals as of July 30, 2006 ‡ National team caps and goals as of July 30, 2006

Manor Hassan (Hebrew: מנור חסן; born August 22, 1979) is a retired Israeli football player.

He is of Tunisian-Jewish descent.
