= Israeli Premier League =

Top-division men's football league

- Organising body: Israel Football Association
- Founded: 1999; 27 years ago
- Country: Israel
- Confederation: UEFA (Europe; 1980–81; 1991–present); OFC (Oceania; 1985–89); AFC (Asia; 1954–74)
- Number of clubs: 14 (since 2012–13)
- Level on pyramid: 1
- Relegation to: Liga Leumit
- Domestic cup(s): Israel State Cup; Toto Cup (Al); Israel Super Cup
- International cup(s): UEFA Champions League; UEFA Europa League; UEFA Conference League
- Current champions: Hapoel Be'er Sheva (6th title) (2025–26)
- Most championships: Maccabi Tel Aviv (26 titles)
- Broadcasters: Charlton Sport, Sport 5
- Website: football.co.il
- Current: 2026–27 Israeli Premier League

The Israeli Premier League (Hebrew: ליגת העל, Ligat HaAl, lit. 'The Super League') is a professional association football league in Israel and the highest level of the Israeli football league system. The league is contested by 14 clubs, and operates on a system of promotion and relegation with its second division Liga Leumit. Seasons run from August to May, with teams playing between 33 and 36 matches each, totalling 240 matches in every season.

The competition formed in 1999 following the decision of the Israel Football Association to form a new league. It is also ranked 15th in the UEFA coefficients of leagues based on performances in European competitions over the last five years.

Since 1932, a total of 15 clubs have been crowned champions of the Israeli Football League. Of the thirty one clubs to have competed since the inception of the Israeli Premier League in 1999, six have won the title: Beitar Jerusalem (twice), Hapoel Be'er Sheva (three times), Hapoel Tel Aviv (twice), Maccabi Haifa (ten times), Maccabi Tel Aviv (eight times), and Ironi Kiryat Shmona (once). The current champions are Hapoel Be'er Sheva, who won the 2025–26 season.

== Background ==
The Israeli Premier League was founded in 1999 to replace its predecessor Liga Leumit (which became the second division) when the Israel Football Association decided to reshuffle all the leagues in hopes of improving competition. In its first season there were 14 clubs; the top thirteen clubs from the 1998–99 season and the top place club from the Liga Artzit (then, the third division). That season three clubs were relegated and one from Liga Leumit was promoted.

== Competition ==
There are 14 clubs in the league. At the end of each season, the two lowest-placed teams are relegated to Liga Leumit while two highest-placed teams of Liga Leumit are promoted in their place. For the 2012–13 season the league was decreased from 16 to 14 clubs as a result of reforms passed by the IFA on 27 June 2011.

The participating clubs first play a conventional round-robin schedule for a total of 26 matches.

Following this, the top six teams play in a championship playoff, where they meet each other twice. Upon its conclusion, the first place team wins the Israeli championship and qualifies to participate in the second qualifying round of the UEFA Champions League. The runners-up and the third-placed teams qualify for the second qualifying round of the UEFA Europa Conference League.

In addition, the Israeli State Cup winners qualify for the first qualifying round of the UEFA Europa League.

If the State Cup winners are also one of the teams to finish in the league's top three places then the fourth-placed team will also play in the UEFA Europa Conference League. In case the State Cup winners also win the Israeli Premier League then the second-placed league team will play in first qualifying round of the UEFA Europa League.

In addition, the bottom eight teams will play each other once to avoid two relegation spots.

== Clubs ==
A total of 31 clubs have played in the Israeli Premier League from its inception in 1999 and the start of the 2025–26 season. For a list of winners and runners-up of the Israeli Premier League since its inception, and top scorers for each season, see List of Israeli football champions.

Three clubs have been members of the Israeli Premier League for every season since its inception. This group is composed of Beitar Jerusalem, Maccabi Haifa and Maccabi Tel Aviv.

=== Members of the 2025–26 season ===
Locations of the 2025–26 Israeli Premier League teams

The following 14 clubs will compete in the Israeli Premier League during the 2024–25 season.

| Club | Position in 2024–25 | First season in the Israeli Premier League | Number of seasons in the Israeli Premier League | First season of current spell in Israeli Premier League | Top division titles | Last top division title |
|---|---|---|---|---|---|---|
| Beitar Jerusalem (Note: Never been relegated from the Israeli Premier League) (Note: One of the original Israeli Premier League teams) | 2nd | 1999–2000 | 28th | 1999–2000 | 6 | 2007–2008 |
| Bnei Sakhnin | 11th | 2009–2010 | 22st | 2020–2021 | 0 | Never |
| Hapoel Be'er Sheva | 1st | 2001–2002 | 22st | 2009–2010 | 6 | 2025–2026 |
| Hapoel Haifa | 10th | 1999–2000 | 22st | 2009–2010 | 1 | 1998–1999 |
| Hapoel Jerusalem | 12th | 1999–2000 | 7th | 2021-2022 | 0 | Never |
| Hapoel Petah Tikva | 6th | 1999–2000 | 16th | 2025–2026 | 5 | 1962-63 |
| Hapoel Ramat Gan | 2nd Liga Leumit | 2009–10 | 4th | 2026–2027 | 1 | 1963–64 |
| Hapoel Tel Aviv | 4th | 1999–2000 | 26th | 2025–2026 | 13 | 2009–2010 |
| Ironi Tiberias | 9th | 2024–2025 | 3nd | 2024–2025 | 0 | Never |
| Ironi Kiryat Shmona | 8th | 2007–2008 | 18th | 2024–2025 | 1 | 2011–2012 |
| Maccabi Haifa | 5th | 1999–2000 | 28th | 1999–2000 | 15 | 2022–2023 |
| Maccabi Netanya | 7th | 2003–2004 | 25rd | 2017–2018 | 5 | 1982–1983 |
| Maccabi Petah Tikva | 1st Liga Leumit | 1999–2000 | 23rd | 2026–2027 | 0 | Never |
| Maccabi Tel Aviv | 3rd | 1999–2000 | 28th | 1999–2000 | 26 | 2024–2025 |

== Sponsorship ==
In recent years, the league has been sponsored. The sponsor has been able to determine the league's sponsorship name. The list below details who the sponsors have been and what they called the competition:

- 1999–2002: Pelephone – a mobile phone company (Ligat Pelephone)
- 2005–2010: Toto Winner Organization – the Israeli Sports Betting Board (Ligat Toto)
- 2010–2016: Toto Winner Organization – the Israeli Sports Betting Board (Ligat Winner)
- 2016–2018: Toto Winner Organization – the Israeli Sports Betting Board (Ligat Ha'al)
- 2018–2019: Japanika – Asian restaurant (Ligat Japanika)
- 2019–2022: Tel Aviv Stock Exchange – Stock Exchange (Ligat Habursa Leniyarot Erech)
- 2022–2024: ONE ZERO – Digital Bank (Ligat ONE ZERO)
- 2024- : Toto Winner Organization – the Israeli Sports Betting Board (Ligat Toto Winner)

== Number of foreigners ==
Teams are limited to eight foreign players per team. Special circumstances such as Druze players from the Golan (no citizenship) or cases such as that of Toto Tamuz, do not count against the foreign player limit. In addition, players who play in the league for 6 consecutive years do not count against the foreign player limit. Also, Jewish players and players who are married to Israelis are exempt from these restrictions, as they are entitled to Israeli citizenship.

== Broadcast rights ==
=== Television ===
Israeli Premier League games are broadcast live on Sport 1, Sport 1 HD, and Sport 2 channels, with the big match of the week which is reserved to be shown by Sport 5 and Channel 1 HD network television. There is also a league review show on Saturday nights at Sport 5 channel.

Abroad, rights to broadcasting in Hebrew are owned by The Israeli Network which broadcasts the matches in the United States, Canada, Australia, New Zealand, Panama, Costa Rica and in Europe.

In the United Kingdom, William Hill broadcasts matches live with English commentary on their online television service, William Hill TV.

=== Radio ===
The rights of broadcasting on the radio belongs to Radio Tel Aviv since 2011, which broadcast alongside Radio Haifa, Radio Darom, Radio Galei Zahal and Radio Darom 101.5 in a show called Saturday of Football which also broadcasts live on ONE TV channel.

=== Internet ===
The big match of the week is shown on the Channel 1 website. Since 2010, games summaries are shown online by Ynet, ONE and Sport 5.

=== Cellular ===
Since 2012, ONE owns the broadcasting rights, which was previously owned by Sport 5.

== Revenue ==
Main sources of revenue for the clubs:

- Broadcast rights
- Ticket sales
- Merchandise
- Toto Winner – The Israeli Sports Betting Council
- Sponsorship

== UEFA league ranking ==
Country ranking in European Leagues

UEFA League Ranking for the 2021–2026 period:

- 19. (20) (Sweden) Allsvenskan (29.625)
- 20. (21) (Croatia) Croatian Football League (28.156)
- 21. (18) (Israel) Israeli Premier League (27.500)
- 22. (24) (Hungary) Nemzeti Bajnokság I (27.187)
- 23. (23) (Ukraine) Ukrainian Premier League (25.912)

== Champions ==
For the complete list read the main article.

=== Performance by club ===
A star above the crest is awarded for every five titles.

| Club | Titles | Runners-up | Winning seasons |
|---|---|---|---|
| Maccabi Tel Aviv | 26 | 12 | 1935–36, 1937, 1939, 1941–42, 1946–47, 1949–50, 1951–52, 1953–54, 1955–56, 1957–58, 1966–68, 1969–70, 1971–72, 1976–77, 1978–79, 1991–92, 1994–95, 1995–96, 2002–03, 2012–13, 2013–14, 2014–15, 2018–19, 2019–20, 2023–24, 2024–25 |
| Maccabi Haifa | 15 | 10 | 1983–84, 1984–85, 1988–89, 1990–91, 1993–94, 2000–01, 2001–02, 2003–04, 2004–05, 2005–06, 2008–09, 2010–11, 2020–21, 2021–22, 2022–23 |
| Hapoel Tel Aviv | 13 | 16 | 1933–34, 1934–35, 1938–39, 1940–41, 1943–44, 1956–57, 1965–66, 1968–69, 1980–81, 1985–86, 1987–88, 1999–2000, 2009–10 |
| Hapoel Petah Tikva | 6 | 10 | 1954–55, 1958–59, 1959–60, 1960–61, 1961–62, 1962–63 |
| Beitar Jerusalem | 6 | 7 | 1986–87, 1992–93, 1996–97, 1997–98, 2006–07, 2007–08 |
| Hapoel Be'er Sheva | 6 | 4 | 1974–75, 1975–76, 2015–16, 2016–17, 2017–18, 2025–26 |
| Maccabi Netanya | 5 | 5 | 1970–71, 1973–74, 1977–78, 1979–80, 1982–83 |
| Hakoah Ramat Gan | 2 | — | 1964–65, 1972–73 |
| Bnei Yehuda Tel Aviv | 1 | 3 | 1989–90 |
| Hapoel Haifa | 1 | 1 | 1998–99 |
| Ironi Kiryat Shmona | 1 | 1 | 2011–12 |
| British Police (Note: British Police ceased to exist along its parent organisation, the Palestine Police Force, in 1948.) | 1 | — | 1931–32 |
| Hapoel Ramat Gan | 1 | — | 1963–64 |
| Hapoel Kfar Saba | 1 | — | 1981–82 |

=== Israeli Premier League (1999–present) ===
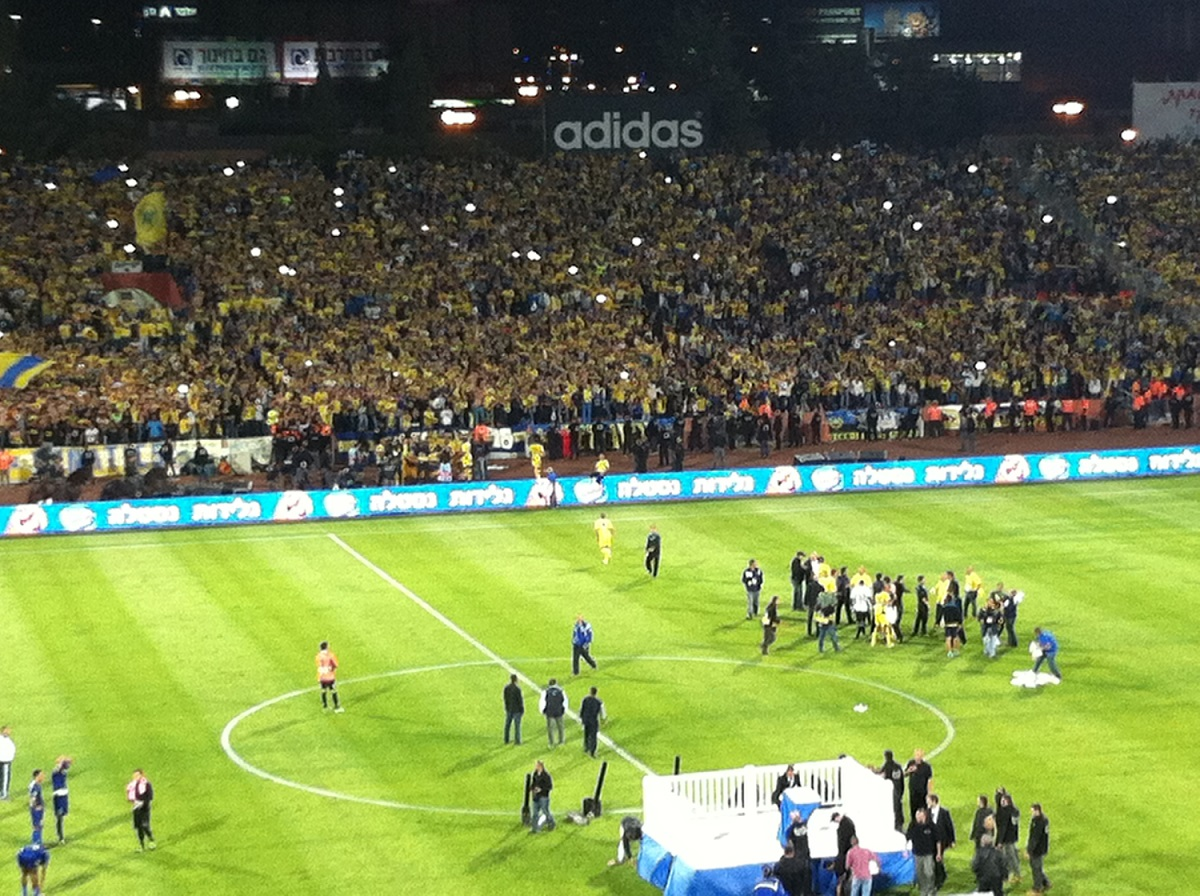
Maccabi Tel Aviv celebrating their league winners title at the end of the 2012–13 season

When the Israeli Premier League became the top division of Israeli football in 1999–2000, Liga Leumit became the second division. Since then, only six clubs have won the title; Hapoel Tel Aviv, Ironi Kiryat Shmona, Maccabi Haifa, Maccabi Tel Aviv, Beitar Jerusalem and Hapoel Be'er Sheva. Hapoel Tel Aviv, Maccabi Haifa, Maccabi Tel Aviv and Beitar Jerusalem are sometimes referred to as the "Big Four" of Israeli football.

Having won nine titles in the league's 23 seasons, the most successful club during this period is Maccabi Haifa; during the same period Maccabi Tel Aviv have added six to their total while Beitar Jerusalem and Hapoel Tel Aviv have won two championships each. Although Hapoel Tel Aviv have only finished top of the league twice since 1999—in 1999–2000 and ten years later in 2009–10—they have won the double on both occasions. This achievement was matched by Beitar Jerusalem in 2007–08.

Ironi Kiryat Shmona won their first championship during the 2011–12 season, thereby becoming the first northern title-winners. Maccabi Tel Aviv then won three titles in a row, including a Treble in 2014–15.

Key

| ^{†} | Won the Israel State Cup during the same season. |
| ^{‡} | Won the League Cup during the same season. |
| ^{§} | Won both cups during the same season. |
| (titles) | A running tally of the total number of championships won by each club is kept in brackets. |

| Season | Winners (titles) | Runners-up | Third place | Top scorer | Goals | Notes |
|---|---|---|---|---|---|---|
| 1999–2000 | Hapoel Tel Aviv (11)^{† (Note: Won the Israel State Cup during the same season.)} | Maccabi Haifa | Hapoel Petah Tikva | Assi Tubi (Maccabi Petah Tikva) | 27 | – |
| 2000–01 | Maccabi Haifa (6) | Hapoel Tel Aviv | Hapoel Haifa^{‡ (Note: Won the League Cup during the same season.)} | Avi Nimni (Maccabi Tel Aviv) | 25 | |
| 2001–02 | Maccabi Haifa (7) | Hapoel Tel Aviv^{‡} | Maccabi Tel Aviv^{†} | Kobi Refua (Maccabi Petah Tikva) | 18 | – |
| 2002–03 | Maccabi Tel Aviv (19) | Maccabi Haifa^{‡} | Hapoel Tel Aviv | Yaniv Abargil (Hapoel Kfar Saba) • Shay Holtzman (Ironi Rishon LeZion / F.C. Ashdod) | 18 | – |
| 2003–04 | Maccabi Haifa (8) | Maccabi Tel Aviv | Maccabi Petah Tikva^{‡} | Ofir Haim (Hapoel Be'er Sheva) • Shay Holtzman (F.C. Ashdod) | 16 | – |
| 2004–05 | Maccabi Haifa (9) | Maccabi Petah Tikva | F.C. Ashdod | Roberto Colautti (Maccabi Haifa) | 19 | – |
| 2005–06 | Maccabi Haifa (10)^{‡} | Hapoel Tel Aviv | Beitar Jerusalem | Shay Holtzman (F.C. Ashdod) | 18 | – |
| 2006–07 | Beitar Jerusalem (5) | Maccabi Netanya | Maccabi Tel Aviv | Yaniv Azran (F.C. Ashdod) | 15 | – |
| 2007–08 | Beitar Jerusalem (6)^{†} | Maccabi Netanya | Ironi Kiryat Shmona | Samuel Yeboah (Hapoel Kfar Saba) | 15 | – |
| 2008–09 | Maccabi Haifa (11) | Hapoel Tel Aviv | Beitar Jerusalem^{†} | Barak Yitzhaki (Beitar Jerusalem) • Shimon Abuhatzira (Hapoel Petah Tikva) • Eliran Atar (Bnei Yehuda) | 14 | – |
| 2009–10 | Hapoel Tel Aviv (13)^{†} | Maccabi Haifa | Maccabi Tel Aviv | Shlomi Arbeitman (Maccabi Haifa) | 28 | – |
| 2010–11 | Maccabi Haifa (12) | Hapoel Tel Aviv ^{†} | Maccabi Tel Aviv | Toto Tamuz (Hapoel Tel Aviv) | 21 | – |
| 2011–12 | Ironi Kiryat Shmona (1)^{‡} | Hapoel Tel Aviv | Bnei Yehuda | Achmad Saba'a (Maccabi Netanya) | 20 | – |
| 2012–13 | Maccabi Tel Aviv (20) | Maccabi Haifa | Hapoel Tel Aviv | Eliran Atar (Maccabi Tel Aviv) | 22 | – |
| 2013–14 | Maccabi Tel Aviv (21) | Hapoel Be'er Sheva | Ironi Kiryat Shmona^{†} | Eran Zahavi (Maccabi Tel Aviv) | 29 | – |
| 2014–15 | Maccabi Tel Aviv (22)^{§ (Note: Won both cups during the same season.)} | Ironi Kiryat Shmona | Hapoel Be'er Sheva | Eran Zahavi (Maccabi Tel Aviv) | 27 | – |
| 2015–16 | Hapoel Be'er Sheva (3) | Maccabi Tel Aviv | Beitar Jerusalem | Eran Zahavi (Maccabi Tel Aviv) | 35 | – |
| 2016–17 | Hapoel Be'er Sheva (4) ^{‡} | Maccabi Tel Aviv | Beitar Jerusalem | Viðar Örn Kjartansson (Maccabi Tel Aviv) | 19 | – |
| 2017–18 | Hapoel Be'er Sheva (5) | Maccabi Tel Aviv^{‡} | Beitar Jerusalem | Dia Saba (Maccabi Netanya) | 24 | – |
| 2018–19 | Maccabi Tel Aviv (23)^{‡} | Maccabi Haifa | Hapoel Be'er Sheva | Ben Sahar (Hapoel Be'er Sheva) | 15 | – |
| 2019–20 | Maccabi Tel Aviv (24) | Maccabi Haifa | Beitar Jerusalem^{‡} | Nikita Rukavytsya (Maccabi Haifa) | 22 | – |
| 2020–21 | Maccabi Haifa (13) | Maccabi Tel Aviv^{§} | Ashdod | Nikita Rukavytsya (Maccabi Haifa) | 19 | – |
| 2021–22 | Maccabi Haifa (14)^{‡} | Hapoel Be'er Sheva^{†} | Maccabi Tel Aviv | Omer Atzili (Maccabi Haifa) | 20 | – |
| 2022–23 | Maccabi Haifa (15) | Hapoel Be'er Sheva | Maccabi Tel Aviv | Omer Atzili (Maccabi Haifa) | 21 | – |
| 2023–24 | Maccabi Tel Aviv (25)^{‡} | Maccabi Haifa | Hapoel Be'er Sheva | Dean David (Maccabi Haifa) • Eran Zahavi (Maccabi Tel Aviv) | 20 | – |
| 2024–25 | Maccabi Tel Aviv (26)^{‡} | Hapoel Be'er Sheva^{†} | Maccabi Haifa | Guy Melamed (Hapoel Haifa, Maccabi Haifa) | 21 | – |
| 2025–26 | Hapoel Be'er Sheva (6) | Beitar Jerusalem^{‡} | Maccabi Tel Aviv^{†} | Dor Peretz (Maccabi Tel Aviv) | 19 | – |

== "Big Four" dominance ==
"Big Four" since the start of the Israeli Premier League
| Season | BEI | HTA | MHA | MTA |
|---|---|---|---|---|
| 1999–2000 | 5 | 1 | 2 | 6 |
| 2000–01 | 5 | 2 | 1 | 4 |
| 2001–02 | 10 | 2 | 1 | 3 |
| 2002–03 | 9 | 3 | 2 | 1 |
| 2003–04 | 9 | 5 | 1 | 2 |
| 2004–05 | 4 | 9 | 1 | 8 |
| 2005–06 | 3 | 2 | 1 | 6 |
| 2006–07 | 1 | 4 | 5 | 3 |
| 2007–08 | 1 | 7 | 5 | 6 |
| 2008–09 | 3 | 2 | 1 | 6 |
| 2009–10 | 5 | 1 | 2 | 3 |
| 2010–11 | 11 | 2 | 1 | 3 |
| 2011–12 | 9 | 2 | 5 | 6 |
| 2012–13 | 10 | 3 | 2 | 1 |
| 2013–14 | 7 | 4 | 5 | 1 |
| 2014–15 | 4 | 8 | 5 | 1 |
| 2015–16 | 3 | 9 | 4 | 2 |
| 2016–17 | 3 | 14 | 6 | 2 |
| 2017–18 | 3 | — | 10 | 2 |
| 2018–19 | 7 | 8 | 2 | 1 |
| 2019–20 | 3 | 5 | 2 | 1 |
| 2020–21 | 10 | 11 | 1 | 2 |
| 2021–22 | 10 | 5 | 1 | 3 |
| 2022–23 | 8 | 10 | 1 | 3 |
| 2023–24 | 11 | 13 | 2 | 1 |
| 2024–25 | 4 | — | 3 | 1 |
| 2025–26 | 2 | 4 | 5 | 3 |

Since the 2015–16 season, the Big Four's dominance has been challenged by Hapoel Be'er Sheva, winning 3 successive championships, they also finished runners up in the 2021–22 and 2024-25 seasons.

Notably, three of the big four teams all finished near or at the bottom of the table at some point. (Hapoel Tel Aviv has been the only one to be relegated so far)

== Top scorers by season ==
| Season | Player | Goals | Club |
|---|---|---|---|
| 1999–2000 | (Israel) Assi Tubi | 27 | Maccabi Petah Tikva |
| 2000–01 | (Israel) Avi Nimni | 25 | Maccabi Tel Aviv |
| 2001–02 | (Israel) Kobi Refua | 18 | Maccabi Petah Tikva |
| 2002–03 | (Israel) Yaniv Abargil | 18 | Hapoel Kfar Saba |
| 2002–03 | (Israel) Shay Holtzman | 18 | Ironi Rishon LeZion, F.C. Ironi Ashdod |
| 2003–04 | (Israel) Ofir Haim | 16 | Hapoel Be'er Sheva |
| 2003–04 | (Israel) Shay Holtzman | 16 | F.C. Ironi Ashdod |
| 2004–05 | (Israel) Roberto Colautti | 19 | Maccabi Haifa |
| 2005–06 | (Israel) Shay Holtzman | 18 | F.C. Ironi Ashdod |
| 2006–07 | (Israel) Yaniv Azran | 15 | F.C. Ironi Ashdod |
| 2007–08 | (Ghana) Samuel Yeboah | 15 | Hapoel Kfar Saba |
| 2008–09 | (Israel) Barak Yitzhaki | 14 | Beitar Jerusalem |
| 2008–09 | (Israel) Shimon Abuhatzira | 14 | Hapoel Petah Tikva |
| 2008–09 | (Israel) Eliran Atar | 14 | Bnei Yehuda |
| 2009–10 | (Israel) Shlomi Arbeitman | 28 | Maccabi Haifa |
| 2010–11 | (Israel) Toto Tamuz | 21 | Hapoel Tel Aviv |
| 2011–12 | (Israel) Ahmad Saba'a | 20 | Maccabi Netanya |
| 2012–13 | (Israel) Eliran Atar | 22 | Maccabi Tel Aviv |
| 2013–14 | (Israel) Eran Zahavi | 29 | Maccabi Tel Aviv |
| 2014–15 | (Israel) Eran Zahavi | 27 | Maccabi Tel Aviv |
| 2015–16 | (Israel) Eran Zahavi | 35 | Maccabi Tel Aviv |
| 2016–17 | (Iceland) Viðar Örn Kjartansson | 19 | Maccabi Tel Aviv |
| 2017–18 | (Israel) Dia Saba | 24 | Maccabi Netanya |
| 2018–19 | (Israel) Ben Sahar | 15 | Hapoel Be'er Sheva |
| 2019–20 | (Australia) Nikita Rukavytsya | 22 | Maccabi Haifa |
| 2020–21 | (Australia) Nikita Rukavytsya | 19 | Maccabi Haifa |
| 2021–22 | (Israel) Omer Atzili | 20 | Maccabi Haifa |
| 2022–23 | (Israel) Omer Atzili | 21 | Maccabi Haifa |
| 2023–24 | (Israel) Dean David | 20 | Maccabi Haifa |
| 2023–24 | (Israel) Eran Zahavi | 20 | Maccabi Tel Aviv |
| 2024–25 | (Israel) Guy Melamed | 21 | Hapoel Haifa, Maccabi Haifa |
| 2025–26 | (Israel) Dor Peretz | 19 | Maccabi Tel Aviv |

== Individual records ==
=== Appearances ===
As of 20 December 2022

| Rank | Player | Appearances |
|---|---|---|
| 1 | (Israel) Arik Benado | 573 |
| 2 | (Israel) Rafi Cohen | 546 |
| 3 | (Israel) Walid Badir | 531 |
| 4 | (Israel) Alon Harazi | 526 |
| 5 | (Israel) Gidi Damti | 519 |
| 6 | (Israel) Liran Strauber | 513 |
| 7 | (Israel) Shlomo Iluz | 509 |
| 8 | (Israel) Miko Bello | 498 |
| 9 | (Israel) Yigal Antebi | 494 |
| 10 | (Israel) Alon Hazan | 483 |

=== Top scorers ===
As of 5 June 2025

| Rank | Player | Goals |
|---|---|---|
| 1 | (Israel) Alon Mizrahi | 206 |
| 2 | (Israel) Oded Machnes | 197 |
| 3 | (Israel) Avi Nimni | 194 |
| 4 | (Israel) Moshe Romano | 192 |
| 5 | (Israel) Eran Zahavi | 177 |
| 6 | (Israel) Shay Holtzman | 169 |
| 7 | (Israel) Mordechai Spiegler | 168 |
| 8 | (Israel) Uri Malmilian | 159 |
| 9 | (Israel) David Lavi | 158 |
| 10 | (Israel) Nahum Stelmach | 155 |

=== Player transfer fees ===
Top transfer fees received by Israeli Premier League clubs
| Rank | Player | Fee (min.) | Date | Transfer | | Reference(s) |
|---|---|---|---|---|---|---|
| 1 | (Israel) Anan Khalaily | €7.5M | 17 June 2024 | Maccabi Haifa | (Belgium) Saint-Gilloise | |
| 2 | (Brazil) Weslley Patati | €7.3M | 28 August 2025 | Maccabi Tel Aviv | (Netherlands) Alkmaar | |
| 3 | (Israel) Eran Zahavi | €7.23M | 29 June 2016 | Maccabi Tel Aviv | (China) Guangzhou R&F | |
| 4 | (Israel) Oscar Gloukh | €7M | 27 January 2023 | Maccabi Tel Aviv | (Austria) Red Bull Salzburg | |
| 5 | (Israel) Manor Solomon | €6M | 11 January 2019 | Maccabi Petah Tikva | (Ukraine) Shakhtar Donetsk | |
| 6 | (Israel) Daniel Peretz | €5M | 25 August 2023 | Maccabi Tel Aviv | (Germany) Bayern Munich | |
| 7 | (Angola) Felício Milson | €5M | 26 July 2024 | Maccabi Tel Aviv | (Serbia) Red Star Belgrade | |
| 8 | (Serbia) Predrag Rajković | €5M | 23 July 2019 | Maccabi Tel Aviv | (France) Reims | |
| 9 | (Nigeria) Yakubu Ayegbeni | €4.75M | 6 January 2003 | Maccabi Haifa | (England) Portsmouth | |
| 10 | (Israel) Dor Turgeman | €4.7M | 20 August 2025 | Maccabi Tel Aviv | (United States) New England Revolution | |

== All-time table ==
The All-time Israeli Premier League table is a cumulative record of all match results, points and goals of every team that has played in the Israeli Premier League since its inception in 1999. The table that follows is accurate as of the end of the 2024–25 season. Teams in green are part of the 2026–27 Israeli Premier League. Numbers in bold are the record (highest) numbers in each column.

| Pos. | Club | S | Pld | W | D | L | GF | GFPG | GA | GAPG | GD | Pts | 1° | 2° | 3° | R | Avg. Pts |
|---|---|---|---|---|---|---|---|---|---|---|---|---|---|---|---|---|---|
| 1 | Maccabi Tel Aviv | **27** | **952** | **522** | **231** | 199 | 1614 | 1.695 | 860 | 0.903 | **752** | **1782** | 8 | 5 | **7** | | 66 |
| 2 | Maccabi Haifa | **27** | 949 | 519 | 215 | 215 | **1643** | **1.731** | 923 | 0.973 | 720 | 1769 | **10** | 7 | 1 | | 65.52 |
| 3 | Beitar Jerusalem | **27** | 931 | 381 | 247 | 303 | 1304 | 1.401 | 1129 | 1.213 | 175 | 1378 | 2 | 1 | **6** | | 51.04 |
| 4 | Hapoel Tel Aviv | 25 | 859 | 374 | 242 | 243 | 1207 | 1.405 | 919 | 1.07 | 288 | 1347 | 2 | **6** | 2 | 2 | 53.88 |
| 5 | Hapoel Be'er Sheva | 21 | 716 | 359 | 179 | 178 | 1136 | 1.587 | 812 | 1.134 | 324 | 1254 | 4 | 4 | 3 | 1 | 59.71 |
| 6 | Maccabi Netanya | 24 | 824 | 290 | 217 | 317 | 1051 | 1.275 | 1135 | 1.377 | -84 | 1087 | | 1 | | 3 | 45.29 |
| 7 | F.C. Ashdod | 26 | 883 | 273 | 240 | **370** | 1045 | 1.183 | **1256** | 1.422 | -211 | 1059 | | | 2 | 2 | 40.73 |
| 8 | Maccabi Petah Tikva | 23 | 783 | 268 | 216 | 299 | 894 | 1.142 | 979 | 1.25 | -85 | 1020 | | 1 | 1 | 4 | 44.35 |
| 9 | Bnei Yehuda | 20 | 688 | 233 | 184 | 271 | 781 | 1.169 | 873 | 1.269 | -92 | 883 | | | 1 | 3 | 44.15 |
| 10 | Hapoel Haifa | 21 | 722 | 232 | 209 | 281 | 855 | 1.184 | 907 | 1.256 | -52 | 905 | | | 1 | 2 | 43.1 |
| 11 | Bnei Sakhnin | 21 | 714 | 223 | 204 | 297 | 711 | 0.996 | 935 | 1.31 | -224 | 838 | | | | 2 | 39.95 |
| 12 | Ironi Kiryat Shmona | 17 | 579 | 208 | 160 | 211 | 715 | 1.235 | 702 | 1.219 | 13 | 784 | 1 | 1 | 2 | 2 | 46.12 |
| 13 | Hapoel Petah Tikva | 15 | 517 | 148 | 140 | 229 | 622 | 1.203 | 781 | 1.511 | -159 | 572 | | | 1 | 4 | 38.13 |
| 14 | Hapoel Kfar Saba | 9 | 303 | 72 | 90 | 141 | 291 | 0.96 | 436 | 1.439 | -145 | 303 | | | | 5 | **33.67** |
| 15 | Hapoel Acre | 8 | 270 | 72 | 81 | 117 | 288 | 1.067 | 389 | 1.441 | -101 | 295 | | | | 1 | 36.88 |
| 16 | Hapoel Ra'anana | 8 | 269 | 66 | 81 | 122 | 251 | 0.933 | 367 | 1.364 | -116 | 279 | | | | 2 | 34.88 |
| 17 | Hapoel Hadera | 7 | 234 | 68 | 65 | 101 | 224 | 0.957 | 337 | 1.44 | -113 | 269 | | | | 1 | 38.43 |
| 18 | Hapoel Jerusalem | 6 | 207 | 56 | 52 | 99 | 274 | 1.343 | 224 | 1.082 | 50 | 210 | | | | 1 | 35 |
| 19 | Hapoel Rishon LeZion | 5 | 180 | 41 | 41 | 98 | 195 | 1.083 | 346 | 1.756 | -21 | 164 | | | | 2 | 32.8 |
| 20 | Maccabi Bnei Reineh | 4 | 135 | 37 | 31 | 78 | 132 | 0.978 | 210 | 1.556 | -78 | 142 | | | | 1 | 35.5 |
| 21 | Hapoel Ramat HaSharon | 3 | 106 | 32 | 23 | 51 | 97 | 0.915 | 154 | 1.453 | -57 | 119 | | | | 1 | 39.67 |
| 22 | Hapoel Nof HaGalil | 3 | 99 | 26 | 29 | 44 | 96 | 0.97 | 146 | 1.475 | -50 | 107 | | | | 2 | 35.67 |
| 23 | Maccabi Herzliya | 3 | 105 | 25 | 24 | 56 | 112 | 1.067 | 179 | 1.705 | -67 | 99 | | | | 2 | 33 |
| 24 | Hapoel Ramat Gan | 3 | 103 | 19 | 29 | 55 | 95 | 0.922 | 161 | 1.563 | -66 | 86 | | | | 2 | 28.67 |
| 25 | Hapoel Ashkelon | 3 | 101 | 20 | 25 | 56 | 159 | 0.792 | 159 | 1.574 | -79 | 85 | | | | 2 | 28.33 |
| 26 | Ironi Tiberias | 2 | 66 | 20 | 19 | 27 | 73 | 1.106 | 101 | 1.53 | -28 | 66 | | | | | 33 |
| 27 | Hakoah Amidar Ramat Gan | 2 | 66 | 12 | 21 | 33 | 58 | 0.879 | 100 | 1.515 | -42 | 57 | | | | 2 | 28.5 |
| 28 | Sektzia Ness Ziona | 2 | 66 | 13 | 18 | 35 | 54 | 0.818 | 102 | 1.545 | -48 | 57 | | | | 2 | 28.5 |
| 29 | Maccabi Ahi Nazareth | 2 | 68 | 15 | 13 | 40 | 73 | 1.074 | 143 | 2.103 | -70 | 55 | | | | 2 | 27.5 |
| 30 | Maccabi Kiryat Gat | 1 | 33 | 7 | 6 | 20 | 34 | 1.03 | 58 | 1.758 | -24 | 27 | | | | 1 | 27 |
| 31 | Hapoel Tzafririm Holon | 1 | 38 | 4 | 4 | 30 | 25 | 0.658 | 85 | **2.237** | -60 | 16 | | | | 1 | 16 |
| Total | | 27 | 12,566 | 4,635 | 3,336 | 4,616 | 14,957 | | 1.19 | | – | 17,114 | 27 | | | - | 634.96 |

League or status at 2026–27:
| Ligat HaAl |
| Liga Leumit |
| Liga Alef |
| Liga Bet |
| Liga Gimel |
| Clubs that no longer exist |

== Record of finishing positions of clubs in the Israeli Premier League ==
Table correct as at the end of the 2025–26 Israeli Premier League season.

| Club | Best result | S | 99–00 | 00–01 | 01–02 | 02–03 | 03–04 | 04–05 | 05–06 | 06–07 | 07–08 | 08–09 | 09–10 | 10–11 | 11–12 | 12–13 | 13–14 | 14–15 | 15–16 | 16–17 | 17–18 | 18–19 | 19–20 | 20–21 | 21–22 | 22–23 | 23–24 | 24–25 | 25–26 | 26–27 |
|---|---|---|---|---|---|---|---|---|---|---|---|---|---|---|---|---|---|---|---|---|---|---|---|---|---|---|---|---|---|---|
| Maccabi Haifa | 1st (x10) | 28 | 2 | 1 | 1 | 2 | 1 | 1 | 1 | 5 | 5 | 1 | 2 | 1 | 5 | 2 | 5 | 5 | 4 | 6 | 10 | 2 | 2 | 1 | 1 | 1 | 2 | 3 | 5 | |
| Maccabi Tel Aviv | 1st (x8) | 28 | 6 | 4 | 3 | 1 | 2 | 8 | 6 | 3 | 6 | 6 | 3 | 3 | 6 | 1 | 1 | 1 | 2 | 2 | 2 | 1 | 1 | 2 | 3 | 3 | 1 | 1 | 3 | |
| Beitar Jerusalem | 1st (x2) | 28 | 5 | 5 | 10 | 9 | 9 | 4 | 3 | 1 | 1 | 3 | 5 | 11 | 9 | 10 | 7 | 4 | 3 | 3 | 3 | 7 | 3 | 10 | 10 | 8 | 11 | 4 | 2 | |
| Hapoel Tel Aviv | 1st (x2) | 26 | 1 | 2 | 2 | 3 | 5 | 9 | 2 | 4 | 7 | 2 | 1 | 2 | 2 | 3 | 4 | 8 | 9 | 14 | | 8 | 5 | 11 | 5 | 10 | 13 | | 4 | |
| F.C. Ashdod | 3rd (x2) | 26 | 8 | 10 | 4 | 7 | 7 | 3 | 8 | 7 | 8 | 8 | 6 | 12 | 7 | 7 | 8 | 14 | | 9 | 12 | 12 | 8 | 3 | 9 | 6 | 10 | 11 | 13 | |
| Maccabi Petah Tikva | 2nd (x1) | 24 | 4 | 8 | 8 | 6 | 3 | 2 | 5 | 6 | 10 | 7 | 8 | 7 | 14 | | 12 | 6 | 7 | 4 | 8 | 13 | | 5 | 13 | | 8 | 13 | | |
| Maccabi Netanya | 2nd (x2) | 25 | 10 | 7 | 7 | 4 | 11 | | 7 | 2 | 2 | 4 | 10 | 6 | 4 | 13 | | 9 | 14 | | 5 | 4 | 10 | 7 | 4 | 5 | 9 | 6 | 7 | |
| Bnei Yehuda | 3rd (x1) | 20 | 11 | 11 | | 10 | 6 | 6 | 4 | 9 | 9 | 5 | 4 | 4 | 3 | 4 | 14 | | 8 | 11 | 6 | 5 | 7 | 13 | | | | | | |
| Hapoel Be'er Sheva | 1st (x4) | 22 | | | 5 | 5 | 4 | 12 | | | | | 9 | 9 | 13 | 8 | 2 | 3 | 1 | 1 | 1 | 3 | 4 | 4 | 2 | 2 | 3 | 2 | 1 | |
| Hapoel Haifa | 3rd (x1) | 22 | 7 | 3 | 11 | | | 11 | | | | | 11 | 10 | 12 | 9 | 11 | 12 | 12 | 8 | 4 | 11 | 6 | 9 | 11 | 7 | 4 | 5 | 10 | |
| Bnei Sakhnin | 4th (x1) | 22 | | | | | 10 | 10 | 12 | | 4 | 9 | 7 | 13 | 8 | 12 | 6 | 7 | 5 | 5 | 11 | 14 | | 12 | 6 | 9 | 6 | 10 | 11 | |
| Ironi Kiryat Shmona | 1st (x1) | 18 | | | | | | | | | 3 | 12 | | 5 | 1 | 5 | 3 | 2 | 11 | 7 | 7 | 10 | 12 | 6 | 7 | 13 | | 9 | 8 | |
| Hapoel Petah Tikva | 3rd (x1) | 16 | 3 | 6 | 6 | 8 | 8 | 7 | 9 | 12 | | 10 | 13 | 14 | 16 | | | 13 | | | | | | | | | 14 | | 6 | |
| Hapoel Kfar Saba | 8th (x1) | 9 | 12 | | | 11 | | | 10 | 8 | 11 | | | | | | | | 10 | 13 | | | 11 | 14 | | | | | | |
| Hapoel Ironi Acre | 8th (x1) | 8 | | | | | | | | | | | 12 | 8 | 10 | 11 | 10 | 11 | 13 | | 14 | | | | | | | | | |
| Hapoel Ra'anana | 6th (x1) | 8 | | | | | | | | | | | 15 | | | | 9 | 10 | 6 | 10 | 9 | 9 | 14 | | | | | | | |
| Hapoel Rishon LeZion | 9th (x3) | 5 | 9 | 9 | 9 | 12 | | | | | | | | | 15 | | | | | | | | | | | | | | | |
| Hapoel Hadera | 6th (x1) | 7 | | | | | | | | | | | | | | | | | | | | 6 | 9 | 8 | 8 | 12 | 12 | 14 | | |
| Hapoel Jerusalem | 4th (x1) | 7 | 14 | | | | | | | | | | | | | | | | | | | | | | 12 | 4 | 7 | 7 | 12 | |
| Hapoel Nir Ramat HaSharon | 6th (x1) | 3 | | | | | | | | | | | | | 11 | 6 | 13 | | | | | | | | | | | | | |
| Maccabi Herzliya | 10th (x1) | 3 | 13 | | | | | | | 10 | 12 | | | | | | | | | | | | | | | | | | | |
| Hapoel Ashkelon | 12th (x1) | 3 | | | | | | | | | | | | 15 | | | | | | 12 | 13 | | | | | | | | | |
| Hapoel Ramat Gan | 14th (x2) | 4 | | | | | | | | | | | 14 | 16 | | 14 | | | | | | | | | | | | | | |
| Hapoel Nof HaGalil | 5th (x1) | 3 | | | | | | 5 | 11 | | | | | | | | | | | | | | | | 14 | | | | | |
| Hakoah Amidar Ramat Gan | 11th (x2) | 2 | | | | | | | | 11 | | 11 | | | | | | | | | | | | | | | | | | |
| Maccabi Ahi Nazareth | 12th (x1) | 2 | | | | | 12 | | | | | | 16 | | | | | | | | | | | | | | | | | |
| Sektzia Ness Ziona | 13th (x1) | 2 | | | | | | | | | | | | | | | | | | | | | 13 | | | 14 | | | | |
| Maccabi Kiryat Gat | 12th (x1) | 1 | | | 12 | | | | | | | | | | | | | | | | | | | | | | | | | |
| Hapoel Tzafririm Holon | 12th (x1) | 1 | | 12 | | | | | | | | | | | | | | | | | | | | | | | | | | |
| Maccabi Bnei Reineh | 5th (x1) | 4 | | | | | | | | | | | | | | | | | | | | | | | | 11 | 5 | 8 | 14 | |
| Ironi Tiberias | 9th (x1) | 3 | | | | | | | | | | | | | | | | | | | | | | | | | | 12 | 9 | |

== See also ==
- Football in Israel
- Israel national football team
- Israel Football League
- Ligat Nashim
