= Maccabi Akhi Nazareth F.C. =

Israeli football club

Maccabi Akhi Nazareth
- Full name: Maccabi Akhi Nazareth Football Club
- Nicknames: The Green Nazarenes, Akhaa', Nazareth, The Greens from Nazareth
- Founded: 1967; 59 years ago
- Ground: Ilut Stadium, Ilut
- Capacity: 4,932
- Chairman: Avudia Yusuf
- Manager: Alaa Saig
- League: Liga Alef North
- 2025–26: Liga Alef North, 1st (promoted)
Home colours	Away colours

Maccabi Akhi Nazareth Football Club (Hebrew: מועדון כדורגל מכבי אחי נצרת, romanized: Mo'adon Kaduregel Makabi Aḥi Natzrat; Arabic: نادي كرة القدم مكابي اخاء الناصرة, romanized: Nādī Kurat al-Qadam Makābī ’Aḫā’ an-Nāṣira) is an Israeli football club based in Nazareth. The club is currently in the Liga Alef North and plays at the Ilut Stadium in Ilut on the outskirts of the city.

== History ==
A chart showing the progress of Maccabi Ahi Nazareth through the Israeli football league system, from 1974–75 to the present

The club was formed in 1968, and played in Liga Gimel until 1975. In 1998 they were promoted to Liga Artzit (then the second tier), finishing eighth in the league. In 1999–2000 and 2000–01 they finished one place above the relegation zone.

The 2002–03 season saw the club claim the Liga Leumit title, despite being deducted three points for playing an ineligible player, under the leadership of Azmi Nassar. They were promoted to the Israeli Premier League for the first time in their history. Fellow Israeli Arab club Bnei Sakhnin were also promoted, marking the first time two Arab clubs had been in the top division.

However, in their first season in the top division, the club finished bottom and were relegated back to Liga Leumit. The following season they were relegated again (due to a two-point deduction), and dropped back into the third division. In 2005–06 they finished as Liga Artzit runners-up, to make an immediate return to Liga Leumit, where they have remained since.

In 2008–09, the club was promoted to the Israeli Premier League. After one of the worst seasons in the Israeli Premier League the club finished in the last spot of the league, In the last match she lost to Hapoel Ramat Gan 0–7 and were directly relegated to Liga Leumit for the 2010–11 season.

In the 2014–15 Israel State Cup, the club reached the Semi-finals for the first time in their history, after eliminating Maccabi Netanya, FC Ashdod, and Hapoel Kfar Saba. However, in the Semi-finals, they were beaten 0–3 by the eventual cup winners, Maccabi Tel Aviv in Teddy Stadium, Jerusalem.

== Current squad ==
As of 20 August 2026.

No.	Pos.	Nation	Player
1	GK	ISR	Moshe Galanti
3	DF	BRA	Welisson
4	DF	ISR	Nassim Abu Yunes
5	DF	ISR	Fadi Najar
6	DF	ISR	Adham Abu Nasser
7	FW	ISR	Ahmed Abed
8	MF	ISR	Amjad Sliman
9	FW	ISR	Mohammed Awadah
10	MF	ISR	Anas Dabour
11	FW	PAN	Alfredo Stephens
15	DF	ISR	Sanad Esmail
20	DF	ISR	Sfouan Hilo

No.	Pos.	Nation	Player
21	FW	ISR	Hamza Mouwassi
22	FW	ISR	Mohammed Taha
25	MF	ISR	Fares Abbas
26	DF	PLE	Mohammed Abu Ras
30	GK	ISR	Yazen Awad
33	MF	ISR	Mufleh Shalaata
42	MF	LBR	Nohan Kenneh
51	DF	ISR	Eli Balilty
77	MF	ISR	Mohammed Sabah
88	MF	ISR	Ibrahim Abu Ahmed
99	MF	ISR	Liam Eissat

=== Past managers ===
- (Israel) Azmi Nassar
- (Israel) Yehoshua Feigenbaum
- (Israel) Michael Kadosh
- (Israel) Eli Mahpud
- (England) John Gregory
- (Israel) Adham Hadiya
- (Israel) Motti Ivanir
- (Israel) Shlomi Dora
- (Israel) Tal Banin
- (Israel) Rifaat Turk

== Honours ==
- Liga Alef:
  - Winners (1): 1997–98
- Liga Leumit:
  - Winners (1): 2002–03
- Liga Artzit:
  - Runners-up (1): 2005–06
