= Maccabi Kiryat Gat F.C. =

Israeli football club

Maccabi Kiryat Gat עירוני קריית גת
- Full name: Maccabi Kiryat Gat Football Club מועדון כדורגל מכבי קריית גת
- Founded: 1961; 2020
- Ground: Municipal Stadium, Kiryat Gat
- Capacity: 3,500
- Manager: Roman Zolo
- League: Liga Alef South
- 2025–26: Liga Alef South, 1st (promoted)
- Website: https://web.archive.org/web/20110225213458/http://www.mkg.co.il/
| Home colours | Away colours |

Maccabi Kiryat Gat F.C. (Hebrew: מכבי קריית גת) was an Israeli football team based in the southern city of Kiryat Gat. The club's best achievement has been promotion to the Premier League as Liga Leumit runners-up in 2001, after beating Hapoel Beit She'an on the final day of the season. However, in their first season in the top division, they finished at the bottom of the table, six points from safety, and were relegated back to the second tier.

As a result of the overspending while in the top division, the club suffered financial difficulties, and was demoted to the fourth division by the IFA in 2004, where they played for a decade until 2014, when they were promoted to Liga Leumit.

== History ==
A chart showing the progress of Maccabi Kiryat Gat through the Israeli football league system, from 1962–63 to the present

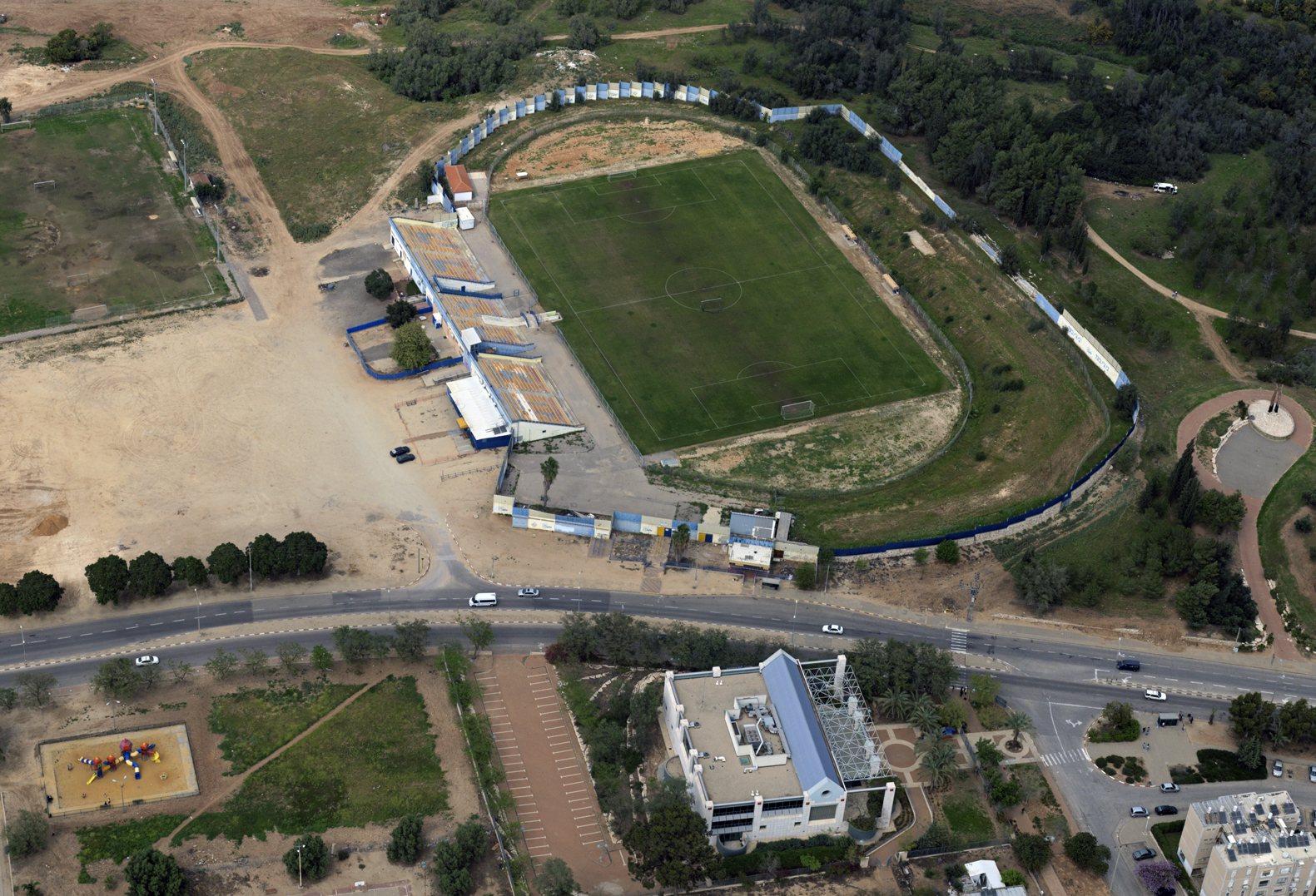
General view kiryat gat Stadium.

The club was established as Maccabi Kiryat Gat in 1961 by Yehuda Ivanir who also served as chairman. In 1969, he bought the Kfar Gavirol F.C., and Maccabi took its place in the Liga Bet.

In the 1978–79 season, the club reached Liga Alef, for the first time in its history, and finished in the second place. however at the end of the season, the club lost in promotion play-off to Hapoel Herzliya, and remained in Liga Alef, up until the 1980–81 season, where the club won Liga Alef South division, and achieved historic promotion to Liga Artzit, the second tier of Israeli football at the time, but dropped, after one season, to Liga Alef, where the club played until 1994 when it made a return to Liga Artzit.

After seven seasons in the second division, Maccabi finished second in the 2000–01 season of Liga Leumit (Liga Leumit replaced Liga Artzit as the new second tier of Israeli football in the 1999–2000 season), and for the first time in history, promoted to the Premier League.

The club has played the 2001–02 season in the Premier League under the management of Gili Landau, and during the season, recorded their biggest win in their history, when Maccabi won 4–0 against Maccabi Haifa, in Kiryat Eliezer Stadium. The club finished last in that season and returned to the Liga Leumit. Maccabi remained in the Second Division, Liga Leumit, until 2004, when the club was forced to relegated to Liga Alef due to heavy financial debts.

In 2006, the club merged with Beitar Kiryat Gat F.C. to one municipal club, thus after lengthy negotiations. For years Maccabi was the only Football Club in Kiryat Gat (except short period with the existence of F.C. Kiryat Gat since 2009 until 2012 when the club was merged into Maccabi).

At the beginning of season 2012–13 the Maccabi changed its name to Ironi Kiryat Gat and after a while returned to the former name: Maccabi Kiryat Gat. Since 2013, the club's sponsor is a Hamei Yoav baths.

In the 2013–14 season, Maccabi won Liga Alef South division, and promoted to Liga Leumit.

In the 2015–16 season, the club finished bottom in Liga Leumit and relegated to Liga Alef.

== Players ==
=== current squad ===
As to 4 August 2026

| No. | Pos. | Nation | Player |
|---|---|---|---|
| 2 | DF | ISR | Tomer Dorazi |
| 3 | DF | ISR | Amir Ella |
| 4 | DF | ISR | Or Zahavi |
| 5 | DF | ISR | Elad Ashram |
| 6 | MF | ISR | Omer Ifrah |
| 8 | MF | ISR | Sali Ganon |
| 9 | FW | ISR | Guy Dahan |
| 11 | FW | ISR | Amir Altoury |
| 12 | DF | ISR | Or Daabul |
| 15 | MF | BLR | Denis Kozlovskiy |

| No. | Pos. | Nation | Player |
|---|---|---|---|
| 16 | DF | ISR | Bar Cohen |
| 17 | DF | ISR | Erez Shifman |
| 19 | FW | ISR | Elvis Spikner |
| 20 | MF | NGA | Paul Emmanuel |
| 23 | MF | ISR | Arad Bar |
| 27 | MF | ISR | Zahi Itzhak |
| 28 | MF | BLR | Pavel Zabelin |
| 32 | DF | ISR | Ilay Sakuri |
| 33 | GK | ISR | Re'em Golan |
| 99 | GK | ISR | Guy Herman |

=== Notable former coaches ===
- Gili Landau

== Women's section ==
The Women's section of the club won the Israeli Women's Cup in 2016 and the Ligat Nashim championship in 2016–17, 2017–2018, 2020–21, 2021–22.

== Honours ==
=== Domestic ===
==== League ====
- Ligat Nashim
    - Winners***

== See also ==
- Maccabi Kiryat Gat B.C.
