= Shay Holtzman =

Israeli footballer

Shay Holtsman שי הולצמן
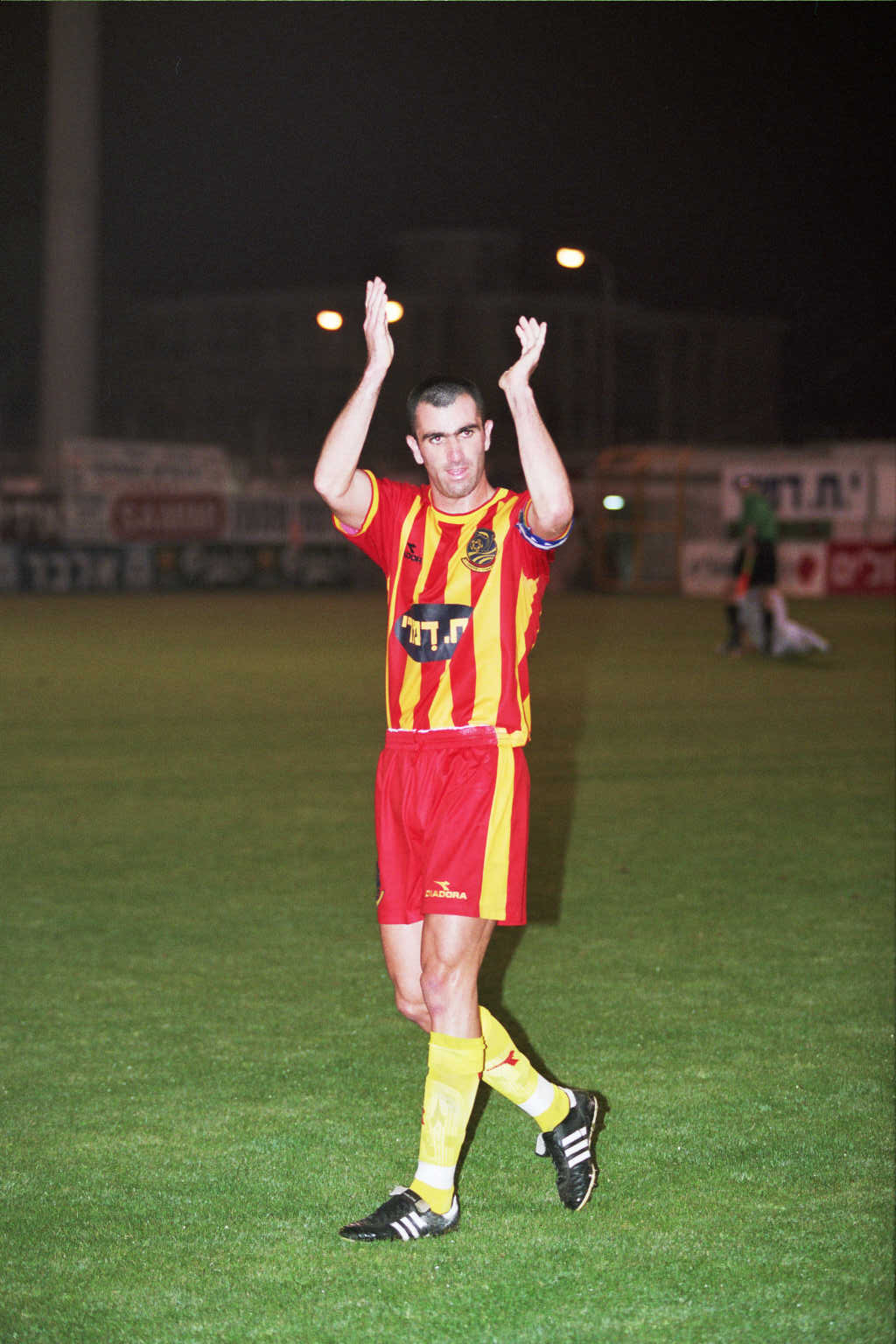

Personal information
- Full name: Shay Holtzman
- Date of birth: January 1, 1974 (age 52)
- Place of birth: Netanya, Israel
- Position: Striker

Youth career
- Maccabi Netanya

Senior career*
Years	Team	Apps	(Gls)
1990–1993	Maccabi Netanya	78	(13)
1993–1994	Maccabi Haifa	41	(10)
1994–1996	Tzafririm Holon	41	(18)
1996–1997	Hapoel Be'er Sheva	28	(11)
1997	Rennes	0	(0)
1997–1998	Beitar Jerusalem	13	(3)
1998	Hapoel Haifa	5	(1)
1998–1999	Austria Wien	15	(3)
1999	Maccabi Netanya	7	(2)
2000–2001	Maccabi Petah Tikva	51	(15)
2001–2002	Ironi Rishon leZion	47	(25)
2002–2009	Ashdod	163	(72)
Total		506	(178)

International career
1990–1991	Israel U-17	4	(3)
	Israel U-18	?	(4)
1992–1995	Israel U-21	34	(14)
1995–2004	Israel	9	(1)

Managerial career
- 2010–2013: Ashdod (assistant manager)
- 2013–2014: Maccabi Netanya (assistant manager)
- * Club domestic league appearances and goals

Shay Holtzman (Hebrew: שי הולצמן; born January 1, 1974) is an Israeli former professional footballer who played as a striker in the top level of Israeli league football for Maccabi Netanya, Maccabi Haifa, Tzafririm Holon, Hapoel Be'er Sheva, Beitar Jerusalem, Hapoel Haifa, Maccabi Petah Tikva, Ironi Rishon leZion, F.C. Ashdod and for the Israel national team. He also played for Austrian club Austria Wien for one season. He is both F.C. Ashdod's and the Israeli Premier League's record goalscorer. After retiring as a player, Holtzman worked as an assistant manager in F.C. Ashdod and Maccabi Netanya.

== Career ==
Holtzman grew in the Maccabi Netanya youth team, and in 1990–91 season he went to the first team of the club until the 1992–93 season. In the 1993–94 season he played in Maccabi Haifa and won with the team in the Israeli Championship and the Toto Cup and took part in Maccabi Haifa's Cup Winners' Cup campaign, scoring two goals.

During the 1994–95 season he went from Maccabi Haifa to Tzafririm Holon, until the 1996–97 season when he transferred to Hapoel Be'er Sheva and won in the Israel State Cup.

In 1997–98 Holtzman went abroad to France, to Stade Rennais but during the season he went back to Israel, to Beitar Jerusalem which he won with the team in the Israeli Championship and the Toto Cup. In the beginning of 1998–99 Holtzman started in Hapoel Haifa but later in the season he went abroad again, to FK Austria Wien of Austria.

In the beginning of the 1999–2000 season Holtzman went back to his local club, Maccabi Netanya, but later he decided to leave again, to Maccabi Petah Tikva. After a year and a half in Petah Tikva, he started the 2001–02 season in Ironi Rishon leZion. That season he finished second place in the top scorers list with 17 goals. During 2002–03 he left Rishon leZion and signed with F.C. Ashdod. Holtzman finished the same season as the co-top scorer with Yaniv Abargil with 18 goals, the next season again he shared the title with Ofir Haim, and in the 2005–06 season he won again in this title but alone.

== Honours ==
=== Team ===
- Israeli football championships: 1993–94, 1997–98
- Israel State Cup: 1997
- Toto Cup: 1997–98

=== Individual ===
- Israeli Premier League top goalscorer: 2002–03, 2003–04, 2005–06
