= List of Maccabi Haifa F.C. players =

Maccabi Haifa Football Club is an Israeli association football club based in Haifa. The club was formed in 1913 as a local branch of the Maccabi movement, and played their first competitive matches before the establishment of the State of Israel. Since then, more than 300 players have made a competitive first team appearance for the club, of whom almost 100 players have made at least 100 appearances (including substitute appearances); those players are listed here, as well as those who have played fewer matches but have made significant contributions to the club's history (e.g. Haim Revivo and Yakubu).

For a list of all Maccabi Haifa players, major or minor, with a Wikipedia article, see Category:Maccabi Haifa F.C. players. For the current Maccabi Haifa first-team squad, see the First-team squad section of the club's main article.

Players are listed according to the date of their first team debut for the club. Appearances and goals are for first-team competitive matches only; friendly matches are excluded.

== List of players ==
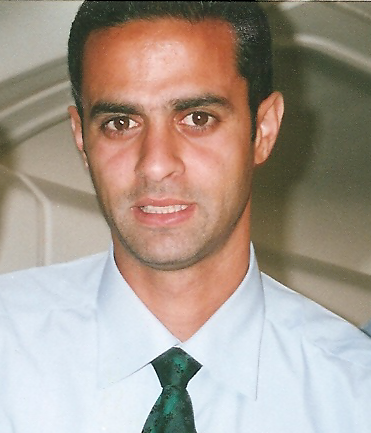
Alon Harazi has made more than 700 appearances for Maccabi Haifa. He is also one of only three Haifa players to have featured in both of the club's only appearances in the UEFA Champions League.

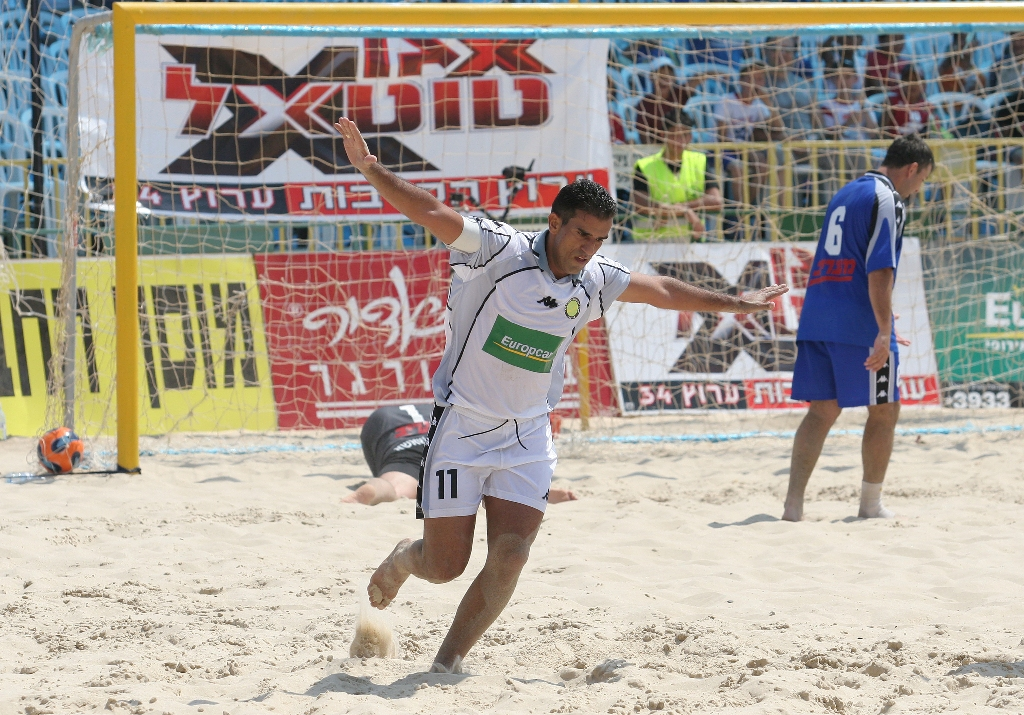
Alon Mizrahi is one of Maccabi Haifa's highest all-time goalscorers.

Table headers

- Apps – Number of games played as a starter
- Sub – Number of games played as a substitute
- Total – Total number of games played, both as a starter and as a substitute

Positions key
GK	Goalkeeper	RB	Right back	RM	Right midfielder	OR	Outside right
CB	Central back	LB	Left back	LM	Left midfielder	OL	Outside left
DF	Defender	FB	Full back	MF	Midfielder	W	Winger
FW	Forward	HB	Half back	CM	Central midfielder		

Statistics correct as of match played 26 May 2025

Name	Nationality	Position	Maccabi Haifa career	Appearances	Goals
Bondy Klein	(Israel)	LB	1947–1953	114	3
Tibi Cohen	(Israel)	CB	1949–1960	158	3
Yisha'ayahu Held	(Israel)	FW	1949–1964	284	72
Jonny Hardy	(Israel)	FW	1951–1963	221	91
Zekharia Ben-Tzvi	(Israel)	LM	1951–1966	228	34
Avraham Menchel	(Israel)	RM	1952–1964	257	83
Asher Almani	(Israel)	LM	1952–1968	307	50
Aharon Amar	(Israel)	FW	1956–1966	149	41
Shalom Vano	(Israel)	RB	1956–1970	141	0
Itzhak Shapira	(Israel)	FW	1957–1962	114	35
Danny Shmulevich-Rom	(Israel)	FW	1958–1971	326	98
Yehezkel Gershoni	(Israel)	GK	1958–1973	238	0
Shmuel Hednes	(Israel)	HB	1960–1970	264	6
Didi Sasson	(Israel)	FW	1962–1971	126	26
Hassan Bostoni	(Israel)	FW	1963–1969	118	23
David Gozlan	(Israel)	LM	1963–1970	221	7
Yisha'ayahu Schwager	(Israel)	CB	1963–1976	410	17
Natan Hirsch	(Israel)	FW	1964–1970	130	30
Mordechai Lubezki	(Israel)	LB	1964–1971	175	3
Aharon Gershgoren	(Israel)	CM	1964–1978	371	36
Karol Rotner	(Israel)	RB	1965–1987	217	5
Haim Hazamos	(Israel)	RB	1968–1973	127	7
Haim Forte	(Israel)	FW	1968–1975	205	20
Yoav Levy	(Israel)	LM	1968–1976	149	33
Moshe Adler	(Israel)	FW	1968–1980	269	54
Motti Berger	(Israel)	CB	1969–1978	231	5
Shlomo Benado	(Israel)	HB	1970–1974	118	10
Itzhak Aharonovich	(Israel)	FW	1971–1980	155	9
Oded Baloush	(Israel)	CM	1973–1981	132	16
Aryeh Efroni	(Israel)	LB	1973–1981	147	1
Menashe Mizrahi	(Israel)	FW	1973–1983	177	44
Emmanuel Schwartz	(Israel)	GK	1974–1978	134	0
Baruch Maman	(Israel)	LM	1974–1987	364	53
Yossi Kramer	(Israel)	W	1974–1990	371	9
Meir Ben-Shitrit	(Israel)	FW	1975–1982	160	24
Ilan Luft	(Israel)	LB	1976–1982	111	3
Yaron Persalani	(Israel)	CB	1977–1987	215	19
Avraham Abukarat	(Israel)	HB	1977–1995	518	13
Eli Cohen	(Israel)	CB	1979–1986	231	11
Moshe Selecter	(Israel)	FW	1979–1990	247	72
Eitan Aharoni	(Israel)	RB	1979–1994	478	12
Ronny Rosenthal	(Israel)	FW	1980–1986	164	47
Rafi Osmo	(Israel)	FB	1980–1992	253	8
Avi Ran	(Israel)	GK	1981–1987	191	0
Zahi Armeli	(Israel)	FW	1982–1992	233	119
Zadok Malka	(Israel)	FW	1983–1989	152	24
Zion Merili	(Israel)	LB	1983–1990	222	8
Nir Klinger	(Israel)	RM	1984–1990	184	20
Lior Rosenthal	(Israel)	CB	1984–1992	167	2
Yaron Givol	(Israel)	LM	1985–1991	204	11
Offer Mizrahi	(Israel)	FW	1986–1993	196	13
Itai Mordechai	(Israel)	FW	1986–1993	187	61
Marco Balbul	(Israel)	CB	1986–2002	331	3
Reuven Atar	(Israel)	LM	1986–2002	375	102
Tal Banin	(Israel)	LM	1989–1992	121	24
Yaniv Cohen	(Israel)	CM	1990–1993	108	13
Viktor Chanov	(Soviet Union)	GK	1991–1993	106	0
Eyal Berkovic	(Israel)	CM	1990–1996	276	50
Alon Harazi	(Israel)	CB	1991–2009	717	42
Moshe Glam	(Israel)	LB	1991–1997	184	23
Arik Benado	(Israel)	CB	1991–2011	522	13
Alon Hazan	(Israel)	CB	1992–1996	160	24
Ronny Levy	(Israel)	HB	1992–1997	204	21
Rafi Cohen	(Israel)	GK	1993–1996	132	0
Haim Silvas	(Israel)	RM	1993–1997	115	11
Serhiy Kandaurov	(Ukraine)	HB	1993–1997	173	60
Haim Revivo	(Israel)	LM	1994–1996	78	65
Alon Mizrahi	(Israel)	FW	1995–1999	129	97
Avishai Jano	(Israel)	RB	1995–2004	358	25
Nir Davidovich	(Israel)	GK	1995–2013	460	0
Ofir Kopel	(Israel)	HB	1996–1999	110	1
Adoram Keisi	(Israel)	LB	1991–2007	402	28
Yossi Benayoun	(Israel)	RM	1998–2002, 2014–2016	210	70
Yaniv Katan	(Israel)	FW	1998–2005, 2006–2014	557	94
Serghei Cleşcenco	(Moldova)	FW	1999–2001	88	30
Yakubu	(Nigeria)	FW	1999–2003	73	39
Raimondas Žutautas	(Lithuania)	HB	1999–2003	125	7
Rafi Cohen	(Israel)	FW	1999–2003	153	56
Nenad Pralija	(Croatia)	CM	2000–2003	121	33
Walid Badir	(Israel)	HB	2000–2005	204	45
Đovani Roso	(Croatia)	RM	2001–2008	181	38
Michael Zandberg	(Israel)	LM	2002–2006	172	43
Idan Tal	(Israel)	LM	2003–2006	153	42
Dekel Keinan	(Israel)	CB	2003–2010, 2012–2017	321	21
Haim Megrelashvili	(Israel)	LB	2004–2007	106	2
Xavier Dirceu	(Brazil)	HB	2004–2007	135	6
Roberto Colautti	(Israel)	FW	2004–2007	137	62
Gustavo Boccoli	(Brazil)	MF	2004–2015	364	37
Shlomi Arbeitman	(Israel)	FW	2005–2010	150	38
Lior Rafaelov	(Israel)	LM	2005–2011, 2023–2025	294	58
Tomer Hemed	(Israel)	FW	2005–2011, 2024	91	27
Beram Kayal	(Israel)	CM	2006–2010	101	7
Eyal Meshumar	(Israel)	RB	2006–2017	287	11
Tsepo Masilela	(South Africa)	LB	2007–2011	88	2
Eyal Golasa	(Israel)	CM	2008–2014	121	13
Jhon Culma	(Colombia)	CM	2008–2011	98	1
Taleb Twatiha	(Israel)	LB	2009–2016, 2020–2022	208	7
Vladimir Dvalishvili	(Georgia (country))	CM	2009–2012	103	48
Idan Vered	(Israel)	MF	2010–2015	153	18
Alon Turgeman	(Israel)	FW	2011–2015	131	35
Weaam Amasha	(Israel)	FW	2011–2015	101	39
Hen Ezra	(Israel)	AM	2012–2016	136	30
Raz Meir	(Israel)	RB	2014–2023	147	3
Neta Lavi	(Israel)	CM	2015–2022	242	10
Sun Menahem	(Israel)	LB	2015–2024	213	11
Nikita Rukavytsya	(Australia)	FW	2016–2021, 2022–2023	209	75
Rami Gershon	(Israel)	CB	2017–2025	125	2
Ofri Arad	(Israel)	CB	2017–2023	142	6
Ernest Mabouka	(Cameroon)	RB	2017–2021	128	1
Mohammad Abu Fani	(Israel)	CM	2017–2023	147	17
Josh Cohen	(United States)	GK	2019–2023	161	0
Tjaronn Chery	(Suriname)	AM	2019–2024	214	56
Dolev Haziza	(Israel)	LM	2019–	212	34
Mahmoud Jaber	(Israel)	CM	2019–2025	124	4
Omer Atzili	(Israel)	RM	2021–2023	127	59
Dean David	(Israel)	FW	2021–2025	184	80
Ali Mohamed	(Niger)	CM	2021–	180	2
Sean Goldberg	(Israel)	CB	2021–	147	4
Frantzdy Pierrot	(Haiti)	FW	2022–2024	106	43
Pierre Cornud	(France)	LB	2022–2024, 2025–	94	1
Abdoulaye Seck	(Senegal)	CB	2022–	115	11

== Club First Captains ==
Dates	Name	Notes
1978–1979	(Israel) Oded Baloush	Had captain's armband taken away for getting into a dispute with management over wages
2000–2006	(Israel) Arik Benado	
2006–2014	(Israel) Yaniv Katan	
2014–2016	(Israel) Yossi Benayoun	
2016–2018	(Israel) Dekel Keinan	
2018–2022	(Israel) Neta Lavi	
2023–2024	(Suriname) Tjaronn Chery	
2024–2025	(Israel) Lior Refaelov	
2025–	(Israel) Dolev Haziza	

== Club Vice Captains ==
Dates	Name	Notes
2000–2009	(Israel) Alon Harazi	2nd Captain until retiring in December 2009.
2009–2013	(Israel) Nir Davidovich	2nd Captain until retiring in June 2013.
2013–2014	(Israel) (Brazil) Gustavo Boccoli	
2014–2016	(Israel) Dekel Keinan	
2016–2017	(Israel) Eyal Meshumar	
