= 1993–94 Maccabi Haifa F.C. season =

Maccabi Haifa
1993-94 season
- Chairman: (Israel) Ya'akov Shahar
- Manager: (Israel) Giora Spiegel
- Stadium: Kiryat Eliezer
- Liga leumit: Champion
- State Cup: 9th round
- Toto Cup: Winner
- Cup Winners' Cup: 2nd round
- Top goalscorer: League: Alon Mizrahi (28); All: Alon Mizrahi (34)
- Highest home attendance: 18,000 vs Maccabi Tel Aviv (April 2004)
Home colours	Away colours

The 1993-94 season was Maccabi Haifa's 33rd season in Israeli Premier League, and their 9th consecutive season in the top division of Israeli football.

After winning the State Cup in the previous season the team started the season with the Cup Winners' Cup, where they advanced to the second round (last 16) and managed to beat AC Parma – winners of the previous edition and eventual finalists – in Italy, before being eliminated on penalties. In domestic competitions, the club won the league championship after going undefeated for the entire season, qualifying to the Champions League for the next season. The club also won the Toto Cup.

As previous manager Shlomo Scharf was appointed as manager of the Israel national football team ahead of the 1994 World Cup qualification campaign, the club appointed Giora Spiegel as their new head coach.

== Cup Winners' Cup ==
Date	Opponents	H / A	Result F – A	Scorers	Attendance
17 August 1993	(Luxembourg) F91 Dudelange	A	1–0	Mizrahi 38';	15,000
1 September 1993	(Luxembourg) F91 Dudelange	H	6–1	A. Mizrahi (25', 52'), Kandaurov (35'), Atar (56'), R. Levi (75'), Harazi (78')	5,000
15 September 1993	(Russia) FC Torpedo Moscow	A	0–1		3,000
28 September 1993	(Russia) FC Torpedo Moscow	H	3–1	A. Mizrahi (6'), Pets (75'), Holtzman (85')	9,000
20 October 1993	(Italy) Parma F.C.	H	0–1		1,600
3 November 1993	(Italy) Parma F.C.	A	1–0	A. Mizrahi (51'),	10,000

== Liga Leumit ==
Date	Opponents	H / A	Result F – A	Scorers	Attendance
28 Aug 1993	Beitar Jerusalem	A	3 – 2	Atar 29', Mizrahi 34', 75'	7,000
4 Sep 1993	Maccabi Herzliya	H	1 – 0	R. Levy 42'	6,000
11 Sep 1993	Hapoel Haifa	A	0 – 0		3,000
18 Sep 1993	Tzafririm Holon	H	5 – 0	Mizrahi 21', 27', Atar 25', Eyal Berkovic 45', Holtzman 69'	6,000
2 Oct 1993	Hapoel Tel Aviv	A	1 – 0	Hazan 60'	6,000
16 Oct 1993	Maccabi Petah Tikva	H	4 – 0	Mizrahi 44', 49', Glam 82', Holtzman 84',	4,500
23 Oct 1993	Hapoel Petah Tikva	A	3 – 1	Mizrahi 2', 67', Holtzman 45'	6,000
30 Oct 1993	Hapoel Be'er Sheva	H	2 – 1	Atar 22', Kandaurov 34'	10,000
6 Nov 1993	Hapoel Kfar Saba	A	1 – 1	Mizrahi 57'	5,500
13 Nov 1993	Maccabi Ironi Ashdod	A	3 – 1	Kandaurov 10', Mizrahi 37', 77'	6,000
20 Nov 1993	Maccabi Netanya	H	4 – 2	Mizrahi 15', Kandaurov 24', Hazan 32', Eyal Berkovic 71',	7,000
27 Nov 1993	Maccabi Tel Aviv	A	1 – 1	Hazan 10'	43,000
4 Dec 1993	Bnei Yehuda Tel Aviv	H	5 – 1	Mizrahi 23', Atar 58', Kandaurov 78' Levi 87', Holtzman 89'	6,000
11 Dec 1993	Beitar Jerusalem	H	4 – 0	Levi 26', Mizrahi 55', 85', Glam 68'	14,000
18 Dec 1993	Maccabi Herzliya	A	2 – 0	Kandaurov 27', Atar 45'	3,000
25 Dec 1993	Hapoel Haifa	H	4 – 0	Levi 22', 71', Glam 47' Aharoni 86'	12,000
1 Jan 1994	Tzafririm Holon	A	0 – 0		3,000
8 Jan 1994	Hapoel Tel Aviv	H	2 – 1	Kandaurov 65', Mizrahi 87'	12,000
15 Jan 1994	Maccabi Petah Tikva	A	1 – 0	Mizrahi 64'	1,000
22 Jan 1994	Hapoel Petah Tikva	H	2 – 1	Mizrahi 50', Atar 79'	9,000
29 Jan 1994	Hapoel Be'er Sheva	A	2 – 0	Mizrahi 21', Kandaurov 51'	7,000
5 Dec 1994	Hapoel Kfar Saba	H	0 – 0		8,000
12 Dec 1994	Maccabi Ironi Ashdod	H	2 – 1	Hetsko 70', Mizrahi 88'	8,000
19 Dec 1994	Maccabi Netanya	A	2 – 2	Hetsko 67', Holtzman 84'	5,000
26 Dec 1994	Maccabi Tel Aviv	H	5 – 0	Berkovic 9', Mizrahi 22', Atar 31', Hetsko 75', Glam 83	20,000
5 Mar 1994	Bnei Yehuda Tel Aviv	A	3 – 0	Hetsko 35', 75', Mizrahi 27'	2,000
12 Mar 1994	Hapoel Haifa	H	6 – 1	Harazi 29', Berkovic 16', Hazan 31', Hazan 31' Mizrahi 45', Atar 54',	8,000
19 Mar 1994	Maccabi Tel Aviv	H	1 – 1	Hazan 48'	18,000
27 Mar 1994	Hapoel Be'er Sheva	H	2 – 2	Holtzman 78', Berkovic 83'	9,000
2 Apr 1994	Beitar Jerusalem	H	5 – 1	Mizrahi 13' 24', 46', Berkovic 38' Holtzman 66 '	12,000
8 Apr 1994	Tzafririm Holon	A	1 – 0	Holtzman 22'	2,000
16 Apr 1994	Maccabi Netanya	H	1 – 1	Glam 75'	5,000
23 Apr 1994	Hapoel Tel Aviv	A	3 – 2	Kandaurov 9', Hazan 13', Berkovic 87'	20,000
30 Apr 1994	Hapoel Petah Tikva	H	6 – 0	Kandaurov 31', Atar 42', Hetsko 49', 58' 66', Balbul 80'	12,000
7 May 1994	Maccabi Herzliya	A	3 – 1	Hazan 10', Kandaurov 80', Atar 82'	8,000
14 May 1994	Bnei Yehuda Tel Aviv	H	1 – 0	Mizrahi 44'	15,000
21 May 1994	Maccabi Petah Tikva	A	1 – 1	Berkovic 68'	10,000
28 May 1994	Maccabi Ironi Ashdod	H	1 – 1	Berkovic 16'	16,000
3 June 1994	Hapoel Kfar Saba	A	4 – 1	Soher 47' (O.G), Glam 64', Hazan 85', Holtzman 90'	7,000

Pos	Team	Pld	W	D	L	GF	GA	GD	Pts	Qualification or relegation
1	Maccabi Haifa (C)	39	28	11	0	97	27	+70	95	Qualification for the Champions League qualifying round
2	Maccabi Tel Aviv	39	27	7	5	80	36	+44	88	Qualification for the Cup Winners' Cup qualifying round (Note: Since Maccabi Tel Aviv won the Israeli State Cup, then the 3rd-positioned team awarded with entry to the 1994–1995 UEFA Cup.)
3	Hapoel Be'er Sheva	39	18	11	10	54	38	+16	65	Qualification for the UEFA Cup preliminary round
4	Beitar Jerusalem	39	19	7	13	75	66	+9	64	
5	Hapoel Tel Aviv	39	16	6	17	61	59	+2	54	

Source: rsssf.com
(C) Champions

== State Cup ==
Date	Opponents	H / A	Result F – A	Scorers	Attendance
9 Mar 1994	Maccabi Akko	A	3 – 0	Kandaurov 23', Mizrahi 74', Hetsko 85'	1,500
5 Apr 1994	Maccabi Tel Aviv	H	1 – 2	Kandaurov 15'	17,000

== Squad statistics ==
No.	Name	Europe				League				State Cup				Total			
No.	Name		Yellow card	Red card	Goals		Yellow card	Red card	Goals		Yellow card	Red card	Goals		Yellow card	Red card	Goals
1	(Israel) Rafi Cohen	6	1	0	0	39	1	0	0	2	0	0	0	47	2	0	0
2	(Israel) Eitan Aharoni	2	0	0	0	26	0	0	1	2	0	0	0	30	0	0	1
3	(Israel) Alon Harazi	5	0	0	1	38	1	0	1	2	0	0	0	45	1	0	2
4	(Israel) Alon Hazan	5	0	0	0	37	8	0	8	2	1	0	0	44	9	0	8
5	(Ukraine) Roman Pets	5	2	0	1	27	4	0	0	1	0	0	0	33	6	0	1
6	(Israel) Avraham Abukarat	1	0	0	0	0	0	0	0	0	0	0	0	1	0	0	0
7	(Israel) Ronny Levy	6	0	0	1	35	6	0	5	2	0	0	0	43	6	0	6
8	(Ukraine) Ivan Hetsko	3	1	0	0	22	3	0	8	2	0	0	1	27	4	0	9
9	(Israel) Eyal Berkovic	6	1	0	0	38	1	0	10	2	0	0	0	46	2	0	10
10	(Israel) Reuven Atar	5	2	0	1	37	2	0	8	1	0	0	0	43	4	0	9
11	(Israel) Alon Mizrahi	6	1	0	5	38	0	1	28	2	0	0	1	46	1	1	34
12	(Israel) Shay Holtzman	3	0	0	1	30	0	0	9	0	0	0	0	33	0	0	10
13	(Israel) Marco Balbul	4	1	0	0	28	8	1	1	1	0	0	0	33	9	1	1
14	(Israel) Moshe Glam	6	1	0	0	36	3	0	6	2	0	1	0	0	0	1	0
15	(Israel) Arik Benado	3	1	0	0	20	0	6	0	2	0	0	0	25	7	0	0
16	(Ukraine) Serhiy Kandaurov	6	1	0	1	35	4	0	10	2	1	0	2	43	6	0	13
	(Israel) Golan Derei	0	0	0	0	2	0	0	0	0	0	0	0	2	0	0	0
	(Israel) Tzabar Daneil	1	0	0	0	11	0	0	0	1	0	0	0	13	0	0	0
-	Total	6	12	0	11	39	42	2	95	2	2	1	4	47	56	3	107

== See also ==
- List of unbeaten football club seasons
