= Football records and statistics in Israel =

This page details football records in Israel.

== National team ==
See Israel national football team records.

== League ==
Records in this section refer to Palestine League from its founding in 1931 to 1947, Israeli League from 1949 to 1950, Liga Alef from 1951 to 1955, Liga Leumit from 1955 to 1999 and to the Premier League since the 1999 season.

=== Titles ===
- Most League titles: 26, Maccabi Tel Aviv (1936, 1937, 1939, 1941–42, 1946–47, 1949–50, 1951–52, 1953–54, 1955–56, 1957–58, 1966–68, 1969–70, 1971–72, 1976–77, 1978–79, 1991–92, 1994–95, 1995–96, 2002–03, 2012–13, 2013–14, 2014–15, 2018–19, 2019–20, 2023–24, 2024–25)
- Most consecutive League titles: 5, Hapoel Petah Tikva (1958–59, 1959–60, 1960–61, 1961–62, 1962–63)
- Most domestic titles in a single season: 3, Maccabi Tel Aviv (2014–15)

=== Top-flight Appearances ===
- Most appearances: 70 seasons, Maccabi Tel Aviv (1949–present)
- Most consecutive seasons in top-flight: 70 seasons, Maccabi Tel Aviv (1949–present)

=== Unbeaten runs ===
- Longest unbeaten League run: 48, Maccabi Haifa (Liga Leumit, between 3 April 1993 and 10 October 1994)

=== Points ===
- Most points in a season:
  - 2 points for a win: 47, Maccabi Netanya (Liga Leumit, 1970–71)
  - 3 points for a win: 95, Maccabi Haifa (Liga Leumit, 1993–94)
- Fewest points in a season
  - 2 points for a win: 0, Maccabi Nes Tziona (Israeli League, 1949–50)
  - 3 points for a win: 10, joint record:
    - Beitar Netanya (Liga Leumit, 1986–87)
    - Maccabi Jaffa (Liga Leumit, 1998–99)

=== Team ===
- Most top-flight goals scored in a season: 103, Maccabi Tel Aviv (Israeli League, 1949–50)

=== Promotion and change in position ===
- Highest finish by a promoted club: 1st, joint record:
  - Hapoel Ramat Gan (Liga Leumit, 1963–64)
  - Beitar Jerusalem (Liga Leumit, 1992–93)
- Lowest finish by the previous season's champions: 16th out of 16 (relegated), Hapoel Kfar Saba (Liga Leumit, 1982–83)

=== Goals ===
==== Individual ====
- Most career league goals: 207, Alon Mizrahi (1989 to 2005)
- Most goals in a season: 35, Eran Zahavi (36 matches, for Maccabi Tel Aviv in the (2015–16 Premier League)
- Fastest goal: 6 seconds, Ilan Bakhar (for Maccabi Herzliya v. Hapoel Be'er Sheva, 1997–98 Liga Leumit)

== Premier League – Since 1999–2000 season ==
=== Titles ===
- Most titles: 10, Maccabi Haifa
- Most consecutive title wins: 3, joint record:
  - Maccabi Haifa (2003–04, 2004–05, 2005–06 and 2020–21, 2021–22, 2022–23)
  - Maccabi Tel Aviv (2012–13, 2013–14, 2014–15)
  - Hapoel Be'er Sheva (2015–16, 2016–17, 2017–18)

=== Wins ===
- Most wins in a season: 27, 3, joint record:
  - Maccabi Tel Aviv (2018–19), Maccabi Haifa (2022–23)
- Fewest wins in a season: 3, join record:
  - Hapoel Petah Tikva (2006–07)
  - Hapoel Ramat Gan (2010–11)
- Most Premier League wins: 395, Maccabi Haifa (1999–present)

=== Draws ===
- Most draws in a season: 18, Hapoel Haifa (1999–2000)
- Fewest draws in a season: 3, Maccabi Tel Aviv (2002–03)
- Most Premier League draws: 16, Beitar Jerusalem (1999–present)

=== Losses ===
- Most losses in a season: 30, Tzafririm Holon (2000–01)
- Fewest losses in a season: 1, joint record:
  - Hapoel Tel Aviv (2009–10)
  - Maccabi Tel Aviv (2018–19, 2019–20)
- Most Premier League losses: 235, F.C. Ashdod (1999–2014, 2015–present)

=== Premier League Appearances ===
- Most appearances: 20 seasons, joint record:
  - Beitar Jerusalem (1999–present)
  - Maccabi Haifa (1999–present)
  - Maccabi Tel Aviv (1999–present)
- Most consecutive seasons in the Premier League: 20 seasons, joint record:
  - Beitar Jerusalem (1999–present)
  - Maccabi Haifa (1999–present)
  - Maccabi Tel Aviv (1999–present)

=== Points ===
- Most points in a season:
  - 3 points for a win: 89, Maccabi Tel Aviv (2018–19)
- Fewest points in a season
  - 3 points for a win: 12, Maccabi Netanya (2015–16)

=== Promotion and change in position ===
- Highest finish by a promoted club: 3rd, Ironi Kiryat Shmona (2007–08)
- Best position for promoted clubs: 3rd and 4th, Ironi Kiryat Shmona and Bnei Sakhnin (2007–08)

=== Goals ===
- Most goals scored in a season: 87, Hapoel Tel Aviv (2009–10)
- Most Premier League goals: 1050, Maccabi Haifa (1999–present)
- Fewest goals scored in a season: 14, Maccabi Netanya (2015–16)
- Most goals conceded in a season: 85, Tzafririm Holon (2000–01)
- Most Premier League goals conceded: 808, F.C. Ashdod (1999–2014, 2015–present)
- Fewest goals conceded in a season: 10, Maccabi Tel Aviv (2019–20)
- Best points average in the Premier League: 64.94, Maccabi Haifa (1999–present)
- Best goal difference in the Premier League: +469, Maccabi Haifa (1999–present)
- Worst goal difference in the Premier League: –130p, Hapoel Petah Tikva (1999–2007, 2008–2012, 2013–2014)

==== Individual ====
- Most Israeli Premier League goals: 128, Shay Holtzman (1999 to 2009)
- Most goals in a season: 35, Eran Zahavi (36 matches), for Maccabi Tel Aviv, (2015-16)

== State Cup ==
- Most wins: 24, Maccabi Tel Aviv (1929, 1930, 1933, 1941, 1946, 1947, 1954, 1955, 1958, 1959, 1964, 1965, 1967, 1970, 1977, 1987, 1988, 1994, 1996, 2001, 2002, 2005, 2015, 2021)
- Most consecutive wins: 3, Hapoel Tel Aviv (1937, 1938, 1939; 2010, 2011, 2012)
- Most appearances: 36, Maccabi Tel Aviv (1929, 1930, 1933, 1934, 1938, 1940, 1941, 1946, 1947, 1952, 1954, 1955, 1958, 1959, 1962, 1964, 1965, 1967, 1970, 1976, 1977, 1979, 1983, 1987, 1988, 1992, 1993, 1994, 1996, 1997, 2001, 2002, 2005, 2015, 2016, 2017)
- Biggest win: Beitar Tel Aviv 12–1 Maccabi Haifa (1942)
- Most goals in a final: 13, Beitar Tel Aviv 12–1 Maccabi Haifa (1942)
- Most goals by a losing side: 3 –
  - Hapoel Petah Tikva: Lost 3–4 against Maccabi Tel Aviv (1959)
  - Maccabi Haifa scored 3 times (3–3) but lost on a penalty shootout vs Maccabi Tel Aviv (1987)
  - Maccabi Haifa scored 3 times (3–3) but lost on a penalty shootout vs Beitar Jerusalem (1989)
- Most defeats in a final: 13, Maccabi Tel Aviv (1934, 1938, 1940, 1952, 1962, 1976, 1979, 1983, 1992, 1993, 1997, 2016, 2017)

== Toto Cup ==
- Most wins: 9, Maccabi Tel Aviv (1993, 1999, 2009, 2015, 2018, 2019, 2020, 2023, 2024)
- Most consecutive wins: 2, joint record:
  - Shimshon Tel Aviv (1987, 1988)
  - Hapoel Petah Tikva (1990, 1991)
  - Ironi Kiryat Shmona (2011, 2012)
  - Maccabi Tel Aviv (2018, 2019 and 2023, 2024)

== Most successful clubs overall ==
As of 16 July 2026

Team	Domestic					Continental	Total
Team	Israeli Championships	Israel State Cup	Toto Cup (Top division only)	Israel Super Cup	Total	AFC Champions League Elite	Total
Maccabi Tel Aviv	**26**	**25**	**9**	**8**	**68**	**2**	**70**
Hapoel Tel Aviv	13	16	1	5	35	1	36
Maccabi Haifa	15	6	5	5	31	–	31
Beitar Jerusalem	6	8	4	2	20	–	20
Hapoel Be'er Sheva	6	4	3	5	18	–	18
Hapoel Petah Tikva	6	2	4	1	13	–	13
Maccabi Netanya	5	1	1	5	12	–	12
Bnei Yehuda	1	4	2	1	8	–	8
Hapoel Haifa	1	4	2	1	8	–	8
Maccabi Petah Tikva	–	3	4	–	7	–	7
Hakoah Maccabi Amidar Ramat Gan	2	2	–	1	5	–	5
Hapoel Kfar Saba	1	3	–	1	5	–	5
Ironi Kiryat Shmona	1	1	2	1	5	–	5
Beitar Tel Aviv	1	2	–	–	3	–	3
Hapoel Ramat Gan Givatayim	1	2	–	–	3	–	3
British Police	1	1	–	–	2	–	2
Hapoel Lod Beni Regev	–	1	–	1	2	–	2
Shimshon Tel Aviv	–	–	2	–	2	–	2
Bnei Sakhnin	–	1	–	–	1	–	1
Gunners	–	1	–	–	1	–	1
Hapoel Jerusalem	–	1	–	–	1	–	1
Hapoel Yehud	–	1	–	–	1	–	1
Maccabi Jerusalem	–	1	–	–	1	–	1
Maccabi Herzliya	–	–	1	–	1	–	1
Maccabi "Zvi" Yavne	–	–	1	–	1	–	1

- **The figures in bold represent the most times this competition has been won by an Israeli team.**
- The teams in italic represent a defunct team.

== Managers ==
- Most League title wins: Dror Kashtan, 6 (Hapoel Kfar Saba, Beitar Jerusalem, Maccabi Tel Aviv, Hapoel Tel Aviv)
- Most State Cup wins: Dror Kashtan, 6 (Hapoel Lod, Beitar Jerusalem, Maccabi Tel Aviv, Hapoel Tel Aviv)
- Most Toto Cup wins: Avram Grant, 5 (Hapoel Petah Tikva, Maccabi Tel Aviv, Maccabi Haifa)
- Most Asian Champion Club Tournament wins: Yosef Merimovich, 2 (Hapoel Tel Aviv, Maccabi Tel Aviv)
- Most domestic trophies in a single season: Pako Ayestarán, 3 (Maccabi Tel Aviv)

== Player records ==
=== Top scorers ===
As of matches played 13 May 2025

Rank	Nat	Name	Club	Years	Goals	Apps	Ratio
1	(Israel)	Alon Mizrahi	Bnei Yehuda, Hapoel Tel Aviv, Maccabi Haifa, Maccabi Tel Aviv, Ironi Ashdod, Beitar Jerusalem, Hapoel Kfar Saba, Ahi Nazareth, Hapoel Be'er Sheva	1989–2005	206	404	0.51
2	(Israel)	Oded Machnes	Maccabi Netanya, Maccabi Petah Tikva, Maccabi Tel Aviv	1974–1990	196	385	0.51
3	(Israel)	Avi Nimni	Maccabi Tel Aviv, Beitar Jerusalem	1989–2008	194	429	0.45
4	(Israel)	Moshe Romano	Shimshon Tel Aviv, Beitar Tel Aviv	1965–1982	192	402	0.48
5	(Israel)	Eran Zahavi	Maccabi Tel Aviv, Hapoel Tel Aviv	2006–2025	177	311	0.57
6	(Israel)	Shay Holtzman	Maccabi Netanya, Maccabi Haifa, Tzafririm Holon, Hapoel Be'er Sheva, Beitar Jerusalem, Hapoel Haifa, Maccabi Petah Tikva, Hapoel Rishon LeZion, F.C. Ashdod	1990–2009	169	474	0.36
7	(Israel)	Mordechai Spiegler	Maccabi Netanya, Hapoel Haifa	1963–1981	168	362	0.46
8	(Israel)	Uri Malmilian	Beitar Jerusalem, Maccabi Tel Aviv, Hapoel Be'er Sheva, Hapoel Kfar Saba	1973–1993	159	480	0.33
9	(Israel)	David Lavi	Maccabi Netanya, Beitar Tel Aviv	1973–1988	158	360	0.44
10	(Israel)	Nahum Stelmach	Hapoel Petah Tikva, Bnei Yehuda	1952–1970	155	367	0.42

=== Most appearances ===
Rank	Nat	Name	Years	Apps	Goals
1	(Israel)	Arik Benado	1991–2011	573	12
2	(Israel)	Rafi Cohen	1988–2010	546	0
3	(Israel)	Walid Badir	1992–2013	531	71
4	(Israel)	Alon Harazi	1990–2009	526	34
5	(Israel)	Gidi Damti	1968–1989	519	143
6	(Israel)	Liran Strauber	1992–2012	513	0
7	(Israel)	Shlomo Iluz	1978–1996	509	0
8	(Israel)	Menachem Bello	1964–1982	498	1
9	(Israel)	Yigal Antebi	1993–2014	494	14
10	(Israel)	Alon Hazan	1984–2004	483	66

== See also ==
- List of football clubs by competitive honours won
