= Farkash =

Farkash (Hebrew: פרקש, Hungarian: Farkas) is a Hungarian surname, meaning wolf. Notable people with the surname include:

- Aharon Ze'evi-Farkash (born 1948), Israeli general
- Amit Farkash (born 1989), Canadian-born Israeli actress and singer
- David Farkash, Israeli footballer
- Lynette Farkash, New Zealand gymnast
- Orit Farkash-Hacohen, Israeli lawyer and politician
- Safia Farkash (born 1952), widow of the former Libyan leader Muammar Gaddafi
- Ya'akov Farkash (1923–2002), Israeli caricaturist and illustrator
- Yekutiel Farkash, Chabad Hasidic rabbi, author, and teacher

== See also ==
- Farkash Gallery, holds the largest collection in the world of vintage Israeli posters.
