= Shlomo Benado =

Israeli footballer

Shlomo Benado שלמה בנאדו
Personal information
- Date of birth: c. January 1950
- Place of birth: Haifa, Israel
- Position: Midfielder

Youth career
- Maccabi Haifa

Senior career*
Years	Team	Apps	(Gls)
1970–1976	Maccabi Haifa	92	(6)
1971–1972	→ Maccabi Hadera (loan)		
1976–1989	Hapoel Tel Hanan		
- * Club domestic league appearances and goals

Shlomo Benado (Hebrew: שלמה בנאדו; born c. January 1950) is an Israeli former footballer who played as a midfielder for Maccabi Haifa.

He is the father of Arik Benado, a former player who now works as the manager of Maccabi Haifa.
