= 1997–98 Israel State Cup =

Tournament details
- Country: Israel

Final positions
- Champions: Maccabi Haifa (5th Title)
- Runners-up: Hapoel Jerusalem

The 1997–98 Israel State Cup (Hebrew: גביע המדינה, Gvia HaMedina) was the 59th season of Israel's nationwide football cup competition and the 44th after the Israeli Declaration of Independence.

The competition was won by Maccabi Haifa who had beaten Hapoel Jerusalem 2–0 in the final.

By winning, Maccabi Haifa qualified to the 1998–99 UEFA Cup Winners' Cup, entering in the qualifying round.

== Results ==
=== Eighth Round ===
Home team	Score	Away team
Bnei Sakhnin	0–5	Hapoel Be'er Sheva
Maccabi Tel Aviv	5–0	Hapoel Ramat Gan
Beitar Jerusalem	3–1	Hapoel Kiryat Ono
Hapoel Mahane Yehuda	0–7	Hapoel Haifa
Maccabi Haifa	5–0	Maccabi Netanya
Beitar Tel Aviv	0–1	Hapoel Petah Tikva
Maccabi Petah Tikva	1–0	Maccabi Kafr Kanna
Hapoel Tel Aviv	4–1	Maccabi Jaffa
Hapoel Tzafririm Holon	3–0	Maccabi Herzliya
Hapoel Lod	0–3	Hapoel Kfar Saba
Beitar Kfar Saba	0–2	Hapoel Beit She'an
Maccabi Yavne	0–5	Ironi Rishon LeZion
Hapoel Jerusalem	4–1	Maccabi Kiryat Gat
Bnei Yehuda	4–2	Hapoel Hadera
Maccabi Ironi Ashdod	5–2	Hapoel Bat Yam
Maccabi Ahi Nazareth	2–1	Hapoel Ashkelon

=== Round of 16 ===
Home team	Score	Away team
Hapoel Tel Aviv	2–1	Bnei Yehuda
Hapoel Beit She'an	1–2	Beitar Jerusalem
Ironi Rishon LeZion	1–0	Maccabi Petah Tikva
Hapoel Haifa	3–4 (a.e.t.)	Hapoel Be'er Sheva
Hapoel Petah Tikva	3–0	Hapoel Kfar Saba
Hapoel Jerusalem	5–3	Maccabi Ahi Nazareth
Maccabi Ironi Ashdod	4–3	Maccabi Tel Aviv
Maccabi Haifa	2–0 (a.e.t.)	Hapoel Tzafririm Holon

=== Quarter-finals ===
Home team	Score	Away team
Hapoel Petah Tikva	0–2	Maccabi Ironi Ashdod
Maccabi Haifa	4–2 (a.e.t.)	Ironi Rishon LeZion
Hapoel Tel Aviv	3–3 (a.e.t.) 6–7 p.	Hapoel Jerusalem
Hapoel Be'er Sheva	2–1 (a.e.t.)	Beitar Jerusalem

=== Semi-finals ===
Home team	Score	Away team
Hapoel Jerusalem	2–1	Hapoel Be'er Sheva
Maccabi Haifa	5–0	Maccabi Ironi Ashdod

=== Final ===
12 May 1998

Maccabi Haifa	2–0 (a.e.t.)	Hapoel Jerusalem
Balanchuk 110'; Mizrahi 112'

Ramat Gan Stadium
Attendance: 35000
Referee: Lefkovich
