= Adoram Keisi =

Israeli footballer

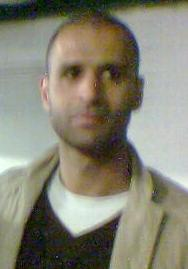
- Keisi in 2006

Personal information
- Date of birth: June 17, 1972 (age 54)
- Place of birth: Petah Tikva, Israel
- Height: 1.87 m (6 ft 1 1/2 in)
- Position: Left back

Youth career
- Hapoel Petah Tikva

Senior career*
Years	Team	Apps	(Gls)
1990–1996	Hapoel Petah Tikva	107	(7)
1990–1992	→ Shimshon Tel Aviv		
1996–2008	Maccabi Haifa	286	(32)
2004–2005	Hapoel Petah Tikva	32	(4)

International career
1992–1993	Israel U21	14	(1)
1994–2006	Israel	55	(4)
- * Club domestic league appearances and goals

Adoram Keisi (Hebrew: אדורם קייסי; born June 17, 1972) is a retired Israeli professional association footballer. He played most of his career as a left back in Maccabi Haifa F.C. in which he won 4 championships, one state cup and 2 Toto cups. Keisi is known as an excellent header and as a winner who scores crucial goals when needed (such as the equalizer to Hapoel Tel Aviv on 2001 or the goal vs Sturm Graz which secure Haifa's appearance in the group stage of the champions league).

== Early life ==
Keisi was born in Petah Tikva, Israel, to a family of Jewish background.

== Career ==
He joined his current club Maccabi Haifa from Hapoel Petah Tikva in 1995. After suffering a serious leg injury he recovered to become one of the best left backs in Israel. He has 51 caps and 4 goals for the national team and appeared for Maccabi Haifa in the UEFA Champions League group stage. Keisi is an excellent header who often comes forward and has scored many goals while assisting many from the wing.

In 2004, financial differences with the club's management led him to leave for his former club. However, in 2005 he returned to Haifa where he has won three league championships and a State Cup title. In 2007, he retired after he was suspended from the squad by the manager Roni Levi. After Levi left the club, Keisi was appointed as squad director, and assistant to the manager Elisha Levi.
