= Rami Glam =

Israeli footballer

Personal information
- Full name: Rahamim Glam
- Date of birth: September 23, 1978 (age 48)
- Place of birth: Netanya, Israel
- Position: Defender

Youth career
- –1994: Beitar Netanya
- 1994–1995: Maccabi Netanya

Senior career*
Years	Team	Apps	(Gls)
1995–1999	Maccabi Netanya		
1998	Hapoel Kfar Saba (loan)		
1999–2000	Hapoel Ironi Rishon LeZion	18	(0)
2000–2001	Hapoel Beit She'an		
2001–2002	Beitar Shimshon Tel Aviv F.C.		
2002–2003	Hakoah Ramat Gan		
2003–2007	Hapoel Ramat Gan		
- * Club domestic league appearances and goals

Rami Glam (Hebrew: רמי גלם; born September 23, 1978) is a former Israeli footballer.

Rami's older brother is Moshe Glam.

== Honours ==
- Israeli Youth Championship (1):
  - 1994-95
- Second Division (1):
  - 1998-99
- Third Division (1):
  - 2006-07
