= Moshe Glam =

Israeli footballer and manager

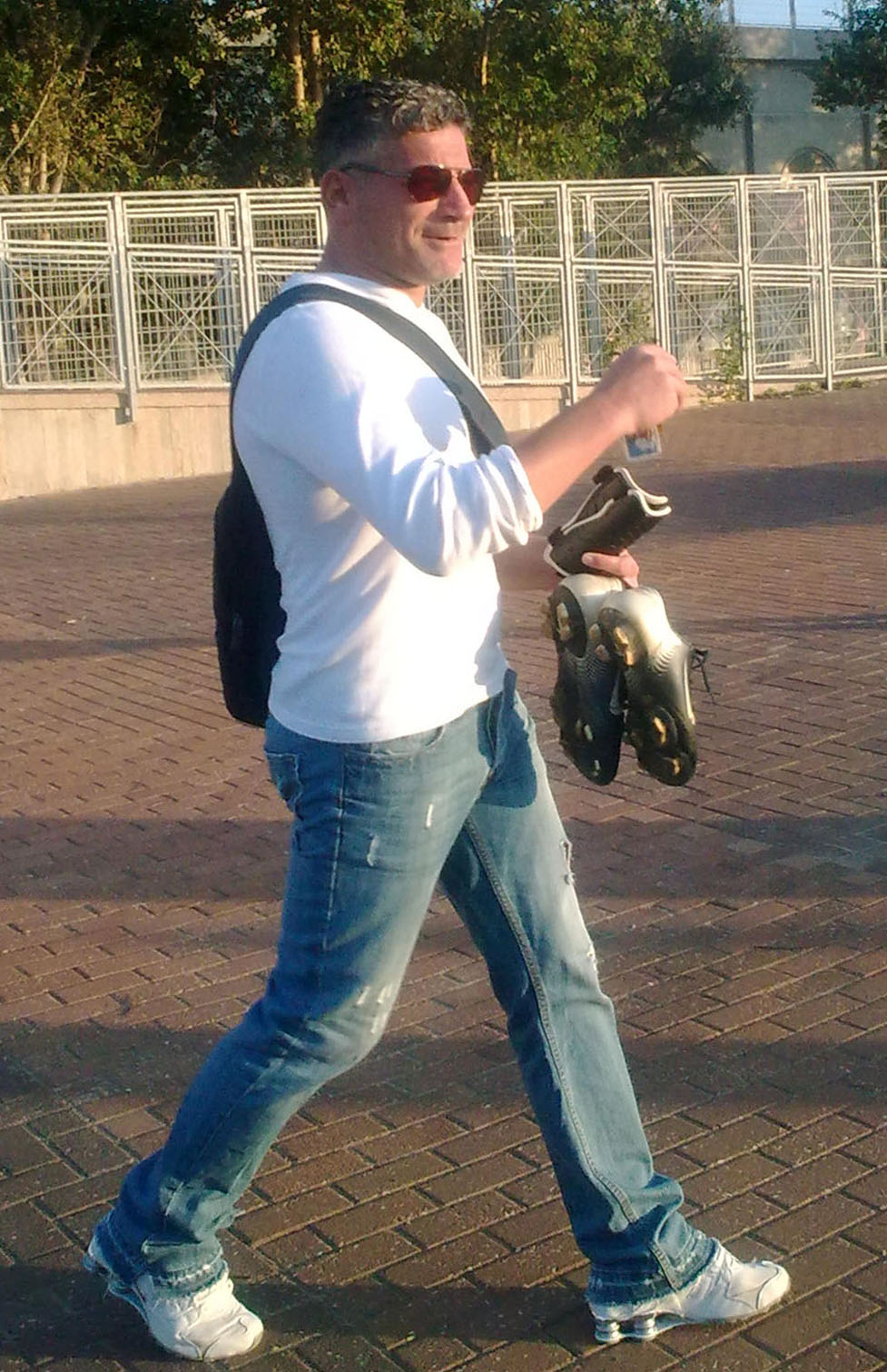

Personal information
- Full name: Moshe Glam
- Date of birth: November 28, 1968 (age 57)
- Place of birth: Netanya, Israel
- Height: 1.80 m (5 ft 11 in)
- Position: Midfielder

Youth career
- 1983–1988: Beitar Netanya

Senior career*
Years	Team	Apps	(Gls)
1987–1992	Beitar Netanya	124	(39)
1992–1993	Maccabi Netanya	28	(14)
1993–1997	Maccabi Haifa	131	(16)
1997–1999	Maccabi Tel Aviv	48	(7)
1999–2000	Maccabi Netanya	25	(2)
2000–2001	F.C. Ashdod	38	(3)
2001–2002	Maccabi Netanya	21	(2)
2002–2003	Maccabi Ramat Amidar		
2003–2004	Maccabi Ahi Nazareth	27	(2)
2006–2008	Maccabi Ironi Kfar Yona	50	(20)
2009–2011	Maccabi HaSharon Netanya	21	(6)

International career
1993–1997	Israel	30	(2)

Managerial career
- 2007–2009: Maccabi Ironi Kfar Yona
- 2010: Maccabi Ironi Kfar Yona
- 2012–2013: ASA Tel Aviv University
- 2013–2014: Maccabi Emeq Hefer
- * Club domestic league appearances and goals

Moshe Glam (Hebrew: משה גלאם; born 28 November 1968) is an Israeli footballer and a football manager.

With five seasons in Beitar Netanya, three seasons in Maccabi Netanya and one season in Maccabi HaSharon Netanya Glam made history as the only player to take part in all of the senior sides from the city of Netanya.

== Honours ==
- Israeli Premier League: 1993–94
- Toto Cup: 1993–94, 1998–99
- Israel State Cup: 1995

== Personal life ==
Glam's younger brother is Rami Glam.
