= Baruch Maman =

Israeli footballer

Baruch Maman ברוך ממן
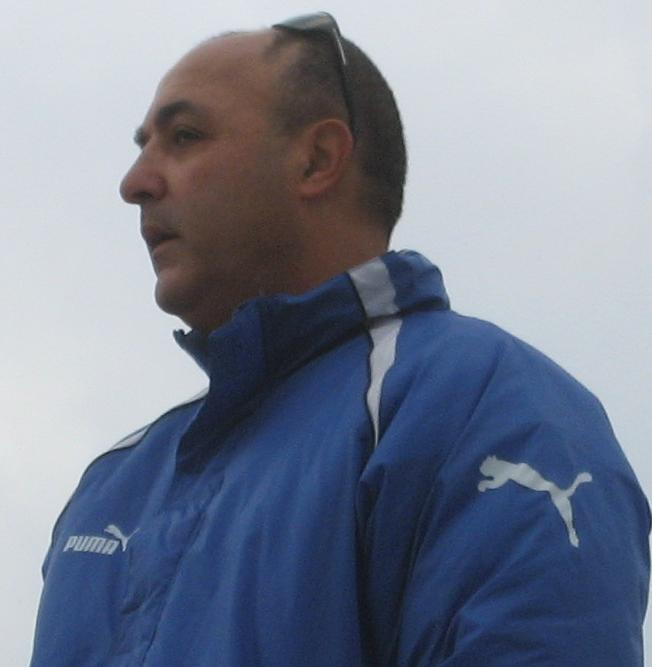

Personal information
- Full name: Baruch Maman
- Date of birth: November 23, 1955 (age 70)
- Place of birth: Safed, Israel
- Position: Attacking midfielder

Youth career
- Maccabi Haifa

Senior career*
Years	Team	Apps	(Gls)
1973–1987	Maccabi Haifa	303	(45)
1987–1988	Bnei Yehuda		
1988–1989	Hapoel Tiberias		

International career
	Israel	3	(0)

Managerial career
- 2004: Hapoel Haifa
- 2012–2013: Ironi Kiryat Ata
- 2014: Hapoel Asi Gilboa
- * Club domestic league appearances and goals

Baruch Maman (Hebrew: ברוך ממן; born 1955) is an Israeli former footballer. He is considered one of the best players to emerge from the ranks of the youth team of Maccabi Haifa.

== Biography ==
He was born in Safed to a Tunisian-Jewish family, they moved to Haifa when he was three.

== Sports career ==
Joining the youth ranks at Maccabi Haifa at the age of 14, he enjoyed reasonable success on the Under-21 side scoring 12 goals in six matches. Before his draft into the Israel Defense Forces, he played his first team match against Hapoel Tel Aviv.

He played for the Israeli Air Force football team in an IDF tournament.

In 1982, Jack Mansell arrived to coach Maccabi Haifa. Despite his efforts to replace Maman out, Yochanan Vollach fought on his behalf and Maman went on to become a starring member of the team, helping Maccabi Haifa win its first championship in 1984 and retaining this title in 1985.
