= Xavier Dirceu =

Brazilian former footballer

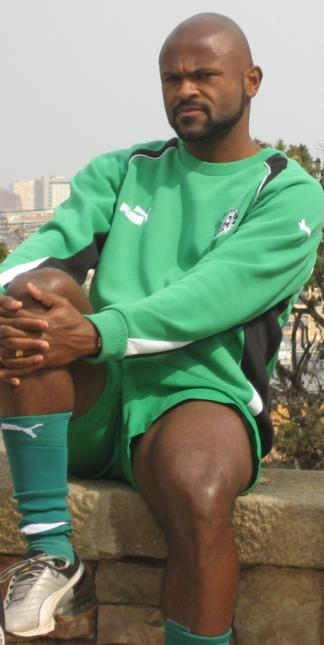

Personal information
- Full name: Dirceu Francisco Xavier
- Date of birth: December 18, 1977 (age 48)
- Place of birth: Cabo Frio, Brazil
- Height: 1.77 m (5 ft 9 1/2 in)
- Position: Defensive midfielder

Team information
- Current team: São Bernardo

Youth career
- Fluminense

Senior career*
Years	Team	Apps	(Gls)
1996–1997	Fluminense		
1998–1999	Guarani		
2000	Maia		
2000	Fluminense		
2001–2003	Juventus		
2004	Santo André		
2004–2007	Maccabi Haifa	91	(3)
2007–2008	→ Maccabi Petah Tikva (loan)	1	(0)
2009	Santo André	9	(0)
2009–2011	São Bernardo		
- * Club domestic league appearances and goals as of 11:45, 24 October 2009 (UTC)

Dirceu Francisco Xavier (born December 18, 1977, in Cabo Frio), nicknamed Xavier Dirceu or just Xavier, and sometimes misspelled Xavier Dirção, is a Brazilian football former player who last played for São Bernardo, but also had significant international stints at Juventus and Maccabi Haifa.

== Playing career ==
He helped Maccabi Haifa to its tenth championship in 2005. Dirceu joined the club as an unknown (from Santo André of Brazil), but quickly became the top defensive midfielder in the Israeli Premier League.

In August 2007, he left Maccabi Haifa and signed for 3 years in Maccabi Petah Tikva, but he left the club after one season and returned to Brazil.
