= Eitan Aharoni =

Israeli footballer (born 1962)

Eitan Aharoni איתן אהרוני
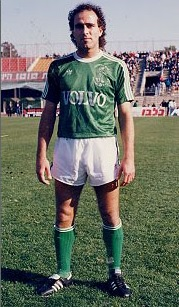

Personal information
- Date of birth: 21 December 1962 (age 63)
- Place of birth: Tzrufa, Israel
- Position: Defender

Youth career
- Maccabi Haifa

Senior career*
Years	Team	Apps	(Gls)
1979–1994	Maccabi Haifa	368	(7)
1989–1990	→ Hapoel Kfar Saba (loan)	26	(1)
1994–1995	Hapoel Haifa	28	(3)
Total		422	(11)

International career
1986–1992	Israel	16	(1)
- * Club domestic league appearances and goals

Eitan Aharoni (Hebrew: איתן אהרוני; born 21 December 1962) is an Israeli former footballer who played as a defender.

== Personal life ==
Eitan's son Yohai is also a footballer as is his nephew, Eden Ben Basat.

== Honours ==
Maccabi Haifa

- Israeli Premier League: 1983–84, 1984–85, 1988–89, 1990–91, 1993–94; runner-up: 1985–86
- State Cup: 1990–91, 1992–93; runner-up 1984–85, 1986–87, 1988–89
- Toto Cup: 1993–94
