= Zadok Malka =

Israeli footballer

Zadok Malka צדוק מלכה
Personal information
- Full name: Zadok Malka
- Date of birth: August 26, 1964 (age 62)
- Place of birth: Haifa, Israel
- Height: 6 ft 0 in (1.83 m)
- Positions: Attacking midfielder; striker

Youth career
- Maccabi Haifa

Senior career*
Years	Team	Apps	(Gls)
1983–1986	Maccabi Haifa	47	(10)
1986	Maccabi Jaffa	9	(1)
1983–1990	Maccabi Haifa	38	(3)
1990–1992	Maccabi Holon		

Managerial career
- 2004–2006: Maccabi Haifa (youth)
- 2006: Maccabi Herzliya (assistant)
- 2007–2008: Maccabi Netanya (assistant)
- 2008–2009: Beitar Jerusalem (assistant)
- 2009–2012: Maccabi Netanya (assistant)
- 2012–2013: Maccabi Haifa (assistant)
- 2014–2015: F.C. Nesher (youth)
- * Club domestic league appearances and goals

Zadok Malka (Hebrew: צדוק מלכה) is a former Israeli footballer.

== Honours ==
- Israeli Championships
  - 1984–85, 1988–89, 1990–91
