= Oded Baloush =

Israeli footballer

Oded Baloush עודד בלוש
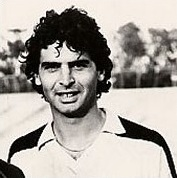

Personal information
- Full name: Oded Baloush.
- Date of birth: 28 September 1957 (age 69)
- Place of birth: Haifa, Israel
- Position: Midfielder

Youth career
- Maccabi Haifa

Senior career*
Years	Team	Apps	(Gls)
1973–1980	Maccabi Haifa	117	(15)
1980	San Diego Sockers		
1981	Maccabi Netanya		
1981–1984	Hapoel Kisra-Sumei		
1984–1986	Hapoel Haifa		
- * Club domestic league appearances and goals

Oded Baloush (Hebrew: עודד בלוש) is an Israeli former professional association footballer who played for Maccabi Haifa and the San Diego Sockers.

== Playing career ==
Baloush made his league debut in a match against Bnei Yehuda on 29 December 1973.
