= David Farkash =

Israeli footballer and manager

David Farkash דוד פרקש
Personal information
- Place of birth: Czechoslovakia
- Position: Striker

Senior career*
Years	Team	Apps	(Gls)
1950–1951	Maccabi Haifa	14	
- * Club domestic league appearances and goals

David Farkash (Hebrew: דוד פרקש) is an Israeli former football player and coach who played for and coached Maccabi Haifa. He and his brother Emil survived the Holocaust along with their parents.
