= Ya'akov Shahar =

Israeli businessman

- יעקב שחר
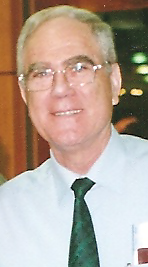
- Born: 8 April 1941 (age 85); Ness Ziona, Mandatory Palestine
- Occupations: Chairman, Mayer's Cars and Trucks Ltd. Chairman, Maccabi Haifa Football Club
- Spouse: Nili Shahar
- Children: Or, Rom and Omer Shahar

Ya'akov "Yankal'e" Shahar (Hebrew: יעקב "יענקל'ה" שחר; born 1941) is an Israeli businessman best known for his ownership of Maccabi Haifa F.C.

He is the main owner of Maccabi Haifa F.C., the main shareholder of Mayer's Cars & Trucks, an importer of Volvo and Honda cars, valued at 4 billion NIS.

== Awards and recognition ==
- In October 19, 2017, he was awarded the Lifetime Achievement Award by the Israeli Football League Management in a ceremony attended by the president of Israel, Reuven Rivlin.
- In March 2022, a street in Haifa was inaugurated in his name.
