= Alon Mizrahi =

Israeli footballer

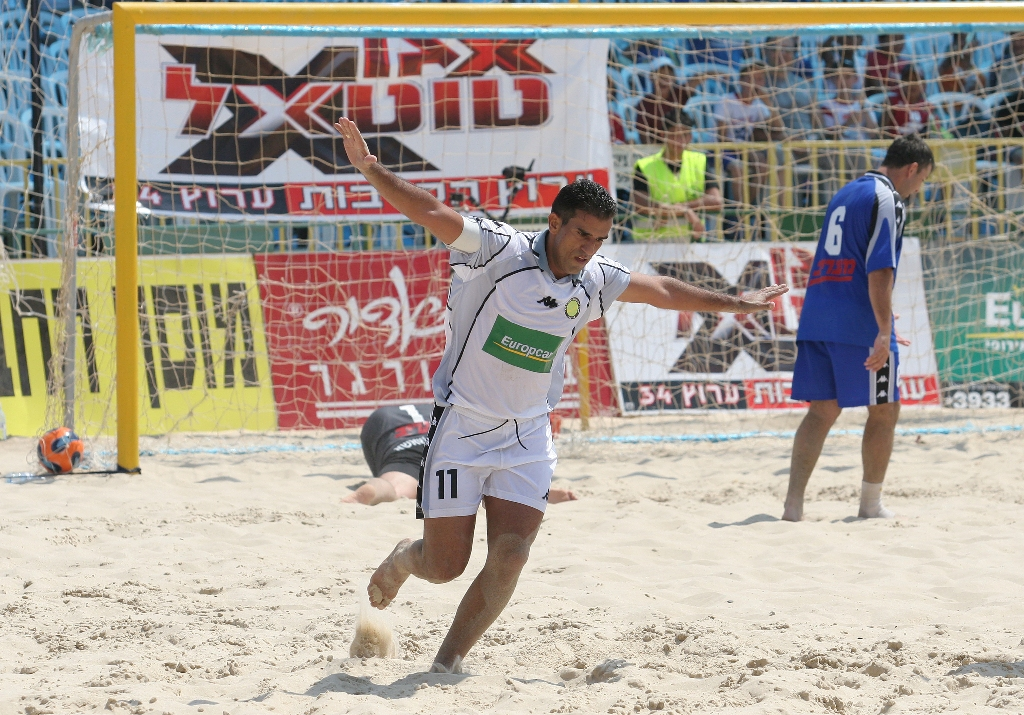
- Mizrahi in 2007, doing his famous "Airplane" move.

Personal information
- Full name: Alon Mizrahi
- Date of birth: 22 November 1971 (age 54)
- Place of birth: Tel Aviv, Israel
- Height: 1.78 m (5 ft 10 in)
- Position: Striker

Youth career
- 1984–1989: Bnei Yehuda

Senior career*
Years	Team	Apps	(Gls)
1989–1993	Bnei Yehuda	66	(46)
1990–1991	→ Hapoel Tel Aviv (loan)	18	(4)
1993–1994	Maccabi Haifa	38	(28)
1994	Maccabi Tel Aviv	10	(1)
1994–1999	Maccabi Haifa	53	(35)
1995	→ Maccabi Ironi Ashdod (loan)	14	(9)
1995–1997	→ Bnei Yehuda (loan)	44	(31)
1999	Nice	18	(4)
1999–2001	Beitar Jerusalem	50	(21)
2001–2003	Hapoel Kfar Saba	50	(22)
2003	Maccabi Ahi Nazareth	7	(1)
2003–2005	Hapoel Be'er Sheva	45	(16)
2004	→ Bnei Yehuda (loan)	9	(0)
2005–2006	Maccabi Amishav		

International career
1990	Israel U18	1	(1)
1990–1993	Israel U21	13	(15)
1992–2001	Israel	37	(17)
2007–2010	Israel (beach soccer)		

Managerial career
- 2008–2009: Hapoel Yehud
- 2012–2013: Hapoel Kfar Saba (general manager)
- 2013: Hapoel Petah Tikva
- * Club domestic league appearances and goals

Alon Mizrahi (Hebrew: אלון מזרחי; born 22 November 1971) is an Israeli former professional footballer who played for clubs including Nice, Maccabi Tel Aviv, Hapoel Tel Aviv, Hapoel Be'er Sheva, Maccabi Haifa and Beitar Jerusalem.

His nickname is "The Airplane" (Hebrew: האווירון, romanized: Ha-Avirón), referring to how he used to T-pose after scoring a goal.

== Personal life ==
His father, Amos Mizrahi was also a footballer who played in Bnei Yehuda in the 1990s and was part of the team that won the State Cup in 1968. He was married to Vered Mizrahi from 1994 until their divorce in 2020 and the couple had 2 daughters and a son. His middle daughter Sun Mizrahi is a supermodel.

== International career ==
=== International goals ===
Scores and results list Israel's goal tally first, score column indicates score after each Mizrahi goal.

List of international goals scored by Alon Mizrahi
No.	Date	Venue	Opponent	Score	Result	Competition
1	24 March 1993	Kiryat Eliezer Stadium, Haifa, Israel	Russia	1–2	2–2	Friendly
2	24 March 1993	Kiryat Eliezer Stadium, Haifa, Israel	Russia	2–2	2–2	Friendly
3	5 August 1997	Dinamo Stadium, Minsk, Belarus	Belarus	3–1	3–2	Friendly
4	19 February 1998	Ramat Gan Stadium, Ramat Gan, Israel	Turkey	3–0	4–0	Friendly
5	19 February 1998	Ramat Gan Stadium, Ramat Gan, Israel	Turkey	4–0	4–0	Friendly
6	18 March 1998	Stadionul Steaua, Bucharest, Romania	Romania	1–0	1–0	Friendly
7	17 May 1998	Skonto Stadium, Riga, Latvia	Latvia	5–0	5–1	Friendly
8	10 October 1998	Stadio Olimpico, Serravalle, San Marino	San Marino	3–0	5–0	Euro 2000 qualifying
9	18 January 1999	Ramat Gan Stadium, Ramat Gan, Israel	Estonia	5–0	7–0	Friendly
10	23 March 1999	Ramat Gan Stadium, Ramat Gan, Israel	Cyprus	2–0	3–0	Euro 2000 qualifying
11	23 March 1999	Ramat Gan Stadium, Ramat Gan, Israel	Cyprus	3–0	3–0	Euro 2000 qualifying
12	6 June 1999	Ramat Gan Stadium, Ramat Gan, Israel	Austria	4–0	5–0	Euro 2000 qualifying
13	8 September 1999	Ramat Gan Stadium, Ramat Gan, Israel	San Marino	2–0	8–0	Euro 2000 qualifying
14	3 September 2000	Ramat Gan Stadium, Ramat Gan, Israel	Liechtenstein	1–0	2–0	2002 World Cup qualifying
15	17 January 2001	Municipal Stadium, Beit She'an, Israel	Uzbekistan	2–0	2–0	Friendly
16	24 April 2001	Mikheil Meskhi Stadium, Tbilisi, Georgia	Georgia	1–1	2–3	Friendly
17	24 April 2001	Mikheil Meskhi Stadium, Tbilisi, Georgia	Georgia	2–2	2–3	Friendly

== Personal achievements ==
- Mizrahi was the top scorer of the UEFA Cup Winners' Cup in seasons 1993-94 and 1998-99.
- Mizrahi scored 206 goals in the Israeli Premier League. Mizrahi broke the scoring record of the Israeli legendary striker Oded Machnes and became the greatest goal-scorer in Israeli history.
- Mizrahi has maintained an impressive strike rate, of a goal in every two games, throughout his career.
- Mizrahi won four times the "Goal King" title, awarded to the player who scores the most in the premier league season. He won the title twice with Bnei Yehuda and twice with Maccabi Haifa.
- Mizrahi won 2 championships (with Bnei Yehuda and with Maccabi Haifa), 1 cup (with Maccabi Haifa) and participated twice in the Cup Winners' Cup (with Maccabi Haifa) and Peace Cup (with Beitar Jerusalem).
- Mizrahi scored 28 goals in 1993–94 for Maccabi Haifa. This is a (shared) Israeli record of goals per season in the Israeli Premier League.
- Mizrahi scored 15 goals in European club competitions.

== Honours ==
Bnei Yehuda

- Israeli Premier League: 1989–90
- Toto Cup: 1991–92, 1996–97

Maccabi Haifa

- Israeli Premier League: 1993–94
- State Cup: 1997–98
- Toto Cup: 1993–94

Individual

- Israeli Premier League top goalscorer: 1991–92, 1992–93, 1993–94, 1997–98
- UEFA Cup Winners' Cup top goalscorer: 1993–94, 1998–99

Sporting positions
Preceded by Marco Balbul	Maccabi Haifa captain 1998–1999	Succeeded by Arik Benado
