= Elisha Levy =

Retired Israeli footballer

Elisha Levy אלישע לוי
Personal information
- Full name: Elisha Levy
- Date of birth: November 18, 1957 (age 68)
- Place of birth: Jerusalem, Israel
- Position: Midfielder

Team information
- Current team: Bnei Yehuda Tel Aviv (manager)

Youth career
- 1968–1974: Hapoel Beit She'an

Senior career*
Years	Team	Apps	(Gls)
1974–1982	Hapoel Beit She'an	–	(–)
1982–1983	Maccabi Haifa	23	(0)
1983–1987	Maccabi Petah Tikva	–	(–)
1987–1989	Hapoel Beit She'an	–	(–)

Managerial career
- 1989–1995: Hapoel Beit She'an
- 1995–1996: Maccabi Herzliya
- 1996–1997: Tzafririm Holon
- 1997–1999: Hapoel Beit She'an
- 1999–2001: Ironi Rishon LeZion
- 2001: Hapoel Kfar Saba
- 2001–2004: F.C. Ashdod
- 2004–2006: Hapoel Kfar Saba
- 2006–2008: Bnei Sakhnin
- 2008–2012: Maccabi Haifa
- 2012–2015: Hapoel Be'er Sheva
- 2016–2017: Israel
- 2018–2019: Maccabi Petah Tikva
- 2020: Bnei Yehuda Tel Aviv
- 2020–2021: Hapoel Kfar Saba
- 2021–2022: Hapoel Haifa
- 2022–: Bnei Yehuda Tel Aviv
- * Club domestic league appearances and goals

Elisha Levy (Hebrew: אלישע לוי; born 18 November 1957) is a retired Israeli association footballer and currently the manager of Bnei Yehuda.

== Career ==
=== Player ===
Levy was born in Jerusalem, Israel, to a Jewish family. In the beginning of the 1960s, he moved with his family to Beit She'an, Israel. At the age of 11, he joined Hapoel Beit She'an children's club. He continued to play for them through the ranks when in 1974 he started playing with the senior squad. Levy played for Beit She'an for four years in third division, and another four years in second division before he moved to first division team Maccabi Haifa.

In 1982–83 Levy played as captain for Maccabi and reached State Cup semi final. After coach Jack Mansell left Levy was put on the bench and in the following season he moved to Maccabi Petah Tikva.

After playing for Petah Tikva for four seasons he decided to return to his youth club Hapoel Beit She'an. He played for two seasons before he retired and was appointed as head coach of the team.

- Coach

Levy coached Bet She'an for six years in his first term. In season 1992–93 he won Second division promotion. The following year he made history when Beit She'an was promoted to the Liga Leumit, then the top division. In season 1995–96 he managed Maccabi Herzliya, but after a bad season opening he was fired. In the following year he was coach of Tzafririm Holon.

In season 1997–98 He returned for a 2nd term at Hapoel Beit She'an. That season is famous for what was known to be the Shoelaces game, where Hapoel Beit She'an with Levy as manager, was accused of giving Beitar Jerusalem a win on the final day of the league, consequently Beitar won the title.

Two years later Levy was appointed coach of Ironi Rishon LeZion in 1998–99 and lead the team to 6th place, a record position for the club. He continued to coach Rishon until he was fired at the end of 2000–01 with new owners Lior Shahar arrival. Two weeks later he was announced as the new Hapoel Kfar Saba coach. Kfar Saba were placed last, 7 points from staying in the league. Even after a series of impressive victories Levy could not save Kfar Saba from relegation.

In 2001–02 as manager of F.C. Ashdod Levy managed to reach 4th place earning the Intertoto spot. That year he reached the final of the Toto Cup but lost to Hapoel Tel Aviv. He was replaced half season in 2003–04 by Yossi Mizrahi. He returned to Hapoel Kfar Saba in 2005, then in the second league, and won promotion. Half way in the following season Levy resigned when Kfar Saba were at last place.

In 2006–07 he managed Bnei Sakhnin, earning promotion to the Israeli Premier League. In 2007–08 Levy and Sakhnin reached record 4th place and the right to play in Intertoto Cup 2nd round. On 2 April 2008 it was announced that Levy would be the next Maccabi Haifa manager. He signed a one-year contract and replaced former manager Ronny Levy and won the Israeli championship in 2008/2009 season, a feat repeated two years later.

On May 23, 2018 Levi signed to Israeli Premier League club Maccabi Petah Tikva F.C.

== Personal life ==
Levy is married and a father of two. He lives in Kfar Saba. He also has a brother, Elias who also was a football player in Hapoel Beit She'an that now works a manager. The Levy brothers worked together in Hapoel Beit She'an when Elias worked as Elisha's assistant and also in Maccabi Herzliya in the mid-1990s.

== Honours ==
As player

- With Hapoel Beit She'an:
  - Liga Alef (3rd League) Promotion: 1977/78

As coach

- With Hapoel Beit She'an:
  - Liga Alef (3rd League) Promotion: 1992/93≤
  - Liga Artzit (2nd League) Promotion: 1993/94
- With F.C. Ashdod:
  - Toto Cup Runner up: 2001/02
- With Hapoel Kfar Saba:
  - Liga Leumit (2nd League) Promotion: 2004/05
- With Bnei Sakhnin:
  - Liga Leumit (2nd League) Promotion: 2006/07

With Maccabi Haifa:

- Israeli Premier League Champion: 2008–09, 2010–11

== Managerial statistics ==
As of match played 9 October 2017

Team	From	To	Record				
Team	From	To	G	W	D	L	Win %
Maccabi Haifa	2008	2012	140	87	31	22	69.5
Israel	2016	Present	12	4	1	7	33.33
