= Rafi Cohen (footballer, born 1970) =

Israeli footballer

Personal information
- Full name: Rafi Cohen
- Date of birth: 28 November 1970 (age 55)
- Place of birth: Eilat, Israel
- Height: 1.90 m (6 ft 3 in)
- Position: Goalkeeper

Team information
- Current team: Hapoel Petah Tikva

Senior career*
Years	Team	Apps	(Gls)
1987–1988	Hapoel Eilat		
1988–1993	Hapoel Petah Tikva	139	(0)
1993–1996	Maccabi Haifa	91	(0)
1996–1997	Hapoel Haifa	30	(0)
1997–1998	Bnei Yehuda	28	(0)
1998–1999	Maccabi Tel Aviv	6	(0)
1999–2001	Hapoel Petah Tikva	60	(0)
2001	Maccabi Kiryat Gat	8	(0)
2002	Maccabi Petah Tikva	23	(0)
2002–2007	Hapoel Petah Tikva	125	(0)
2007–2010	Hapoel Ramat Gan	78	(0)
2010–2013	Hapoel Jerusalem	72	(0)

International career^{‡}
1992–2000	Israel	43	(0)

Managerial career
- 2013–present: Hapoel Petah Tikva (goalkeeping coach)
- * Club domestic league appearances and goals as of 17 July 2009 ‡ National team caps and goals as of 17 July 2009

Rafi Cohen (Hebrew: רפי כהן, born 28 November 1970) is a retired Israeli footballer who played for 26 years.

== Biography ==
Cohen began his career with Hapoel Eilat in 1987. After a single season he was transferred to Hapoel Petah Tikva, where he made 139 appearances, and also appeared for the Israel national team. In 1993, he moved to Maccabi Haifa, before transferring to city rivals Hapoel in 1996. After a season at Hapoel Haifa he moved onto Bnei Yehuda and then in 1998 Maccabi Tel Aviv. In 1999, he returned to Hapoel Petah Tikva and made his last appearance for Israel in 2000. He left the club again in 2001 to join Maccabi Kiyat Gat. He moved to Maccabi Petah Tikva the following year, before returning to Hapoel Petah Tikva for a third time in 2002. In 2007, he left to join Hapoel Ramat Gan. After 3 seasons in Ramat Gan he moved in July 2010 to Hapoel Jerusalem.

Cohen played 43 times for Israel between 1992 and 2000.

== Honours ==
- Israeli Premier League
  - Winner (1): 1993–94
  - Runner-up (4): 1988–89, 1989–90, 1990–91, 1994–95
- Israel State Cup
  - Winner (2): 1993, 1995
  - Runner-up (1): 1991
- Toto Cup
  - Winner (4): 1989–90, 1990–91, 1993–94, 2004–05
- Liga Alef South:
  - Winner (1): 2010-11
