= Alon Hazan =

Israeli footballer and coach

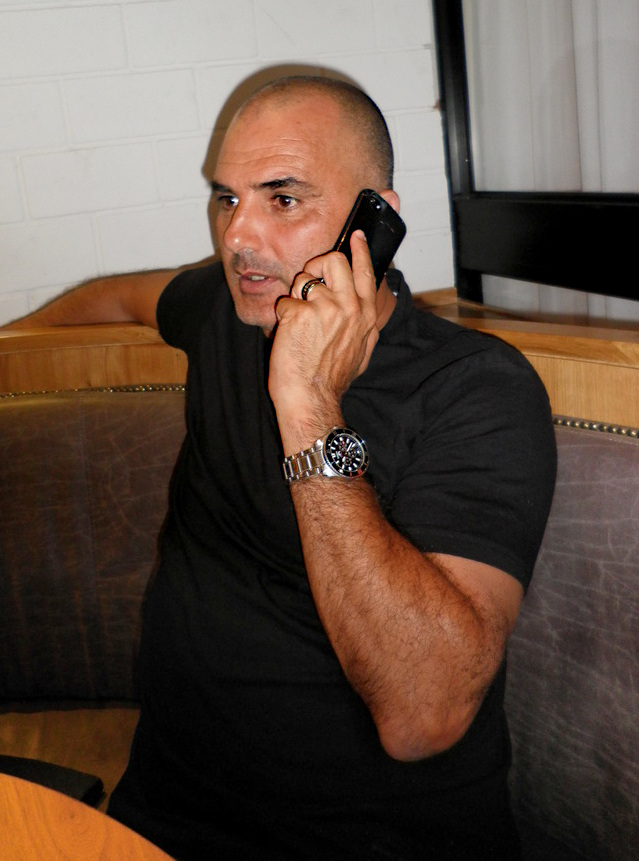
- Hazan in 2013

Personal information
- Full name: Alon Hazan
- Date of birth: 14 September 1967 (age 59)
- Place of birth: Ashdod, Israel
- Height: 1.85 m (6 ft 1 in)
- Position: Midfielder

Team information
- Current team: Israel (manager)

Youth career
- 1983–1984: Hapoel Ashdod
- 1984–1985: Hapoel Petah Tikva

Senior career*
Years	Team	Apps	(Gls)
1984–1989	Hapoel Petah Tikva	98	(12)
1989–1990	Hapoel Ashdod	24	(7)
1990–1992	Hapoel Petah Tikva	78	(9)
1992–1996	Maccabi Haifa	119	(20)
1996–1997	Hapoel Tel Aviv	23	(3)
1997–1998	Budapest	20	(2)
1998–1999	Watford	32	(2)
1999–2004	F.C. Ashdod	151	(20)
Total		54	(77)

International career
1990–2000	Israel	72	(5)

Managerial career
- 2006–2008: F.C. Ashdod
- 2008–2010: Israel U-16
- 2010: Maccabi Tel Aviv (youth)
- 2010–2018: Israel U-17
- 2016: Israel (caretaker)
- 2018: Israel (caretaker)
- 2018–2020: Israel (assistant)
- 2020–2021: Israel (caretaker)
- 2021–2022: Israel U-21
- 2022–2024: Israel
- * Club domestic league appearances and goals

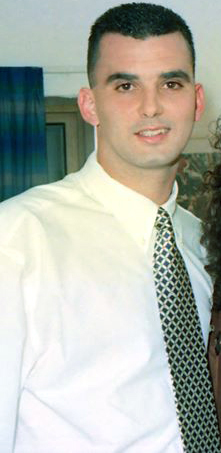
Hazan in 1992

Alon Hazan (Hebrew: אלון חזן; born 14 September 1967) is an Israeli former footballer and manager. As a player, he played as a midfielder.

== Biography ==
Alon Hazan was raised in Ashdod, Israel, to an observant Masorti Jewish family.

Outside of football, he studied for a degree in politics.

== Club career ==
Hazan spent most of his playing career in Israel, but did spend 18 months with English club Watford, with whom he achieved two promotions – from Division Two to the English Premier League. In 1999 Hazan scored in the penalty-shootout semi-final play-off against Birmingham City to put Watford into the play-off final against Bolton Wanderers, which they won 2–0 at Wembley, to earn promotion to the Premier League. He returned home to Israel, for personal reasons, before he could play a part in the top tier of English football.

== International career ==
As a football player, Hazan capped 72 times and scored 5 goals for the senior Israel, between 1990 and 2000..

== Managerial career ==
As of 8 May 2022, Hazan is the official national head coach who manages the senior Israel national team.

== Honours ==
- Toto Cup: 1985–86, 1989–90, 1990–91, 1993–94
- Israel State Cup: 1992, 1993, 1995
- Liga Leumit: 1993–94

Watford

- Football League First Division play-offs: 1999

== See also ==
- List of Jewish footballers
- List of Jews in sports
- List of Jews in sports (non-players)
- List of Israelis

== Managerial Statistics ==
As of Match played 21 March 2024

Team	From	To	Record				
Team	From	To	G	W	D	L	Win %
Israel	8 May 2022	27 March 2024	18	7	5	6	38.89
