= Arik Benado =

Israeli association footballer (born 1973)

Arik Benado אריק בנאדו
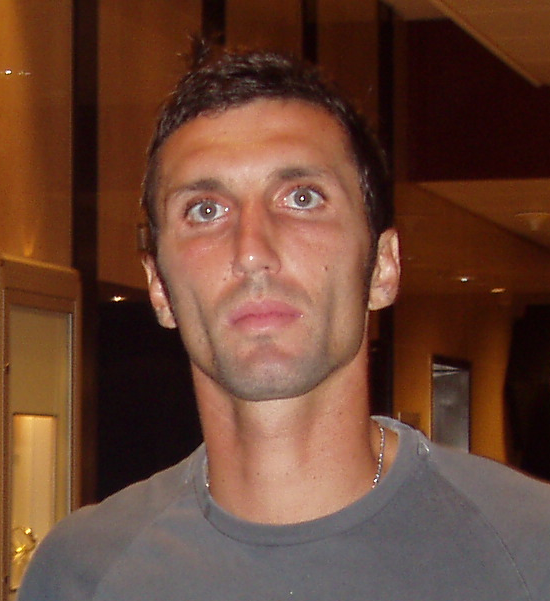
- Benado in 2006

Personal information
- Date of birth: 5 December 1973 (age 52)
- Place of birth: Haifa, Israel
- Height: 1.83 m (6 ft 0 in)
- Positions: Centre-back; sweeper

Youth career
- 1990–1991: Maccabi Haifa

Senior career*
Years	Team	Apps	(Gls)
1991–1994	Maccabi Haifa	71	(2)
1994–1996	Beitar Jerusalem	45	(0)
1996–2006	Maccabi Haifa	304	(7)
2006–2010	Beitar Jerusalem	124	(2)
2010–2011	Maccabi Haifa	25	(0)
Total		569	(11)

International career
1990–1991	Israel	7	(1)
1992–1995	Israel U-21	39	(1)
1995–2007	Israel	94	(0)

Managerial career
- 2012: Maccabi Haifa (youth)
- 2012–2014: Maccabi Haifa
- 2014–2015: Israel (assistant)
- 2015–2016: Israel U-21
- 2016: Bnei Yehuda
- 2017: Hapoel Ramat Gan
- 2018–2019: Maccabi Haifa (youth)
- * Club domestic league appearances and goals

Ariel "Arik" Benado (Hebrew: אריאל "אריק" בנאדו; born 5 December 1973) is an Israeli football manager and former player who played as a centre-back.

== Playing career ==
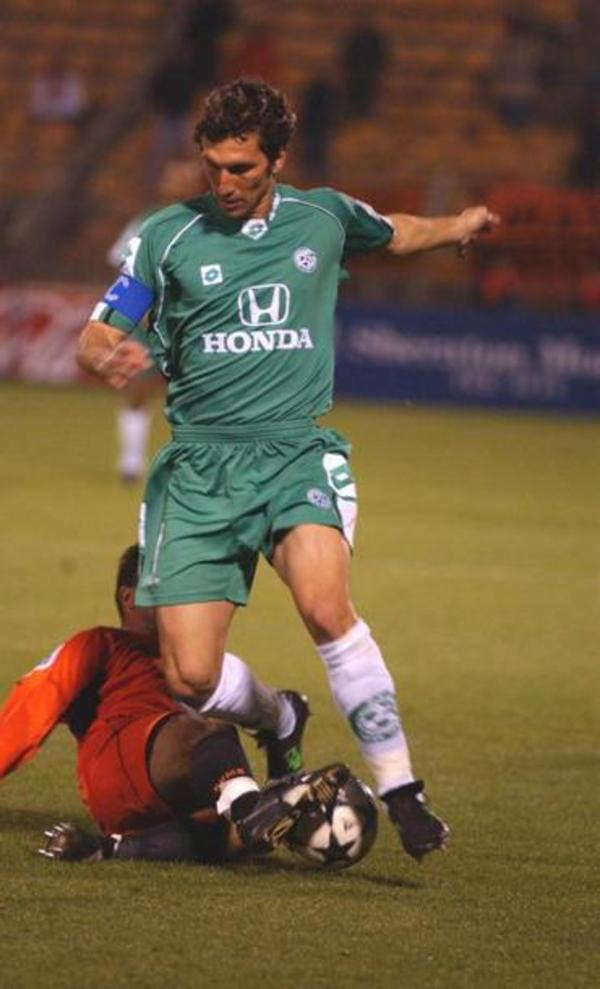
Benado playing for Maccabi Haifa in 2006

Benado was a second-generation player at one of Israel's major association football clubs, Maccabi Haifa; his father Shlomo Benado appeared for Maccabi Haifa in the 1970s. Arik began playing at the age of nine, rising through the ranks to the senior team. He spent a two-year spell with Beitar Jerusalem in the mid-1990s to gain experience. He has won five league championships and a State Cup title with Maccabi. Benado is also a long-standing member of the Israel national team where he holds the record as the most capped player (94 caps), and plays as a central defender. He is a tough defender, his strength lies in his tackling due to quick foot work. He had successfully defended against top strikers with the club and the national team in Europe. He has also appeared for Maccabi in the UEFA Champions League group stage. Beitar signed him for his second term in the club for the 2006–07 season.

In June 2010, Benado agreed to return to Maccabi Haifa for one last season before his retirement in June 2011. He started on the bench but quickly became Elisha Levi's first choice in Maccabi Haifa's defense, helping Maccabi Haifa to win the championship.

== Coaching career ==
On 17 November 2012, Benado was appointed as caretaker manager for Maccabi Haifa, before being appointed as the full manager a week later on 25 November 2012.

On 25 February 2014, Benado was appointed as the assistant manager for Eli Guttman in the Israel national team.

On 4 May 2015, Benado was appointed as the manager for the Israel national under-21 football team.

== Managerial statistics ==
As of 14 March 2016.

Team	Nat	From	To	Record				
Team	Nat	From	To	P	W	D	L	Win %
Maccabi Haifa	(Israel)	17 November 2012	17 May 2014	78	38	17	23	48.72
Israel U-21	(Israel)	5 May 2015		6	2	2	2	33.33
Total				84	40	19	25	47.62

== Honours ==
=== Player ===
- Israeli Premier League: 1993–94, 2000–01, 2001–02, 2003–04, 2004–05, 2005–06, 2006–07, 2007–08, 2010–11; runner-up 1999–00, 2002–03
- State Cup: 1993, 1998, 2008, 2009; runner-up 2002, 2011
- Toto Cup: 1993–94, 2001–02, 2005–06, 2009–10

=== Manager ===
- Israeli Premier League: runner-up 2012-13

=== Individual ===
- Israeli Premier League Best Defender of the Year: 2007–08

== See also ==
- List of select Jewish football (association; soccer) players
