= 1992–93 Israel State Cup =

Tournament details
- Country: Israel

Final positions
- Champions: Maccabi Haifa (3rd title)
- Runners-up: Maccabi Tel Aviv

The 1992–93 Israel State Cup (Hebrew: גביע המדינה, Gvia HaMedina) was the 54th season of Israel's nationwide football cup competition and the 39th after the Israeli Declaration of Independence.

The competition was won by Maccabi Haifa who had beaten Maccabi Tel Aviv 1–0 in the final.

By winning, Maccabi Haifa qualified to the 1993–94 European Cup Winners' Cup, entering in the qualifying round.

== Format Changes ==
The competition reverted to being played as one-legged ties for each round, with the ties being settled in one match, including extra time and penalties.

== Results ==
=== Eighth Round ===
Home team	Score	Away team
Beitar Jerusalem	9–0	Beitar Ramla
Bnei Yehuda	3–0	Shimshon Tel Aviv
Hakoah Maccabi Ramat Gan	2–1	Hapoel Haifa
Hapoel Ashkelon	2–2 (a.e.t.) 2–3 p.	Hapoel Be'er Sheva
Hapoel Tzafririm Holon	3–0	Hapoel Ramat Gan
Maccabi Acre	1–2	Beitar Tel Aviv
Maccabi Haifa	2–1	Maccabi Herzliya
Maccabi Kiryat Gat	1–2	Hapoel Tel Aviv
Maccabi Netanya	3–2	Maccabi Ironi Ashdod
Maccabi Tel Aviv	5–0	Maccabi Sha'arayim
Hapoel Umm al-Fahm	1–2	Hapoel Petah Tikva
Sektzia Nes Tziona	0–2	Maccabi Petah Tikva

Byes: Hapoel Ashdod, Hapoel Tirat HaCarmel, Hapoel Yehud, Maccabi Afula.

=== Round of 16 ===
Home team	Score	Away team
Bnei Yehuda	4–1	Hapoel Ashdod
Maccabi Netanya	4–1	Hakoah Maccabi Ramat Gan
Hapoel Be'er Sheva	1–2	Hapoel Tel Aviv
Maccabi Afula	0–1	Beitar Jerusalem
Maccabi Haifa	1–0	Hapoel Tzafririm Holon
Hapoel Yehud	2–1	Hapoel Tirat HaCarmel
Maccabi Petah Tikva	2–1	Maccabi Tel Aviv
Beitar Tel Aviv	2–1	Hapoel Petah Tikva

=== Quarter-finals ===
Home team	Score	Away team
Hapoel Yehud	0–3	Maccabi Tel Aviv
Hapoel Tel Aviv	3–2	Bnei Yehuda
Beitar Jerusalem	0–0 (a.e.t.) 7–8 p.	Maccabi Netanya
Maccabi Haifa	2–1	Beitar Tel Aviv

=== Semi-finals ===
Home team	Score	Away team
Maccabi Tel Aviv	1–1 (a.e.t.) 4–3 p.	Maccabi Netanya
Maccabi Haifa	1–0	Hapoel Tel Aviv

=== Final ===
18 May 1993

Maccabi Tel Aviv	0–1	Maccabi Haifa
		Atar 77'

Ramat Gan Stadium
Attendance: 20000
Referee: Ben Itzhak
