= Alon Harazi =

Israeli footballer and manager

Alon Harazi אלון חרזי
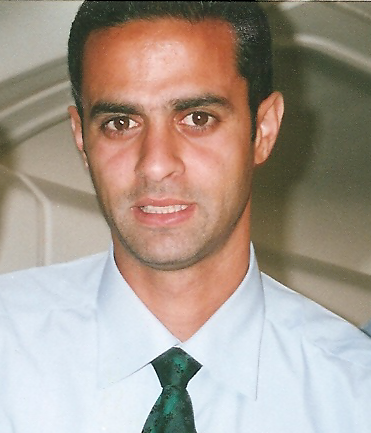

Personal information
- Date of birth: February 13, 1971 (age 55)
- Place of birth: Tel Aviv, Israel
- Height: 1.79 m (5 ft 10 1/2 in)
- Position: Defender

Youth career
- 1984–1990: Hakoah Ramat Gan

Senior career*
Years	Team	Apps	(Gls)
1989–1990	Hakoah Ramat Gan	-	(-)
1990–1997	Maccabi Haifa	209	(14)
1997–1998	Beitar Jerusalem	29	(5)
1998–2009	Maccabi Haifa	286	(15)
Total		524	(34)

International career^{‡}
1992–2006	Israel	89	(1)

Managerial career
- 2009–2013: Maccabi Haifa (scout)
- 2013–2014: Hapoel Acre (sport director)
- 2014–2015: Hapoel Acre
- 2017–2020: Israel U21 (assistant)
- * Club domestic league appearances and goals ‡ National team caps and goals as of 14 April 2007

Alon Harazi (Hebrew: אלון חרזי; born February 13, 1971) is a retired Israeli footballer and currently the Israel youth team assistant manager.

== Life and career ==
Harazi finished his career during the season of 2009/2010 as captain and the most veteran player at Maccabi Haifa. He came to the club in 1990 at the age of 18 from a third Division team. He began as a striker in Hakoah Ramat Gan youth teams and in there senior squad but at his late career played in defensive roles, mostly as a central defender or right back.

Harazi has made 89 international appearances for Israel and won 9 league championships, more than any other Israeli player – 8 of those championships were with Maccabi Haifa (1 more was with Beitar Jerusalem) as well as three State Cup titles. Harazi has made 400 league appearances with Maccabi Haifa - a team record, which was celebrated during November 2005 league match versus Maccabi Tel Aviv but continued and put a higher record on the number of 498 performances only with Maccabi Haifa Harazi played one more season with Beitar Jerusalem and broke the Israeli league performances with the number of 524.

Harazi was the fastest player in Israel, had an excellent header, with an outstanding understanding of the game. He appeared with Maccabi Haifa 2 times in the UEFA Champions League group stage.

His grandfather played football for Makkabi Judah in Poland.

On June 3, 2009, it was announced that Harazi decided to retire from professional soccer and will play his last game in the summer of 2009, in the UEFA Champion's League qualifying round with Maccabi Haifa.

On December 8, 2009, Harazi officially retired from the game against Bordeaux in the last game of the UEFA Champions League group stage.

== Honours ==
- Israeli Premier League (9):
  - 1990-91, 1993–94, 1997–98, 2000–01, 2001–02, 2003–04, 2004–05, 2005–06, 2008–09
- Israel State Cup (3):
  - 1991, 1993, 1995
- Toto Cup (5):
  - 1993-94, 1997–98, 2001–02, 2005–06, 2007–08
