= Maccabi Haifa F.C. =

Association football club in Israel

Maccabi Haifa
- Full name: Maccabi Haifa Football Club
- Nicknames: The Greens; The Greens from the Carmel
- Short name: MHA
- Founded: 1913; 113 years ago
- Ground: Sammy Ofer Stadium, Haifa, Israel
- Capacity: 30,950
- Owner: Ya'akov Shahar
- President: Ya'akov Shahar
- Head coach: Ran Ben-Shimon
- 2025–26: Israeli Premier League, 5th of 14
- Website: mhaifafc.com
Home colours	Away colours	Third colours

Maccabi Haifa Football Club (Hebrew: מועדון הכדורגל מכבי חיפה, romanized: Moadon haKaduregel Makabi Ḥefa) is an Israeli professional football club based in the city of Haifa, Israel, a section of Maccabi Haifa sports club. The club plays in the Israeli Premier League. Maccabi Haifa home games are played at Sammy Ofer Stadium. The stadium, which is shared with rivals Hapoel Haifa, is the second largest in Israeli football, with a capacity of 30,950.

Maccabi Haifa is one of the "Big Four" clubs in Israeli football. The meaning of the name Maccabi – 'there is no one like you among the gods' – also refers to the Star of David in the team's logo. The side has won fifteen league titles, second only to the club's biggest rivals, Maccabi Tel Aviv, six State Cups and five Toto Cups. Maccabi Haifa has won the championship and the cup in the same season (referred to as winning the "double") once, and was the first Israeli club to qualify for the group stage of the UEFA Champions League, in the 2002–03 UEFA Champions League season. Maccabi Haifa holds the record, for the most Champions League group stage qualifications for an Israeli team in three occasions. In 2020–21, Maccabi Haifa won the Israeli Premier League, their first championship in a decade. The club won the next two titles on their way to three consecutive championships.

== History ==
A chart showing the progress of Maccabi Haifa through the Israeli football league system, from 1931–32 to the present

=== Early years ===
Maccabi Haifa Football Club was established in 1913 in the port city of Haifa in the Mutasarrifate of Jerusalem (present-day Israel). As the local football association wasn't founded in Mandatory Palestine until July 1928, there were no officially organized competitions during the season, and the club played only friendly matches.

After a period of inactivity, the club was re-organized in February 1923. The club playing a handful of matches during the season, including taking part in a cup competition which was called "The Hebrew Cup". Due to its distance, the club was given a bye to the final, which it lost to Maccabi Nes Tziona 0–2.

The club was overshadowed by its city rival Hapoel Haifa, but from its early years adopted an attacking style of play based on short passing.

In 1942, the club reached the Israel State Cup final, but was defeated 12–1 by Beitar Tel Aviv in the final.

Maccabi Haifa remained a small, struggling club that spent most of its time shifting between Liga Leumit and the lower leagues.

In 1962, the team defeated Maccabi Tel Aviv 5–2 in the State Cup final, and won the first title of the club. In 1963 it reached the final again, but lost to Hapoel Haifa 1–0 in the first Haifa derby in State Cup final.

=== The 1980s ===
In the 1980s Maccabi Haifa finally entered the 'Israeli' champions' club, clinching the title thrice (in 1983–84, 1984–85 and 1988–89 seasons).

In the 1983–84 season Maccabi Haifa won its first ever championship, under coach Shlomo Sharf and general manager Yochanan Vollach, overcoming Beitar Jerusalem and Hapoel Tel Aviv. The Yerukim (Greens) were known for their "all-around-offense" and flashy technique football style, often resulting in bad defensive formation and resultant losses.

Sharf's team played with 4 strikers, including: Moshe Selecter, Zahi Armeli and Ronny Rosenthal who were positioned at point and midfield and managed to build their defense around the legendary goalkeeper Avi Ran.

A year later, Maccabi Haifa won a second championship in a decisive performance. In 1986 Maccabi Haifa lost the championship in a controversial final match against runners-up Hapoel Tel Aviv. The single goal scored in that match by Gili Landau was said to be scored from a passive offside position, which by the rules of the time should have resulted in a disqualification of the goal and a scoreless draw, guaranteeing Maccabi Haifa the title. Due to poor TV coverage, the issue has never been resolved.

In 1988, Maccabi Haifa decimated Maccabi Tel Aviv 10–0 to earn its biggest win ever. That game, one of the more famous in Israeli's football lore, wasn't even televised. Furthermore, it probably was the beginning of the intense rivalry between the two clubs. In 1989, under the capable hands of Amazzia Levkovic, the club won another championship.

=== The 1990s ===
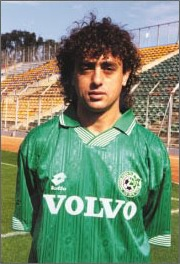
Reuven Atar, played 10 years at the club.

In the 1990s Maccabi Haifa established itself as a dominant club in Israel. It began by winning the Double – League championship and the national cup in the 1990–1 season and continued with the introduction of three talented young players: Eyal Berkovic, Reuven Atar and Tal Banin.

In 1992, Maccabi Haifa was purchased by Ya'akov Shahar, who became the owner and president of the club. Under Shahar's management, Maccabi Haifa enjoyed financial stability and professional working regulations on a par with European football clubs' standards. Maccabi Haifa's highlight season was 1993–94. After winning the 1993 cup, Maccabi Haifa gave a stunning performance in the UEFA Cup Winners' Cup (CWC), beating Torpedo Moscow 3–1 and Parma 1–0 in the last 16, only to lose on penalties. During the season in the domestic league (then called Liga Leumit), the team became the first and only in Israeli football history to go unbeaten for the entire season, with an overall unbeaten streak of 48 games, thus winning a spectacular championship, and breaking many Israeli records. The Maccabi Haifa 1993–94 squad including Eyal Berkovic, Reuven Atar, Alon Mizrahi and Serhiy Kandaurov, and is considered one of, if not the best squads in Israeli football history.

In 1995, Maccabi Haifa begun a period of seven years without winning the league championship, and most of its popular soccer superstar were sold to Europe. In 1996, Eyal Berkovic and Haim Revivo, the latter had joined the team the previous season, both left Haifa for European clubs. While the two gained great personal success there, Maccabi Haifa went into a slump. The team's standards of maintaining the services of the manager for multiple seasons was thrown as the team went through several managers during 4 years. As result, the team failed to win the national championship title, despite securing the National cup in 1998.

In 1999, under the guidance of the Czech manager Dušan Uhrin, Maccabi Haifa beat French giants Paris Saint-Germain and Austrian club SV Ried to reach the quarter-final of the Cup Winners' Cup. In the middle of the season, Haifa's excellent striker Alon Mizrahi left for French club Nice resulting in a defeat in the CWC quarter-final and a slump in the club's league performance. The club's winning record continued to falter until the arrival of Avram Grant.

=== 2000 and beyond ===
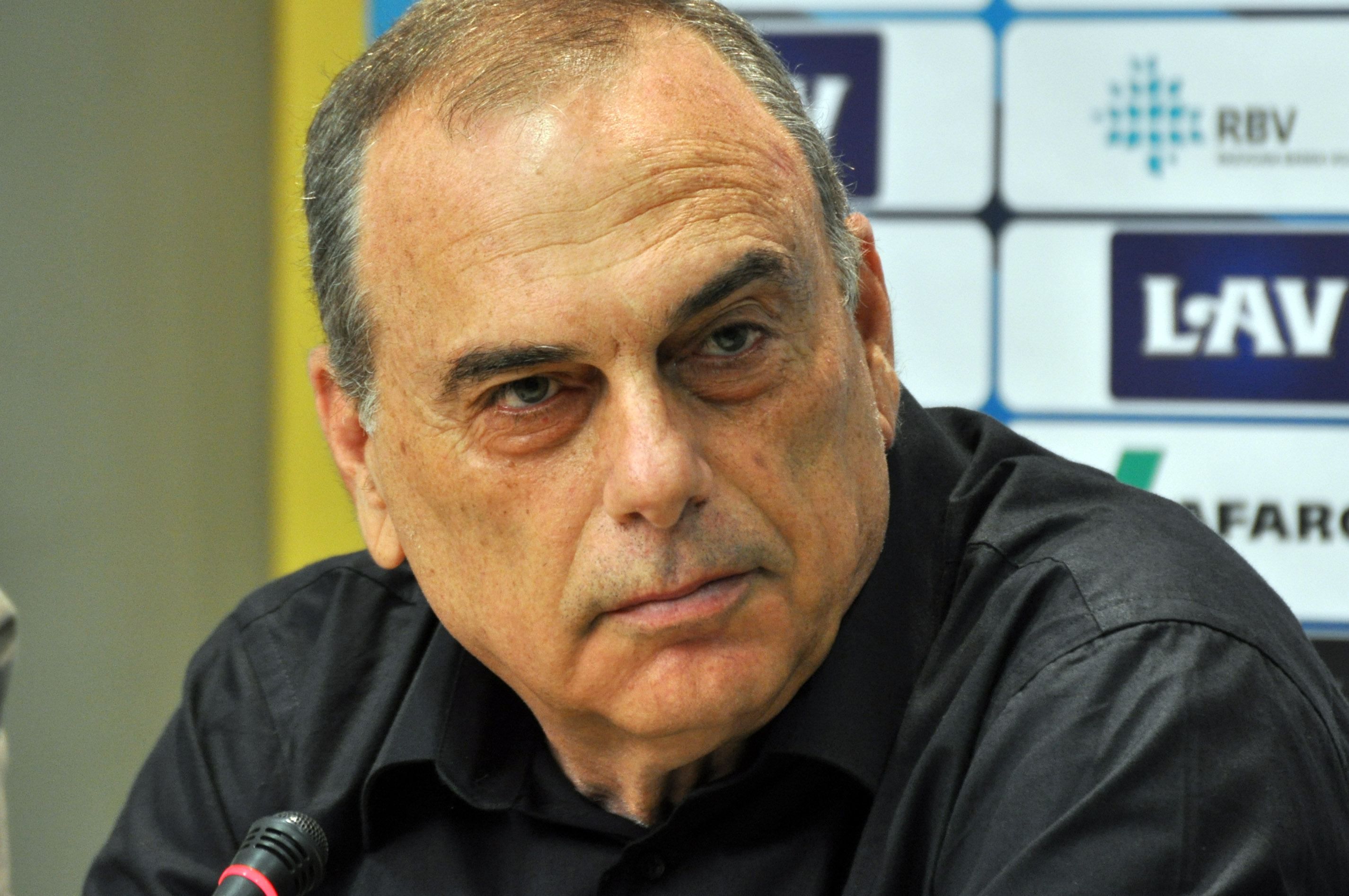
Avram Grant, Manager, 2000–02.

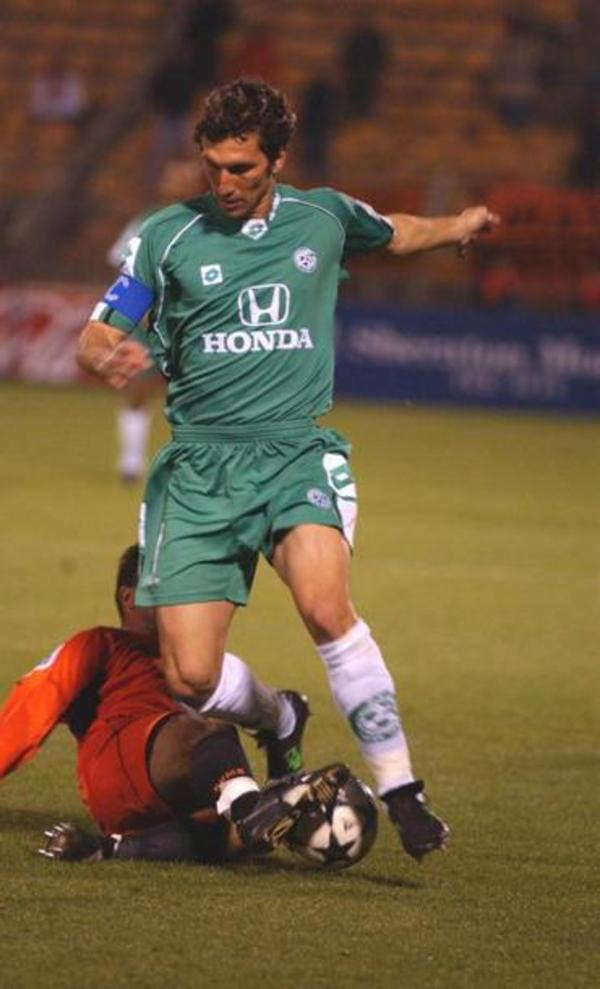
Arik Benado, team captain, 2000–2006.

Former Maccabi Tel Aviv Manager Avram Grant was appointed in 2000 as manager of Maccabi Haifa. Under Grant's guidance, the team regained its dominating offensive style. Grant, along with a much improved squad, led the club with an almost unstoppable team, winning the championship. At the center of attention were a series of virtuoso performances by Yossi Benayoun, including what some consider to be several of the finest goals in Israeli league history. A spontaneous burst of celebrating fans onto the pitch caused a tragic disaster. A young fan, Amir Rand, was crushed against the guarding rails and left comatose.

A year later, Grant won a second championship, relying on a veteran Israeli defense: Alon Harazi, Arik Benado and Adoram Keise, and on a trio of foreign footballers: Giovanni Rosso (Croatia), Raimondas Žutautas (Lithuania) and the young Nigerian striker Yakubu. Following the 2nd championship, Avraham Grant left Haifa for the Israeli national team and was replaced by then Israel U-21 manager Itzhak Shum.

In 2002, Haifa made Israeli club history by becoming the first Israeli team to qualify for the group phase of the UEFA Champions League. In the group phase, the team defeated Olympiacos and Manchester United. Haifa managed 7 points overall scoring 12 goals, and finished in 3rd place, securing a place in the UEFA Cup.

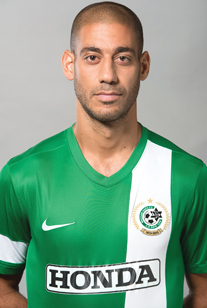
Yaniv Katan, played 15 years in the club and was captain of the team, 2006–14.

In the 2003–04 season Maccabi Haifa, led by ex-Maccabi Haifa footballer Ronny Levy, won the championship mainly due to the poor showing of the other league teams. Maccabi Haifa youth club (ages 16–18) won the domestic championship, and an Israel national kids team of Maccabi Haifa players won Fox Kids World Cup for 12-year-olds.

History was made during the 2005–06 season. After months of indecision regarding the contract of Ronny Levy, it was renewed and Levy guided the club to 11 straight victories in the first 11 games of the Israeli Premier League season. This was also the key to Maccabi Haifa taking the league title after building a strong lead. While the club enjoyed great domestic success, it was not as fortunate in European play. Though Haifa was a seeded team for the UEFA Champions League second qualifying round, it drew the strong Swedish club, Malmö FF. Haifa lost 3–2 in Sweden, and drew 2–2 at home.

In the 2006–07 season, the club played against Liverpool. In the 1st game of the 3rd round of the qualifying matches held in England, Haifa's Gustavo Boccoli scored on the 29th minute, an advantage that lasted just 4 minutes. Craig Bellamy evened the score and in front of 40,000 local fans, Haifa stood bravely up to the 88th minute when Mark González scored the winning goal for the hosts. Due to the security situation in Israel, the return match was not held in Ramat Gan but in Kyiv, Ukraine, at the Valery Lobanovsky stadium, with 1,700 spectators. The game ended in a 1–1 tie. The last twenty minutes of the game were stressful for Rafa Benitez's players. After Peter Crouch gave the guests the advantage (54) and an away goal, but Roberto Colautti (63) tied the score and from here on the movement towards the host's goalpost became one-sided. The tie score sent Haifa to compete in the UEFA Cup.

In the return match in Bulgaria against Litex Lovech, Haifa played well: Xavier Dirceu scored an impressive goal from distance, Alain Masudi and Roberto Colautti left Eljendario Sanderinio one honor goal. In the group stage, Haifa faced strong opponents: The Scottish Rangers, the Serbian Partizan Belgrade, the French Auxerre and the Italian Serie A team Livorno. In the 88th minute, the Scots succeeded in doubling the score from another penalty kick given away by a Haifa defender. This time Charlie Adam scored and sealed the victory. Haifa returned home and hosted Partizan Belgrade. An early goal by Anderson Xavier, the Brazilian midfielder, put Haifa in an excellent place with six points. Haifa needed one point in the away game in Italy against Livorno to complete the task successfully. At this stage Haifa was drawn against CSKA Moscow. The game was moved to the Spartak stadium in Vladikavkaz due to extreme weather in Moscow. 30,000 Russian fans crowded the stadium. Torpedo beat Haifa 1–0 and Lokomotiv beat it 3–0. Again Haifa did not score an away goal, but the result (0–0) signaled that Haifa might use its home advantage in the return match.

In the 2007–08 season, Maccabi Haifa finished 5th place in the league and was eliminated in the last-16 phase of the State Cup. Ronny Levy announced that he was leaving. Haifa won the Toto Cup after a 2–0 victory over Bnei-Sakhnin.

Haifa opened the 2008–09 season with hopes of remaining a top team. At the end of the season, coach Elisha Levy won his first personal title and Haifa made Israeli soccer history, winning six championships in one decade.

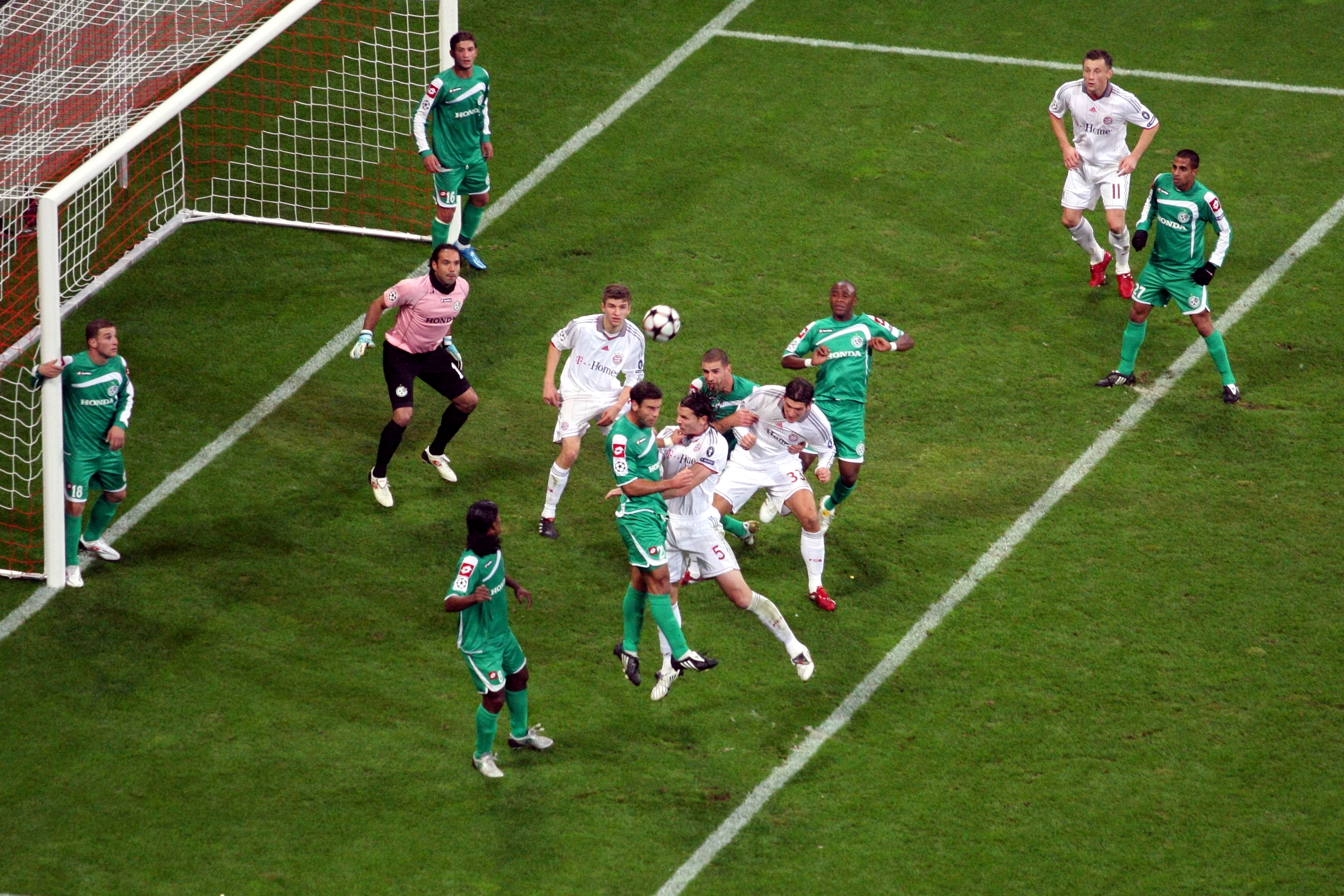
Maccabi Haifa against Bayern Munich in 2009–10 UEFA Champions League group stage.

Maccabi Haifa returned to the Champions League for the 2009–10 season. A 3–0 win over FC Red Bull Salzburg ensured its second win in the span of seven years, with goals by Dvalishvili, Golasa and Ghadir. Haifa entered the 2009–10 Champions League group stage in Group A, competing against Bayern Munich, Juventus and Bordeaux. Haifa finished the competition with a record of 6 losses, conceding 8 goals and without scoring. The club subsequently lost the championship title to Hapoel Tel Aviv on the last day of the season.

In the 2010–11 Israeli Premier League season, Maccabi Haifa has won the Israeli Championship title but lost the chance to achieve the Double by losing to rivals Hapoel Tel Aviv in the State Cup final.

The 2011–12 season was a disappointing one. After winning the League title in the previous season, the team started the season with qualification matches in the UEFA Champions League, but eliminated after a penalty defeat to the Belgian club Genk. Domestically, it was another disappointment. Maccabi Haifa struggled for the European football spot, and a draw in the last round wasn't enough, as Maccabi Haifa finished in a disappointing 5th place. Another failure was at the State Cup as the team lost in the Final to rivals Hapoel Tel Aviv from a controversial 93rd-minute goal. The disappointing season caused owner Ya'akov Shahar to appoint former player and club icon Reuven Atar as the manager for the next season instead of Elisha Levi, who left the club after clinching 2 championship titles in 4 years with the club.

With Reuven Atar on the sidelines, Haifa opened the season with 1 win, 4 draws, and 4 losses and was next to last, the worst start in club history. After the 9th round, Atar was fired and replaced by Arik Benado, the youth team coach and former team captain. Under Benado, Haifa returned to the top of the table and showed good performances during the season. Haifa gave fight to Maccabi Tel Aviv but finished 2nd.

On 25 July 2013, Maccabi Haifa defeated Khazar Lankaran 8–0 in the 2nd qualifying round of UEFA Europa League. thus setting a new record for the largest win by an Israeli club in European competition.

On 24 May 2016, Maccabi Haifa defeated Maccabi Tel Aviv 1–0 in the Israel State Cup Final, winning for the 1st time in 18 years and, thus, returning to European competition after 3 years.

In the start of the 2020/21 season, Maccabi Haifa reached the UEFA Europa League play-off round, beating Kairat Almaty and FC Rostov in the qualifying rounds. In the play-off round, the team lost 2–7 to Tottenham Hotspur, its biggest defeat ever in the tournament, and were eliminated. On 30 May 2021, after 10 long tough years full of disappointments for the club and its fans, Maccabi Haifa has won the Israeli Premier league championship, its 13th in total, defeating Hapoel Be'er Sheva 3–2 in the final fixture. Haifa's players Josh Cohen, Neta Lavi and Dolev Haziza won the league MVP titles, awarded by 3 major Israeli football organizations. Josh Cohen was voted footballer of the year, and the team's coach, Barak Bakhar, won the "coach of the year" title unequivocally.

In the start of the 2021/22 season, the team was eliminated by Kairat in the early qualifying rounds of the UEFA Champions League. Two weeks later, the team won the 2021 Israel Super Cup, after a 2–0 victory against the state cup winner Maccabi Tel Aviv. Despite its early elimination from the Champions League qualifiers, the team entered the Europa Conference League qualifiers, and qualified to the group stage after beating Neftci Baku in the play-off round. The team finished the UEFA Europa Conference League group stage in third place and did not advance to the knockout phase.

The club went on to win the league cup, and at the end of the season it won the 2021-22 Israeli Premier League championship, its second championship title in a row and 14th in total. Omer Atzili finished as the top scorer (20 goals) and top assister (10 assists), and was voted footballer of the year. The team reached the Israel State Cup final, but lost to Hapoel Be'er Sheva in a penalty shoot-out, and lost to Hapoel Be'er Sheva in penalty shoot-out again in the 2022 Israel Super Cup.

In August 2022 the club advanced to the UEFA Champions League group stage for the third time in its history, after beating Olympiacos and Apollon Limassol in the qualifying rounds, and beating Red Star Belgrade in the play-off round. In the group stage, the club was drawn into Group H with European giants Paris Saint-Germain, Juventus and Benfica. In matchday 2, Maccabi Haifa scored its first UEFA Champions League goal in 20 years, when Tjaronn Chery scored the opener against Paris Saint-Germain, a match which ended in a 1–3 loss. In matchday 4, Maccabi Haifa beat Juventus 2–0. In matchday 5, the team suffered a 7–2 defeat to Paris Saint-Germain, its biggest defeat ever in the tournament, and were eliminated.

On 15 May 2023, the team won the 2022–23 Israeli Premier League championship, the club's third championship title in a row and 15th in total, after a 1–5 victory over Maccabi Netanya, and became the first Israeli club to do so in a season which it also reached the UEFA Champions League group stage.

On 14 August 2025, during a UEFA Conference League match between Maccabi and Polish team Raków Częstochowa, Israeli fans displayed a banner reading "Murderers since 1939," which provoked significant outrage both in Poland and internationally. The banner, perceived as an offensive reference to the atrocities committed during World War II, sparked condemnation from various quarters. The Israeli Embassy in Poland described the action as "disgusting" and expressed that it did not reflect the views of the majority of Israeli fans. The Polish government and President Karol Nawrocki swiftly condemned the banner, emphasizing the harm caused to the memory of Polish citizens and Jews who perished during the war. Maccabi Haifa, in turn, faced widespread criticism, with club president Ya'akov Shahar condemning the actions of the fans, asserting that such behavior did not reflect the club’s values.

== Sponsorships, fan base and rivalries ==
Period	Kit Manufacturer	Shirt Sponsor
1977-1980	Adidas	Peleg TV's
1980–1982	Adidas	Alfa Romeo
1982–1984	Umbro	Zechariah Drucker
1984–1992	Adidas	Volvo
1992–1993	Lotto	Volvo
1993–1996	Lotto	Isracard
1996–1998	Nike	Volvo
1998–2002	Lotto	Volvo
2002–2004	Lotto	Honda
2004–2007	Puma	Honda
2007–2011	Lotto	Honda
2011–2018	Nike	Honda
2018–2023	Nike	Volvo
2023–	Adidas	Volvo

The club is sponsored by Ya'akov Shahar, chairman of Mayer's Cars and Trucks Ltd., the official importer to Israel of Volvo and Honda. The fan base is mainly in Haifa and northern Israel, although the club is one of the most popular in Israel. Average attendance in the home matches since the move to Sammy Ofer Stadium in 2015 is approximately 24,000 fans, the most in Israel. According to a survey which had been conducted in 2010, Maccabi Haifa has the biggest number of fans of all the teams in Israel, approximately 25.8% of Israeli football fans.

On 30 June 2011, a Haaretz poll identified Maccabi Haifa as the most popular football team among Arab citizens of Israel.

Another survey had been conducted in March 2012 by Yedioth confirmed that Maccabi Haifa is the most popular team among Israeli football fans (28%), female football fans (33%) and Arab citizens of Israel. Same survey revealed that 75% of Haifa residents support the team.

Historically, the most loyal fans at home games in Kiryat Eliezer Stadium were concentrated at stands 11–12, called also Yetzia Gimel (יציע ג') – C Block – a term which has become synonymous with the most hardcore and dedicated fans.

In 1994, Uzi Hitman composed and wrote the team's championship song titled "Green in the eyes" (ירוק בעיניים) and gave it to Haim Moshe, the song was a major hit amongst the club's fanbase and was later covered by Eden Ben Zaken in 2021 once again as a championship song. In 2004, following Hitman's death, a minute of silence was given to Hitman during a match against Bnei Yehuda Tel Aviv, which was followed by supporters singing the chorus of the famous championship song.

In 2002, The fans established an organization named Green Apes, which supports both soccer and basketball. Members usually sit in the bleachers section 11.

In addition, Maccabi Haifa has an official fan club which was founded in the first decade of the 21st century, and has about 20,000 members. The club is also supported overseas and is able to keep in touch with supporters overseas via the club website and online store.

At the 2008–09 Championship season the Maccabi Haifa audiences won the title of Fair Audience of the Year.

In 2010, another organization of fans was established for Maccabi Haifa, and named Inferno Verde, whose members sit in the stands section 5a. The organization's goal is not to outdo the Green Apes, but rather to join forces for victories and championships of the team.

Maccabi Haifa supporters have friendly relations with supporters of other clubs: Green Apes are in good relations with AZ Alkmaar's Alkmaar Fanatics and Avant Garde are in good relations with Werder Bremen's Ultra Boys

Number of surveys made during the first decade of the 21st century found that Maccabi Haifa is Israel's most favorite team.

At the beginning of the 21st century the club website was upgraded, at Walla!. The edits were made by the historian of the club, Isaac Haverman, and include breaking news, articles, information about the club, officials, staff, players and former players, information on past games, galleries, statistics, multi–seasonal Guinness Book of club and depth articles, some of which also include a unique research statistic, work of Haverman. The site also includes an online forum, online store and club fans.

Starting in 2011 Haifa operates an official Facebook page, which includes information, news, pictures, online ticketing- online and update time – real game results. The Facebook page has 83,000 registered fans. In February 2011, the club opened an official YouTube page, which puts up interviews of players and the coach before and after games. The club has uploaded about 373 movies and has approximately 3200 subscribers, and approximately 550,000 video views (as of May 2014).

=== City rivalry with Hapoel Haifa ===
For more information see: Haifa derby

=== The rivalry with Maccabi Tel Aviv ===
The strong rivalry between the two Israeli football clubs (sometimes called “the Israeli Classico” and “the derby of Israel”) is about the dominance among the various Maccabi football clubs, as well as in Israeli football in general, and the title of the best football club in Israel.

Maccabi Haifa aspires to oust Maccabi Tel Aviv from this position, which is the club with the largest number of titles in Israel, and to become the leading club in Israel by winning many titles and qualifying for the European Cup stages (Cup Winners' Cup, UEFA Cup). Haifa and Tel Aviv have competed against each other for the championship title, and Haifa beat Maccabi Tel Aviv in a number of games, including a 10–0 win in 1988 - a game seen as a "revenge" for the loss of 2–10 in 1949 (another large defeat, at 0–7, took place in 1952). Haifa beat Tel Aviv 5–0 in the 1993–94 season (in which Haifa won the championship without a single defeat, but was eliminated from the State Cup competition three days later following Maccabi Tel Aviv's 1–1 draw at Kiryat Eliezer). Maccabi Haifa became dominant in the Israeli Premier League in the first decade of the 21st century, as Maccabi Tel Aviv's positions weakened (except for the 2002–03 season). The rivalry between them somewhat cooled down at the end of that decade due to the renewed rise of Hapoel Tel Aviv, which competed at the top of the table during this period and won several championship titles. The rivalry focus thus briefly shifted to Hapoel Tel Aviv.

In the 2019–20 season, the rivalry between the two heated up once again, as after almost a decade of Macabbi Tel Aviv's dominance exacerbated by Maccabi Haifa's series of failures, the teams competed head-to-head for the championship. It ended with Maccabi Tel Aviv winning that year's campaign. In the following 2020–21 season, the two teams battled out for the league title once again, this time ending with Maccabi Haifa winning the championship. During the past few years, the two have produced some unforgettable matches, including a dramatic 4–3 win for Maccabi Tel Aviv and an incredible 3–2 win for Maccabi Haifa after a big comeback.

== Club crest ==
The origin of the club crest is the World Zionist sports organization "Maccabi". The basis of the crest is the stylized Hebrew word מכבי ("Maccabi") in the shape of the Star of David, symbolizing Judaism. This is in common with most other Maccabi teams in Israel and worldwide, which all use this symbol in one way or another. In most years only this stylized "Maccabi" star with the word חיפה ("Haifa") beneath it was the emblem of the club. Depending on the kit, it was green on white or white on green. With the success of the club at the end of the 1980s, an image of a lion was added next to the symbol, but this figure was removed later. At the beginning of the 1990s, after the club began competing in the European arena, the crest assumed its modern form - the image of a football inside a circular green band with the words מכבי חיפה מכ ("Maccabi Haifa FC") in Hebrew and English on it, with the original Maccabi symbol at the top right corner. At the end of 2005/2006 season, when the team won its 10th championship, a gold star was added above the symbol. At the end of the 2009 season winning its 11th championship, the team played its inaugural game with the traditional symbol of the club as it was in the early '80s. At the end of the 2013 season (on the 100th anniversary of the club's foundation), laurel leaves were temporarily added around the emblem, symbolizing victory and glory. In addition, a golden plaque was added indicating the year of the establishment of the club and the current year (100th club). After the 2019/20 season, the Israel Football Association administration decided that each championship star on the member clubs' crests should represent 5 championship titles. Since Maccabi has won 12 championships in total until then, the crest was updated with another championship star. After winning its 15th championship title at the end of the 2022-23 Israeli Premier League season, the club added a third star to its crest.

== Grounds ==
=== Kiryat Eliezer Stadium ===
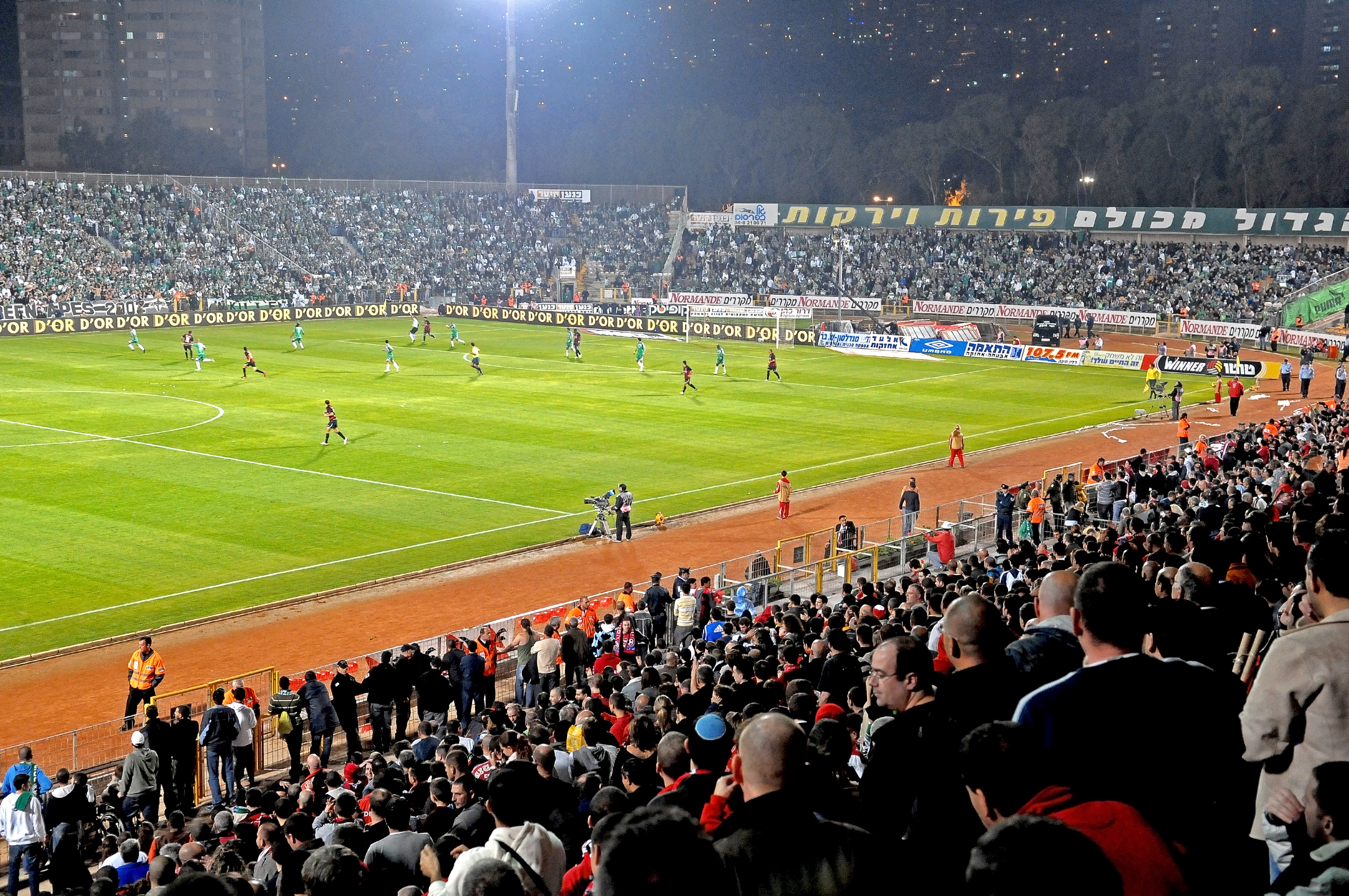
Kiryat Eliezer during derby match against Hapoel Haifa

Maccabi Haifa originally played in Kiryat Haim, which is the main training grounds of Hapoel Haifa. In 1955, a gift from the Italian Labour Union was a football pitch in the heart of the city of Haifa, which would become the new home of Maccabi Haifa. The opening match was a Haifa derby, won by Maccabi Haifa 4–1 over Hapoel Haifa.

Kiryat Eliezer missed out on staging a historic event when Maccabi Haifa reached the group stage of the UEFA Champions League. It was the first time an Israeli club had made it that far in the competition, though the lucrative gate receipts expected to have been made by hosting matches in Israel were lost when UEFA forced Maccabi Haifa to look for an alternative in Europe but outside of Israel because of security concerns. The choice was to host the matches at Neo GSP Stadium in Nicosia, Cyprus. After Israel had increased the security and proved stability, Maccabi Haifa was allowed to play their European matches in the State of Israel. Because Kiryat Eliezer was not up to par with UEFA's demands, the team played their European home matches in Tel Aviv District at Bloomfield Stadium, as well as Ramat Gan Stadium due to the high demand of Maccabi Haifa fans wanting to attend the matches. Finally, Maccabi Haifa was allowed to host European matches at Kiryat Eliezer Stadium. In 2013, Maccabi Haifa played in the Europa League against PAOK (Greece), AZ Alkmaar (Netherlands), and Shakhter Karagandy (Kazakhstan).

On 14 May 2014, the last match was played in the stadium, in which Maccabi Haifa hosted Maccabi Tel Aviv in the Israeli Premier League.

=== Sammy Ofer Stadium ===
Due to the recent success of the club in European competitions, the municipality of Haifa offered the club land by the beach for a brand new stadium at the southern entrance to the city. In the fall of 2008, the final plans were approved. Sammy Ofer Stadium was completed in November 2013. Constructions costs are estimated $135,000,000.00 with a seating capacity of 30,950. The stadium is named after naval-mogul Sammy Ofer, who donated $20,000,000 to build the stadium and the rights to name it after himself. The Sammy Ofer Stadium is developed and built by the Haifa Economic Corporation and managed by Adv. Gal Peleg. It is the home ground of Maccabi Haifa, Hapoel Haifa. It also hosts the international matches of the Israel national football team along with Teddy Stadium.

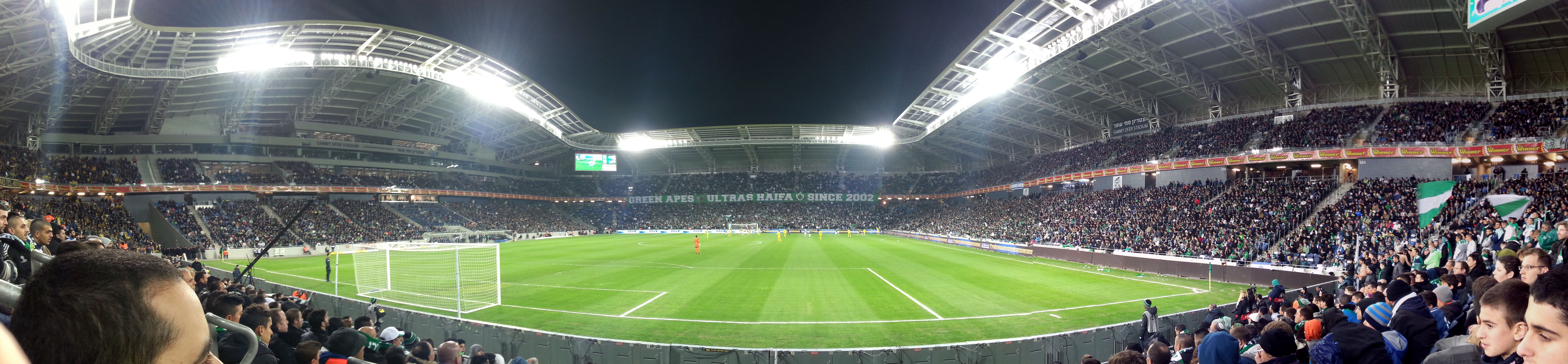
Sammy Ofer Stadium

=== Kfar Galim Training Facility ===
Kfar Galim training facility is a training ground for Maccabi Haifa. It is located in Kfar Galim village.

== Honours ==
=== Domestic competitions ===
==== League ====
- Israeli Championships
  - Winners (15): 1983–84, 1984–85, 1988–89, 1990–91, 1993–94, 2000–01, 2001–02, 2003–04, 2004–05, 2005–06, 2008–09, 2010–11, 2020–21, 2021–22, 2022–23
  - Runners-up (10): 1985–86, 1994–95, 1995–96, 1999–00, 2002–03, 2009–10, 2012–13, 2018–19, 2019–20, 2023–24
- Second Division
  - Winners (4): 1944–45, 1946–47, 1965–66, 1974–75

==== Cups ====
- State Cup
  - Winners (6): 1961–62, 1990–91, 1992–93, 1994–95, 1997–98, 2015–16
  - Runners-up (11): 1942, 1962–63, 1970–71, 1984–85, 1986–87, 1988–89, 2001–02, 2008–09, 2010–11, 2011–12, 2021–22
- Toto Cup
  - Winners (5): 1994, 2002–03, 2005–06, 2007–08, 2021–22
- Israeli Supercup
  - Winners (5): 1962, 1985, 1989, 2021, 2023

=== European competitions ===
- UEFA Champions League
  - Group stage (3): 2002–03, 2009–10, 2022–23
- UEFA Europa League
  - Round of 16 (1): 2006–07
  - Third round (1): 2002–03
  - Group stage (3): 2011–12, 2013–14, 2023–24
- UEFA Europa Conference League
  - Round of 16 (1): 2023–24
  - Group stage (1): 2021–22
- UEFA Cup Winners Cup
  - Quarter-finals (1): 1998–99
  - Second round (1): 1993–94

==== Youth ====
- UEFA Youth League
  - Play-offs: 2016–17
  - Group stage: 2022–23
- Sukkot Cup
  - Winners (1): 1958
- Lilian Cup
  - Winners (1): 1984
- Milk Cup
  - Winners (1): 2004
- Insel Cup
  - Winners (1): 2016

== Records and statistics ==
- Record home win: 10–0 v Maccabi Tel Aviv (1988)
- Record league defeat: 0–9 v Hapoel Petah Tikva (1953)
- Record cup defeat: 1–12 v Beitar Tel Aviv, Israel State Cup, Final (1942)
- Record home attendance: 39,120 v Juventus (2009)
- Most league appearances: 419 Alon Harazi
- Most appearances in one season: 66 Adoram Keise
- Most league goals: 90 Zahi Armeli
- Most league goals in a Season: 28 Alon Mizrahi (Liga Leumit, 1993–94) and Shlomi Arbeitman (2009–10)
- Most goals scored in a Match: 6 Aharon Gershgoren v Ironi Kiryat Shmona (1965)
- Most league goals in a Season: 97 (1993–94)
- Most points in a season: 95 – 39 games (1993–94)
- Most league assists in a season: 16 Eyal Berkovic (1993–94) and Yossi Benayoun (1999–00)
- Most Games without a loss: 46 (throughout 3 seasons) (1993, 1993–94, 1994)
- Most games in a row scoring at least one goal: 39 (1993–94)
- Most away games without losing: 30 (1993–94)
- Least conceded goals per game: 16 goals in 35 games (average: 0.46), Ligat Ha'Al (2009–10)

== Players ==
=== Current squad ===
As of 13 September 2026

No.	Pos.	Nation	Player
1	GK	ISR	Omer Nir'on (on loan from Maccabi Netanya)
2	DF	ISR	Eli Dasa
3	DF	ISR	Sean Goldberg
4	MF	NIG	Ali Mohamed (3rd captain)
7	MF	ISR	Yair Mordechai
8	MF	ISR	Yarin Levi
9	FW	USA	Andrija Novakovich
10	MF	BRA	Bruninho
11	FW	CUW	Kenji Gorré (captain)
16	MF	USA	Kenny Saief
17	DF	ISR	Yinon Feingezicht
18	FW	ISR	Guy Melamed
19	MF	ISR	Ethan Azoulay
21	DF	SUR	Nigel Lonwijk
22	DF	ISR	Zohar Zasno
25	DF	BEL	Jelle Bataille
26	FW	TOG	Silva Kani

No.	Pos.	Nation	Player
27	DF	FRA	Pierre Cornud
29	MF	ISR	Eyad Khalaily
30	MF	POR	Pedro Brazão
31	MF	ISR	Amit Arazi
35	DF	ISR	Noam Sztejfman
36	MF	ISR	Navot Ratner
37	DF	ISR	Elad Amir
38	FW	ISR	Adam Grimberg
39	DF	ISR	Arad Gaist
40	GK	ISR	Shareef Keouf
42	FW	ISR	Liam Luski
44	DF	BRA	Pedrão
45	FW	CIV	Cédric Don
55	GK	ISR	Omri Glazer (vice-captain)
66	DF	BRA	Wenderson Tsunami
90	GK	ISR	Glenn Alvin

=== Out on loan ===
No.	Pos.	Nation	Player
—	DF	ISR	Yabelo Getachew (at (Israel) Hapoel Ramat Gan until 30 June 2027)
—	DF	ISR	Liam Eissat (at (Israel) Hapoel Tirat HaCarmel until 30 June 2027)
—	DF	ISR	Adir Waheb (at (Israel) Hapoel Kfar Saba until 30 June 2027)
—	DF	ISR	Tomi Tsitsuashvili (at (Israel) Hapoel Acre until 30 June 2027)
—	DF	ISR	Tomer Lannes Arbel (at (Israel) F.C. Kiryat Yam until 30 June 2027)
—	DF	UKR	Daniel Joulani (at (Israel) Ironi Tiberias until 30 June 2027)
—	MF	ISR	Itay Solomon (at (Israel) F.C. Kiryat Yam until 30 June 2027)
—	MF	NGR	Peter Agba (at (Hungary) ETO Győr until 30 June 2027)
—	MF	GHA	Dixon Mohammed (at (Israel) Hapoel Afula until 30 June 2027)

No.	Pos.	Nation	Player
—	MF	ISR	Itay Ehud (at (Israel) Hapoel Petah Tikva until 30 June 2027)
—	MF	ISR	Lior Kasa (at (Israel) Maccabi Petah Tikva until 30 June 2027)
—	MF	ISR	Daniel Darzi (at (Israel) Hapoel Kfar Saba until 30 June 2027)
—	MF	ISR	Adi Tzur (at (Israel) Hapoel Kfar Saba until 30 June 2027)
—	MF	ISR	Sarel Cohen (at (Israel) Hapoel Kfar Saba until 30 June 2027)
—	MF	ISR	Hamza Shibli (at (Israel) Maccabi Akhi Nazareth until 30 June 2027)
—	MF	ISR	Jad Shibli (at (Israel) Maccabi Kiryat Ata Bialik until 30 June 2027)
—	FW	JAM	Trivante Stewart (at (Turkey) Gaziantep until 30 June 2027)
—	FW	ISR	Niv Gabay (at (Israel) Ironi Kiryat Shmona until 30 June 2027)
—	FW	ISR	Nehorai Ifrach (at (Israel) F.C. Kiryat Yam until 30 June 2027)

== Retired numbers ==
Note: Flags indicate national team as defined under FIFA eligibility rules; some limited exceptions apply. Players may hold more than one non-FIFA nationality.

No.	Pos.	Nation	Player
6	MF	ISR	Gadi Kinda (2024-2025)
20	FW	ISR	Yaniv Katan (1998–2005, 2006–2014)

=== Captains ===
Years	Captain
1963–77	(Israel) Yisha'ayahu Schwager (DF)
1978–79	(Israel) Oded Baloush (MF)
1979	(Israel) Yaron Persalani (DF)
1979–82	(Israel) Menashe Mizrahi (MF)
1982–83	(Israel) Elisha Levy (MF)
1983–85	(Israel) Baruch Maman (MF)
1985–86	(Israel) Avraham Abukarat (MF)
1991–94	(Israel) Eitan Aharoni (DF)
1994–96	(Israel) Alon Hazan (MF)
1996–97	(Israel) Ronny Levy (MF)
1997–98	(Ukraine) Serhiy Kandaurov (MF)
1998–00	(Israel) Alon Mizrahi (FW)
2000–06	(Israel) Arik Benado (DF)
2006–14	(Israel) Yaniv Katan (FW)
2014–16	(Israel) Yossi Benayoun (MF)
2016–18	(Israel) Dekel Keinan (DF)
2018–19	(Israel) Rami Gershon (DF)
2019–23	(Israel) Neta Lavi (MF)
2023–24	(Suriname) Tjaronn Chery (MF)
2024–25	(Israel) Lior Refaelov (MF)
2025–2026	(Israel) Dolev Haziza (MF)
2026–	(Curaçao) Kenji Gorré (MF)

== Personnel ==
=== Current coaching staff ===
Position	Staff
Head Coach	(Israel) Ran Ben-Shimon
Assistant Coach	(Israel) David Martane
Sporting Director	(Israel) Lior Refaelov
Team Manager	(Israel) Roee Fucs
Physical trainer	(Israel) Lidor Ganon (Israel) Uri Harel (Israel) Gal Vaknin
Goalkeeping Coach	(Israel) Itay Zilpa
Scout	(Israel) Rami Gershon (Israel) Maor Burg

== Youth department ==
=== 2026–27 squad ===
No.	Pos.	Nation	Player
1	GK	ISR	Mark Golankov
2	DF	ISR	Eylon Baruch
4	DF	ISR	Arad Gaist *
5	MF	ISR	Noam Goldenberg
6	MF	ISR	Dor Goldstein
7	MF	ISR	Liel Negat
9	FW	ISR	Adam Grimberg *
10	MF	ISR	Noam Alok
11	MF	ISR	Liam Karagola
12	DF	ISR	Artem Demchuk
13	DF	ISR	Kamal Hino
14	MF	ISR	Omer Kanchiorek
16	MF	ISR	Noam Levy
17	DF	ISR	Daniel Hadar
19	MF	ISR	Yahaly Hermony
20	MF	ISR	Ariel Dorra
22	GK	ISR	Miron Turkin

No.	Pos.	Nation	Player
23	DF	ISR	Gilad Litman
24	DF	ISR	Yoel Weinberg
26	FW	ISR	Liam Luski *
27	FW	ISR	Yunes Adana
-	GK	ISR	Roy Amsalem
-	DF	ISR	Noam Sztejfman *
-	DF	ISR	Adam Grimberg
-	MF	ISR	Yotrm Goldstein
-	MF	ISR	Amit Newton
-	MF	ISR	Ilay Roash
-	MF	ISR	Yagel Tarshish
-	MF	ISR	Hen Rokach
-	MF	ISR	Omer Kenzourk
-	MF	ISR	Itay Sulimani
-	FW	ISR	Oran Shuval
-	FW	ISR	Yahli Gur

- * - first team player

=== Current coaching staff ===
Position	Staff
Head coach	(Israel) Adrian Rochet
Assistant Coach	(Israel) Zadok Malka
Physical trainer	(Israel) Dan Bmaman

== Notable players and managers in club history ==
=== Former players ===
For details on former players, see List of Maccabi Haifa F.C. players and Category:Maccabi Haifa F.C. players.

=== Most appearances ===
Rank	Name	Period	Games	Goals
1	(Israel) Alon Harazi	1990–97; 1998-09	495	29
2	(Israel) Yaniv Katan	1998–2005; 2006–2014	440	79
3	(Israel) Arik Benado	1990–94; 1996–2006; 2010–11	399	9
4	(Israel) Avraam Abukarat	1977–93	396	9
5	(Israel) Nir Davidovich	1994–2013	386	0
6	(Israel) Eitan Aharoni	1978–89; 1990–94	368	7
7	(Israel) Yisha'ayahu Schwager	1962–76	360	11
8	(Israel) Aharon Gershgoren	1964–78	334	27
9	(Israel) Baruch Maman	1974–85	303	45
-	(Israel) Yosi Kramer	1974–85; 1988–89	303	

=== Managerial history ===
See also: List of Maccabi Haifa F.C. managers

- (Mandatory Palestine) Yisrael Schwartz (1946–47)
- (Hungary) Taurentauer (1950–52)
- (Austria) Otto Schlefenberg (1952–54)
- (Israel) Eli Fuchs(1954–56)
- (Hungary) Andor Kisch (1956–57)
- (Socialist Federal Republic of Yugoslavia) Ariyeh Koch (1957–59)
- (Czechoslovakia) David Farkash (1959–61)
- (Scotland) Alex Forbes (1961–62)
- (Hungary) Andor Kisch (1962)
- (Austria) Otto Schlefenberg (1962–63)
- (Bulgaria) Vasil Spasov (1963–65)
- Israel Halivner (1965)
- (Israel) Avraham Menchel (1965–69)
- (Israel) Edmond Schmilovich (1969–70)
- (Israel) Jonny Hardy (1970–72)
- (Israel) Avraham Menchel (1972–74)
- (Israel) Ori Weinberg (1974–75)
- (Israel) Shimon Shinar (1975–77)
- (Israel) Moshe Sasson (1977)
- (Israel) Eli Fuchs (1977)
- (Israel) Jonny Hardy (1977–78)
- (Israel) Eran Kulik (1978–79)
- (Israel) Mordechai Spiegler (1979)
- (Israel) Jonny Hardy (1979–83)
- (England) Jack Mansell (1982–83)
- (Israel) Shlomo Scharf (1983–87)
- (Israel) Dror Kashtan (1 July 1987 – 30 June 1988)
- (Israel) Amazzia Levkovic (1988–90)
- (Israel) Shlomo Scharf (1990–92)
- (Israel) Giora Spiegel (1993–98)
- (Israel) Daniel Brailovsky (1 July 1998 – 30 June 1999)
- (Czech Republic) Dušan Uhrin (1999–00)
- (Israel) Eli Cohen (2000)
- (Israel) Avram Grant (1 July 2000 – 30 June 2002)
- (Israel) Itzhak Shum (1 July 2002 – 30 June 2003)
- (Israel) Ronny Levy (30 June 2003 – 22 December 2008)
- (Israel) Elisha Levy (2 April 2008 – 16 May 2012)
- (Israel) Reuven Atar (16 May 2012 – 13 November 2012)
- (Israel) Arik Benado (17 November 2012 – 18 May 2014)
- (Serbia) Aleksandar Stanojević (1 July 2014 – 28 December 2014)
- (Israel) Marco Balbul (28 December 2014 – 30 May 2015)
- (Israel) Ronny Levy (30 May 2015 – 27 July 2016)
- (Israel) Shmulik Hanin (caretaker) (28 July 2016 – 8 August 2016)
- (Netherlands) René Meulensteen (9 August 2016 – 13 February 2017)
- (Israel) Guy Luzon (13 February 2017 – 9 December 2017)
- (Netherlands) Fred Rutten (24 January 2018 – 1 November 2018)
- (Israel) Eli Guttman (8 November 2018 – 3 December 2018)
- (Israel) Marco Balbul (19 December 2018 – 7 July 2020)
- (Israel) Barak Bakhar (8 July 2020 – 29 May 2023)
- (Israel) Messay Dego (30 May 2023 – 26 May 2024)
- (Israel) Barak Bakhar (1 June 2024 – 4 May 2025)
- (Israel) Itai Mordechai (caretaker) (4 May 2025 – 4 June 2025)
- (Argentina) Diego Flores (4 June 2025 – 20 October 2025 )
- (Israel) Barak Bakhar (21 October 2025 – 7 November 2026)
- (Israel) Ran Ben-Shimon (20 November 2026 -)

== See also ==
- Maccabi Haifa F.C. in European football
- Football in Israel
