= Haifa derby =

Football rivalry in Israel

Haifa Derby
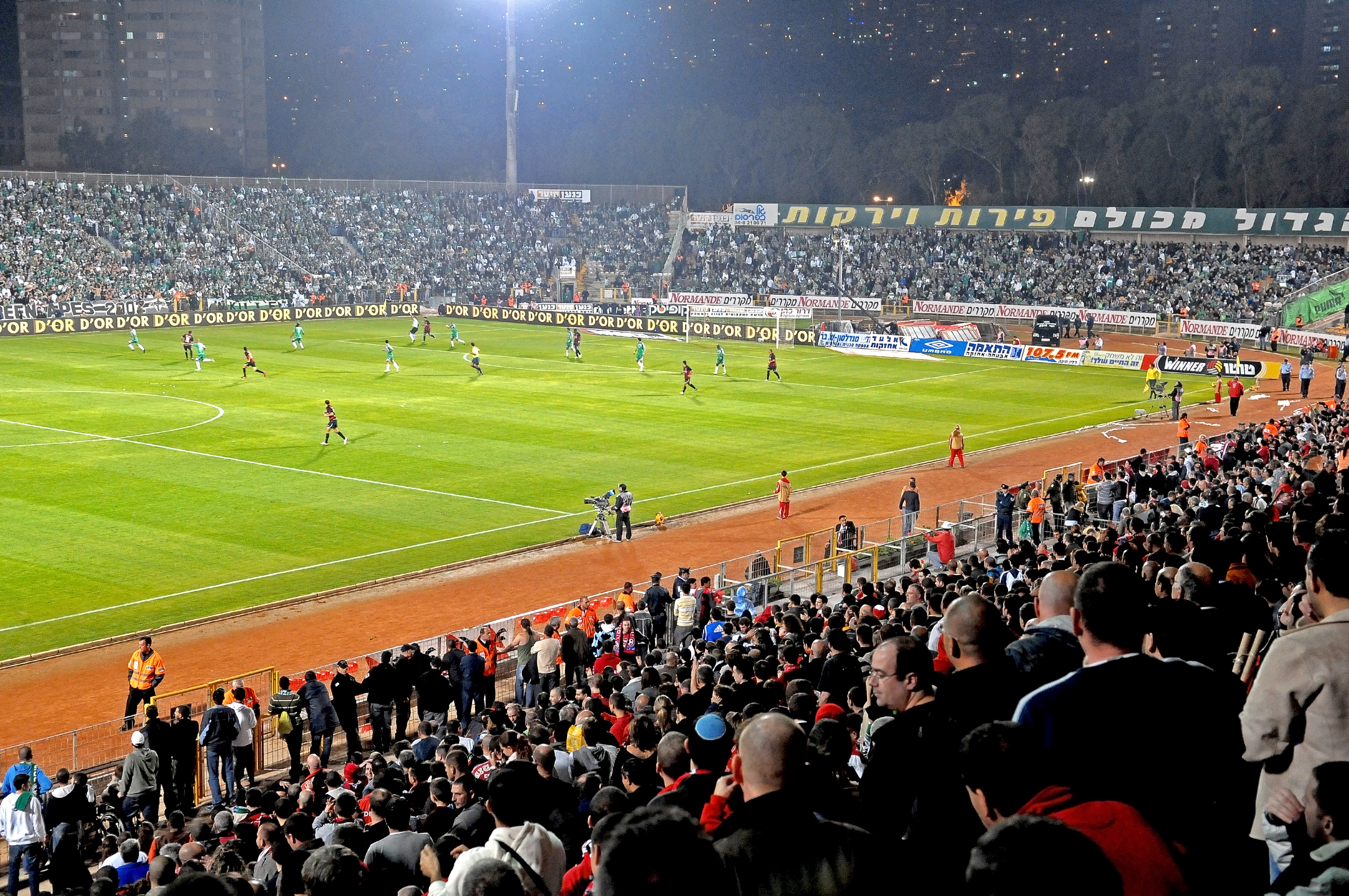
- Kiryat Eliezer Stadium during a local derby
- Location: (Israel) Haifa
- Teams: Maccabi Haifa; Hapoel Haifa
- First meeting: 21 November 1931
- Latest meeting: 25 July 2026 (Toto Cup); Maccabi 2-3 Hapeol
- Next meeting: 5 December 2026 (Ligat Ha`Al)
- Stadiums: Sammy Ofer Stadium, Haifa

Statistics
- Total meetings: 174
- Most wins: Maccabi Haifa (84)
- All-time series: Maccabi: 84; Draw: 44; Hapoel: 46
- Largest victory: Maccabi 0-7 Hapoel (14 May 1932); Maccabi 5–0 Hapoel (21 January 1956); Maccabi 6–1 Hapoel (12 March 1994)

The Haifa derby (Hebrew: הדרבי של חיפה) is the name given to the football matches between Hapoel Haifa and Maccabi Haifa. As with any major football rivalry, gloating and banter between the two sets of fans is commonplace.

This rivalry between those two club has a long history, just like the clubs themselves. Hapoel Haifa was associated with the Israeli Labor Party and a socialist point of view, while Maccabi Haifa was known for middle class fans. In recent years these political differences have almost completely disappeared due to Maccabi becoming a giant in Israeli football by winning fifteen titles since 1984 compared with Hapoel's sole title, which it won in 1999. This can be further evidenced by Hapoel's opening fixture at Sammy Ofer Stadium attracting 3,500 fans while Maccabi's inaugural fixture was a full capacity 30,000.

The first known match between the two teams was played on 22 May 1926 as a friendly match, after the Maccabi and Hapoel organizations reached a cooperation agreement. Hapoel won the match 3–0.

== Full list of results ==
Maccabi win
Hapoel win
Draw

=== IFA League ===
Before the establishment of the state of Israel, both teams played in the first completed league season, meeting twice during the season. However, Maccabi Haifa withdrew from the next season and didn't return to the top division until gaining promotion from Liga Bet in 1947. The teams met once more at the beginning of the following season, which was abandoned due the outbreak of the Israeli war for independence. The league was resumed in 1949 with both clubs in the top division.

#	Date	Season		Stadium	Home team	Away team	Score	Goals Home	Goals Away
1	21 November 1931	1931-1932		Hapoel Stadium	Hapoel Haifa	Maccabi Haifa	4-2		
2	14 May 1932	1931-1932		Maccabi Stadium	Maccabi Haifa	Hapoel Haifa	0-7		
3	22 November 1947	1947-1948	4	Hapoel Stadium	Hapoel Haifa	Maccabi Haifa	5-1	Hegedish [2], Lipman [2], Pinchas	
4	18 June 1949	1949-1950	3	Hapoel Stadium	Hapoel Haifa	Maccabi Haifa	2-0	Hochendorf (29), Handler (85)	Klein
5	22 April 1950	1949-1950	17	Maccabi Stadium	Maccabi Haifa	Hapoel Haifa	1-2	Banudis	Rakuchy, Martin
6	2 February 1952	1951-1952	8	Hapoel Stadium	Hapoel Haifa	Maccabi Haifa	7-1	Orbach (6, 59, 61), Handler (8, 45), Nestfober (9) Neuman (55)	Banudis
7	7 June 1952	1951-1952	17	Maccabi Stadium	Maccabi Haifa	Hapoel Haifa	0-3		Nestfober (23), Bergenstat (27), Handler (29)
8	21 March 1953	1953-1954	2	Hapoel Stadium	Hapoel Haifa	Maccabi Haifa	0-1		Ben Zvi (29)
9	12 December 1953	1953-1954	15	Maccabi Stadium	Maccabi Haifa	Hapoel Haifa	0–1		Fried
10	13 April 1955	1954-1955	10	Hapoel Stadium	Hapoel Haifa	Maccabi Haifa	4-0	Shnyde [2], Shamir, Kramer	
11	24 September 1955	1954-1955	23	Kiryat Eliezer Stadium	Maccabi Haifa	Hapoel Haifa	4-1	Hardy (42), Fuchs (65), Held (70), Tannenbaum (87)	Kramer (24)
12	21 January 1956	1955-1956	8	Kiryat Eliezer Stadium	Maccabi Haifa	Hapoel Haifa	5-0	Hardy (42), S.Levi (60, 86, 88), Almani (72)	
13	21 April 1956	1955-1956	19	Kiryat Eliezer Stadium	Hapoel Haifa	Maccabi Haifa	0-0		
14	1 December 1956	1956-1957	1	Kiryat Eliezer Stadium	Hapoel Haifa	Maccabi Haifa	0-1		Held (25)
15	16 February 1957	1956-1957	10	Kiryat Eliezer Stadium	Maccabi Haifa	Hapoel Haifa	1-4	Held (2)	Ginzburg (36, 50, 58, 80)
16	8 February 1958	1957-1958	7	Kiryat Eliezer Stadium	Hapoel Haifa	Maccabi Haifa	0-1		Shapira (54)
17	26 April 1958	1957-1958	18	Kiryat Eliezer Stadium	Maccabi Haifa	Hapoel Haifa	2-1	Held (2, 24)	Čajkovski (47)
18	10 January 1959	1958-1959	8	Kiryat Eliezer Stadium	Hapoel Haifa	Maccabi Haifa	1-4	Held (12, 87), Shapira (42), Almani (53)	Čajkovski (79)
19	18 April 1959	1958-1959	10	Kiryat Eliezer Stadium	Maccabi Haifa	Hapoel Haifa	1-3	Almani (25)	Nestfober (23), Čajkovski (68), Ginzburg (90)
20	13 February 1960	1959-1960	11	Kiryat Eliezer Stadium	Maccabi Haifa	Hapoel Haifa	1-2	Amar (46)	Levi (40), Ginzburg (43)
21	30 April 1960	1959-1960	18	Kiryat Eliezer Stadium	Hapoel Haifa	Maccabi Haifa	1-1	Čajkovski (35)	Menchel (10)
22	7 January 1961	1960-1961	8	Kiryat Eliezer Stadium	Maccabi Haifa	Hapoel Haifa	3-3	Shapira (20), Shmulevich (35),Menchel (42)	Sasson (55), Blum (62), S.Levi (75)
23	15 April 1961	1960-1961	19	Kiryat Eliezer Stadium	Hapoel Haifa	Maccabi Haifa	4-1	S.Levi (12, 22, 59, 64)	Ben Zvi (63)
24	30 December 1961	1961-1962	8	Kiryat Eliezer Stadium	Maccabi Haifa	Hapoel Haifa	3-1	Menchel (54), Shapira (73), Hardy (85)	S. Levi (3)
25	7 April 1962	1961-1962	19	Kiryat Eliezer Stadium	Hapoel Haifa	Maccabi Haifa	2-0	S.Levi (9, 49)	
26	15 December 1962	1962-1963	8	Kiryat Eliezer Stadium	Hapoel Haifa	Maccabi Haifa	1-2	Menchel (70), Ben Zvi (82)	Young (74)
27	13 April 1963	1962-1963	19	Kiryat Eliezer Stadium	Maccabi Haifa	Hapoel Haifa	0-0		
28	11 January 1964	1963-1964	10	Kiryat Eliezer Stadium	Maccabi Haifa	Hapoel Haifa	1-1	Shmulevich (32)	A.Swissa (o.g. 66)
29	13 June 1964	1963-1964	24	Kiryat Eliezer Stadium	Hapoel Haifa	Maccabi Haifa	2-1	Weinberg (75), R.Young (83)	A.Swissa (63)
30	19 December 1964	1964-1965	11	Kiryat Eliezer Stadium	Hapoel Haifa	Maccabi Haifa	2-0	Englander (1), V.Young (70)	
31	24 April 1965	1964-1965	26	Kiryat Eliezer Stadium	Maccabi Haifa	Hapoel Haifa	1-1	A.Swissa (75)	R.Young (82)
32	25 March 1967	1966-1968	22	Kiryat Eliezer Stadium	Maccabi Haifa	Hapoel Haifa	0-1		Vollach (55)
33	23 September 1967	1966-1968	30	Kiryat Haim Stadium	Hapoel Haifa	Maccabi Haifa	1-1	Gindin (70)	Atzmon (o.g. 78)
34	9 March 1968	1966-1968	52	Kiryat Haim Stadium	Hapoel Haifa	Maccabi Haifa	1-0	Englander (65)	
35	22 June 1968	1966-1968	60	Kiryat Eliezer Stadium	Maccabi Haifa	Hapoel Haifa	0-1		V.Young (44)
36	29 March 1969	1968-1969	22	Kiryat Haim Stadium	Hapoel Haifa	Maccabi Haifa	1-1	Atzmon (77)	Furta (64)
37	21 June 1969	1968-1969	30	Kiryat Eliezer Stadium	Maccabi Haifa	Hapoel Haifa	1-0	Gershgoren (49)	
38	31 January 1970	1969-1970	16	Kiryat Haim Stadium	Hapoel Haifa	Maccabi Haifa	2-1	Goldberg (25), Razon (65)	Hirsh (70)
39	28 March 1970	1969-1970	24	Kiryat Eliezer Stadium	Maccabi Haifa	Hapoel Haifa	1-1	Hirsh (75)	R.Young (44)
40	6 February 1971	1970-1971	16	Kiryat Eliezer Stadium	Maccabi Haifa	Hapoel Haifa	0-0		
41	3 April 1971	1970-1971	24	Kiryat Haim Stadium	Hapoel Haifa	Maccabi Haifa	1-1	Atzmon (33)	Benado (88)
42	26 February 1972	1971-1972	15	Kiryat Eliezer Stadium	Maccabi Haifa	Hapoel Haifa	1-1	Aharonovich (76)	A.Cohen (36)
43	13 May 1972	1971-1972	22	Kiryat Haim Stadium	Hapoel Haifa	Maccabi Haifa	1-2	Gindin (3)	Sharabi (37), Schwager (58)
44	30 September 1972	1972-1973	3	Kiryat Haim Stadium	Hapoel Haifa	Maccabi Haifa	1-2	Sharabi (4), Gershgoren (10)	Vollach (89)
45	17 March 1973	1972-1973	25	Kiryat Eliezer Stadium	Maccabi Haifa	Hapoel Haifa	0-0		
46	8 December 1973	1973-1974	3	Kiryat Eliezer Stadium	Maccabi Haifa	Hapoel Haifa	4-1	Agami (1, 66), Gal (24), M.Mizrahi (58)	Iluz (86)
47	11 May 1974	1973-1974	25	Kiryat Haim Stadium	Hapoel Haifa	Maccabi Haifa	1-2	Alon (13)	Adler (50), Gal (53)
48	24 February 1976	1975-1976	19	Kiryat Eliezer Stadium	Maccabi Haifa	Hapoel Haifa	0-0		
49	12 June 1976	1975-1976	34	Kiryat Haim Stadium	Hapoel Haifa	Maccabi Haifa	2-1	Leventhal (50), Lifshiz (72)	Y.Levy (53)
50	30 October 1976	1976-1977	6	Kiryat Haim Stadium	Hapoel Haifa	Maccabi Haifa	0-0		
51	26 March 1977	1976-1977	21	Kiryat Eliezer Stadium	Maccabi Haifa	Hapoel Haifa	0-0		
52	27 October 1984	1984-1985	6	Kiryat Haim Stadium	Maccabi Haifa	Hapoel Haifa	1-0	Rosenthal (20)	
53	9 March 1985	1984-1985	21	Kiryat Haim Stadium	Hapoel Haifa	Maccabi Haifa	0-0		
54	21 September 1985	1985-1986	2	Kiryat Eliezer Stadium	Maccabi Haifa	Hapoel Haifa	4-0	Armeli (21, 67, 72), Abukarat (27)	
55	15 February 1986	1985-1986	17	Kiryat Eliezer Stadium	Hapoel Haifa	Maccabi Haifa	0-2		Armeli (16), Selecter (61)
56	5 September 1992	1992-1993	2	Kiryat Eliezer Stadium	Hapoel Haifa	Maccabi Haifa	0-3		O.Mizrahi (3, 77), Hetsko (39)
57	12 December 1992	1992-1993	13	Kiryat Eliezer Stadium	Maccabi Haifa	Hapoel Haifa	4-0	Berkovic (28), Hetsko (30, 39, 88)	
58	14 May 1993	1992-1993	32	Kiryat Eliezer Stadium	Maccabi Haifa	Hapoel Haifa	4-1	R.Atar (31, 69), Hetsko (53), Y.Cohen (65)	Banin (37)
59	11 September 1993	1993-1994	3	Kiryat Eliezer Stadium	Hapoel Haifa	Maccabi Haifa	0-0		
60	25 December 1993	1993-1994	16	Kiryat Eliezer Stadium	Maccabi Haifa	Hapoel Haifa	4-0	R.Levi (22, 71), Glam (47), Aharoni (86)	
61	12 March 1994	1993-1994	27	Bloomfield Stadium	Maccabi Haifa	Hapoel Haifa	6-1	Berkovic (16), Harazi (29), Hazan (31), Alon Mizrahi (45), R.Atar (45), Gonen (o.g. 55)	Grishin (65)
62	24 December 1994	1994-1995	14	Kiryat Eliezer Stadium	Maccabi Haifa	Hapoel Haifa	4-0	Kandaurov (25, 76), Ghrayib (65), R.Levi (86)	
63	20 May 1995	1994-1995	29	Kiryat Eliezer Stadium	Hapoel Haifa	Maccabi Haifa	2-3	R.Atar (22, 87)	Shitrit (20, 65), Berkovic (86)
64	16 December 1995	1995-1996	13	Kiryat Eliezer Stadium	Hapoel Haifa	Maccabi Haifa	2-1	R.Atar (32), Amir Turgeman (51)	Kandaurov (72)
65	4 May 1996	1995-1996	28	Kiryat Eliezer Stadium	Maccabi Haifa	Hapoel Haifa	2-0	Harazi (88), Hazan (90)	
66	19 October 1996	1996-1997	6	Kiryat Eliezer Stadium	Maccabi Haifa	Hapoel Haifa	2-1	Kandaurov (19), Shirazi (37)	Banin (90)
67	8 March 1997	1996-1997	21	Kiryat Eliezer Stadium	Hapoel Haifa	Maccabi Haifa	0-2		Amir Turgeman (29), Shirazi (45)
68	6 December 1997	1997-1998	13	Kiryat Eliezer Stadium	Maccabi Haifa	Hapoel Haifa	2-4	Shirazi (75), Alon Mizrahi (82)	Rosso (5), Chulakowiz (18), Basis (35, 60)
69	25 April 1998	1997-1998	28	Kiryat Eliezer Stadium	Hapoel Haifa	Maccabi Haifa	0-1		Alon Mizrahi (45)
70	9 September 1998	1998-1999	2	Kiryat Eliezer Stadium	Hapoel Haifa	Maccabi Haifa	0-0		
71	6 February 1999	1998-1999	17	Kiryat Eliezer Stadium	Maccabi Haifa	Hapoel Haifa	0-1		Talker (4)
72	22 November 1999	1999-2000	12	Kiryat Eliezer Stadium	Maccabi Haifa	Hapoel Haifa	3-2	Benayoun (52, 84), R.Cohen (67)	Amir Turgeman (70), Milanko (73)
73	19 February 2000	1999-2000	25	Kiryat Eliezer Stadium	Hapoel Haifa	Maccabi Haifa	0-0		
74	17 April 2000	1999-2000	33	Kiryat Eliezer Stadium	Hapoel Haifa	Maccabi Haifa	0-4		Cleşcenco (41), Michalski (45, 82), R.Atar (71)
75	23 October 2000	2000-2001	9	Kiryat Eliezer Stadium	Hapoel Haifa	Maccabi Haifa	0-2		Benayoun (11), Cleşcenco (48)
76	6 January 2001	2000-2001	20	Kiryat Eliezer Stadium	Maccabi Haifa	Hapoel Haifa	0-3		Minteuan (5), Ben Shimon (31), Amir Turgeman (35)
77	2 April 2001	2000-2001	31	Kiryat Eliezer Stadium	Hapoel Haifa	Maccabi Haifa	1-1	Yelyshev (59)	Katan (73)
78	19 May 2001	2000-2001	37	Kiryat Eliezer Stadium	Maccabi Haifa	Hapoel Haifa	1–3	Badir (66)	Turgeman (13, 59), Ghrayib (90)
79	24 November 2001	2001-2002	11	Kiryat Eliezer Stadium	Maccabi Haifa	Hapoel Haifa	2-1	Rosso (5), Yakubu (71)	Talker (28)
80	18 February 2002	2001-2002	22	Kiryat Eliezer Stadium	Hapoel Haifa	Maccabi Haifa	1-2	Ziv (84)	Rosso (54), Badir (90)
81	4 May 2002	2001-2002	31	Kiryat Eliezer Stadium	Hapoel Haifa	Maccabi Haifa	0-2		Yakubu (65), R.Cohen (84)
82	7 November 2004	2004-2005	9	Kiryat Eliezer Stadium	Hapoel Haifa	Maccabi Haifa	1-4	Hasarma (65)	Tal (10), Barda (20, 69), Katan (90)
83	5 February 2005	2004-2005	20	Kiryat Eliezer Stadium	Maccabi Haifa	Hapoel Haifa	3-0	Yoveladyo (o.g. 10), Tal (41, 77)	
84	26 February 2005	2004-2005	23	Kiryat Eliezer Stadium	Maccabi Haifa	Hapoel Haifa	2-1	Colautti (9, 78)	Tutuana (38)
85	28 December 2009	2009-2010	15	Kiryat Eliezer Stadium	Hapoel Haifa	Maccabi Haifa	0-1		Golasa (33)
86	10 April 2010	2009-2010	30	Kiryat Eliezer Stadium	Maccabi Haifa	Hapoel Haifa	0-0		
87	22 November 2010	2010-2011	11	Kiryat Eliezer Stadium	Maccabi Haifa	Hapoel Haifa	0-0		
88	14 March 2011	2010-2011	26	Kiryat Eliezer Stadium	Hapoel Haifa	Maccabi Haifa	0-2		Rafaelov (60), Dvalishvili (85)
89	10 December 2011	2011-2012	15	Kiryat Eliezer Stadium	Maccabi Haifa	Hapoel Haifa	1–3	Dvalishvili (22)	Avidor (49, 56), Gluščević (65)
90	17 March 2012	2011-2012	30	Kiryat Eliezer Stadium	Hapoel Haifa	Maccabi Haifa	1-1	Avidor (75)	Cesarec (90)
91	2 December 2012	2012-2013	12	Kiryat Eliezer Stadium	Hapoel Haifa	Maccabi Haifa	0-3		Golasa (59), Amashe (74), Ezra (76)
92	4 March 2013	2012-2013	25	Kiryat Eliezer Stadium	Maccabi Haifa	Hapoel Haifa	1-1	Amasha (18)	Abukarat (74)
93	27 October 2013	2013-2014	7	Kiryat Eliezer Stadium	Maccabi Haifa	Hapoel Haifa	0-1		Korać (13)
94	1 February 2014	2013-2014	20	Kiryat Eliezer Stadium	Hapoel Haifa	Maccabi Haifa	0-1		Alon Turgeman (18)
95	14 December 2014	2014-2015	13	Sammy Ofer Stadium	Hapoel Haifa	Maccabi Haifa	0-4		Benayoun (4), Vered (44), Míchel (75), Abuhatzira (81)
96	14 March 2015	2014-2015	26	Sammy Ofer Stadium	Maccabi Haifa	Hapoel Haifa	2-0	Tawatha (45), Vered (89)	
97	7 December 2015	2015-2016	13	Sammy Ofer Stadium	Hapoel Haifa	Maccabi Haifa	2-4	Stojković (o.g. 5), T.Swisa (17)	E.Atar (41), Ryan (44), Keinan (88), Plet (90)
98	6 March 2016	2015-2016	26	Sammy Ofer Stadium	Maccabi Haifa	Hapoel Haifa	3-2	Plet (17), Jaber (40), Fishler (o.g. 76)	Kiwan (49), Tawatha (o.g. 6)
99	5 November 2016	2016-2017	9	Sammy Ofer Stadium	Hapoel Haifa	Maccabi Haifa	0-0		
100	11 February 2017	2016-2017	22	Sammy Ofer Stadium	Maccabi Haifa	Hapoel Haifa	0-3		Lala (28, 76), Arbeitman (84)
101	4 December 2017	2017-2018	12	Sammy Ofer Stadium	Hapoel Haifa	Maccabi Haifa	1–0	Ginsari (12)	
102	5 March 2018	2017-2018	25	Sammy Ofer Stadium	Maccabi Haifa	Hapoel Haifa	0-3		Mabouka (o.g. 44), Tamaș (55), Alon Turgeman (65)
103	1 December 2018	2018-2019	11	Sammy Ofer Stadium	Maccabi Haifa	Hapoel Haifa	3-1	Tamaș (o.g. 72)	Azubel (14), Vermouth (20, 55)
104	25 February 2019	2018-2019	24	Sammy Ofer Stadium	Hapoel Haifa	Maccabi Haifa	0-0		
105	31 August 2019	2019-2020	2	Sammy Ofer Stadium	Hapoel Haifa	Maccabi Haifa	0-0		
106	24 December 2019	2019-2020	15	Sammy Ofer Stadium	Maccabi Haifa	Hapoel Haifa	3-0	Ashkenazi (46), Rukavytsya (53, 56)	
107	7 June 2020	2019-2020	29	Sammy Ofer Stadium	Maccabi Haifa	Hapoel Haifa	2-2	Rukavytsya (26), Awaed (85)	Serdal (54), Arel (90+5)
108	1 July 2020	2019-2020	34	Sammy Ofer Stadium	Hapoel Haifa	Maccabi Haifa	1-4	Sylvestr (70)	Rukavytsya (4, 23), Sallalich (9, 25)
109	21 November 2020	2020-2021	5	Sammy Ofer Stadium	Hapoel Haifa	Maccabi Haifa	2-1	Zamir (69), Serdal (90+1)	Rukavytsya (84)
110	10 February 2021	2020-2021	20	Sammy Ofer Stadium	Maccabi Haifa	Hapoel Haifa	2-0	Menahem (54), Donyoh (84)	
111	2 December 2021	2021-2022	11	Sammy Ofer Stadium	Maccabi Haifa	Hapoel Haifa	5-1	David (16,45), Haziza (18), Atzili (72), Donyoh (84)	Ožbolt (57)
112	26 February 2022	2021-2022	24	Sammy Ofer Stadium	Hapoel Haifa	Maccabi Haifa	0-1		Chery (19)
113	9 November 2022	2022-2023	12	Sammy Ofer Stadium	Hapoel Haifa	Maccabi Haifa	0-1		Elhamed (o.g, 59)
114	6 March 2023	2022-2023	25	Sammy Ofer Stadium	Maccabi Haifa	Hapoel Haifa	4-1	Atzili (3, 5, 72), Chery (56)	Serdal (69)
115	17 December 2023	2023-2024	9	Sammy Ofer Stadium	Hapoel Haifa	Maccabi Haifa	0-3		Refaelov (4, 58), David (90+1)
116	18 February 2024	2023-2024	22	Sammy Ofer Stadium	Maccabi Haifa	Hapoel Haifa	1-1	Kinda (15)	Yosefi (56)
117	29 April 2024	2023-2024	31	Sammy Ofer Stadium	Hapoel Haifa	Maccabi Haifa	0-2		David (72, 74)
118	25 May 2024	2023-2024	36	Sammy Ofer Stadium	Maccabi Haifa	Hapoel Haifa	0-2		Melamed (45+13, 48)
119	4 November 2024	2024-2025	9	Teddy Stadium	Hapoel Haifa	Maccabi Haifa	1-4	Melamed (52)	Saba (41, 84), Refaelov (72), Severina (90+3)
120	10 February 2025	2024-2025	22	Sammy Ofer Stadium	Maccabi Haifa	Hapoel Haifa	1-1	Refaelov (90+8)	Goldberg (o.g. 55)
121	29 March 2025	2024-2025	28	Sammy Ofer Stadium	Hapoel Haifa	Maccabi Haifa	0-2		Saief (38), Melamed (52)
122	3 May 2025	2024-2025	33	Sammy Ofer Stadium	Maccabi Haifa	Hapoel Haifa	1-5	Melamed (79)	East (12,29,54), Diarra (41,50)
123	21 September 2025	2025-2026	4	Sammy Ofer Stadium	Hapoel Haifa	Maccabi Haifa	1-1	Zikri (33)	Stewart (14)
124	5 January 2026	2025-2026	17	Sammy Ofer Stadium	Maccabi Haifa	Hapoel Haifa	2-0	Azoulay (35), Melamed (45+11)	

=== Israel State Cup ===
#	Date	Season		Stadium	Home team	Away team	Score	Goals Home	Goals Away
1	29 May 1954	1953-1954	Quarter-final	Hapoel Stadium	Hapoel Haifa	Maccabi Haifa	2-1	Neuman (70), Fried (89)	Zvi (75)
2	27 August 1955	1955-1956	Quarter-final	Hapoel Stadium	Hapoel Haifa	Maccabi Haifa	0-4		Georgiou (36), Hardy (38), Held (53), Fuchs (71)
3	8 June 1957	1956-1957	Round of 16	Kiryat Eliezer Stadium	Maccabi Haifa	Hapoel Haifa	1-0	S.Levi (81)	
4	20 May 1961	1961–1962	Fifth Round	Kiryat Eliezer Stadium	Maccabi Haifa	Hapoel Haifa	2-0	Shmulevich-Rom (5, 50)	
5	27 May 1963	1962-1963	Final	Kiryat Eliezer Stadium	Hapoel Haifa	Maccabi Haifa	1-0	Oren (3)	
6	4 June 1966	1965-1966	Semi Final	Bloomfield Stadium	Hapoel Haifa	Maccabi Haifa	1-0	Palgi (67)	
7	26 April 1969	1968-1969	Quarter-final	Kiryat Haim Stadium	Hapoel Haifa	Maccabi Haifa	2-0	Gindin (15), Shapira (85)	
8	20 May 1971	1970-1971	Quarter-final	Kiryat Haim Stadium	Hapoel Haifa	Maccabi Haifa	0-1		Y.Levy (20)
9	13 September 1972	1972-1973	Round of 16	Kiryat Eliezer Stadium	Maccabi Haifa	Hapoel Haifa	3-1	A.Cohen (o.g., 21), Grover (46), Benado (80)	Englander (56)
10	18 March 1978	1977-1978	Round of 16	Kiryat Eliezer Stadium	Maccabi Haifa	Hapoel Haifa	2-0	Loft (1), Haim (72)	
11	30 May 1995	1994-1995	Final	Ramat Gan Stadium	Maccabi Haifa	Hapoel Haifa	2-0	Shitrit (9), Glam (60)	
12	7 March 2000	1999-2000	Round of 16	Kiryat Eliezer Stadium	Hapoel Haifa	Maccabi Haifa	2-2 (Note: Maccabi won by penalty shoot-out)	Talker (22), Amir Turgeman (41)	Keisi (38), Brzęczek (61)
13	9 April 2005	2004-2005	Round of 16	Kiryat Eliezer Stadium	Hapoel Haifa	Maccabi Haifa	3-3 (Note: Hapoel Won by penalty shoot-out)	Tutuana (6, 57), Hasarma (16)	Tal (20), Megrelashvili (45), Dirceu (78)
14	20 April 2011	2010-2011	Quarter-final	Kiryat Eliezer Stadium	Hapoel Haifa	Maccabi Haifa	1-3	Ben Basat (30)	Vered (38), Rafaelov (58, 71)
15	27 February 2013	2012-2013	Round of 16	Kiryat Eliezer Stadium	Maccabi Haifa	Hapoel Haifa	2-1	Alon Turgeman (44), Ndlovu (89)	Aarel (90)
16	27 January 2016	2015-2016	Round of 16	Sammy Ofer Stadium	Maccabi Haifa	Hapoel Haifa	1-0	Plet (5)	
17	6 February 2018	2017-2018	Quarter-finals	Sammy Ofer Stadium	Maccabi Haifa	Hapoel Haifa	2-2	Rukavytsya (11), Sallalich (15)	Alon Turgeman (57), Tamaș (76)
18	1 March 2018	2017-2018	Quarter-finals	Sammy Ofer Stadium	Hapoel Haifa	Maccabi Haifa	1-1 (Note: Hapoel Won by Away goals rule)	Alon Turgeman (44)	Azulay (21)
19	19 May 2022	2021-2022	Semi Final	Bloomfield Stadium	Maccabi Haifa	Hapoel Haifa	2-0	David (43), Chery (51)	
20	4 January 2023	2022-2023	Round of 16	Sammy Ofer Stadium	Maccabi Haifa	Hapoel Haifa	5-1	Lavi (8), Tchibota (18), Seck (77), Atzili (78), David (88)	Buganim (66)

=== Toto Cup ===
#	Date	Season		Stadium	Home team	Away team	Score	Goals Home	Goals Away
1	19 October 1985	1985-1986	Group stage	Kiryat Haim Stadium	Maccabi Haifa	Hapoel Haifa	1-0	Maman (52)	
2	2 November 1985	1985-1986	Group stage	Kiryat Haim Stadium	Hapoel Haifa	Maccabi Haifa	2-0	Amar (60), Rokman (85)	
3	9 October 1993	1993-1994	Group stage	Kiryat Eliezer Stadium	Maccabi Haifa	Hapoel Haifa	3-0	Atar (9), Holtzman (12, 21)	
4	13 August 1994	1994-1995	Group stage	Kiryat Eliezer Stadium	Maccabi Haifa	Hapoel Haifa	0-0		
5	30 November 1994	1994-1995	Group stage	Kiryat Eliezer Stadium	Hapoel Haifa	Maccabi Haifa	3-0	Nir'on (2, 23, 87)	
6	11 February 1997	1996-1997	Semi Final	Kiryat Eliezer Stadium	Hapoel Haifa	Maccabi Haifa	2-1	N.Shitrit (56), Banin (84)	Glam (29)
7	13 August 2002	2002-2003	Group stage	Kiryat Eliezer Stadium	Maccabi Haifa	Hapoel Haifa	1-0	E.Levi (25)	
8	15 January 2003	2002-2003	Group stage	Kiryat Eliezer Stadium	Hapoel Haifa	Maccabi Haifa	1-2	Tubi (19)	Badir (40), Levi (90)
9	7 August 2004	2004-2005	Group stage	Kiryat Eliezer Stadium	Hapoel Haifa	Maccabi Haifa	0-4		Badir (4, 28), Boccoli (37, 73)
10	13 October 2004	2004-2005	Group stage	Kiryat Eliezer Stadium	Maccabi Haifa	Hapoel Haifa	1-0	Roso (3)	
11	14 August 2010	2010-2011	Group stage	Kiryat Eliezer Stadium	Maccabi Haifa	Hapoel Haifa	3-0	Dvalishvili (48), Katan (61), Hemed (74)	
12	10 November 2010	2010-2011	Group stage	Kiryat Eliezer Stadium	Hapoel Haifa	Maccabi Haifa	0-1		Sharon Levi (o.g., 49)
13	6 August 2011	2011-2012	Group stage	Kiryat Eliezer Stadium	Maccabi Haifa	Hapoel Haifa	1-1	Ghadir (34)	E.Levy (15)
14	4 August 2012	2012-2013	Group stage	Kiryat Eliezer Stadium	Maccabi Haifa	Hapoel Haifa	0-0		
15	19 August 2014	2014-2015	Group stage	Netanya Stadium	Maccabi Haifa	Hapoel Haifa	2-0	Rayos (79, 90)	
16	1 August 2015	2015-2016	Group stage	Sammy Ofer Stadium	Maccabi Haifa	Hapoel Haifa	2-1	Alon Turgeman (67), Meshumar (71)	T.Swisa (48)
17	16 August 2016	2016-2017	Group stage	Netanya Stadium	Maccabi Haifa	Hapoel Haifa	1-0	Mugrabi (79)	
18	8 August 2017	2017-2018	Group stage	Sammy Ofer Stadium	Maccabi Haifa	Hapoel Haifa	4-1	Rukavytsya (5, 25), Kahat (59, 63)	Kapiloto (75)
19	20 August 2018	2018-2019	Semi-final	Sammy Ofer Stadium	Hapoel Haifa	Maccabi Haifa	1-1	Zamir (82)	Rukavytsya (73)
20	16 August 2020	2020-2021	Group stage	Sammy Ofer Stadium	Maccabi Haifa	Hapoel Haifa	1-0	Rukavytsya (51)	
21	25 July 2026	2026-2027	Group stage	Sammy Ofer Stadium	Maccabi Haifa	Hapoel Haifa	2-3	Khalaily (75), Azoulay (79)	Gonen (31), Sztejfman (o.g. 33), Turgeman (57)

=== Other Competitions ===
#	Date	Season		Stadium	Home team	Away team	Score	Goals Home	Goals Away
1	19 February 1927	Palestine Challenge Cup	5		Hapoel Haifa	Maccabi-Hagibor Haifa	0-0		
2	26 February 1927	Palestine Challenge Cup	5		Maccabi-Hagibor Haifa	Hapoel Haifa	1-2	? (85)	Epstein (20), Monik (65)
3	21 October 1939	Haifa Municipal League	2		Hapoel Haifa	Maccabi Haifa	3-1		Mandelbaum
4	16 February 1941	Haifa District League	3	Hapoel Stadium	Hapoel Haifa	Maccabi Haifa	2-0	Stern (3, 18)	
5	4 April 1942	Haifa Cup	1	Hapoel Stadium	Hapoel Haifa	Maccabi Haifa	4-1		
6	19 April 1942	Haifa Cup	1	Maccabi Stadium	Maccabi Haifa	Hapoel Haifa	0-4		
7	26 September 1960	Israeli Association Shield	5	Kiryat Eliezer Stadium	Maccabi Haifa	Hapoel Haifa	4-3	Held (58, 70), Shapira (48), Hardy (63)	Alon (o.g., 25), Parselani (50), Čajkovski (81)
8	28 September 1968	Israeli 20th Anniversary Cup	Group stage	Kiryat Eliezer Stadium	Maccabi Haifa	Hapoel Haifa	1-1	Lubezki (90)	Enchi (63)
9	10 October 1968	Israeli 20th Anniversary Cup	Group stage	Kiryat Haim Stadium	Hapoel Haifa	Maccabi Haifa	1-1	Shapira (76)	Furta (75)

== Statistics ==
=== Overall ===
	Matches	Wins		Draws	Goals	
	Matches	Maccabi	Hapoel	Draws	Maccabi	Hapoel
Israeli League	124	57	34	33	191	144
Israel State Cup	20	12	4	4 (Note: Maccabi won one match by penalty shoot-out) (Note: Hapoel won one match by penalty shoot-out) (Note: Hapoel Won one match by away goals rule)	37	18
Toto Cup	21	13	3	5	31	15
Other Competitions	9	1	5	3	9	20
All matches	174	83	46	45	268	197

=== By Stadium ===
Rank	Stadium	Maccbi Wins	Hapoel Wins	Draws	Total
1	Kiryat Eliezer Stadium	51	19	24	94
2	Sammy Ofer Stadium	22	8	9	38
3	Kiryat Haim Stadium	6	5	6	17
4	Hapoel Stadium	2	8	0	10
5	Maccabi Stadium	0	5	0	5
6	Bloomfield Stadium	2	1	0	3
7	Netanya Stadium	2	0	0	2
8	Ramat Gan Stadium	1	0	0	1
8	Teddy Stadium	1	0	0	1

=== Sweeps ===
Season	1st Leg	2nd Leg	3rd Leg
Maccabi
1957-1958	1-0 (A)	2-1 (H)	-
1973-1974	4-1 (H)	2-1 (A)	-
1985-1986	4-0 (H)	2-0 (A)	-
1992-1993	3-0 (A)	4-0 (H)	4-1 (H)
1994-1995	4-0 (H)	3-2 (A)	-
1996-1997	2-1 (H)	2-0 (A)	-
2001-2002	2-1 (H)	2-1 (A)	2-0 (A)
2004-2005	4-1 (A)	3-0 (H)	2-1 (H)
2014-2015	4-0 (A)	2-0 (H)	-
2021-2022	2-1 (H)	1-0 (A)	-
2022-2023	1-0 (A)	4-1 (H)	-

Season	1st Leg	2nd Leg	3rd Leg
Hapoel
1949-1950	2-0 (H)	2-1 (A)	-
1951-1952	7-1 (H)	3-0 (A)	-
2017-2018	1-0 (H)	3-0 (A)	-

== Teams League Position ==
Maccabi	Season	Hapoel
7	1949-1950	3
10	1951-1952	3
8	1953-1954	9
6	1954-1955	9
5	1955-1956	6
5	1956-1957	8
3	1957-1958	7
4	1958-1959	2
5	1959-1960	3
5	1960-1961	3
4	1961-1962	8
9	1962-1963	12
13	1963-1964	6
15	1964-1965	5
-	1965-1966	7
5	1966-1968	3
5	1968-1969	4
3	1969-1970	10
12	1970-1971	6
7	1971-1972	6
11	1972-1973	7

Maccabi	Season	Hapoel
16	1973-1974	6
-	1974-1975	3
9	1975-1976	3
15	1976-1977	9
-	1977-1978	12
-	1978-1979	5
-	1979-1980	12
-	1980-1981	14
7	1981-1982	-
6	1982-1983	-
1	1983-1984	-
1	1984-1985	5
2	1985-1986	15
9	1986-1987	-
9	1987-1988	-
1	1988-1989	-
3	1989-1990	-
1	1990-1991	-
3	1991-1992	-
5	1992-1993	7
1	1993-1994	13

Maccabi	Season	Hapoel
2	1994-1995	13
2	1995-1996	4
5	1996-1997	7
4	1997-1998	3
3	1998-1999	1
2	1999-2000	7
1	2000-2001	3
1	2001-2002	11
2	2002-2003	-
1	2003-2004	-
1	2004-2005	11
1	2005-2006	-
5	2006-2007	-
5	2007-2008	-
1	2008-2009	-
2	2009-2010	11
1	2010-2011	10
5	2011-2012	12
2	2012-2013	9
5	2013-2014	11
5	2014-2015	12

Maccabi	Season	Hapoel
4	2015-2016	12
6	2016-2017	8
10	2017-2018	4
2	2018-2019	11
2	2019-2020	6
1	2020-2021	9
1	2021-2022	11
1	2022-2023	7
2	2023-2024	4
3	2024-2025	5
5	2025-2026	10

== Honours ==
M. Haifa	Competition	H. Haifa
Domestic
15	Israeli Premier League	1
6	Israel State Cup	4
5	Toto Cup	2
5	Israel Super Cup	1
31	Aggregate	8
