= Serhiy Kandaurov =

Ukrainian footballer

Sergay Kandaurov Сергі́й Ві́кторович Кандау́ров
Personal information
- Full name: Sergay Viktorovych Kandaurov
- Date of birth: 2 December 1972 (age 53)
- Place of birth: Zheleznogorsk, Russian SFSR
- Height: 1.75 m (5 ft 9 in)
- Position: Midfielder

Senior career*
| Years | Team | Apps | (Gls) |
| 1990–1993 | Metalist Kharkiv | 35 | (5) |
| 1993–1997 | Maccabi Haifa | 118 | (41) |
| 1997–2001 | Benfica | 67 | (12) |
| 2002 | Metalist Kharkiv | 10 | (0) |
| 2002–2003 | Ashdod | 20 | (1) |
| 2003–2004 | Felgueiras | 2 | (0) |
| 2004–2006 | Helios Kharkiv | 47 | (28) |
| Total | | 299 | (87) |

International career
| 1992–2000 | Ukraine | 6 | (0) |
| 1994 | Russia U-21 | 1 | (0) |

Managerial career
- 2006–2007: FC Helios Kharkiv (assistant)
- 2007–2008: FC Arsenal Kharkiv
- 2009–2010: FC Helios Kharkiv
- 2015: FC Metalist Kharkiv (scout)
Medal record
Men's football
Representing Soviet Union
UEFA European Under-18 Championship
| Winner | 1990 Hungary |
- * Club domestic league appearances and goals

Sergay Viktorovych Kandaurov (Ukrainian: Сергі́й Ві́кторович Кандау́ров; Russian: Сергей Викторович Кандауров; born 2 February 1972) is a retired Ukrainian footballer who played as a midfielder.

A Ukrainian international from eight seasons, he amassed Israel Championship totals of 118 games and 41 goals, winning the league title in 1993–94. In 1997, he moved to Benfica, spending 3 1/2 years in the Primeira Liga adding 67 games and 12 goals. He finished his career in Ukraine, where he started working as a manager in 2006.

== Club career ==
Born in Zheleznogorsk, Kursk Oblast, Russian SFSR, Kandaurov started at Metalist Kharkiv in 1990. Due to his performances, Giora Spiegel brought him to Maccabi Haifa in 1993. In Israel, he grew into a goalscoring midfielder, bagging 10 in his first year, helping Maccabi Haifa win the league title. In his second season, he scored 8 goals in 25 games, but failed to retain the title, winning instead the State Cup. He continued to show his goalscorer abilities in his third year, netting 11 goals in 23 games, but failed to win any silverware. During the 1996 transfer season, Maccabi lost important players like Haim Revivo, Eyal Berkovic, Ofer Shitrit and Alon Hazan, so was time to Kandaurov to lead the team. However, despite scoring 7 goals in 25 games, Maccabi finished in fifth in the 1996–97, his lowest position in 4 seasons.

Midway into his fourth season, Kandaurov received an offer to join Benfica, which he immediately accepted, in a transfer deal reported to be of a million dollars. He made his debut on 3 January 1998, in a match against Porto. He scored a goal but was annulled for apparent hand control, despite his claim that it was a wrong decision: "In that game we were cheated. I did not play with my hand. It was clean." He eventually assumed an important role in a team that finished second in the league. In the following season, his temperament would often conflict with Graeme Souness, and he would be in and out of the starting line-up regularly; he reportedly started a fist fight with Michael Thomas during a training session and in the start of the 1999–2000 season, he professed that "If did not play, he would rather leave Benfica.". Yet, due to his free-kick and goalscoring record, he still attracted attention from other clubs, and was reportedly offered a contract extension in November 2000. In 2000–01, he fell out of the picking order, making only eight appearances throughout the season, being release at the end of the season.

A free player, he was heavily linked to English football, allegedly Aston Villa, Blackburn Rovers, Burnley, and Bolton. However, since none materialized, he opted to return to Metalit Kharkiv. In 2002, he was linked to Maccabi Haifa, but due to the excessive number of foreigners in the team, he signed with smaller Ashdod. His spell was did not see as much success as before, only scoring one in 20 matches. He briefly passed through Felgueiras in 2003, playing only two games, spending the remaining two years of his career at Helios Kharkiv, retiring in 2006. He immediately started a managerial career, spending two seasons at FC Arsenal Kharkiv and one at Helios Kharkiv.

== International career ==
A youth international since 1989, he was part of the squad that won the 1990 UEFA Under-18 with the Soviet Union. An international for Ukraine, he made his debut on 26 August 1992, in a loss against Hungary, making five more appearances in the following eight years, with his last arriving on 31 May 2000, in a match against England. He was not called up for Ukraine from 1993 to 1997 and temporarily switched allegiance to Russia, playing for Russia national under-21 football team in the 1994 UEFA European Under-21 Championship quarterfinal against France. He was also invited to the Russia national football team camp in advance of the 1994 FIFA World Cup, but remained on the bench in a friendly against Slovakia and was not included in the World Cup squad, switching back to representing Ukraine thereafter.

== Career statistics ==
| Club | Season | League | | Cup | | Europe | | Total | |
| Club | Season | Apps | Goals | Apps | Goals | Apps | Goals | Apps | Goals |
|---|---|---|---|---|---|---|---|---|---|
| Maccabi Haifa | 1993–94 | 35 | 10 | 2 | 2 | 6 | 1 | 43 | 13 |
| Maccabi Haifa | 1994–95 | 25 | 8 | 5 | 6 | 1 | 0 | 31 | 14 |
| Maccabi Haifa | 1995–96 | 23 | 11 | 3 | 3 | 4 | 0 | 30 | 14 |
| Maccabi Haifa | 1996–97 | 24 | 7 | 2 | 0 | 2 | 0 | 28 | 7 |
| Maccabi Haifa | 1997–98 | 11 | 5 | 0 | 0 | 1 | 0 | 12 | 5 |
| Maccabi Haifa | Total | 118 | 41 | 12 | 11 | 14 | 1 | 144 | 53 |
| Benfica | 1997–98 | 7 | 1 | 2 | 0 | 0 | 0 | 9 | 1 |
| Benfica | 1998–99 | 22 | 5 | 2 | 0 | 3 | 0 | 27 | 5 |
| Benfica | 1999–00 | 31 | 6 | 2 | 0 | 4 | 1 | 37 | 7 |
| Benfica | 2000–01 | 7 | 0 | 0 | 0 | 1 | 0 | 8 | 0 |
| Benfica | Total | 67 | 12 | 6 | 0 | 8 | 1 | 81 | 13 |
| Career total | | 185 | 53 | 18 | 11 | 22 | 2 | 225 | 66 |

== Honours ==
Soviet Union

- UEFA European Under-18 Championship champion: 1990

Maccabi Haifa

- Israel Championship: 1993–94
- State Cup: 1994–95
