= 1968–69 Israel State Cup =

Tournament details
- Country: Israel

Final positions
- Champions: Hakoah Maccabi Ramat Gan
- Runners-up: Maccabi Sha'arayim

The 1968–69 Israel State Cup (Hebrew: גביע המדינה, Gvia HaMedina) was the 30th season of Israel's nationwide football cup competition and the 15th after the Israeli Declaration of Independence.

The competition started on 14 September 1968 with Liga Bet and Liga Gimel clubs playing the first round. Liga Alef clubs joined the competition in the fourth round, played on 30 November 1968 and Liga Leumit entered on the sixth round, on 12 April 1969.

Hakoah Maccabi Ramat Gan and Maccabi Sha'arayim met in the final, both teams appearing in their first final (although Hakoah Tel Aviv, one of the clubs which were merged to form Hakoah Maccabi Ramat Gan, did appear in the 1935 final). Hakoah emerged the winner by a single goal to claim its first cup.

== Results ==
=== Third Round ===
32 matches were due to be played on 26 October 1968. However, only 21 matches were played and the rest of the matches were given as walkover.

Home team	Score	Away team
Beitar Tiberias	3–1	Maccabi Pardes Hanna
Hapoel Zikhron Ya'akov	3–1	Hapoel Majd al-Krum
Hapoel Givat Olga	3–0	Hapoel Yir'on
Hapoel Tel Hanan	6–4 (a.e.t.)	Beitar Nahariya
Hapoel Nahariya	5–1	Beitar Tel Amal
Maccabi Neve Sha'anan	2–1 (a.e.t.)	Beitar Kiryat Tiv'on
Hapoel Afula	7–3	M.S. Even Yehuda
Maccabi Amidar Netanya	2–0	Beitar Migdal HaEmek
Hapoel Shefa-'Amr	3–1	Hapoel Ramat David
Hapoel Bat Galim	4–3 (a.e.t.)	Beitar Acre
Hapoel Dimona	1–0	HaBira Jerusalem
Hapoel Gedera	5–2 (a.e.t.)	Hapoel HaTzafon Tel Aviv
Hapoel Kiryat Shalom	3–1	Hapoel Ramat HaSharon
Maccabi Bat Yam	6–2	Hapoel Sde Hemed
Hapoel Rosh HaAyin	12–0	Maccabi Ever HaYarkon
Maccabi Ashkelon	3–1	Hapoel Azor
Hapoel Ofakim	1–0 (a.e.t.)	Hapoel Beit Shemesh
Hapoel Bnei Zion	3–1	Hapoel Ganei Tikva
Hapoel Kfar Shalem	3–1	Hapoel Ashdod
Hapoel Ezra	3–2	Maccabi Kiryat Gat
Hapoel Eilat	4–1	Beitar Herzliya

=== Fourth Round ===
Liga Alef clubs entered the competition on this round. As in previous seasons, The draw was set so that Liga Alef clubs wouldn't be drawn against each other.

30 November 1968	Beitar Be'er Sheva	6–1	Hapoel Or Yehuda

30 November 1968	Beitar Lod	5–2	Hapoel Gedera
	Biber 1'; Filus 10', 65'; Livni 62'; Balulu 68'		Lupo 13', 55'

30 November 1968	Beitar Tel Hanan	1–2	Hapoel Kiryat Haim
	Ben-Hamo 32'		Eichner 29'; Shaim 60'

30 November 1968	Hapoel Bnei Zion	1–5	Maccabi Ramat Amidar
	S. Levi ?'		Peltz ?', ?', ?'; Tzarfati ?' (pen.); Rosner ?'

30 November 1968	Hapoel Ofakim	w/o	Maccabi Holon

30 November 1968	Hapoel Eilat	w/o	Sektzia Nes Tziona

30 November 1968	Hapoel Be'er Ya'akov	4–1	Maccabi Bat Yam
	R. Wolfer 13' (63), 75'; Sapozhnik 50' (pen.)		Agiv 48'

30 November 1968	Hapoel Bnei Nazareth	7–4 (a.e.t.)	Beitar Tiberias
	Hana 25', 70', 117' (pen.); Ramzi 66', 80', 100', 105'		Barmali 36', 89'; Dayan 54'; Ezri 58'

30 November 1968	Hapoel Givat Olga	2–4	Maccabi Hadera
	I. Ratzabi 39'; Steisnir 75'		Sabag 9', 19', 52'; Argaman 15'

30 November 1968	Hapoel Herzliya	4–0	Hapoel Bat Galim
	Shtiebelmann 33'; Orbach 60'; Bueno 65', 75'

30 November 1968	Hapoel Holon	2–0	Maccabi Tzafon Tel Aviv
	Fatiha 30'; I. Levi 90'

30 November 1968	Hapoel Tiberias	2–2 (a.e.t.) (2–3 p)	Hapoel Nahariya
	Ya'ish 12'; Nelkabetz ?'		Zeindband 4'; Fartok 32'

30 November 1968	Hapoel Yehud	2–3	Hapoel Kiryat Shalom
	Pesach 3', 83'		Arlandes 8', 10', 58'

30 November 1968	Hapoel Kfar Blum	w/o	Hapoel Tel Hanan

30 November 1968	Hapoel Mahane Yehuda	2–0	Hapoel Givat Haim
	Shemen 43', 63'

30 November 1968	Hapoel Marmorek	3–1	Hapoel Bat Yam
	Skloot 30' (pen.), 66'; Hadad 76'		Pedahzur 22'

30 November 1968	Hapoel Ezra	1–7	Beitar Ramla
	S. Cohen ?'		Izmirli ?', ?', ?', ?'; Vizan ?'; Shemer ?'; Meltzinger ?'

30 November 1968	Hapoel Netanya	3–1	Beitar Dov Vatikim Netanya
	Halfon 35'; Vilner 72'; Bargig 79'		Hadad 15'

30 November 1968	Hapoel Acre	1–0	Hapoel Zikhron Ya'akov
	Rishti 85'

30 November 1968	Hapoel Afula	1–2 (a.e.t.)	Hapoel Nahliel
	Harari 8'		Ya'akobovski 44', 114'

30 November 1968	Hapoel Kiryat Ono	3–2	Hapoel Kfar Shalem
	Stuczynski 2'; Marcheviak 13', 23'		Hizkiah 3'; Ganon 26'

30 November 1968	Hapoel Rosh HaAyin	0–2	Hapoel Lod

30 November 1968	Hapoel Rishon LeZion	8–0	Hapoel Dimona
	M. Cohen 21', 54', 64', 88' (pen.); Levin 63'; Kadousi 78', 83'; Madmoni 89'

30 November 1968	Hapoel Ramla	4–1	Hapoel Sderot
	Nimni 13'; Shriki 27'; Peretz 66'; H. Levi 90'		Ben Hamo 65'

30 November 1968	Hapoel Ra'anana	2–2 (a.e.t.) (4–3 p)	Hapoel Caesarea
	Wygs 8'; Sachar 52'		Suissa 28'; Kakoun 80'

30 November 1968	Maccabi Neve Sha'anan	1–4	Hapoel Hadera
	Agami 42'		Schwartz 20'; Weinberg 39'; Sternfeld 72'; Hershkowitz 85'

30 November 1968	Hapoel Shefa-'Amr	1–3	Beitar Netanya
	Abud 56'		Amos 51'; Dvash 52'; Hadad 89'

30 November 1968	Maccabi Ashkelon	1–3	Hapoel Ashkelon
	Sayag 52' (pen.)		Bukovza 23', 70'; Me'ir 67'

30 November 1968	Maccabi Hashikma Ramat Gan	2–5	Beitar Tel Aviv
	Hadad 1'; Deinisch 31'		Tzvi 8'; Ya'akobi 11'; Hauptmann 43'; I. Ashkenazi 80', 84'

30 November 1968	Maccabi Zikhron Ya'akov	2–2 (a.e.t.) (1–5 p)	Hapoel Kiryat Shmona
	S. Mizrahi 40', 75'		Solomon 30', 60'

30 November 1968	Maccabi Amidar Netanya	0–8	Maccabi Petah Tikva
			Z. Seltzer 16', 18', 22', 43', 75', 80'; Kinstlich 76'; Hibasch 88'

30 November 1968	Shimshon Nahariya	0–3	Maccabi Herzliya
			Kulik 20'; Lenz 39'; Fischbein 60'

=== Fifth Round ===
Most matches were played on 28 December 1968. The match between Hapoel Kiryat Haim and Hapoel Kiryat Shalom was postponed due to weather conditions.

28 December 1968	Maccabi Holon	3–1	Hapoel Bnei Nazareth
	Zilovski 15'; Adler 76'; Ta'izi 81'	Report	Ramzi 22'

28 December 1968	Hapoel Herzliya	w/o	Hapoel Ramla

28 December 1968	Hapoel Hadera	1–0	Beitar Lod
	Ben-Binyamin 21'	Report

28 December 1968	Beitar Tel Aviv	1–0	Hapoel Kfar Blum
	Ashkenazi 57'	Report

28 December 1968	Beitar Ramla	5–1	Hapoel Nahariya
	Israeli 3'; Izmirli 22', 68'; Elfasi 24', 55'	Report	Habibi 76' (pen.)

28 December 1968	Beitar Netanya	0–3	Hapoel Rishon LeZion
		Report	Abramovich 44'; Kadousi 70'; M. Cohen 86'

28 December 1968	Hapoel Holon	7–0	Hapoel Nahliel
	Fatiha 35'; Klein 38', 49'; Lapardon 64', 66', 85'; Springer 80'	Report

28 December 1968	Hapoel Netanya	4–1	Beitar Be'er Sheva
	Smi'a 26'; Gvili 61', 84'; Bargig 87'	Report	Kahlon 69'

28 December 1968	Maccabi Ramat Amidar	3–1	Hapoel Ra'anana
	Peltz 12'; Konstantinovsky 59' (pen.); Tupman 66'	Report	Chirik 32' (pen.)

28 December 1968	Hapoel Kiryat Ono	0–5	Maccabi Petah Tikva
		Report	Feinberg 15'; Z. Seltzer 24'; Kinstlich 62', 75'; I. Seltzer 84'

28 December 1968	Hapoel Acre	3–4 (a.e.t.)	Hapoel Marmorek
	Blum 15', 98'; Barami 48'	Report	Shar'abi 35', 118'; Mikchol 38'; Levi 117'

28 December 1968	Hapoel Be'er Ya'akov	4–2	Maccabi Hadera
	Marcus 6'; Sapozhnik 48', 83'; Wolfer 59'	Report	Itah 11'; Bachar 13'

28 December 1968	Maccabi Herzliya	1–1 (a.e.t.) (4–3 p)	Hapoel Ashkelon
	Lindner 47'	Report	Amar 89'
	Penalties
	Mishon (penalty scored); Furman (penalty scored); Lindner (penalty scored); Flatkevich (penalty missed); Mesika (penalty missed); Fischbein (penalty scored)		(penalty scored) G. Bukobza; (penalty scored) Amar; (penalty scored) Rubel; (penalty missed) Wilkomirski; (penalty missed) A. Levi; (penalty missed) D. Bukobza

28 December 1968	Sektzia Nes Tziona	3–2	Hapoel Mahane Yehuda
	Ben-Shimon 7'; Stifter 37'; Zwieg 58'	Report	Hormann 20', 67'

28 December 1968	Hapoel Kiryat Shmona	3–3 (a.e.t.) (4–5 p)	Hapoel Lod
		Report

4 March 1969	Hapoel Kiryat Haim	5–2	Hapoel Kiryat Shalom
	Romano 32'; Gruber 42'; Ben-Ezra 62', 78'; Lind 65'	Report	Ben-Moshe 53'; Elkayam 86' (pen.)

=== Sixth Round ===
Liga Leumit clubs entered the competition in this round. The IFA arranged the draw so each Liga Leumit clubs wouldn't be drawn to play each other.

12 April 1969	Hapoel Tel Aviv	5–1	Maccabi Holon	Bloomfield Stadium
	Feigenbaum 10', 12'; Chazom 42'; Nurieli 60'; Mordechovich 77'		Guttman 45'	Attendance: 3000; Referee: Uziel

12 April 1969	Hapoel Hadera	0–1	Maccabi Tel Aviv
			Bar-Nur 88'	Attendance: 3000; Referee: Shimon Mizrahi

12 April 1969	Maccabi Petah Tikva	3–1	Shimshon Tel Aviv
	Kinstlich 4'; Spokoiny 20'; Hibasch 65'		Numa 71'	Attendance: 2000; Referee: Klein

12 April 1969	Hakoah Maccabi Ramat Gan	3–1	Hapoel Herzliya	Maccabiah Stadium
	Shaharbani 48', 61'; Sha'uli 86'		I. Levi 52'	Attendance: 1500; Referee: Rubinstein

12 April 1969	Hapoel Marmorek	1–0	Beitar Jerusalem
	Shar'abi ?'			Attendance: 1200; Referee: Sandler

12 April 1969	Sektzia Nes Tziona	4–1	Maccabi Jaffa
	Ben-Shimon 28'; Zweig 58'; Stifter 67'; Iris 75'		Pessi 45'	Attendance: 1000; Referee: Avraham Cohen

12 April 1969	Maccabi Sha'arayim	4–1	Beitar Ramla
	Gibbs 8', 9'; Levi 25', 35'		Vizan 43'	Attendance: 2000; Referee: Sharm

12 April 1969	Hapoel Rishon LeZion	2–0	Hapoel Ramat Gan
			Abramovich 27'; Hillman 62'	Attendance: 3000; Referee: Prohaski

12 April 1969	Hapoel Petah Tikva	2–1	Hapoel Netanya
	Druker 40'; Bachar 58'		Danino 78'	Attendance: 2000; Referee: David Cohen

12 April 1969	Hapoel Kiryat Haim	0–5	Hapoel Haifa
			Vollach 22', 69'; Shapira 25'; Piker 40' (pen.); Razin 78'	Attendance: 1500; Referee: Hoze

12 April 1969	Beitar Tel Aviv	0–1	Hapoel Jerusalem
			Singel ?'	Attendance: 2500; Referee: Handwerg

12 April 1969	Maccabi Netanya	5–0	Maccabi Herzliya
	Sarusi 45', 55'; Spiegler 57'; Amira 74' (pen.); Zriker 68'			Attendance: 1000; Referee: Haim Cohen

12 April 1969	Maccabi Ramat Amidar	0–2	Hapoel Be'er Sheva
			Shalgi 21'; Zildati 80' (o.g.)	Attendance: 1500; Referee: Shoshani

12 April 1969	Bnei Yehuda	3–2	Hapoel Holon
	Hazan 12'; Mag'er 36'; Bachar 81'		Lapardon 10', 61'	Attendance: 1000; Referee: Gaon

12 April 1969	Maccabi Haifa	2–0	Hapoel Be'er Ya'akov
	Hazamos 12'; Gershgoren 14'			Attendance: 300; Referee: Ankri

12 April 1969	Hapoel Kfar Saba	0–1	Hapoel Lod
			Ben-Yakar 69'	Attendance: 1200; Referee: Haim Cohen

=== Seventh Round ===
19 April 1969	Hapoel Jerusalem	2–2 (0–4 p)	Hapoel Marmorek
	Singel 32'; Hod 72'		Skloot 16'; Haike 29'	Attendance: 4000; Referee: Yosefson
	Penalties
	Hod (penalty missed); Azulai (penalty missed)		(penalty scored) Skloot; (penalty scored) Y. Levi; (penalty scored) Burnstein; (penalty scored) Halaf; (penalty missed) Haike

19 April 1969	Hapoel Haifa	w/o (Note: The match was abandoned at the 15th minute. After the goal scored by Hapel Haifa, Maccabi Netanya players protested the goal, claiming the match ball was substituted illegally before the throw-in that preceded it. In the ensuing melee, Hapoel Haifa player Mordechay Piker punched Maccabi Netanya player Shraga Bar and was sent off, following by the abandonment of the match. The match was given to Hapoel Haifa.)	Maccabi Netanya
	Gindin 12'

19 April 1969	Maccabi Tel Aviv	3–1	Maccabi Petah Tikva
	Spiegel 14'; Bar-Nur 24'; Karako 31'		Z. Seltzer 81'	Attendance: 4000; Referee: Shoshani

19 April 1969	Maccabi Sha'arayim	3–1	Hapoel Tel Aviv
	Peled 22'; Perahia 54', 79'		Feigenbaum 19'	Attendance: 3000; Referee: Moshe Ashkenazi

19 April 1969	Sektzia Nes Tziona	0–1	Hapoel Rishon LeZion
			Junger 71'	Attendance: 3000; Referee: Maymon Zohar

19 April 1969	Maccabi Haifa	2–1	Hapoel Petah Tikva
	Rotner 13' (pen.); Forte 18'		Sa'id 35'	Attendance: 12000; Referee: Na'aman

19 April 1969	Hapoel Lod	0–3	Hakoah Maccabi Ramat Gan
			Kadosh 59' (pen.); Rubinstein 61', 89'	Attendance: 2500; Referee: Orabi

19 April 1969	Bnei Yehuda Tel Aviv	1–2	Hapoel Be'er Sheva
	Mag'er 49'		Gozlan 26'; Offer 70'	Attendance: 4500; Referee: Lenciano

=== Quarter-finals ===
26 April 1969

Hapoel Marmorek	0–3	Hakoah Maccabi Ramat Gan
		Levi 5' (o.g.); Pyttel 55'; Shaharbani 89'

Attendance: 4500
Referee: Handwerg

26 April 1969

Maccabi Sha'arayim	3–2	Hapoel Be'er Sheva
Perahia 19'; Peled 45'; Dekel 48' (o.g.)		Admon 6'; Numa 88'

Hapoel Rehovot ground
Attendance: 4500
Referee: Klein

26 April 1969

Hapoel Haifa	2–0	Maccabi Haifa
Gindin 15'; Shapira 85'

Kiryat Haim, Haifa
Attendance: 15000
Referee: Aharon Shoshani

26 April 1969

Maccabi Tel Aviv	4–0	Hapoel Rishon LeZion
Shikva 4', 62'; Spiegel 15'; Tabib 89' (o.g.)

Maccabiah Stadium, Tel Aviv
Attendance: 4000
Referee: Moshe Mizrahi

=== Semi-finals ===
3 May 1969
13:00

Maccabi Tel Aviv	0–1	Hakoah Maccabi Ramat Gan
		Shaharbani 5'

Bloomfield Stadium, Tel Aviv
Attendance: 18000
Referee: Klein

3 May 1969
15:00

Maccabi Sha'arayim	1–1 (a.e.t.)	Hapoel Haifa
Mizrahi 30' (o.g.)		Bzozak 83' (o.g.)
Penalties
Sha'ubi (penalty scored); Peled (penalty scored); Akta (penalty scored); Gibbs (penalty scored); Shar'abi (penalty scored)	5–3	(penalty scored) Atzmon; (penalty scored) R. Young; (penalty scored) Tauber; (penalty missed) Shapira

Bloomfield Stadium, Tel Aviv
Attendance: 18000
Referee: Moshe Ashkenazi

=== Final ===
25 June 1969

Hakoah Maccabi Ramat Gan	1–0	Maccabi Sha'arayim
Farkas 15'

Bloomfield Stadium, Tel Aviv
Attendance: 10000
Referee: Shlomo Marin
