= 1998–99 Liga Leumit =

Liga Leumit
- Season: 1998-99
- Champions: Hapoel Haifa; 1st title
- Relegated: Hapoel Tzafririm Holon; Hapoel Beit She'an; Maccabi Jaffa
- Top goalscorer: Andrzej Kubica (21)

The 1998–99 Liga Leumit season began on 22 August 1998 and ended on 29 May 1999, with Hapoel Haifa winning their first championship title ever.

That season had two rounds, each team played the other teams twice. The three teams that were relegated to Liga Artzit were: Hapoel Tzafririm Holon, Hapoel Beit She'an and Maccabi Jaffa.

Two team from Liga Artzit were promoted at the end of the previous season: Hapoel Tzafririm Holon and Maccabi Jaffa. The two teams relegated were Hapoel Ashkelon and Hapoel Be'er Sheva.

== Final table ==
Pos	Team	Pld	W	D	L	GF	GA	GD	Pts	Qualification or relegation
1	Hapoel Haifa (C)	30	22	5	3	66	23	+43	71	Qualification for the Champions League second qualifying round
2	Maccabi Tel Aviv	30	20	3	7	77	32	+45	63	Qualification for the UEFA Cup qualifying round
3	Maccabi Haifa	30	19	3	8	62	24	+38	60	Qualification for the Intertoto Cup first round
4	Beitar Jerusalem	30	17	6	7	67	33	+34	57	
5	Hapoel Tel Aviv	30	15	7	8	45	26	+19	52	Qualification for the UEFA Cup qualifying round (Note: Hapoel Tel Aviv won the Israeli State Cup and was awarded with entry to the UEFA Cup.)
6	Hapoel Petah Tikva	30	13	7	10	54	47	+7	46	
7	Ironi Rishon LeZion	30	12	6	12	58	61	−3	42	
8	Hapoel Kfar Saba	30	11	6	13	47	66	−19	39	
9	Hapoel Jerusalem	30	11	5	14	35	52	−17	38	
10	Maccabi Petah Tikva	30	10	7	13	45	45	0	37	
11	Bnei Yehuda	30	10	6	14	43	51	−8	36	
12	Maccabi Ironi Ashdod	30	9	9	12	40	49	−9	36	
13	Maccabi Herzliya	30	10	5	15	31	42	−11	35	
14	Hapoel Tzafririm Holon (R)	30	8	10	12	35	38	−3	34	Relegation to Liga Artzit
15	Hapoel Beit She'an (R)	30	5	3	22	25	83	−58	18	Relegation to Liga Artzit
16	Maccabi Jaffa (R)	30	2	4	24	15	73	−58	10	Relegation to Liga Artzit

(C) Champions; (R) Relegated

== Results ==
Home \ Away	BEI	BnY	BTS	HHA	HJE	HKS	HPT	HTA	IRZ	MHA	MHE	MIA	MJA	MPT	MTA	TZH
Beitar Jerusalem	—	1–1	6–0	1–1	3–1	4–1	2–0	0–1	2–2	1–1	1–0	4–2	7–1	2–0	1–0	1–2
Bnei Yehuda	0–3	—	3–2	0–3	2–0	3–0	1–2	1–0	1–1	2–0	0–1	1–0	6–1	0–2	0–6	5–1
Hapoel Beit She'an	1–4	2–1	—	0–1	0–5	0–2	2–3	1–3	4–2	2–1	0–1	1–1	2–1	0–3	0–5	1–1
Hapoel Haifa	2–1	3–1	4–0	—	1–0	6–0	1–0	1–0	4–0	0–0	2–0	2–2	3–0	4–0	3–2	3–1
Hapoel Jerusalem	0–3	1–3	3–2	0–1	—	1–2	2–1	1–1	2–1	1–0	1–0	4–2	3–1	1–1	3–2	1–1
Hapoel Kfar Saba	2–3	1–1	2–0	7–3	2–0	—	2–2	0–0	5–2	1–4	1–0	1–0	1–1	3–2	0–5	0–4
Hapoel Petah Tikva	3–2	1–1	7–0	1–2	2–0	4–2	—	2–0	2–3	1–3	2–0	1–1	3–0	1–1	3–2	1–1
Hapoel Tel Aviv	1–0	1–1	1–0	0–0	3–0	3–1	3–1	—	6–1	1–2	2–0	1–0	1–0	3–1	2–0	0–0
Ironi Rishon LeZion	1–1	3–1	6–0	0–4	5–1	2–1	0–1	3–7	—	1–2	2–2	0–0	3–1	2–1	3–2	2–1
Maccabi Haifa	2–4	4–0	4–0	0–1	6–1	4–1	4–0	1–0	3–1	—	3–0	2–1	2–0	4–0	1–2	1–0
Maccabi Herzliya	1–4	3–2	3–1	2–1	0–0	0–1	2–2	1–1	3–2	0–1	—	3–1	3–0	0–2	0–1	0–0
Maccabi Ironi Ashdod	2–1	3–0	2–1	3–2	0–1	1–1	4–1	3–1	0–3	0–0	2–1	—	2–0	2–7	3–3	2–2
Maccabi Jaffa	0–0	0–3	1–1	1–2	0–1	1–4	0–3	0–1	1–4	1–0	1–2	1–0	—	0–4	0–1	0–3
Maccabi Petah Tikva	1–2	1–1	4–0	0–3	0–0	3–1	2–2	3–1	0–0	0–4	0–1	0–1	3–1	—	0–3	1–1
Maccabi Tel Aviv	4–2	2–1	3–1	1–1	4–0	5–0	3–0	1–1	2–1	2–1	3–2	4–0	4–0	0–3	—	4–0
Tzafririm Holon	0–1	3–1	0–1	0–2	3–1	2–2	1–2	1–0	1–2	0–2	3–0	0–0	1–1	2–0	0–1	—

Legend: Blue = home team win; Yellow = draw; Red = away team win.

== Top scorers ==
Rank	Player	Club	Goals
1	(Poland) Andrzej Kubica	Maccabi Tel Aviv	21
2	(Israel) Motti Kakoun	Hapoel Petah Tikva	20
3	(Israel) Amir Turgeman	Maccabi Ironi Ashdod	19
4	(Israel) Yaniv Abargil	Hapoel Kfar Saba	17
4	(Israel) Avi Nimni	Maccabi Tel Aviv	17
4	(Israel) Kobi Refua	Bnei Yehuda	17
4	(Israel) Nir Sevilia	Beitar Jerusalem	17
8	(Israel) Yossi Benayoun	Maccabi Haifa	16
8	(Israel) Ofer Shitrit	Beitar Jerusalem	16
10	(Israel) Nissan Kapeta	Ironi Rishon Lezion	14
10	(Israel) Alon Mizrahi	Maccabi Haifa	14
