= Israeli 20th Anniversary Cup =

1968 20th Anniversary Cup
Tournament details
- Country: Israel

Final positions
- Champions: Hapoel Petah Tikva
- Runner-up: Maccabi Haifa

Tournament statistics
- Matches played: 52
- Goals scored: 155 (2.98 per match)

The 20th Anniversary Cup (Hebrew: גביע עשרים שנים למדינה, also known as the 20th Cup, Hebrew: גביע ה- 20) was a stand-alone cup competition played to celebrate the 20th anniversary of the Israeli Declaration of Independence.

The competition was played at the start of the 1968–69 season, while the national football team was involved in the 1968 Summer Olympics football tournament, and was open to Liga Leumit clubs only. The 16 clubs were divided into four groups of four clubs each, which were played in a double Round-robin tournament. The winner of each group advanced to the semi-finals.

The cup was won by Hapoel Petah Tikva, who had beaten Maccabi Haifa 4–1 in the final.

== Group phase ==
=== Group A ===
| Team | Pld | W | D | L | GF | GA | GD | Pts | MHA | MSH | HHA | HRG |
|---|---|---|---|---|---|---|---|---|---|---|---|---|
| Maccabi Haifa | 6 | 2 | 4 | 0 | 8 | 3 | +5 | 8 | | 3–0 | 1–1 | 2–0 |
| Maccabi Sha'arayim | 6 | 3 | 1 | 2 | 10 | 8 | +2 | 7 | 1–1 | | 3–2 | 3–0 |
| Hapoel Haifa | 6 | 1 | 3 | 2 | 5 | 8 | −3 | 5 | 1–1 | 1–0 | | 0–3 |
| Hapoel Ramat Gan | 6 | 1 | 2 | 3 | 4 | 8 | −4 | 4 | 0–0 | 1–3 | 0–0 | |

=== Group B ===
| Team | Pld | W | D | L | GF | GA | GD | Pts | HBS | HTA | BEI | BnY |
|---|---|---|---|---|---|---|---|---|---|---|---|---|
| Hapoel Be'er Sheva | 6 | 2 | 3 | 1 | 16 | 10 | +6 | 7 | | 4–1 | 7–3 | 1–1 |
| Hapoel Tel Aviv | 6 | 2 | 2 | 2 | 13 | 15 | −2 | 6 | 4–3 | | 3–2 | 2–2 |
| Beitar Jerusalem | 6 | 2 | 2 | 2 | 11 | 13 | −2 | 6 | 1–1 | 1–1 | | 2–1 |
| Bnei Yehuda | 6 | 1 | 3 | 2 | 7 | 9 | −2 | 5 | 0–0 | 3–2 | 0–2 | |

=== Group C ===
| Team | Pld | W | D | L | GF | GA | GD | Pts | HJE | STA | MTA | MJF |
|---|---|---|---|---|---|---|---|---|---|---|---|---|
| Hapoel Jerusalem | 6 | 5 | 1 | 0 | 14 | 3 | +11 | 11 | | 5–0 | 2–1 | 1–0 |
| Shimshon Tel Aviv | 6 | 2 | 2 | 2 | 7 | 11 | −4 | 6 | 0–2 | | 2–0 | 1–0 |
| Maccabi Tel Aviv | 6 | 0 | 4 | 2 | 9 | 12 | −3 | 4 | 2–2 | 2–2 | | 1–1 |
| Maccabi Jaffa | 6 | 0 | 3 | 3 | 6 | 10 | −4 | 3 | 0–1 | 2–2 | 3–3 | |

=== Group D ===
| Team | Pld | W | D | L | GF | GA | GD | Pts | HPT | HKS | MNE | HMR |
|---|---|---|---|---|---|---|---|---|---|---|---|---|
| Hapoel Petah Tikva | 6 | 4 | 1 | 1 | 11 | 4 | +7 | 9 | | 2–3 | 0–0 | 2–0 |
| Hapoel Kfar Saba | 6 | 3 | 1 | 2 | 9 | 9 | 0 | 7 | 0–2 | | 1–0 | 2–1 |
| Maccabi Netanya | 6 | 2 | 1 | 3 | 6 | 10 | −4 | 5 | 1–3 | 3–2 | | 2–1 |
| Hakoah Maccabi Ramat Gan | 6 | 1 | 1 | 4 | 6 | 9 | −3 | 3 | 0–2 | 1–1 | 3–0 | |

== Knock-out Phase ==
=== Semi-finals ===
19 October 1968

| Hapoel Jerusalem | 1–2 | Maccabi Haifa |
|---|---|---|
| Ben Rimoz 70' | | Shmulevich 84', 88' |

Bloomfield Stadium, Tel Aviv
Attendance: 5000
Referee: Handwerg

19 October 1968

| Hapoel Petah Tikva | 2–1 | Hapoel Be'er Sheva |
|---|---|---|
| Sharabi 15'; Hayek 33' (pen.) | | Gozlan 44' |

Bloomfield Stadium, Tel Aviv
Attendance: 8000
Referee: Shoshani

=== Final ===
26 October 1968

| Hapoel Petah Tikva | 4–1 | Maccabi Haifa |
|---|---|---|
| Sharabi 34'; Chazom 37'; Hayek 40'; Sa'id 60' | | Gershgoren 36' |

Bloomfield Stadium, Tel Aviv
Attendance: 7000
Referee: Marin
