= Moshe Agami =

Israeli footballer

Moshe Agami משה אגמי
Personal information
- Date of birth: 1947 (age 78–79)
- Place of birth: Iraq
- Position: Striker

Youth career
- Maccabi Haifa

Senior career*
Years	Team	Apps	(Gls)
	Maccabi Neve Sha'anan F.C.	?	(92)
	Maccabi Hadera	20	(20)
1969–1976	Maccabi Haifa	-	(-)
- * Club domestic league appearances and goals

Moshe Agami (Hebrew: משה אגמי; born 1947) is a former Israeli professional football (soccer) player who is best known for his time with Maccabi Haifa, when he led the club to a 4–1 victory over city rivals, Hapoel, while the majority of players were unavailable, serving in the Yom Kippur War. Agami was also the leading scorer for the club in three different seasons.

== Playing career ==
Agami signed up with Maccabi Haifa only because the bus rides were cheaper than traveling to city rivals, Hapoel. As a member of the youth system, he was part of the generation as such Maccabi Haifa legends as Aharon Gershgoren, Natan Hirsch, Karol Rotner and Mordechai Lubezky. Under the tutelage of Mordechai Martin, then youth team manager, Agami became the captain of the youth side before being called up by Avraham Menchel to the full side.

His draft into the Israel Defense Forces ruined his chances at breaking the first team, so he chose to join Maccabi Neve Sha'anan F.C. of the Liga Gimel in order to keep match fit. Agami guided Neve Sha'anan to promotion with 58 goals in his first season. After another stellar season with Neve Sha'anan, in which he was the league leading scorer, he left the club for Maccabi Hadera of the Liga Alef.

When Edmond Smeilowicz was appointed manager, he decided to bring Agami back to the club. He became known for his "heading" abilities and enjoyed many years with the club until he decided to retire in 1975. After his retirement, he moved to the United States. He quickly returned from the US to help Haifa gain promotion after they were relegated.

== Honours ==
- With Maccabi Neve Sha'anan F.C.:
  - Liga Gimel
- With Maccabi Haifa:
  - Old Liga Alef/Liga Artzit titles: 2
  - 1974/75.
