= 1995–96 Liga Leumit =

Israeli football league season

Liga Leumit
- Season: 1995–96
- Champions: Maccabi Tel Aviv; 17th title
- Relegated: Maccabi Jaffa; Beitar Tel Aviv
- Top goalscorer: Haim Revivo (26)

The 1995–96 Liga Leumit season began on 26 August 1995 and ended on 18 May 1996, with Maccabi Tel Aviv win their second consecutive title.

That season had two rounds, each team played the other teams twice. The two teams that were relegated to Liga Artzit were: Maccabi Jaffa and Beitar Tel Aviv.

Two team from Liga Artzit were promoted at the end of the previous season: Hapoel Kfar Saba and Maccabi Jaffa. The teams relegated were: Maccabi Netanya and Maccabi Ironi Ashdod.

== Final table ==
Pos	Team	Pld	W	D	L	GF	GA	GD	Pts	Qualification or relegation
1	Maccabi Tel Aviv (C)	30	23	5	2	59	16	+43	74	Qualification for the Champions League qualifying round
2	Maccabi Haifa	30	19	9	2	74	31	+43	66	Qualification for the UEFA Cup preliminary round
3	Beitar Jerusalem	30	19	7	4	65	31	+34	64	Qualification for the UEFA Cup preliminary round
4	Hapoel Haifa	30	19	7	4	66	33	+33	64	Qualification for the Intertoto Cup group stage
5	Hapoel Tel Aviv	30	16	6	8	47	28	+19	54	Qualification for the Intertoto Cup group stage
6	Maccabi Petah Tikva	30	13	10	7	43	37	+6	49	
7	Maccabi Herzliya	30	10	6	14	33	37	−4	36	
8	Hapoel Petah Tikva	30	7	15	8	31	40	−9	36	
9	Hapoel Ironi Rishon LeZion	30	8	7	15	25	40	−15	31	Qualification for the Cup Winners' Cup qualifying round (Note: Hapoel Ironi Rishon LeZion was awarded with entry to the Cup Winners Cup as Israeli State Cup finalists.)
10	Hapoel Be'er Sheva	30	6	11	13	32	36	−4	29	
11	Bnei Yehuda	30	7	7	16	46	65	−19	28	
12	Hapoel Kfar Saba	30	8	4	18	29	53	−24	28	
13	Hapoel Tzafririm Holon	30	7	6	17	32	52	−20	27	
14	Hapoel Beit She'an	30	5	11	14	28	49	−21	26	
15	Beitar Tel Aviv (R)	30	6	6	18	30	63	−33	24	Relegation to Liga Artzit
16	Maccabi Jaffa (R)	30	6	5	19	24	53	−29	23	Relegation to Liga Artzit

(C) Champions; (R) Relegated

== Results ==
Home \ Away	BEI	BTA	BnY	HBS	BTS	HHA	HKS	HPT	HTA	IRZ	MHA	MHE	MJA	MPT	MTA	TZH
Beitar Jerusalem	—	3–1	3–2	1–1	4–0	2–1	2–1	6–0	3–2	0–1	0–2	3–0	2–1	3–1	2–0	1–0
Beitar Tel Aviv	0–4	—	1–6	1–6	3–2	0–3	1–1	1–1	0–2	2–0	0–2	2–1	0–0	4–0	0–3	1–2
Bnei Yehuda	1–4	2–2	—	1–0	2–2	3–3	4–1	1–1	1–2	1–1	0–3	3–2	1–1	1–4	2–3	3–2
Hapoel Be'er Sheva	0–0	1–2	1–1	—	3–1	0–1	4–0	0–0	0–1	3–0	1–1	1–1	0–0	0–1	1–3	0–1
Hapoel Beit She'an	2–2	1–1	2–1	2–1	—	1–1	1–1	0–2	1–0	2–1	0–6	1–2	2–0	0–1	0–1	1–1
Hapoel Haifa	3–3	2–1	4–2	3–2	3–1	—	2–0	1–1	2–1	1–1	2–1	1–0	4–0	2–0	3–0	4–1
Hapoel Kfar Saba	1–2	1–4	0–1	1–0	2–1	0–3	—	0–1	1–0	1–2	0–1		4–1	0–3	1–2	3–0
Hapoel Petah Tikva	2–2	0–0	2–3	0–0	1–1	2–4	3–1	—	1–1	2–0	3–3	0–0	3–1	1–1	0–2	1–0
Hapoel Tel Aviv	4–0	1–0	3–0	3–2	0–0	1–4	5–0	0–0	—	2–1	1–3	1–0	4–2	0–0	0–2	1–0
Ironi Rishon LeZion	0–2	2–0	2–0	1–1	1–1	0–2	2–2	0–0	0–1	—	0–3	2–1	1–0	0–2	1–2	1–2
Maccabi Haifa	2–2	6–3	2–0	3–0	1–1	2–0	3–1	4–1	4–3	2–0	—	2–0	3–1	1–1	1–3	2–1
Maccabi Herzliya	2–3	3–0	1–0	1–1	3–0	2–2	1–0	2–0	0–2	1–0	1–1	—	3–2	1–4	1–1	0–1
Maccabi Jaffa	0–3	1–0	1–0	0–1	1–0	0–1	1–2	0–0	1–1	1–2	1–5	1–0	—	1–2	0–2	4–2
Maccabi Petah Tikva	0–0	3–0	3–1	0–0	2–1	2–1	0–2	3–1	0–4	1–1	2–2	1–2	2–1	—	0–3	0–0
Maccabi Tel Aviv	1–0	2–0	4–1	5–0	0–0	1–0	3–1	3–0	0–0	1–0	2–2	1–0	3–0	0–0	—	1–0
Tzafririm Holon	0–3	2–0	5–2	1–2	2–1	3–3	0–0	0–2	0–1	1–2	1–1	0–2	0–1	4–4	0–5	—

Legend: Blue = home team win; Yellow = draw; Red = away team win.

== Top scorers ==
Rank	Player	Club	Goals
1	(Israel) Haim Revivo	Maccabi Haifa	26
2	(Israel) Reuven Atar	Hapoel Haifa	21
3	(Israel) Alon Mizrahi	Bnei Yehuda	16
4	(Israel) Eli Driks	Maccabi Tel Aviv	15
4	(Russia) Roman Filipchuk	Maccabi Petah Tikva	15
4	(Israel) Ofer Shitrit	Maccabi Haifa	15
7	(Hungary) István Salloi	Beitar Jerusalem	14
8	(Israel) Ronen Harazi	Beitar Jerusalem	13
8	(Israel) Eli Ohana	Beitar Jerusalem	13
8	(Israel) Amir Turgeman	Hapoel Haifa	13
