= 1994–95 Liga Leumit =

Football tournament edition

Liga Leumit
- Season: 1994–95
- Champions: Maccabi Tel Aviv; 16th title
- Relegated: Maccabi Ironi Ashded; Maccabi Netanya
- Top goalscorer: Haim Revivo; Amir Turgeman (17)

The 1994–95 Liga Leumit season began on 27 August 1994 and ended on 27 May 1995, with Maccabi Tel Aviv winning the title.

That season had two rounds, each team played the other teams twice. The two teams that were relegated to Liga Artzit were: Maccabi Netanya and Maccabi Ironi Ashdod.

Three team from Liga Artzit were promoted at the end of the previous season: Hapoel Beit She'an, Hapoel Ironi Rishon LeZion and Beitar Tel Aviv. The team relegated was: Hapoel Kfar Saba.

== Final table ==
Pos	Team	Pld	W	D	L	GF	GA	GD	Pts	Qualification or relegation
1	Maccabi Tel Aviv (C)	30	19	6	5	59	27	+32	63	Qualification for the Champions League qualifying round
2	Maccabi Haifa	30	17	7	6	68	34	+34	58	Qualification for the Cup Winners' Cup qualifying round (Note: Maccabi Haifa won the Israeli State Cup and was awarded with entry to the Cup Winners Cup.)
3	Hapoel Be'er Sheva	30	14	8	8	54	39	+15	50	Qualification for the UEFA Cup preliminary round
4	Hapoel Tel Aviv	30	10	15	5	40	32	+8	45	Qualification for the UEFA Cup preliminary round
5	Hapoel Petah Tikva	30	12	8	10	42	36	+6	44 (Note: Tie-Breaker: Hapoel Petah Tikva won Beitar Jerusalem 1–0 at home, drew 0–0 away.)	Qualification for the Intertoto Cup group stage
6	Beitar Jerusalem	30	12	8	10	42	36	+6	44	Qualification for the Intertoto Cup group stage
7	Hapoel Tzafririm Holon	30	13	5	12	56	56	0	44	
8	Maccabi Petah Tikva	30	7	14	9	40	41	−1	35	
9	Hapoel Ironi Rishon LeZion	30	7	13	10	39	44	−5	34	
10	Bnei Yehuda	30	8	10	12	43	49	−6	34	
11	Beitar Tel Aviv	30	10	4	16	43	60	−17	34	
12	Hapoel Beit She'an	30	8	10	12	30	50	−20	34	
13	Hapoel Haifa	30	8	9	13	45	51	−6	33	
14	Maccabi Herzliya	30	8	9	13	30	49	−19	33	
15	Maccabi Ironi Ashdod (R)	30	7	11	12	42	52	−10	32	Relegation to Liga Artzit
16	Maccabi Netanya (R)	30	7	9	14	33	50	−17	30	Relegation to Liga Artzit

Source: rsssf.com
(C) Champions; (R) Relegated

== Results ==
Home \ Away	BEI	BTA	BnY	HBS	BTS	HHA	HPT	HTA	IRZ	MHA	MHE	MIA	MNE	MPT	MTA	TZH
Beitar Jerusalem	—	1–0	1–3	2–1	1–1	1–0	0–0	0–0	2–1	2–3	8–1	2–1	0–2	2–0	2–1	0–1
Beitar Tel Aviv	0–0	—	1–1	1–2	2–2	1–0	4–3	1–3	1–3	1–0	1–0	0–6	3–1	2–5	1–2	3–4
Bnei Yehuda	4–2	2–3	—	2–1	1–1	2–1	1–3	1–1	3–1	1–3	2–0	3–0	0–0	1–2	1–2	3–2
Hapoel Be'er Sheva	2–1	2–1	3–3	—	3–1	4–2	0–0	2–1	4–2	1–1	4–1	1–1	4–1	0–0	0–1	3–0
Hapoel Beit She'an	0–1	0–6	0–0	1–2	—	0–3	0–4	1–1	1–3	2–2	2–0	1–0	1–0	0–0	2–1	3–2
Hapoel Haifa	2–2	2–2	1–0	3–2	7–0	—	2–0	2–3	0–4	2–3	1–1	2–0	1–3	1–1	1–2	0–1
Hapoel Petah Tikva	1–0	2–0	1–1	1–3	1–0	1–1	—	0–0	0–2	1–2	1–0	2–2	2–0	2–0	2–3	1–1
Hapoel Tel Aviv	2–2	4–2	2–1	1–1	1–1	1–1	0–3	—	1–1	1–0	0–0	2–1	1–0	2–0	0–0	2–3
Ironi Rishon LeZion	1–0	2–1	2–2	0–1	0–1	0–3	0–1	1–0	—	1–1	1–1	3–3	1–1	1–1	1–3	2–5
Maccabi Haifa	3–0	2–3	2–0	3–1	2–3	4–0	3–1	2–2	1–1	—	4–2	2–3	2–1	0–1	0–0	6–0
Maccabi Herzliya	3–1	2–0	1–0	1–0	1–0	1–1	2–2	2–0	0–0	1–4	—	0–2	2–0	1–3	0–0	1–4
Maccabi Ironi Ashdod	2–5	0–1	3–0	0–0	3–2	1–1	1–3	0–3	3–3	1–6	1–1	—	3–0	1–1	1–0	1–1
Maccabi Netanya	0–0	2–0	2–2	3–2	1–1	2–2	1–0	0–0	0–0	1–2	0–1	0–0	—	3–5	1–6	3–2
Maccabi Petah Tikva	0–1	0–1	1–1	3–3	0–0	4–0	1–3	2–2	2–2	1–1	1–0	1–1	0–2	—	0–1	2–2
Maccabi Tel Aviv	0–0	4–0	2–0	1–0	1–0	4–0	4–0	2–4	2–0	0–3	4–4	3–0	2–1	2–2	—	3–1
Tzafririm Holon	1–3	3–1	5–2	1–2	1–3	1–3	2–1	0–0	0–0	0–1	2–0	3–1	5–2	3–1	0–3	—

Legend: Blue = home team win; Yellow = draw; Red = away team win.

== Top scorers ==
Rank	Player	Club	Goals
1	(Israel) Haim Revivo	Maccabi Haifa	17
1	(Israel) Amir Turgeman	Maccabi Ironi Ashdod	17
3	(Israel) Moshe Eizenberg	Beitar Tel Aviv	13
3	(Belarus) Sergey Gerasimets	Bnei Yehuda	13
3	(Israel) Shay Holtzman	Tzafririm Holon	13
6	(Argentina) Claudio Cahimi	Hapoel Beit She'an	12
6	(Israel) Avi Nimni	Maccabi Tel Aviv	12
6	(Israel) Nir Sevilia	Maccabi Tel Aviv	12
6	(Israel) Ofer Shitrit	Maccabi Haifa	12
6	(Israel) Ronen Schweig	Beitar Tel Aviv	12
