= 1996–97 Liga Artzit =

The 1996–97 Liga Artzit season saw Hapoel Ashkelon win the title and earn promotion to the top division for the first time in their history. Ironi Ashdod were also promoted.

At the other end of the table, Hapoel Kiryat Shmona and Hapoel Hadera were relegated to Liga Alef.

== Final table ==
Pos	Team	Pld	W	D	L	GF	GA	GD	Pts	Promotion or relegation
1	Hapoel Ashkelon	30	19	6	5	38	15	+23	63	Promoted to Liga Leumit
2	Ironi Ashdod	30	17	6	7	48	26	+22	57	Promoted to Liga Leumit
3	Maccabi Netanya	30	16	7	7	53	35	+18	55	
4	Hakoah Ramat Gan	30	13	8	9	40	29	+11	47	
5	Hapoel Bat Yam	30	11	10	9	36	28	+8	43	
6	Maccabi Jaffa	30	12	7	11	44	38	+6	43	
7	Maccabi Kafr Kanna	30	11	9	10	33	32	+1	42	
8	Hapoel Ramat Gan	30	9	11	10	29	26	+3	38	
9	Beitar Tel Aviv	30	9	10	11	27	37	−10	37	
10	Maccabi Acre	30	8	12	10	28	29	−1	36	
11	Maccabi Kiryat Gat	30	8	11	11	26	41	−15	35	
12	Hapoel Ashdod	30	8	8	14	29	34	−5	32	
13	SK Nes Tziona	30	8	8	14	30	42	−12	32	
14	Maccabi Yavne	30	9	5	16	26	50	−24	32	
15	Hapoel Kiryat Shmona	30	6	13	11	24	34	−10	31	Relegated to Liga Alef
16	Hapoel Hadera	30	5	11	14	27	42	−15	26	Relegated to Liga Alef

Source: rsssf.com
