= Nir Sivilia =

Israeli footballer

Nir Sivilia ניר סביליה
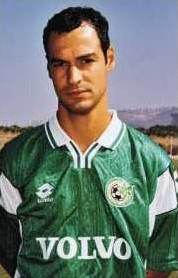
- Sivilia in 2004

Personal information
- Full name: Nir Avraham Sivilia
- Date of birth: 26 May 1975 (age 51)
- Place of birth: Tel Aviv, Israel
- Position: Striker

Youth career
- 1984–1993: Maccabi Tel Aviv

Senior career*
Years	Team	Apps	(Gls)
1993–1995	Maccabi Tel Aviv	59	(21)
1995–1996	Bnei Yehuda Tel Aviv	29	(8)
1996–1997	Maccabi Tel Aviv	11	(2)
1997–1999	Beitar Jerusalem	62	(33)
1999	Hapoel Haifa	8	(2)
1999–2001	Beitar Jerusalem	61	(8)
2001–2003	Maccabi Haifa	28	(7)
2003	Bnei Yehuda Tel Aviv	15	(3)

International career
1993–1997	Israel U21	34	(12)
1998–2000	Israel	13	(1)
- * Club domestic league appearances and goals

Nir Avraham Sivilia (Hebrew: ניר אברהם סביליה; born 26 May 1975) is a former Israeli footballer.

== Honours ==
Maccabi Tel Aviv

- Israeli Premier League: 1994-95
- Israel State Cup: 1993-94
- Toto Cup: 1992-93

Beitar Jerusalem

- Israeli Premier League: 1996–97, 1997–98
- Toto Cup: 1997-98

Maccabi Haifa

- Israeli Premier League: 2001–02
