= 1971–72 Liga Leumit =

Liga Leumit
- Season: 1971–72
- Champions: Maccabi Tel Aviv; 12th title
- Relegated: Bnei Yehuda; Hapoel Hadera
- Top goalscorer: Yehuda Shaharabani (21)

The 1971–72 Liga Leumit season saw Maccabi Tel Aviv win the title, whilst Bnei Yehuda and Hapoel Hadera were both relegated. Yehuda Shaharabani of Hakoah Ramat Gan was the league's top scorer with 21 goals.

== Final table ==
Pos	Team	Pld	W	D	L	GF	GA	GD	Pts	Qualification or relegation
1	Maccabi Tel Aviv	30	18	9	3	45	20	+25	45	Champions
2	Beitar Jerusalem	30	16	9	5	36	15	+21	41	
3	Hakoah Ramat Gan	30	15	9	6	48	27	+21	39	
4	Maccabi Netanya	30	15	7	8	44	29	+15	37	
5	Maccabi Jaffa	30	13	11	6	34	21	+13	37	
6	Hapoel Haifa	30	14	8	8	37	18	+19	36	
7	Maccabi Haifa	30	10	11	9	31	33	−2	31	
8	Hapoel Jerusalem	30	9	10	11	30	32	−2	28	
9	Hapoel Kfar Saba	30	6	15	9	26	32	−6	27	
10	Beitar Tel Aviv	30	9	8	13	21	31	−10	26	
11	Hapoel Petah Tikva	30	8	9	13	24	37	−13	25	
12	Hapoel Be'er Sheva	30	7	11	12	25	39	−14	25	
13	Hapoel Tel Aviv	30	7	10	13	27	37	−10	24	
14	Shimshon Tel Aviv	30	9	5	16	25	39	−14	23	
15	Bnei Yehuda	30	5	9	16	17	41	−24	19	Relegated to Liga Alef
16	Hapoel Hadera	30	3	11	16	13	32	−19	17	Relegated to Liga Alef

Source: rsssf.com

== Results ==
Home \ Away	BEI	BTA	BnY	HAR	HBS	HAH	HHA	HJE	HKS	HPT	HTA	MHA	MJA	MNE	MTA	STA
Beitar Jerusalem	—	2–1	4–0	1–0	3–0	0–0	2–0	1–1	2–0	0–1	1–1	1–0	1–1	3–0	1–3	2–0
Beitar Tel Aviv	0–0	—	0–2	1–1	2–1	0–0	0–4	1–0	1–1	2–1	1–0	3–1	1–0	0–0	0–1	1–0
Bnei Yehuda	0–1	0–2	—	0–1	0–1	1–0	0–2	0–0	1–1	2–2	1–0	0–3	0–1	0–2	0–2	1–1
Hakoah Ramat Gan	1–0	3–0	0–1	—	7–1	3–0	0–0	2–1	2–1	1–0	1–0	3–0	1–1	1–0	2–2	4–0
Hapoel Be'er Sheva	0–1	1–0	1–2	4–4	—	1–0	2–1	2–1	1–0	1–1	2–3	0–0	0–0	0–0	0–0	2–1
Hapoel Hadera	1–2	0–0	2–0	1–1	0–0	—	0–0	0–0	0–2	1–0	1–1	0–0	0–2	0–0	0–1	2–1
Hapoel Haifa	1–1	2–0	1–0	1–0	2–1	2–0	—	1–0	2–0	1–1	3–0	1–2	4–0	3–1	1–0	0–2
Hapoel Jerusalem	0–0	1–0	0–0	1–1	1–0	2–1	1–0	—	0–0	2–0	1–1	1–1	3–1	1–1	1–3	3–1
Hapoel Kfar Saba	0–1	1–0	1–1	0–3	1–1	1–1	1–1	2–0	—	1–0	1–1	1–1	0–1	2–3	1–1	1–1
Hapoel Petah Tikva	0–1	1–0	1–1	0–3	1–0	2–0	0–3	0–1	1–1	—	2–0	1–0	0–0	1–1	2–2	0–1
Hapoel Tel Aviv	0–0	1–1	1–1	2–1	2–2	3–1	0–0	2–0	0–1	1–2	—	3–3	0–1	1–0	1–4	2–1
Maccabi Haifa	1–0	2–1	0–0	0–0	0–0	2–1	1–1	5–3	2–0	0–0	1–0	—	1–1	1–2	1–3	0–2
Maccabi Jaffa	1–0	0–0	4–0	0–1	2–0	1–0	0–0	2–1	1–1	4–1	1–0	0–1	—	0–0	0–0	4–0
Maccabi Netanya	1–1	3–1	4–2	5–0	3–1	1–0	1–0	0–3	2–3	3–1	2–0	3–0	1–0	—	3–1	2–1
Maccabi Tel Aviv	1–2	2–0	1–0	3–0	0–0	2–1	1–0	2–1	1–1	3–0	1–0	2–1	1–1	1–0	—	1–0
Shimshon Tel Aviv	0–2	0–2	2–1	1–1	1–0	1–0	1–0	2–0	0–0	1–2	0–1	0–1	3–4	1–0	0–0	—

Legend: Blue = home team win; Yellow = draw; Red = away team win.
