= Rafi Cohen (footballer, born 1974) =

Israeli former footballer

Rafi Cohen רפי כהן
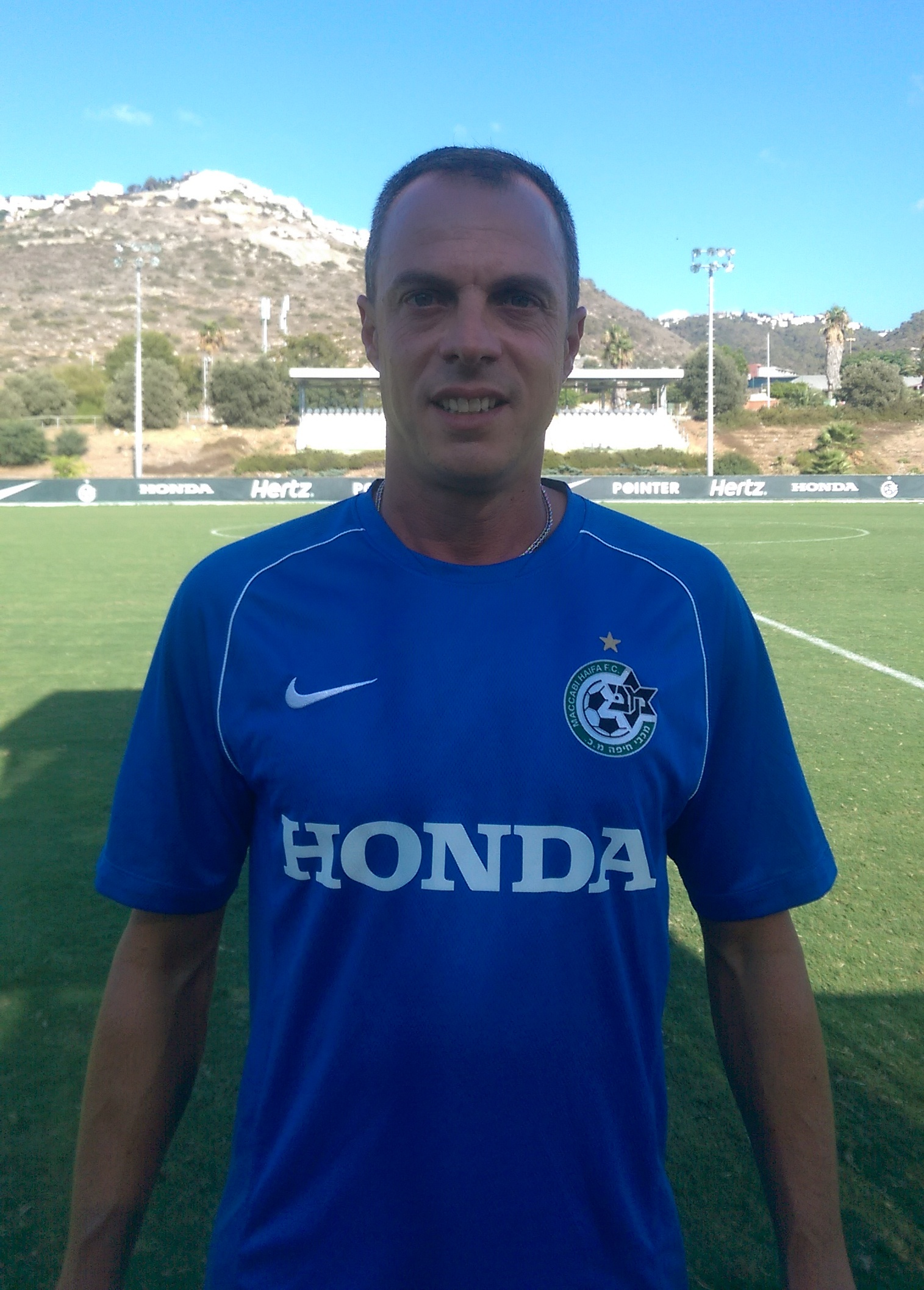
- Rafi Cohen

Personal information
- Full name: Rafi Cohen
- Date of birth: August 21, 1974 (age 52)
- Place of birth: Tirat Karmel, Israel
- Position: Striker

Senior career*
Years	Team	Apps	(Gls)
1993–1995	Maccabi Or Akiva		
1995–1997	Hapoel Karmiel		
1997–1999	Hapoel Ironi Rishon LeZion	59	(21)
1999–2003	Maccabi Haifa	118	(42)
2003–2004	Bnei Sakhnin	28	(6)
2004–2005	Hapoel Acre		
2005–2006	Sektzia Ness Ziona		
2007	Hapoel Bnei Tamra	18	(7)
2007–2008	Hapoel Umm al-Fahm	23	(24)
2008	Ahva Arraba	7	(5)
2009	Hapoel Asi Gilboa	10	(7)
2009–2010	Ironi Umm al-Fahm	22	(4)
2010–2012	Beitar Haifa	28	(6)
- * Club domestic league appearances and goals

Rafi Cohen (Hebrew: רפי כהן; born 21 August 1974) is an Israeli former footballer.

== Honours ==
- Israeli Premier League (2):
  - 2000–01, 2001–02
- Toto Cup (1):
  - 2002–03
- Israel State Cup (1):
  - 2004
- Liga Alef - Northern Division (1):
  - 2007–08
