= 1997–98 Liga Leumit =

Liga Leumit
- Season: 1997–98
- Champions: Beitar Jerusalem; 4th title
- Relegated: Hapoel Be'er Sheva; Hapoel Ashkelon
- Champions League: Beitar Jerusalem
- UEFA Cup: Hapoel Tel Aviv
- Intertoto Cup: Hapoel Haifa
- Cup Winners' Cup: Maccabi Haifa
- Matches played: 240
- Goals scored: 650 (2.71 per match)
- Top goalscorer: Alon Mizrahi (18)

The 1997–98 Liga Leumit season began on 2 August 1997 and ended on 9 May 1998, with Beitar Jerusalem win their second consecutive title.

That season had two rounds, each team played the other teams twice. The two teams that were relegated to Liga Artzit were: Hapoel Ashkelon and Hapoel Be'er Sheva.

Two team from Liga Artzit were promoted at the end of the previous season: Hapoel Ashkelon and Maccabi Ironi Ashdod. The two teams relegated were: Hapoel Tayibe and Hapoel Tzafririm Holon.

== Final table ==
Pos	Team	Pld	W	D	L	GF	GA	GD	Pts	Qualification or relegation
1	Beitar Jerusalem (C)	30	20	9	1	71	33	+38	69	Qualification for the Champions League first qualifying round
2	Hapoel Tel Aviv	30	21	5	4	44	16	+28	68	Qualification for the UEFA Cup first qualifying round
3	Hapoel Haifa	30	17	9	4	59	27	+32	60	Qualification for the Intertoto Cup first round
4	Maccabi Haifa	30	15	7	8	49	34	+15	52	Qualification for the Cup Winners' Cup qualifying round (Note: Maccabi Haifa won the Israeli State Cup and was awarded with entry to the Cup Winner's Cup.)
5	Hapoel Petah Tikva	30	12	6	12	41	41	0	42	
6	Maccabi Tel Aviv	30	10	9	11	42	35	+7	39	
7	Hapoel Kfar Saba	30	10	8	12	39	39	0	38	
8	Maccabi Herzliya	30	9	9	12	37	40	−3	36	
9	Maccabi Petah Tikva	30	8	12	10	27	31	−4	36	
10	Ironi Rishon LeZion	30	10	6	14	42	52	−10	36	
11	Hapoel Jerusalem	30	8	10	12	35	45	−10	34	
12	Maccabi Ironi Ashdod	30	8	9	13	39	57	−18	33	
13	Hapoel Beit She'an	30	8	7	15	35	51	−16	31	
14	Bnei Yehuda	30	8	7	15	26	42	−16	31	
15	Hapoel Be'er Sheva (R)	30	7	9	14	38	57	−19	30	Relegation to Liga Artzit
16	Hapoel Ashkelon (Note: Deducted 2 points.) (R)	30	5	6	19	26	50	−24	19	Relegation to Liga Artzit

Rules for classification: 1) points; 2) goal difference; 3) number of goals scored.
(C) Champions; (R) Relegated

== Results ==
Home \ Away	BEI	BnY	HAS	HBS	BTS	HHA	HJE	HKS	HPT	HTA	IRZ	MHA	MHE	MIA	MPT	MTA
Beitar Jerusalem	—	3–1	5–1	7–2	5–2	0–0	2–1	4–3	4–2	2–1	4–2	1–0	3–2	1–1	1–0	1–1
Bnei Yehuda	0–1	—	0–0	1–1	3–1	1–4	1–1	1–0	2–1	0–1	0–1	0–3	2–3	1–4	0–4	2–0
Hapoel Ashkelon	1–2	0–0	—	2–0	0–0	1–3	1–2	0–1	3–1	2–3	0–2	0–1	0–0	1–0	0–2	1–0
Hapoel Be'er Sheva	2–5	2–0	3–1	—	3–0	4–5	1–1	1–2	0–2	1–4	2–1	1–0	1–2	2–1	1–1	1–1
Hapoel Beit She'an	2–3	2–0	1–3	2–0	—	1–1	3–2	2–1	0–0	0–2	3–1	1–1	3–0	3–1	1–1	0–1
Hapoel Haifa	2–2	1–0	4–1	2–0	5–2	—	3–1	2–0	1–1	2–0	2–0	0–1	1–1	4–0	0–0	2–1
Hapoel Jerusalem	1–1	1–0	3–3	1–0	1–0	0–1	—	0–0	0–1	1–0	2–1	1–1	3–2	2–2	1–1	1–1
Hapoel Kfar Saba	1–0	2–1	2–1	2–2	1–1	1–4	1–2	—	0–1	0–1	0–0	0–2	1–2	2–2	1–0	1–1
Hapoel Petah Tikva	1–1	1–2	2–0	1–2	3–2	0–2	3–2	1–0	—	0–1	2–2	1–4	2–1	4–0	2–0	1–1
Hapoel Tel Aviv	0–1	1–1	1–0	0–0	2–0	2–1	0–0	2–1	1–0	—	6–0	1–0	1–0	3–2	0–0	1–0
Ironi Rishon LeZion	0–3	1–2	1–0	1–1	2–0	2–1	5–1	1–3	2–1	1–1	—	1–2	1–0	1–1	2–3	1–1
Maccabi Haifa	0–0	1–0	4–2	2–0	4–1	2–4	2–1	0–4	2–1	0–1	5–3	—	2–2	0–0	3–1	2–0
Maccabi Herzliya	1–1	0–2	2–0	3–3	0–1	1–1	1–0	1–1	3–1	0–1	3–1	2–2	—	0–1	1–0	2–1
Maccabi Ironi Ashdod	0–4	1–2	2–2	3–1	0–0	1–0	4–2	1–4	2–2	1–2	2–1	2–1	1–0	—	2–3	1–2
Maccabi Petah Tikva	0–1	0–0	1–0	1–1	1–0	0–0	2–1	2–2	0–1	0–2	1–4	1–1	1–1	0–0	—	0–2
Maccabi Tel Aviv	3–3	1–1	2–0	3–0	4–1	1–1	2–0	1–2	1–2	0–3	0–1	2–1	2–1	7–1	0–1	—

Legend: Blue = home team win; Yellow = draw; Red = away team win.

== Top scorers ==
Rank	Player	Club	Goals
1	(Israel) Alon Mizrahi	Maccabi Haifa	18
2	(Israel) Ofer Shitrit	Hapoel Tel Aviv	17
3	(Hungary) István Sallói	Beitar Jerusalem	16
4	(Israel) Yossi Benayoun	Hapoel Be'er Sheva	15
4	(Hungary) István Pisont	Beitar Jerusalem	15
6	(Israel) Eli Driks	Maccabi Tel Aviv	14
7	(Israel) Assi Tubi	Hapoel Jerusalem	13
8	(Israel) Motti Kakoun	Hapoel Petah Tikva	12
8	(Israel) Nir Sevilia	Beitar Jerusalem	12
10	(Israel) Liron Basis	Hapoel Haifa	11
