= Karol Rotner =

Israeli footballer

Karol Rotner קרול רוטנר
Personal information
- Full name: Karol Rotner
- Place of birth: Romania
- Position: Defender

Youth career
- Maccabi Haifa

Senior career*
Years	Team	Apps	(Gls)
1965–1973	Maccabi Haifa	197	(4)
1973	New York Cosmos	3	(0)
- * Club domestic league appearances and goals

Karol Rotner (Hebrew: קרול רוטנר) is an Israeli former professional association footballer who played for Maccabi Haifa and the New York Cosmos.

== Early life ==
Rotner was born in Romania, and immigrated with his family to Israel in 1951 and made aliyah.

== Playing career ==
Rotner made his league debut in a match against Hapoel Ramat Gan on 5 June 1965. In 1973, he played three games for the New York Cosmos of the North American Soccer League.
