= Motti Kakoun =

Israeli footballer

Motti Kakoun מוטי קקון
Personal information
- Full name: Motti Kakoun
- Date of birth: November 16, 1972 (age 53)
- Place of birth: Petah Tikva, Israel
- Height: 5 ft 9 in (1.75 m)
- Position: Striker

Youth career
- Hapoel Petah Tikva

Senior career*
Years	Team	Apps	(Gls)
1991–1999	Hapoel Petah Tikva	203	(94)
1999	CP Mérida	13	(2)
2000–2003	Hapoel Petah Tikva	86	(37)
2003–2005	Hapoel Kfar Saba	57	(21)
2005–2007	Hapoel Petah Tikva	31	(3)
2010	Beitar Petah Tikva	9	(4)
2010–2011	Hapoel Mahane Yehuda	24	(9)
2011	Beitar Petah Tikva	1	(1)

International career
2001	Israel	2	(0)
- * Club domestic league appearances and goals

Motti Kakoun (Hebrew: מוטי קקון; born November 16, 1972, in Tel Aviv) is a retired Israeli footballer mostly known for his time with Hapoel Petah Tikva.

== Football career ==
During his career, Kakoun played mainly for Hapoel Petah Tikva FC. He was appointed team captain at a young age, finishing the 1996–97 season as top league goalscorer, scoring 21 times to help his team finish second, to Beitar Jerusalem FC.

After four more seasons of scoring in double digits for Petah Tikva, twice reaching the 20-goal mark, Kakoun moved abroad, joining Spanish side CP Mérida (second division); however, after only four months, he returned to his country and previous club.

In April 2000, Kakoun reached scored 100th goal in his career, after scoring in a 4–2 derby win over Maccabi Petah Tikva FC. In the 2003 summer, aged 30, he joined second level team Hapoel Kfar Saba FC, playing there for two seasons, and helping it win the league in his second year, with subsequent promotion.

Kakoun moved to Hapoel Petah for a third time in 2005, retiring after two years, with official totals of 156 goals in 379 games.

He returned to play active football in October 2010 for Beitar Petah Tikva and two months later he moved to Hapoel Mahane Yehuda F.C. At 2012 he returned to Beitar Petah Tikva.

== Honours ==
=== Team ===
- Israeli Cup: 1991–92
- Israeli Second Division: 2004–05

=== Individual ===
- Israeli League: Top Goalscorer 1996–97
