= Yochanan Vollach =

Israeli footballer

- Vollach with Israel in 1970

Personal information
- Date of birth: 14 May 1945 (age 81)
- Place of birth: Kiryat Bialik, Mandatory Palestine
- Height: 1.86 m (6 ft 1 in)
- Position: Defender

Youth career
- 1958–1962: Maccabi Kiryat Bialik

Senior career*
Years	Team	Apps	(Gls)
1962–1965	Maccabi Kiryat Bialik		
1965–1977	Hapoel Haifa		
1977–1979	Maccabi Haifa	30	(1)
1985–1990	HKFC		

International career
1968–1971	Israel	12	(1)
- * Club domestic league appearances and goals

Yochanan Vollach (Hebrew: יוחנן וולך, also Jochanan Wallach or Yohanan Wallach, born 14 May 1945) is an Israeli former footballer. He was a member of the Israel national team that competed at the 1970 FIFA World Cup. He is a member of the Israeli Football Hall of Fame.

Vollach is President of the Maccabi Haifa sports organization, and CEO of the Israeli Chamber of Shipping.

== Biography ==
Born in Kiryat Bialik, Vollach began his sports career with his local club, Maccabi Kiryat Bialik. In 1963, he was drafted to the Israel Defense Forces' (IDF) Nahal as an infantry soldier. One of only a handful of professional footballers to serve in active combat in the Nahal, Vollach missed an entire season of football. During his service, he won the IDF football championship in 1965.

In 1965, at age 19, his rights were sold for IL5,000 to Hapoel Haifa. Vollach earned a Bachelor's degree in History & Political Science from the University of Haifa, and a Master's degree in Business Administration from the Hebrew University of Jerusalem. He is a retired Major in the IDF.

== Sports career ==
Originally a striker, because of his height advantage and large build, he was dubbed "The Tank". He was unable to reach his full potential so he was moved to the defender position where he excelled and played til the end of his career.

He won the Israeli Israel State Cup competition twice, in 1966 and 1974, and was close several times to winning Liga Leumit (then the top division). His major achievement was helping the Israel national football team qualify for their first World Cup in Mexico in 1970. At the 1970 World Cup, Vollach played against Uruguay. At the following match, Vollach broke his leg in the second half in a brutal match against the Swedish (1–1) side, and so the dream of man marking Gigi Riva and Gianni Rivera, in the last match against Italy was over. Vollach was twice loaned out to other Israeli clubs to strengthen their rosters for in UI Cup games. The first time was in 1976 with Hapoel Be'er Sheva, and the second in 1977 with Maccabi Tel Aviv, both Israeli title holders.

In the summer of 1976, Vollach was strengthening the rosters for the sole purpose of Intertoto Cup games with title holders Hapoel Be'er Sheva. Before the game against Standard Liège in Belgium, the players were staying at the hotel room. Shalom Avitan, Be'er Sheva's player, fooled around with the .22 Short caliber that was in a box on the table and that belonged to the Shabak agent who was guarding the team (after the Munich Massacre, Israel took no chances). Avitan thought the gun was unloaded and pointed it towards Vollach. His hand was moved in the last second and the bullet passed an inch away from Vollach's head.

In 1977, Vollach transferred from Hapoel Haifa, along with former international player and club captain Yitzhak Englander, to local city rivals Maccabi Haifa.

Vollach is a member of the Education and Publicity Committee of the Israel Football Association and a management member of Maccabi World Union.

=== Maccabi Haifa ===
Vollach served as a role model for young and inexperienced players at Maccabi Haifa. He was looked up to for having been a part of the national side that took part in the World Cup finals. His time at Maccabi was short, playing only two seasons and, in 1979, he retired from professional football and began, fully voluntarily, to act as general manager of Maccabi Haifa. Under Vollach's management Maccabi went from being a mediocre football club to a successful top ranking team, winning their first championship in 1984 and retaining it in 1985, which Maccabi Haifa also finished at the head of the house in the Intertoto home stage. During this time, he began to be known as "the brains of Maccabi Haifa".

=== Hong Kong F.C. ===
In 1985, Vollach was promoted in his job at Zim Integrated Shipping Services, and was sent oversees to become the branch manager and representative of the company's operations in Hong Kong. It was then that he made a return to football, starring at Hong Kong FC.

== Managerial career ==
After five years in Hong Kong, in 1990, Vollach returned to Israel, where former teammate and club captain, Yitzhak Englander was president of Hapoel Haifa. Englander offered him the position of President of Hapoel, but city rivals, Maccabi, were not eager to see Vollach go, so they appointed him as CFO and chief executive of the team. Over the span of three years (1990–93), the club won the "double" (league and cup) during the 1990/91 season and the Israel State Cup at 1993 . Between 1990 and 1994, he volunteered in the management division of the Israel Football Association as well as acting as Maccabi Haifa's representative at the Israel Football Association.

After the football department was privatized, Vollach joined the Maccabi Haifa union's management, filling major positions such as CFO and second to the chairman of board. In 1999, he was voted in unanimously as chairman of the board of the Maccabi Haifa union as well as president of the basketball division of Maccabi Haifa and as a member of the management of the Israel Basketball Association.

== Journalism and media career ==
Aside from his administrative and work roles, Vollach participated for many years as a sports commentator on the popular Israeli sports radio show, Shirim uSha'arim and was a local journalist.

== Business career ==
He began working at Zim in 1970 after returning from the 1970 FIFA World Cup. At his first week he was assigned to go over employees' attendance tickets. Vollach was global services manager of Zim, chairman of the directorate of Zim's ownership companies, and vice president of Zim, and Zim's M.Dizengoff President & CEO. Since 2005, he has been the President & CEO of Newlog, which is a subsidiary of the Zim group, and handles logistic service relating to marine and overland transportation.

== Awards and recognition ==
- Best XI in Israel (3 times, determined by Hadashot haSport and Yedioth Ahronoth)
- Fair play award in Israel (3 times)
- Hapoel Haifa Best XI Alltime
- Elected by official website poll as Hapoel Haifa's greatest player all time
- Israel Golden Jubilee Awards: Haifa Best XI
- Israel Golden Jubilee Awards: Haifa Best Defender (All Time)
- Honorary citizen of the City of Haifa (1993)
- Lifetime contributions special award for the Israeli national team in the 1970 world cup, determined by Yedioth Ahronoth and the Israeli football player association (2007)
- Member of the Israeli Football Hall of Fame (2009)

In recognition of his extensive volunteering to the sporting community as well as business success, he was bestowed with honorary citizenship by the city of Haifa, in 1993.

== Football trophies ==
Maccabi Haifa & Hapoel Haifa:

- 4 x Israeli cup (1966, 1974, 1991, 1993), (1985 runners up)
- 3 x Israeli title (1984, 1985, 1991), (1975 runners up)
- 1 x Israeli Championship of the Champions Cup (1985)
- 1 x Lilian Cup (1984)
- 1 x IDF title (1965)

Maccabi Haifa youth team:

- 4 x Israeli youth title (1979, 1983, 1984, 1991)
- 3 x Israeli youth cup (1980, 1991, 1993), (1981 runners up)
- 1 x Israeli Championship of the Champions Cup (1984)

Maccabi Haifa basketball team:

- 2 x Israeli Final Four
- 1 x Israeli Cup final (2008–2009)

== See also ==
- Football in Israel
- Sports in Israel
- List of select Jewish association football (soccer) players
