= Abba Gindin =

Finnish Israeli footballer (born 1945)

Abba Gindin אבא גינדין
Personal information
- Full name: Abraham Gindin אברהם גינדין
- Date of birth: 1945 (age 80–81)
- Place of birth: Helsinki, Finland
- Position: Striker

Youth career
- Maccabi Helsinki

Senior career*
Years	Team	Apps	(Gls)
1964–1976	Hapoel Haifa		

International career
1973	Israel	6	(0)
- * Club domestic league appearances and goals

Abraham "Abba" Gindin (Hebrew: אברהם "אבא" גינדין; born 24 December 1945 in Helsinki, Finland) is a former Israeli professional football player.

== Early life ==
Gindin was born and raised in Finland and grew up playing ice hockey and football for Makkabi Helsinki. At the age of 18, he left Finland for his sister's wedding, who was then living on kibbutz Ein HaShofet.

== Professional career ==
Gindin spent eleven seasons with Hapoel Haifa. He made six appearances for the Israel national football team.
