= 1996–97 Liga Leumit =

Liga Leumit
- Season: 1996–97
- Champions: Beitar Jerusalem; 3rd title
- Relegated: Hapoel Tayibe; Tzafririm Holon
- Top goalscorer: Motti Kakoun (20)

The 1996–97 Liga Leumit season saw Beitar Jerusalem win their third title. Hapoel Tayibe (the first Arab club to play in the top flight since the establishment of Israel) and Tzafririm Holon were relegated to Liga Artzit. Motti Kakoun of Hapoel Petah Tikva was the league's top scorer with 20 goals.

== Final table ==
| Pos | Team | Pld | W | D | L | GF | GA | GD | Pts | Qualification or relegation |
|---|---|---|---|---|---|---|---|---|---|---|
| 1 | Beitar Jerusalem (C) | 30 | 21 | 6 | 3 | 62 | 20 | +42 | 69 | Qualification for the Champions League first qualifying round |
| 2 | Hapoel Petah Tikva | 30 | 18 | 6 | 6 | 57 | 37 | +20 | 60 | Qualification for the UEFA Cup first qualifying round |
| 3 | Hapoel Be'er Sheva | 30 | 19 | 3 | 8 | 44 | 25 | +19 | 60 | Qualification for the Cup Winners' Cup qualifying round |
| 4 | Maccabi Petah Tikva | 30 | 14 | 10 | 6 | 39 | 22 | +17 | 52 | Qualification for the Intertoto Cup group stage |
| 5 | Maccabi Haifa | 30 | 13 | 9 | 8 | 48 | 34 | +14 | 48 | Qualification for the Intertoto Cup group stage |
| 6 | Maccabi Tel Aviv | 30 | 13 | 7 | 10 | 47 | 34 | +13 | 46 | |
| 7 | Hapoel Haifa | 30 | 12 | 7 | 11 | 34 | 33 | +1 | 43 | |
| 8 | Hapoel Kfar Saba | 30 | 11 | 7 | 12 | 34 | 39 | −5 | 40 | |
| 9 | Ironi Rishon LeZion | 30 | 11 | 7 | 12 | 35 | 47 | −12 | 40 | |
| 10 | Bnei Yehuda | 30 | 10 | 8 | 12 | 32 | 40 | −8 | 38 | |
| 11 | Hapoel Beit She'an | 30 | 9 | 7 | 14 | 29 | 34 | −5 | 34 | |
| 12 | Hapoel Jerusalem | 30 | 9 | 7 | 14 | 30 | 41 | −11 | 34 | |
| 13 | Hapoel Tel Aviv | 30 | 8 | 9 | 13 | 29 | 32 | −3 | 33 | |
| 14 | Maccabi Herzliya | 30 | 9 | 5 | 16 | 19 | 28 | −9 | 32 | |
| 15 | Tzafririm Holon (R) | 30 | 4 | 9 | 17 | 17 | 43 | −26 | 21 | Relegation to Liga Artzit |
| 16 | Hapoel Tayibe (R) | 30 | 4 | 3 | 23 | 19 | 66 | −47 | 15 | Relegation to Liga Artzit |

(C) Champions; (R) Relegated

== Results ==
| Home \ Away | BEI | BnY | HBS | BTS | HHA | HJE | HKS | HPT | HTY | HTA | IRZ | MHA | MHE | MPT | MTA | TZH |
|---|---|---|---|---|---|---|---|---|---|---|---|---|---|---|---|---|
| Beitar Jerusalem | | 0–0 | 0–1 | 1–0 | 3–1 | 2–1 | 2–1 | 3–0 | 5–0 | 3–0 | 1–1 | 0–2 | 1–0 | 3–0 | 1–0 | 5–0 |
| Bnei Yehuda | 1–3 | | 0–2 | 0–0 | 2–0 | 2–0 | 2–2 | 1–3 | 2–0 | 0–0 | 2–2 | 2–1 | 0–1 | 1–4 | 2–1 | 1–0 |
| Hapoel Be'er Sheva | 1–3 | 3–0 | | 2–0 | 0–2 | 3–1 | 2–1 | 1–1 | 2–0 | 1–0 | 3–0 | 3–0 | 2–0 | 2–2 | 1–4 | 2–1 |
| Hapoel Beit She'an | 2–3 | 0–1 | 2–1 | | 3–0 | 1–2 | 0–1 | 1–2 | 2–0 | 2–1 | 1–3 | 2–1 | 1–1 | 1–1 | 1–0 | 0–0 |
| Hapoel Haifa | 1–1 | 2–2 | 0–1 | 2–1 | | 2–0 | 1–2 | 0–2 | 2–0 | 2–0 | 0–3 | 0–2 | 1–1 | 1–1 | 3–1 | 0–2 |
| Hapoel Jerusalem | 1–1 | 0–1 | 0–1 | 1–1 | 0–1 | | 2–0 | 0–3 | 1–1 | 1–0 | 2–1 | 2–1 | 0–1 | 1–2 | 0–4 | 2–1 |
| Hapoel Kfar Saba | 0–1 | 1–0 | 0–1 | 2–0 | 0–0 | 0–0 | | 3–3 | 2–1 | 0–0 | 3–0 | 1–5 | 2–1 | 1–0 | 1–2 | 0–2 |
| Hapoel Petah Tikva | 2–1 | 4–2 | 2–0 | 1–2 | 0–0 | 3–1 | 3–1 | | 3–0 | 1–0 | 4–2 | 0–0 | 0–1 | 1–0 | 1–1 | 3–0 |
| Hapoel Tayibe | 0–3 | 1–1 | 0–3 | 1–0 | 3–2 | 2–4 | 0–3 | 2–4 | | 0–4 | 0–1 | 2–4 | 1–0 | 0–2 | 1–5 | 1–0 |
| Hapoel Tel Aviv | 1–4 | 4–1 | 1–0 | 0–2 | 0–1 | 1–1 | 1–2 | 6–2 | 2–0 | | 0–0 | 1–3 | 0–2 | 0–0 | 2–1 | 2–1 |
| Ironi Rishon LeZion | 0–2 | 2–1 | 2–1 | 1–0 | 0–4 | 2–3 | 1–1 | 0–1 | 3–1 | 0–2 | | 2–2 | 1–0 | 0–6 | 2–1 | 2–0 |
| Maccabi Haifa | 0–2 | 2–1 | 0–1 | 1–1 | 2–1 | 1–0 | 4–1 | 5–2 | 1–1 | 0–0 | 1–1 | | 2–0 | 1–3 | 1–1 | 3–1 |
| Maccabi Herzliya | 1–1 | 0–1 | 1–2 | 2–0 | 0–1 | 1–0 | 1–0 | 1–3 | 1–0 | 1–1 | 0–1 | 1–2 | | 0–1 | 0–1 | 1–0 |
| Maccabi Petah Tikva | 0–3 | 0–0 | 0–0 | 1–1 | 0–2 | 1–1 | 2–0 | 0–1 | 1–0 | 1–0 | 3–1 | 1–0 | 2–0 | | 0–0 | 1–1 |
| Maccabi Tel Aviv | 3–3 | 2–1 | 2–1 | 1–2 | 0–0 | 0–2 | 1–2 | 2–1 | 2–1 | 0–0 | 1–0 | 1–1 | 1–0 | 0–3 | | 6–0 |
| Tzafririm Holon | 0–1 | 0–2 | 0–1 | 1–0 | 1–2 | 1–1 | 1–1 | 1–1 | 1–0 | 0–0 | 1–1 | 0–0 | 0–0 | 0–1 | 1–3 | |

Legend: Blue = home team win; Yellow = draw; Red = away team win.

== Top scorers ==
| Rank | Player | Club | Goals |
|---|---|---|---|
| 1 | (Israel) Moti Kakoun | Hapoel Petah Tikva | 20 |
| 2 | (Israel) Alon Mizrahi | Bnei Yehuda | 18 |
| 3 | (Israel) Ofer Shitrit | Maccabi Petah Tikva | 15 |
| 4 | (Israel) Eli Ohana | Beitar Jerusalem | 14 |
| 4 | (Israel) Itzik Zohar | Beitar Jerusalem | 14 |
| 6 | (Israel) Hezi Shirazi | Maccabi Haifa | 13 |
| 7 | (Israel) Avi Nimni | Maccabi Tel Aviv | 12 |
| 7 | (Israel) Yaniv Ofri | Hapoel Petah Tikva | 12 |
| 9 | (Israel) Shay Holtzman | Hapoel Beer Sheva | 11 |
| 10 | (Israel) Yaniv Abargil | Hapoel Kfar Saba | 10 |
| 10 | (Hungary) István Sallói | Beitar Jerusalem | 10 |
