= 1991–92 Liga Leumit =

Liga Leumit
- Season: 1991–92
- Champions: Maccabi Tel Aviv; 15th title
- Relegated: Maccabi Yavne; Hapoel Jerusalem
- Top goalscorer: Alon Mizrahi (20)

The 1991–92 Liga Leumit season began in 1991 and ended in 1992, with Maccabi Tel Aviv winning their 15th title and qualifying for the Champions League as Israel's first representative in the competition.

== Regular season ==
=== Table ===
Pos	Team	Pld	W	D	L	GF	GA	GD	Pts	Qualification
1	Maccabi Tel Aviv	22	16	3	3	54	22	+32	51	Qualification for the championship round
2	Bnei Yehuda	22	13	3	6	48	30	+18	42	Qualification for the championship round
3	Maccabi Haifa	22	9	5	8	33	24	+9	32	Qualification for the championship round
4	Hapoel Petah Tikva	22	8	8	6	25	25	0	32	Qualification for the championship round
5	Beitar Tel Aviv	22	9	4	9	32	25	+7	31	Qualification for the championship round
6	Maccabi Netanya	22	7	9	6	22	22	0	30	Qualification for the championship round
7	Maccabi Petah Tikva	22	9	3	10	28	29	−1	30	Qualification for the relegation round
8	Hapoel Tzafririm Holon	22	8	5	9	25	21	+4	29	Qualification for the relegation round
9	Hapoel Be'er Sheva	22	7	7	8	28	31	−3	28	Qualification for the relegation round
10	Hapoel Tel Aviv	22	6	6	10	19	29	−10	24	Qualification for the relegation round
11	Maccabi Yavne	22	4	7	11	20	37	−17	19	Qualification for the relegation round
12	Hapoel Jerusalem	22	5	2	15	12	51	−39	17	Qualification for the relegation round

Source: EU-Football.info

=== Results ===
Home \ Away	BTA	BnY	HBS	HJE	HPT	HTA	MHA	MNE	MPT	MTA	MYV	TZH
Beitar Tel Aviv	—	1–2	6–2	2–0	1–0	2–0	1–1	0–0	0–2	2–3	0–1	3–0
Bnei Yehuda	3–2	—	4–0	3–1	0–1	4–3	1–2	2–0	1–0	3–1	5–2	1–3
Hapoel Be'er Sheva	1–2	5–1	—	4–0	2–1	0–1	0–0	1–1	1–1	0–3	2–0	0–0
Hapoel Jerusalem	0–3	1–7	0–1	—	1–1	0–3	1–3	1–0	1–0	0–5	2–0	1–0
Hapoel Petah Tikva	2–1	1–1	2–1	2–1	—	1–0	1–1	0–0	1–0	1–3	3–1	0–0
Hapoel Tel Aviv	1–1	1–3	1–4	0–0	1–1	—	1–0	1–1	2–1	0–4	0–0	2–0
Maccabi Haifa	0–1	0–2	2–3	3–0	2–1	2–0	—	2–2	5–0	0–0	3–0	1–2
Maccabi Netanya	1–0	1–1	0–0	2–0	1–0	1–0	3–0	—	0–3	1–2	2–2	0–0
Maccabi Petah Tikva	2–1	2–1	5–1	3–0	1–1	0–1	0–2	2–1	—	0–2	2–0	2–1
Maccabi Tel Aviv	2–3	1–0	0–0	8–1	3–3	1–0	2–1	3–1	3–1	—	4–2	0–2
Maccabi Yavne	2–0	2–2	0–0	1–0	1–2	0–0	2–1	1–2	0–0	1–3	—	2–2
Tzafririm Holon	0–0	0–1	1–0	0–1	3–0	3–1	1–2	1–2	4–1	0–1	2–0	—

Legend: Blue = home team win; Yellow = draw; Red = away team win.

== Playoffs ==
=== Top playoff ===
==== Table ====
Pos	Team	Pld	W	D	L	GF	GA	GD	Pts	Qualification
1	Maccabi Tel Aviv (C)	32	23	6	3	82	29	+53	75	Qualification for the Champions League preliminary round
2	Bnei Yehuda	32	19	5	8	68	44	+24	62	
3	Maccabi Haifa	32	14	6	12	51	43	+8	48	
4	Hapoel Petah Tikva	32	11	10	11	34	35	−1	43	Qualification for the Cup Winners' Cup first round Qualification for the Intertoto Cup group stage
5	Beitar Tel Aviv	32	11	6	15	43	47	−4	39	
6	Maccabi Netanya	32	8	11	13	32	46	−14	35	Qualification for the Intertoto Cup group stage

Source: EU-Football.info
(C) Champions

==== Results ====
Home \ Away	BTA	BnY	HPT	MHA	MNE	MTA
Beitar Tel Aviv	—	1–3	1–1	0–2	3–2	1–1
Bnei Yehuda	3–2	—	1–0	1–4	2–2	2–3
Hapoel Petah Tikva	0–1	0–3	—	1–0	4–0	0–0
Maccabi Haifa	3–0	1–3	2–1	—	2–2	1–5
Maccabi Netanya	3–1	0–1	0–2	1–2	—	0–3
Maccabi Tel Aviv	4–1	1–1	2–0	5–1	4–0	—

Legend: Blue = home team win; Yellow = draw; Red = away team win.

=== Bottom playoff ===
==== Table ====
Pos	Team	Pld	W	D	L	GF	GA	GD	Pts	Relegation
7	Maccabi Petah Tikva	32	15	6	11	46	41	+5	51	
8	Hapoel Tzafririm Holon	32	11	8	13	38	35	+3	41	
9	Hapoel Tel Aviv	32	11	8	13	35	38	−3	41	
10	Hapoel Be'er Sheva	32	10	10	12	40	43	−3	40	
11	Maccabi Yavne (R)	32	8	9	15	36	50	−14	33	Relegation to Liga Artzit
12	Hapoel Jerusalem (R)	32	6	5	21	27	81	−54	23	Relegation to Liga Artzit

Source: EU-Football.info
(R) Relegated

==== Results ====
Home \ Away	HBS	HJE	HTA	MPT	MYV	TZH
Hapoel Be'er Sheva	—	2–1	1–0	3–1	1–1	0–0
Hapoel Jerusalem	5–4	—	0–0	2–2	1–2	4–4
Hapoel Tel Aviv	1–0	4–0	—	2–3	2–0	2–0
Maccabi Petah Tikva	0–0	3–1	2–1	—	1–0	2–0
Maccabi Yavne	2–1	5–0	2–3	2–2	—	1–0
Tzafririm Holon	1–0	4–1	1–1	1–2	2–1	—

Legend: Blue = home team win; Yellow = draw; Red = away team win.
