= Amir Turgeman =

Israeli footballer and manager

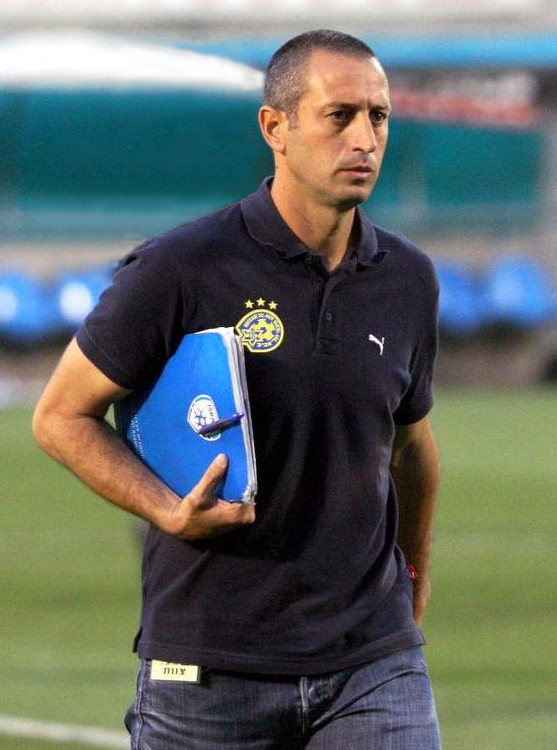

Personal information
- Date of birth: May 10, 1972 (age 54)
- Place of birth: Ashdod, Israel
- Position: Striker

Senior career*
Years	Team	Apps	(Gls)
1989–1992	Maccabi Tel Aviv	26	(3)
1992–1995	Ironi Ashdod	96	(53)
1995–1996	Hapoel Haifa	35	(15)
1997	Maccabi Haifa	18	(7)
1997–1999	Ironi Ashdod	60	(24)
1999–2001	Hapoel Haifa	73	(27)
2001–2003	Maccabi Tel Aviv	56	(11)
2003–2004	Beitar Jerusalem	30	(3)
2004–2005	F.C. Ashdod	12	(1)
2005–2006	Hakoah Ramat Gan	32	(13)
2006–2007	Hapoel Nazareth Illit	24	(4)

International career
1992–1993	Israel U-21	17	(7)
1994–2003	Israel	13	(2)

Managerial career
- 2008–2010: Maccabi Tel Aviv (youth team assistant)
- 2010–2013: Maccabi Tel Aviv (youth team)
- 2016–2017: Beitar Tel Aviv Ramla
- 2016–2017: Israel (assistant)
- 2017–2018: F.C. Ashdod
- 2018: Bnei Sakhnin
- 2019–2020: Sektzia Ness Ziona
- 2020: Hapoel Kfar Saba
- * Club domestic league appearances and goals

Amir Turgeman (Hebrew: עמיר תורג'מן; born May 10, 1972) is an Israeli football coach and a former international player. While playing for Ironi Ashdod during the 1994/95 season, Turgeman scored seventeen league goals and shared the golden boot award with Ashdod native and Maccabi Haifa striker, Haim Revivo.

== Honors ==
=== Maccabi Tel Aviv ===
- Israeli Premier League (2):
  - 1991-92, 2002-03
- Israel State Cup (1):
  - 2002

=== Maccabi Tel Aviv ===
- Israeli Youth Championship (2):
  - 2010-11, 2011–12
- Youth State Cup (1):
  - 2011
