= 1968–69 Liga Leumit =

Liga Leumit
- Season: 1968–69
- Champions: Hapoel Tel Aviv; 7th title
- Relegated: Maccabi Sha'arayim; Hapoel Ramat Gan
- Top goalscorer: Mordechai Spiegler (25)

The 1968–69 Liga Leumit season saw Hapoel Tel Aviv win the title and qualify for the 1970 Asian Club Championship. Maccabi Sha'arayim and Hapoel Ramat Gan were relegated to Liga Alef. Mordechai Spiegler of Maccabi Netanya was the league's top scorer with 25 goals.

== Final table ==
Pos	Team	Pld	W	D	L	GF	GA	GD	Pts	Qualification or relegation
1	Hapoel Tel Aviv	30	19	6	5	55	21	+34	44	Qualified for Asian Club Championship
2	Maccabi Tel Aviv	30	18	7	5	45	23	+22	43	
3	Maccabi Netanya	30	16	9	5	71	32	+39	41	
4	Hapoel Haifa	30	11	15	4	34	16	+18	37	
5	Maccabi Haifa	30	13	7	10	36	35	+1	33	
6	Hapoel Jerusalem	30	10	11	9	39	31	+8	31	
7	Hapoel Kfar Saba	30	9	10	11	34	40	−6	28	
8	Bnei Yehuda	30	11	5	14	36	38	−2	27	
9	Hapoel Petah Tikva	30	8	10	12	27	30	−3	26	
10	Hakoah Ramat Gan	30	8	10	12	30	40	−10	26	
11	Maccabi Jaffa	30	10	6	14	28	41	−13	26	
12	Shimshon Tel Aviv	30	8	10	12	29	45	−16	26	
13	Beitar Jerusalem	30	6	14	10	24	42	−18	26	
14	Hapoel Be'er Sheva	30	9	7	14	37	48	−11	25	
15	Maccabi Sha'arayim	30	7	9	14	32	44	−12	23	Relegated to Liga Alef
16	Hapoel Ramat Gan	30	5	8	17	11	42	−31	18	Relegated to Liga Alef

Source: rsssf.com

== Results ==
Home \ Away	BEI	BnY	HAR	HBS	HHA	HJE	HKS	HPT	HRG	HTA	MHA	MJA	MNE	MSH	MTA	STA
Beitar Jerusalem	—	0–2	0–0	2–1	1–0	0–0	3–1	0–0	0–0	0–0	0–1	1–1	1–1	0–2	0–3	1–1
Bnei Yehuda	0–0	—	1–1	2–3	0–0	2–0	0–1	0–3	3–0	1–2	3–0	2–1	1–2	4–0	1–3	1–0
Hakoah Ramat Gan	1–2	1–2	—	2–1	1–0	1–1	1–1	1–0	2–0	1–1	1–1	1–0	1–4	1–1	0–1	0–0
Hapoel Be'er Sheva	2–2	1–0	1–0	—	2–3	0–0	1–1	5–3	2–0	0–2	3–1	2–1	1–1	0–1	1–0	0–1
Hapoel Haifa	0–0	1–0	1–1	1–0	—	0–0	2–0	1–1	2–0	0–0	1–1	0–0	5–0	2–2	1–0	4–0
Hapoel Jerusalem	2–0	3–0	0–3	4–0	1–1	—	2–2	1–0	2–1	1–2	1–1	3–1	2–2	2–0	0–1	1–1
Hapoel Kfar Saba	1–1	1–1	1–0	3–2	1–2	1–1	—	2–2	2–0	1–1	3–1	2–1	0–3	4–0	1–2	1–0
Hapoel Petah Tikva	2–2	1–0	3–1	0–1	0–0	1–0	2–0	—	0–0	0–1	0–1	0–2	1–2	1–0	1–2	0–0
Hapoel Ramat Gan	1–1	1–1	1–2	1–0	0–0	0–2	1–0	0–2	—	1–0	0–0	0–3	1–1	1–0	0–1	1–1
Hapoel Tel Aviv	3–0	4–1	5–0	4–2	0–1	2–1	1–1	2–0	2–0	—	3–0	3–1	1–0	2–1	1–1	3–1
Maccabi Haifa	4–0	3–1	3–1	1–1	1–0	3–2	1–0	0–2	0–1	1–0	—	0–1	1–0	1–1	2–1	3–1
Maccabi Jaffa	0–1	1–2	2–1	0–0	2–1	0–2	2–0	0–0	1–0	0–3	0–2	—	0–2	2–1	1–3	2–1
Maccabi Netanya	5–1	1–0	2–3	5–1	1–1	2–1	1–2	3–0	6–0	4–1	4–1	7–1	—	3–0	2–2	4–0
Maccabi Sha'arayim	1–2	0–2	1–1	1–1	1–1	1–1	3–0	1–1	4–0	0–1	1–0	0–1	3–3	—	4–2	0–3
Maccabi Tel Aviv	4–1	4–2	1–0	2–0	0–0	3–0	2–0	1–1	1–0	1–0	1–0	0–0	0–0	2–1	—	1–1
Shimshon Tel Aviv	3–2	0–1	3–1	4–3	0–3	0–3	1–1	1–0	1–0	0–5	2–2	1–1	0–0	0–1	2–0	—

Legend: Blue = home team win; Yellow = draw; Red = away team win.
