= Aharon Gershgoren =

Israeli footballer

Aharon Gershgoren אהרון גרשגורן
- Gershgoren with Maccabi Haifa

Personal information
- Full name: Aharon Gershgoren
- Date of birth: 25 June 1948 (age 78)
- Place of birth: Haifa, Israel
- Position: Midfielder

Youth career
- 1958–1964: Maccabi Haifa

Senior career*
Years	Team	Apps	(Gls)
1964–1978	Maccabi Haifa	334	(27)

Managerial career
- 1974–1974: Hapoel Nahariya
- 1979–1980: Hapoel Afikim
- 1980–1981: Hapoel Tiberias
- 1984–1985: Hapoel Haifa
- 1986–1989: Hapoel Tiberias
- * Club domestic league appearances and goals

Aharon Gershgoren (Hebrew: אהרון גרשגורן) is an Israeli former footballer. He holds the most goals in a match record at Maccabi Haifa scoring six goals in one game.
