= Ofer Shitrit =

Israeli footballer (born 1970)

Personal information
- Date of birth: 12 July 1970 (age 56)
- Place of birth: Lod, Israel
- Position: Forward

Youth career
- Hapoel Lod

Senior career*
Years	Team	Apps	(Gls)
1987–1990	Hapoel Lod	65	(12)
1990	Hapoel Kfar Saba	9	(0)
1991	Hapoel Ramat Gan	15	(8)
1991–1992	Maccabi Ironi Ashdod	30	(12)
1992–1993	Maccabi Herzliya	18	(4)
1993–1994	Hapoel Lod	34	(36)
1994–1996	Maccabi Haifa	50	(28)
1996–1997	Maccabi Petah Tikva	27	(15)
1997–1998	Hapoel Tel Aviv	29	(17)
1998–1999	Beitar Jerusalem	6	(1)
1999–2000	Hapoel Haifa	12	(2)
2000	Maccabi Netanya	15	(2)
2000–2001	Bnei Yehuda	24	(6)
2001	F.C. Ashdod	11	(4)
2001–2003	Maccabi Kafr Kanna F.C.	52	(25)
2003–2004	Hapoel Ironi Rishon LeZion	16	(7)
2004–2005	Hapoel Bnei Lod	23	(19)
2005–2007	Hapoel Lod	24	(22)
2007	Hapoel Kfar Shalem	12	(3)
2008	Beitar Shimshon Tel Aviv F.C.	14	(3)
2008–2009	Hapoel Ironi Rishon LeZion	27	(10)
Total		513	(236)

International career
1998–1999	Israel	6	(1)
- * Club domestic league appearances and goals

Ofer Shitrit (Hebrew: עופר שטרית; born 12 July 1970) is an Israeli former professional footballer who played as a forward.

== Honours ==
Maccabi Haifa

- Israel State Cup: 1995
