= 1986–87 Liga Artzit =

Israeli football league season

The 1986–87 Liga Artzit season saw Tzafririm Holon win the title and promotion to Liga Leumit.

As both Liga Leumit and Liga Artzit reduced to 14 clubs each, the bottom four clubs, Hapoel Beit She'an, Beitar Ramla, Beitar Nahariya and Hapoel Dimona were all relegated to Liga Alef. furthermore, promotion-relegation play-offs held between the 11th and 12th placed clubs in Liga Artzit, Hapoel Marmorek and Hapoel Ramat Gan and the winners of the regional divisions of Liga Alef. the play-offs ended with Hapoel Ramat Gan remained in Liga Artzit and Hapoel Marmorek relegated to Liga Alef.

== Final table ==
Pos	Team	Pld	W	D	L	GF	GA	GD	Pts	Promotion or relegation
1	Tzafririm Holon	30	14	11	5	36	16	+20	53	Promoted to Liga Leumit
2	Hapoel Jerusalem	30	15	8	7	36	24	+12	53	
3	Hapoel Haifa	30	13	11	6	40	23	+17	50	
4	Hapoel Hadera	30	13	9	8	40	36	+4	48	
5	Hapoel Tiberias	30	12	7	11	38	34	+4	43	
6	Hapoel Yehud	30	11	9	10	31	30	+1	42	
7	Maccabi Ramat Amidar	30	12	6	12	26	29	−3	42	
8	Hapoel Acre	30	9	14	7	29	24	+5	41	
9	Maccabi Sha'arayim	30	9	13	8	25	19	+6	40	
10	Hakoah Ramat Gan	30	11	7	12	27	25	+2	40	
11	Hapoel Marmorek	30	11	6	13	36	36	0	39	Relegation play-offs
12	Hapoel Ramat Gan	30	9	11	10	23	26	−3	38	Relegation play-offs
13	Hapoel Beit She'an	30	7	16	7	26	29	−3	37	Relegated to Liga Alef
14	Beitar Ramla	30	8	13	9	25	37	−12	37	Relegated to Liga Alef
15	Beitar Nahariya	30	4	8	18	19	39	−20	20	Relegated to Liga Alef
16	Hapoel Dimona	30	4	7	19	21	51	−30	19	Relegated to Liga Alef

== Relegation play-offs ==
A promotion-relegation play-off between the 11th and 12th placed clubs in Liga Alef, Hapoel Marmorek and Hapoel Ramat Gan, and the winners of the regional divisions of Liga Alef, Maccabi Hadera and Hapoel Bat Yam. Each club played the other three once.

Hapoel Marmorek	1 – 3	Hapoel Ramat Gan

Ramat Gan Stadium

Maccabi Hadera	1 – 3	Hapoel Bat Yam

Ramat Gan Stadium

Hapoel Marmorek	2 – 2	Maccabi Hadera

Ramat Gan Stadium

Hapoel Ramat Gan	0 – 0	Hapoel Bat Yam

Ramat Gan Stadium

Hapoel Marmorek	1 – 2	Hapoel Bat Yam

Ramat Gan Stadium

Hapoel Ramat Gan	0 – 1	Maccabi Hadera

Ramat Gan Stadium

Pos	Team	Pld	W	D	L	GF	GA	GD	Pts	Promotion or relegation
1	Hapoel Bat Yam	3	2	1	0	5	2	+3	7	Promoted to Liga Artzit
2	Hapoel Ramat Gan	3	1	1	1	3	2	+1	4	Remained in Liga Artzit
3	Maccabi Hadera	3	1	1	1	4	5	−1	4	Remained in Liga Alef
4	Hapoel Marmorek	3	0	1	2	4	7	−3	1	Relegated to Liga Alef
