= Eli Guttman =

Israeli former football player and manager

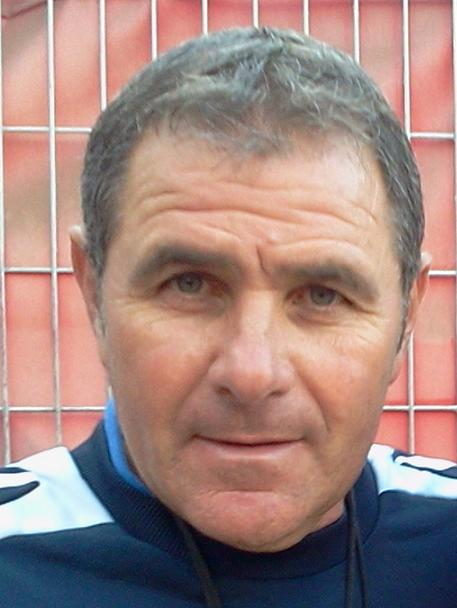
- Gutman in 2011

Personal information
- Full name: Israel Guttman
- Date of birth: 24 February 1958 (age 68)
- Place of birth: Israel

Youth career
- Hapoel Haifa

Senior career*
Years	Team	Apps	(Gls)
1979–1980	Beitar Netanya		
1980–1984	Maccabi Neve Sha'anan		
1984–1985	Maccabi Kiryat Bialik		

Managerial career
- 1985–1986: Maccabi Kiryat Bialik
- 1986–1987: Beitar Haifa
- 1988–1989: Hapoel Tirat HaCarmel
- 1989–1990: Maccabi Tamra
- 1990–1992: Maccabi Haifa (assistant manager)
- 1992–1994: Hapoel Tzafririm Holon
- 1994–1995: Maccabi Herzliya
- 1995: Hapoel Beit She'an
- 1996–1997: Hapoel Be'er Sheva
- 1997–2000: Hapoel Haifa
- 2000–2001: Beitar Jerusalem
- 2001–2002: Hapoel Petah Tikva
- 2002–2003: Hapoel Haifa
- 2003–2005: Hapoel Be'er Sheva
- 2005–2006: Paralimni
- 2006–2007: Maccabi Netanya
- 2007: AEL Limassol
- 2007–2011: Hapoel Tel Aviv
- 2011–2015: Israel
- 2016: Hapoel Tel Aviv
- 2018: Maccabi Haifa
- * Club domestic league appearances and goals

Israel "Eli" Guttman (or Gutman, Hebrew: אלי גוטמן; born 24 February 1958) is an Israeli former football player and manager who most recently managed Maccabi Haifa, before officially announcing his retirement from the football world, stating health issues as the main reason.

== Career ==
Guttman was born in Israel, to a family of Ashkenazi Jewish descent. He started playing football as a teenager in the youth ranks of Hapoel Haifa but never managed to play for the senior team. He moved to play for Beitar Netanya in Liga Alef and later played in Liga Bet for Maccabi Neve Sha'anan and Maccabi Kiryat Bialik.

After six years of playing in the lower divisions in Israeli football, he retired from playing and the following season started to work as a manager. His first club as a manager was the club where he last played - Maccabi Kiryat Bialik. The next season, he moved to manage Beitar Haifa in Liga Alef. A year later he worked as the manager of Hapoel Tirat HaCarmel and in 1989–90 he managed Maccabi Tamra in Liga Artzit, Tamra got relegated in the end of the season.

In 1990 Guttman worked as the assistant manager of Maccabi Haifa. Guttman worked under Shlomo Scharf for two seasons, winning both the Israeli championship and the state cup in the 1990–91 season. In 1992 Guttman left Haifa to work as the manager of Tzafririm Holon, later on he managed Maccabi Herzliya and Hapoel Beit She'an.

He won his first Israeli title in 1997, winning the Israel State Cup with Hapoel Be'er Sheva.

He coached Hapoel Haifa during the 1998–99 season, in which the club won their first Liga Leumit title.

In 2001, he became coach of Hapoel Petah Tikva. In the 2001–02 season the team finished sixth; Gutman resigned in May immediately following the season's conclusion. He subsequently returned to Hapoel Be'er Sheva, and later spent two years coaching Paralimni in Cyprus.

At the start of the 2006–07 season he became coach of Maccabi Netanya, but was sacked in January 2007 following a dispute with team captain Liran Strauber.

From February 2007 until early December 2007 he coached AEL Limassol before joining Hapoel Tel Aviv as successor to Guy Luzon. He helped the team escape relegation, gradually building the team until they won the Israeli double – Israeli Premier League championship and Israel State Cup – in 2010. The following season, he coached the team to its first-ever qualification to the UEFA Champions League group stage. In May 2011, after winning the 2011 Israeli State Cup, he left Hapoel Tel Aviv.

On 27 December 2011, he was appointed manager of the Israeli national football team. On October 14, 2015 after the Euro 2016 qualifying campaign was highly unsuccessful, Guttman decided to leave his position as the manager of the national side.

== Honours ==
=== Manager ===
- Israel State Cup:
  - 1997, 2010, 2011
- Israeli Premier League:
  - 1998–99, 2009–10

== Managerial statistics ==
As of 26 March 2016

Team	Nat	From	To	Record				
Team	Nat	From	To	G	W	D	L	Win %
Hapoel Tel Aviv	(Israel)	December 4, 2007	May 21, 2011	101	60	23	18	59.41
Israel	(Israel)	December 27, 2011	October 13, 2015	31	10	7	14	32.26
Hapoel Tel Aviv	(Israel)	January 12, 2016	September 20, 2016	6	1	3	2	16.67
Total				138	71	33	34	51.45
