= 1987–88 Toto Cup Leumit =

Toto Cup Leumit
- Season: 1987–88
- Champions: Shimshon Tel Aviv

The 1987–88 Toto Cup Leumit was the fourth season of the third most important football tournament in Israel since its introduction.

It was held in two stages. First, the 14 Liga Leumit teams, with Hapoel Haifa and Hapoel Jerusalem from Liga Artzit, were divided into four groups. The group winners advanced to the semi-finals, which, like the final, were one-legged matches.

The competition was won by Shimshon Tel Aviv, who beat Bnei Yehuda 4–2 in the final.

== Group stage ==
=== Group A ===
Pos	Team	Pld	W	D	L	GF	GA	GD	Pts	Qualification or relegation
1	Shimshon Tel Aviv	6	4	0	2	8	6	+2	12	Qualification to Semi Final
2	Maccabi Haifa	6	3	2	1	15	8	+7	11	
3	Beitar Tel Aviv	6	2	1	3	4	9	−5	7	
4	Beitar Jerusalem	6	1	1	4	8	12	−4	4	

Updated to match(es) played on 19 March 1988. Source: Yedioth Ahronoth, 20 March 1988

=== Group B ===
Pos	Team	Pld	W	D	L	GF	GA	GD	Pts	Qualification or relegation
1	Bnei Yehuda	6	5	0	1	11	2	+9	15	Qualification to Semi Final
2	Hapoel Tzafririm Holon	6	2	1	3	4	6	−2	7	
3	Hapoel Petah Tikva	6	2	1	3	4	7	−3	7	
4	Maccabi Petah Tikva	6	1	2	3	4	8	−4	5	

Updated to match(es) played on 19 March 1988. Source: Yedioth Ahronoth, 20 March 1988

=== Group C ===
Pos	Team	Pld	W	D	L	GF	GA	GD	Pts	Qualification or relegation
1	Maccabi Netanya	6	3	2	1	9	7	+2	11	Qualification to Semi Final
2	Hapoel Be'er Sheva	6	2	2	2	8	3	+5	8	
3	Hapoel Jerusalem	6	2	2	2	7	6	+1	8	
4	Maccabi Tel Aviv	6	2	0	4	6	14	−8	6	

Updated to match(es) played on 19 March 1988. Source: Yedioth Ahronoth, 20 March 1988

=== Group D ===
Pos	Team	Pld	W	D	L	GF	GA	GD	Pts	Qualification or relegation
1	Hapoel Tel Aviv	6	4	2	0	13	3	+10	14	Qualification to Semi Final
2	Hapoel Kfar Saba	6	4	2	0	11	5	+6	14	
3	Hapoel Haifa	6	0	2	4	4	10	−6	2	
4	Hapoel Lod	6	0	2	4	2	12	−10	2	

Updated to match(es) played on 19 March 1988. Source: Yedioth Ahronoth, 20 March 1988

== Elimination rounds ==
=== Semifinals ===
29 March 1988	Shimshon Tel Aviv	2–0	Maccabi Netanya	Petah Tikva
	Cohen 9', 64'			Stadium: Petah Tikva Municipal Stadium; Attendance: 400; Referee: Ovadia Zvi

29 March 1988	Bnei Yehuda	1–0	Hapoel Tel Aviv	Herzliya
	Shirazi 71'			Stadium: Herzliya Municipal Stadium; Attendance: 300; Referee: Haim Lipkovich

=== Final ===
6 April 1988

Shimshon Tel Aviv	4–2	Bnei Yehuda
Ovadia 15'; Barda 37'; Mizrahi 27', 82' (pen.)		Salman 28', 89' (pen.)

Petah Tikva Municipal Stadium
Attendance: 2,000
Referee: Itzhak Ben Itzhak

== See also ==
- 1987–88 Toto Cup Artzit
