= 1982–83 Liga Alef =

Israeli football season

The 1982–83 Liga Alef season saw Beitar Haifa (champions of the North Division) and Hapoel Marmorek (champions of the South Division) win the title and promotion to Liga Artzit. Hapoel Holon also promoted after promotion play-offs.

== North Division ==
Pos	Team	Pld	W	D	L	GF	GA	GD	Pts	Promotion or relegation
1	Beitar Haifa	26	14	12	0	50	14	+36	40	Promoted to Liga Artzit
2	Maccabi Hadera	26	14	8	4	37	14	+23	36	Promotion play-offs
3	Hapoel Tiberias	26	12	9	5	47	21	+26	33	
4	Hapoel Ramat HaSharon	26	11	11	4	39	21	+18	33	
5	Maccabi Herzliya	26	10	11	5	30	25	+5	31	
6	Hapoel Kiryat Ata	26	10	9	7	24	23	+1	29	
7	Beitar Netanya	26	8	11	7	25	23	+2	27	
8	Hapoel Tirat HaCarmel	26	8	10	8	27	28	−1	26	
9	Hapoel Bnei Nazareth	26	9	6	11	27	32	−5	24	
10	Maccabi Bnei Hatzor	26	7	9	10	28	33	−5	23	
11	Hapoel Ra'anana	26	7	7	12	38	33	+5	21	
12	Hapoel Migdal HaEmek	26	8	4	14	23	38	−15	20	
13	Hapoel Givat Olga	26	5	6	15	24	55	−31	16	Relegated to Liga Bet
14	Hapoel Nahliel	26	1	3	22	14	73	−59	5	Relegated to Liga Bet

== South Division ==
Pos	Team	Pld	W	D	L	GF	GA	GD	Pts	Promotion or relegation
1	Hapoel Marmorek	25	14	9	2	49	28	+21	37	Promoted to Liga Artzit
2	Maccabi Sha'arayim	26	12	11	3	29	17	+12	35	Disqualified
3	Hapoel Holon	26	14	6	6	40	18	+22	34	Promotion play-offs
4	Maccabi Kiryat Gat	26	10	12	4	33	20	+13	32	
5	Hapoel Kiryat Ono	26	10	8	8	23	19	+4	28	
6	Ironi Ashdod	26	8	11	7	32	28	+4	27	
7	Hapoel Yeruham	26	9	9	8	30	36	−6	27	
8	Hapoel Ramla	26	9	8	9	28	35	−7	26	
9	Hapoel Bat Yam	26	6	10	10	22	27	−5	22	
10	Hapoel Azor	26	6	10	10	25	32	−7	22	
11	Beitar Be'er Sheva	26	6	9	11	24	30	−6	21	
12	Tzafririm Holon	26	5	10	11	19	29	−10	20	
13	Hapoel Ashdod	26	6	7	13	25	40	−15	19	Relegated to Liga Bet
14	Hapoel Dimona	26	4	7	15	18	36	−18	15	Relegated to Liga Bet

== Promotion play-offs ==
14.5.83

Maccabi Hadera	0 – 1	Maccabi Sha'arayim

Winter Stadium
21.5.83

Maccabi Sha'arayim	3 – 1	Maccabi Hadera

Winter Stadium

Maccabi Sha'arayim would have been promoted to Liga Artzit. however, shortly after their second leg victory over Maccabi Hadera, it was discovered that a resident of Rehovot (city of Maccabi Sha'arayim), attempted to bribe several players from Maccabi Hadera. as a result, Maccabi Sha'arayim were disqualified, and the promotion play-offs rearranged, between the third placed club in the South division, Hapoel Holon, and Maccabi Hadera.

5.7.83

Maccabi Hadera	0 – 0	Hapoel Holon

Maccabi Netanya Stadium
12.7.83

Hapoel Holon	3 – 0	Maccabi Hadera

Maccabi Netanya Stadium

Hapoel Holon promoted to Liga Artzit.
