= 1987–88 Toto Cup Artzit =

Toto Cup Artzit
- Season: 1987–88
- Champions: Hapoel Bat Yam

The 1987–88 Toto Cup Artzit was the 4th season of the second tier League Cup since its introduction.

It was held in two stages. First, 12 Liga Artzit teams (without Hapoel Haifa and Hapoel Jerusalem, which were selected to play in the 1987–88 Toto Cup Leumit), were divided into three groups. The group winners advanced to the final group.

The competition was won by Hapoel Bat Yam, who had overcome Hapoel Ramat Gan and Maccabi Yavne in the final group.

== Group stage ==
=== Group A ===
Pos	Team	Pld	W	D	L	GF	GA	GD	Pts	Qualification or relegation
1	Maccabi Yavne	6	4	1	1	10	2	+8	13	Qualification to Final Group
2	Hapoel Hadera	6	3	1	2	9	6	+3	10	
3	Hakoah Amidar Ramat Gan	6	1	3	2	2	8	−6	6	
4	Maccabi Ramat Amidar	6	1	1	4	5	1	+4	4	

Updated to match(es) played on 19 March 1988. Source: Yedioth Ahronoth, 20 March 1988

=== Group B ===
Pos	Team	Pld	W	D	L	GF	GA	GD	Pts	Qualification or relegation
1	Hapoel Bat Yam	6	3	2	1	9	4	+5	11	Qualification to Final Group
2	Hapoel Tiberias	6	3	1	2	13	10	+3	10	
3	Maccabi Jaffa	6	2	2	2	8	8	0	8	
4	Hapoel Acre	6	0	3	3	6	14	−8	3	

Updated to match(es) played on 19 March 1988. Source: Yedioth Ahronoth, 20 March 1988

=== Group C ===
Pos	Team	Pld	W	D	L	GF	GA	GD	Pts	Qualification or relegation
1	Hapoel Ramat Gan	6	3	2	1	9	4	+5	11	Qualification to Final Group
2	Hapoel Yehud	6	3	1	2	13	10	+3	10	
3	Maccabi Sha'arayim	6	2	2	2	8	8	0	8	
4	Beitar Netanya	6	0	3	3	6	14	−8	3	

Updated to match(es) played on 19 March 1988. Source: Yedioth Ahronoth, 20 March 1988

== Final Group ==
Pos	Team	Pld	W	D	L	GF	GA	GD	Pts	Qualification or relegation	HBY	HRG	MYV
1	Hapoel Bat Yam	2	1	1	0	1	0	+1	4	Winners	—		1–0
2	Hapoel Ramat Gan	2	0	2	0	0	0	0	2		0–0	—	
3	Maccabi Yavne	2	0	1	1	0	1	−1	1			0–0	—

Updated to match(es) played on 6 April 1988. Source: Yedioth Ahronoth, 7 April 1988

== See also ==
- 1987–88 Toto Cup Leumit
