= 1998–99 Liga Artzit =

Football league season

The 1998–99 Liga Artzit season was the last in which the league was the Israel's second tier, as at the end of the season the Israeli Premier League came into existence, replacing Liga Leumit as the country's top division. As a result, for the 1999–2000 season Liga Leumit became the second division and Liga Artzit became the third division.

Due to the restructuring, only one club, Maccabi Netanya, was promoted to the top division (which was reduced from 16 to 14 clubs). At the other end of the table, eight clubs were due to be relegated as the second division was reduced to 10 clubs. However, Bnei Sakhnin, who had finished eighth from bottom, were reprieved from relegation as Maccabi Jaffa, who had finished bottom of the top division, were relegated three levels to Liga Alef due to their budget not being approved by the Israel Football Association.

Although the bottom eight were due to be relegated to the third tier for the 1999–2000 season, three of them (Hapoel Ashdod, Hapoel Lod and SK Nes Tziona) were relegated two levels as like Maccabi Jaffa, their budgets for the 1999–2000 season were not approved by the IFA.

== Final table ==
Pos	Team	Pld	W	D	L	GF	GA	GD	Pts	Promotion or relegation
1	Maccabi Netanya	30	18	11	1	54	20	+34	65	Promoted to Premier League
2	Hapoel Ashkelon	30	19	5	6	62	34	+28	62	Remained at second level
3	Hapoel Be'er Sheva	30	17	9	4	54	16	+38	60	Remained at second level
4	Beitar Avraham Be'er Sheva	30	18	5	7	50	21	+29	59	Remained at second level
5	Maccabi Acre	30	16	7	7	69	37	+32	55	Remained at second level
6	Hakoah Ramat Gan	30	15	10	5	62	31	+31	55	Remained at second level
7	Maccabi Kiryat Gat	30	14	9	7	52	37	+15	49 (Note: 2 points deducted for violating budget rules.)	Remained at second level
8	Maccabi Ahi Nazareth	30	12	9	9	44	36	+8	45	Remained at second level
9	Bnei Sakhnin	30	11	10	9	56	35	+21	43	Remained at second level
10	Hapoel Ashdod	30	8	14	8	42	39	+3	38	Relegated to Liga Alef
11	Beitar Tel Aviv	30	10	3	17	28	46	−18	33	Relegated to Liga Artzit
12	Hapoel Bat Yam	30	8	6	16	52	64	−12	30	Relegated to Liga Artzit
13	Maccabi Kafr Kanna	30	6	5	19	34	54	−20	23	Relegated to Liga Artzit
14	Hapoel Lod	30	6	5	19	32	69	−37	23	Relegated to Liga Alef
15	SK Nes Tziona	30	5	2	23	30	103	−73	13 (Note: 4 points deducted for violating budget rules.)	Relegated to Liga Alef
16	Hapoel Tayibe	30	2	0	28	27	106	−79	6	Relegated to Liga Artzit

Source: rsssf.com
