= 1986–87 Liga Alef =

Israeli football season

The 1986–87 Liga Alef season saw Maccabi Hadera (champions of the North Division) and Hapoel Bat Yam (champions of the South Division) win their regional divisions, and qualify for promotion play-offs against the 11th and 12th placed clubs in Liga Artzit, Hapoel Marmorek and Hapoel Ramat Gan. Hapoel Bat Yam were the only promoted club from Liga Alef to Liga Artzit.

At the end of the season, Liga Alef expanded from 14 to 16 clubs in each division, due to the reduction from 16 to 14 clubs in both Liga Leumit and Liga Artzit.

== North Division ==
Pos	Team	Pld	W	D	L	GF	GA	GD	Pts	Qualification or relegation
1	Maccabi Hadera	26	13	8	5	35	14	+21	34	Promotion play-offs
2	Hapoel Ra'anana	26	11	10	5	29	20	+9	32	
3	Maccabi Tamra	26	7	16	3	20	13	+7	30	
4	Beitar Haifa	26	9	10	7	28	23	+5	28	
5	Hapoel Kiryat Shmona	26	8	12	6	21	21	0	28	
6	Hapoel Kiryat Ata	26	8	11	7	28	24	+4	27	
7	Hapoel Tira	26	8	11	7	27	26	+1	27	
8	Hapoel Bnei Tamra	26	8	9	9	34	34	0	24 (Note: 1 point deducted?)	
9	Maccabi Afula	26	8	8	10	16	22	−6	24	
10	Hapoel Tayibe	26	7	10	9	21	32	−11	24	
11	Hapoel Tirat HaCarmel	26	5	14	7	30	32	−2	23 (Note: 1 point deducted?)	
12	Maccabi Ahi Nazareth	26	4	14	8	19	22	−3	22	
13	Hapoel Aliyah Kfar Saba	26	4	13	9	26	32	−6	21	Relegated to Liga Bet
14	Maccabi Or Akiva	26	3	11	12	16	35	−19	17	Relegated to Liga Bet

== South Division ==
Pos	Team	Pld	W	D	L	GF	GA	GD	Pts	Qualification or relegation
1	Hapoel Bat Yam	26	12	12	2	23	11	+12	36	Promotion play-offs
2	Hapoel Kiryat Ono	26	13	6	7	27	15	+12	32	
3	Hapoel Azor	26	10	11	5	34	24	+10	31	
4	Hapoel Ashkelon	26	10	10	6	21	15	+6	30	
5	Hapoel Rishon LeZion	26	10	8	8	38	25	+13	28	
6	Hapoel Kiryat Malakhi	26	7	14	5	18	19	−1	28	
7	Hapoel Ramla	26	9	9	8	27	24	+3	27	
8	Maccabi Kiryat Gat	26	7	13	6	18	16	+2	27	
9	Hapoel Beit Shemesh	26	7	9	10	26	30	−4	23	
10	Maccabi Lazarus Holon	26	7	9	10	24	29	−5	23	
11	Hapoel Ramat HaSharon	26	6	11	9	23	29	−6	23	
12	Hapoel Or Yehuda	26	3	15	8	15	21	−6	21	
13	Beitar Be'er Sheva	26	5	8	13	21	43	−22	17 (Note: 1 point deducted?)	Relegated to Liga Bet
14	Hapoel Yeruham	26	4	9	13	24	38	−14	16 (Note: 1 point deducted?)	Relegated to Liga Bet

== Promotion play-offs ==
A promotion-relegation play-off between the Liga Alef regional winners, Maccabi Hadera and Hapoel Bat Yam and the 11th and 12th placed clubs in Liga Artzit, Hapoel Marmorek and Hapoel Ramat Gan. Each club played the other three once.

Hapoel Marmorek	1 – 3	Hapoel Ramat Gan

Ramat Gan Stadium

Maccabi Hadera	1 – 3	Hapoel Bat Yam

Ramat Gan Stadium

Hapoel Marmorek	2 – 2	Maccabi Hadera

Ramat Gan Stadium

Hapoel Ramat Gan	0 – 0	Hapoel Bat Yam

Ramat Gan Stadium

Hapoel Marmorek	1 – 2	Hapoel Bat Yam

Ramat Gan Stadium

Hapoel Ramat Gan	0 – 1	Maccabi Hadera

Ramat Gan Stadium

Pos	Team	Pld	W	D	L	GF	GA	GD	Pts	Promotion or relegation
1	Hapoel Bat Yam	3	2	1	0	5	2	+3	5	Promoted to Liga Artzit
2	Hapoel Ramat Gan	3	1	1	1	3	2	+1	3	Remained in Liga Artzit
3	Maccabi Hadera	3	1	1	1	4	5	−1	3	Remained in Liga Alef
4	Hapoel Marmorek	3	0	1	2	4	7	−3	1	Relegated to Liga Alef
