= List of Israeli Premier League clubs =

The following is a list of clubs which have played in the Israeli Premier League at any time since its formation in 1999. Israeli Premier League teams playing in the 2010–11 Israeli Premier League season are indicated in bold. Founding members of the Israeli Premier League are shown in italics. If the longest spell is the current spell, this is indicated in bold, and if the highest finish is that of the most recent season, this is also in bold.

A total of 26 teams have played in the Israeli Premier League.

All statistics here refer to time in the Israeli Premier League only, with the exception of 'Most recent finish' which refers to all levels of play, and 'Last promotion' which refers to the club's last promotion from the second tier of Israeli football.

Club	City	Total Seasons	Total Spells	Longest Spell	Last Promotion	Last Relegation	Years Absent	Seasons	Most Recent Finish	Highest Finish
**Beitar Jerusalem**	Jerusalem	11	1	**11**	1991–92	Never; Relegated	0	**1999–**	5th	1st
**Bnei Sakhnin**	Sakhnin	6	2	3	2006–07	2005–06	0	2003–2006; 2007–	7th	4th
**Bnei Yehuda**	Tel Aviv	10	2	6	2001–02	2000–01	0	1999–2001; 2002–	4th	4th
**Maccabi Haifa**	Haifa	11	1	**11**	1974–75	Never; Relegated	0	**1999–**	2nd	1st
**Hapoel Tel Aviv**	Tel Aviv	11	1	**11**	1989–90	Never; Relegated	0	**1999–**	1st	1st
