= Felix Halfon =

Israeli footballer

Personal information
- Full name: Felix Halfon
- Date of birth: 7 April 1972 (age 54)
- Place of birth: Bat Yam, Israel
- Position: Defender

Senior career*
| Years | Team | Apps | (Gls) |
| 1988–1994 | Hapoel Tel Aviv | 67 | (2) |
| 1994–1995 | Hapoel Ironi Rishon LeZion | 29 | (1) |
| 1995–1996 | Hapoel Haifa | 30 | (1) |
| 1996–1999 | Hapoel Tel Aviv | 76 | (3) |
| 1999–2000 | Maccabi Tel Aviv | 34 | (3) |
| 2000–2001 | Beitar Jerusalem | 32 | (1) |
| 2001–2002 | Beitar Be'er Sheva | 1 | (0) |
| 2002–2004 | Bnei Yehuda Tel Aviv | 26 | (0) |
| 2006–2008 | Hapoel Ironi Rishon LeZion | 37 | (0) |
| 2008 | Maccabi Ironi Bat Yam | 6 | (0) |
| 2009 | Hapoel Kfar Shalem | 13 | (0) |
| 2010 | Beitar Jaffa | 16 | (12) |
| 2010 | Hapoel Kiryat Shalom | 4 | (6) |
| 2011 | Hapoel Neve Golan | 8 | (9) |
| 2011–2012 | Hapoel Morasha Ramat Hasharon | 30 | (34) |
| 2012–2016 | Hapoel Abirei Bat Yam | 91 | (97) |
| 2014 | → Hapoel Neve Golan | 7 | (11) |
| 2014 | → Elitzur Jaffa Tel Aviv | 4 | (7) |
| 2016 | Ironi Lod | 1 | (0) |
| 2016–2017 | Hapoel Abirei Bat Yam | 21 | (53) |

International career
| 1991–1992 | Israel U21 | 7 | (0) |
| 1992–1998 | Israel | 38 | (0) |

Managerial career
- 2009–2010: Bnot HaSharon
- 2011–2013: Ironi Nir Ramat HaSharon (youth defensive coordinator)
- 2013–: Ironi Nir Ramat HaSharon (youth)
- * Club domestic league appearances and goals

Felix Halfon (Hebrew: פליקס חלפון; born 7 April 1972) is an Israeli footballer.

== Drug smuggling conviction ==
In August 2003 Halfon was caught smuggling cocaine in the Ben Gurion International Airport. In 2004 Felix was sentenced for 4.5 years in prison but was released in June 2006 after 2.5 years for good behavior.

== Honours ==
- State Cup (1):
  - 1999
- Liga Gimel (Sharon) (1):
  - 2011-12
