= 1977–78 Liga Alef =

Israeli football season

The 1977–78 Liga Alef season saw Hapoel Tiberias (champions of the North Division) and Hapoel Marmorek (champions of the South Division) win the title and promotion to Liga Artzit.

Second and third placed clubs, Maccabi Herzliya and Hapoel Beit She'an from the North division, with Hapoel Lod and Hapoel Bat Yam from the South division, were also promoted, as both Liga Leumit and Liga Artzit expanded from 14 to 16 clubs each.

== North Division ==
Pos	Team	Pld	W	D	L	GF	GA	GD	Pts	Promotion or relegation
1	Hapoel Tiberias	26	15	7	4	34	17	+17	37	Promoted to Liga Artzit
2	Maccabi Herzliya	26	14	8	4	43	25	+18	36	Promoted to Liga Artzit
3	Hapoel Beit She'an	26	12	11	3	37	16	+21	35	Promoted to Liga Artzit
4	Beitar Netanya	26	14	2	10	42	33	+9	30	
5	Hapoel Nahariya	26	9	8	9	28	40	−12	26	
6	Hapoel Nazareth Illit	26	9	7	10	31	27	+4	25	
7	Hapoel Kiryat Shmona	26	8	8	10	21	25	−4	24	
8	Hapoel Ra'anana	26	6	11	9	23	26	−3	23	
9	Hapoel Nahliel	26	6	10	10	24	31	−7	22	
10	Hapoel Afikim	26	8	6	12	27	36	−9	22	
11	Maccabi Hadera	26	7	8	11	21	34	−13	22	
12	Hapoel Tel Hanan	26	8	7	11	26	23	+3	21 (Note: 2 points deducted.)	
13	Hapoel Bnei Nazareth	26	7	7	12	30	37	−7	21	Relegated to Liga Bet
14	Hapoel Beit Eliezer	26	6	6	14	22	39	−17	18	Relegated to Liga Bet

== South Division ==
Pos	Team	Pld	W	D	L	GF	GA	GD	Pts	Promotion or relegation
1	Hapoel Marmorek	26	13	9	4	40	19	+21	35	Promoted to Liga Artzit
2	Hapoel Lod	26	12	11	3	36	24	+12	35	Promoted to Liga Artzit
3	Hapoel Bat Yam	26	10	12	4	37	21	+16	32	Promoted to Liga Artzit
4	Hapoel Ashkelon	26	9	13	4	31	19	+12	31	
5	Hapoel Ramla	26	10	7	9	38	28	+10	27	
6	Hapoel Kiryat Ono	26	11	5	10	31	38	−7	27	
7	Maccabi Yavne	26	7	11	8	28	30	−2	25	
8	SK Nes Tziona	26	6	12	8	34	35	−1	23 (Note: 1 point deducted.)	
9	Beitar Ashdod	26	8	7	11	32	41	−9	23	
10	Hapoel Or Yehuda	26	8	6	12	37	39	−2	22	
11	Hapoel Herzliya	26	7	9	10	30	32	−2	22	
12	Beitar Ramla	26	6	10	10	15	25	−10	22	
13	Maccabi HaShikma Ramat Gan	26	8	4	14	19	33	−14	20	Relegated to Liga Bet
14	Hapoel Rosh HaAyin	26	5	8	13	22	46	−24	18	Relegated to Liga Bet
