= 1988–89 Liga Artzit =

The 1988–89 Liga Artzit season saw Hapoel Ramat Gan win the title and promotion to Liga Leumit. At the other end of the table, Hapoel Bat Yam and Hapoel Yehud relegated to Liga Alef. However, after the season finished Beitar Ramla was found guilty in match fixing and was relegated to Liga Alef while Hapoel Bat Yam was reprieved.

At the end of the season, Liga Artzit expanded from 14 to 16 clubs, as Liga Leumit reduced in size from 14 to 12 clubs.

== Final table ==
=== Promotion group ===
Pos	Team	Pld	W	D	L	GF	GA	GD	Pts	Promotion
1	Hapoel Ramat Gan	31	20	5	6	52	26	+26	65	Promoted to Liga Leumit
2	Maccabi Yavne	31	18	10	3	43	15	+28	62 (Note: 2 points deducted.)	
3	Maccabi Petah Tikva	31	14	11	6	40	22	+18	53	
4	Maccabi Jaffa	31	13	8	10	43	28	+15	47	
5	Hapoel Hadera	31	12	9	10	35	35	0	45	
6	Maccabi Sha'arayim	31	10	8	13	27	42	−15	38	

=== Relegation group ===
Pos	Team	Pld	W	D	L	GF	GA	GD	Pts	Relegation
7	Hapoel Haifa	33	8	15	10	33	39	−6	39	
8	Maccabi Ramat Amidar	33	9	12	12	27	37	−10	39	
9	Beitar Netanya	33	7	15	11	32	36	−4	36	
10	Maccabi Tamra	33	6	18	9	24	29	−5	36	
11	Hapoel Lod	33	8	11	14	27	43	−16	35	
12	Hapoel Bat Yam	33	8	9	16	23	28	−5	33	
13	Hapoel Yehud	33	6	13	14	30	43	−13	30 (Note: A match between Hapoel Yehud and Beitar Ramla (which Ramla originally won 1–0) was set to 0–0 with no points awarded.)	Relegated to Liga Alef
14	Beitar Ramla	33	5	18	10	20	33	−13	28 (Note: 4 points deducted.)	Relegated to Liga Alef

== See also ==
- 1988–89 Liga Leumit
