= 1999–2000 Liga Leumit =

Israeli football season

The 1999–2000 Liga Leumit season was the first in which Liga Leumit was Israeli football's second tier, following the establishment of the Israeli Premier League in the summer of 1999. Due to the ongoing restructuring, the league had only 10 clubs (expanded to 12 the next season as three clubs were relegated from the Premier League and only one promoted).

Maccabi Jaffa started the season in Liga Leumit, but a failure to have their budget approved by the Israel Football Association led to them being replaced by Bnei Sakhnin (who had finished 9th the previous season and had been relegated to the third tier) soon after the season started, with Maccabi Jaffa dropping into Liga Alef, the fourth tier. Jaffa's results were all annulled and Sakhnin took over their fixtures, replaying the ones Jaffa had already played.

Tzafririm Holon won the title and were promoted, whilst Hapoel Ashkelon finished bottom and were relegated to Liga Artzit. Holon's Danny Nir'on was the league's top scorer with 23 goals.

== Final table ==
Pos	Team	Pld	W	D	L	GF	GA	GD	Pts	Promotion or relegation
1	Tzafririm Holon	36	19	9	8	57	33	+24	66	Promoted to Premier League
2	Maccabi Kiryat Gat	36	18	8	10	52	28	+24	62	
3	Maccabi Acre	36	17	8	11	58	46	+12	59	
4	Bnei Sakhnin	36	13	11	12	51	49	+2	50	
5	Beitar Avraham Be'er Sheva	36	14	6	16	39	43	−4	48	
6	Hakoah Ramat Gan	36	13	7	16	54	61	−7	46	
7	Hapoel Be'er Sheva	36	11	12	13	38	35	+3	44 (Note: 1 point deducted for violating budget rules.)	
8	Hapoel Beit She'an	36	11	9	16	45	59	−14	42	
9	Maccabi Ahi Nazareth	36	10	11	15	41	56	−15	41	
10	Hapoel Ashkelon	36	9	9	18	32	57	−25	34 (Note: 2 points deducted for violating budget rules.)	Relegated to Liga Artzit

Source: rsssf.com
