= 2004–05 Liga Leumit =

Israeli football season

The 2004–05 Liga Leumit season saw Hapoel Kfar Saba win the title and promotion to the Premier League. Runners-up Maccabi Netanya were also promoted.

Maccabi Ahi Nazareth (who had been relegated from the Premier League the previous season) and Tzafririm Holon were relegated to Liga Artzit.

== Final table ==
Pos	Team	Pld	W	D	L	GF	GA	GD	Pts	Promotion or relegation
1	Hapoel Kfar Saba	33	15	11	7	40	27	+13	56	Promoted to Premier League
2	Maccabi Netanya	33	14	11	8	44	31	+13	53	Promoted to Premier League
3	Hapoel Acre	33	14	7	12	52	45	+7	49	
4	Hapoel Jerusalem	33	14	6	13	39	41	−2	47 (Note: One point deducted.)	
5	Hakoah Ramat Gan	33	12	10	11	31	33	−2	46	
6	Ironi Rishon LeZion	33	11	12	10	36	36	0	45	
7	Maccabi Herzliya	33	11	12	10	31	31	0	45	
8	Ironi Kiryat Shmona	33	11	11	11	39	41	−2	44	
9	Hapoel Ra'anana	33	11	8	14	37	40	−3	41	
10	Ironi Nir Ramat HaSharon	33	10	11	12	33	39	−6	40	
11	Maccabi Ahi Nazareth	33	8	16	9	38	38	0	38 (Note: Two points deducted.)	Relegated to Liga Artzit
12	Tzafririm Holon	33	6	7	20	30	48	−18	25	Relegated to Liga Artzit

Source: rsssf.com
