= Shmulik Levi =

Israeli footballer (born 1972)

Shmulik Levi שמוליק לוי
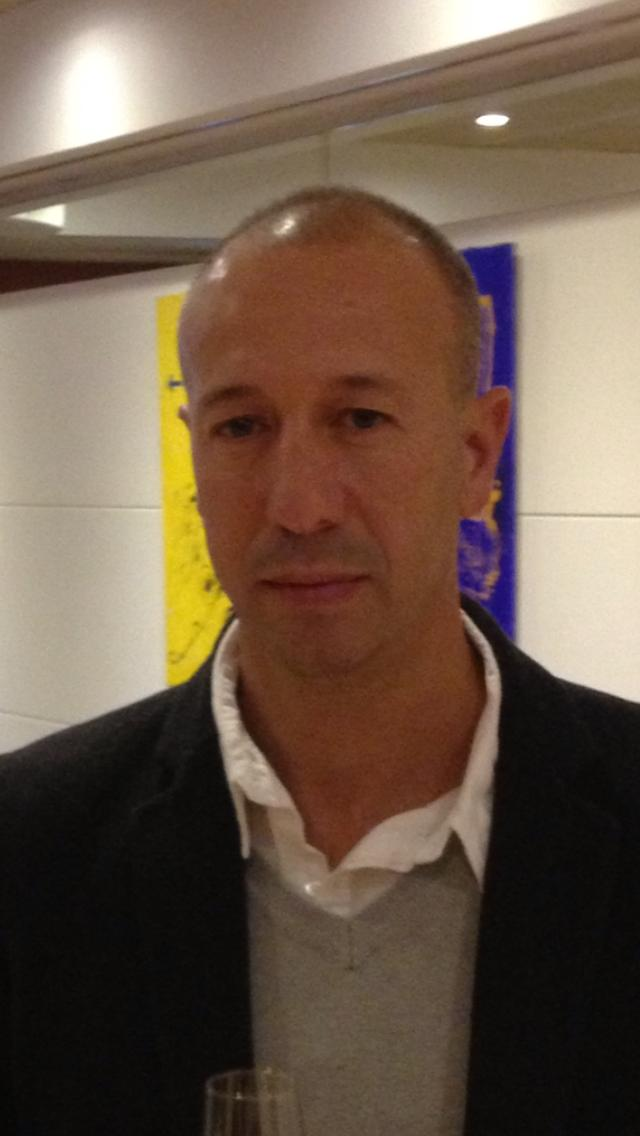

Personal information
- Full name: Shmuel Levi
- Date of birth: 9 June 1972 (age 54)
- Place of birth: Jerusalem, Israel
- Height: 1.78 m (5 ft 10 in)
- Position: Right back

Youth career
- 1984–1987: Beitar Jerusalem

Senior career*
Years	Team	Apps	(Gls)
1987–2001	Beitar Jerusalem	218	(15)

International career
1992–1993	Israel U21	8	(0)
1997	Israel	1	(0)
- * Club domestic league appearances and goals

Shmulik Levi (Hebrew: שמוליק לוי; born 9 June 1972) is an Israeli former footballer. His father Avraham Levi is a former Beitar Jerusalem's director.

== Career ==
Levi signed to the Beitar Jerusalem's youth team when he was 12 years. In 1987–88 he joined to the senior team when he was 16 years old. In 1997 became the club's captain.

Levi won with Beitar at 3 championships and once in Toto Cup.

== Honours ==
Beitar Jerusalem

- Israel championship: 1992–93, 1996–97, 1997–98
