= Oren Zeitouni =

Israeli footballer

Oren Zeitouni אורן זיתוני
Personal information
- Full name: Oren Zeitouni
- Date of birth: February 18, 1976 (age 50)
- Place of birth: Holon, Israel
- Height: 1.83 m (6 ft 0 in)
- Position: Defensive midfielder

Youth career
- Maccabi Tel Aviv
- Tzafririm Holon

Senior career*
Years	Team	Apps	(Gls)
1993–1997	Tzafririm Holon	66	(0)
1997–2001	Hapoel Haifa	128	(6)
2001–2005	Maccabi Tel Aviv	62	(0)
2005–2006	Hapoel Nazareth Illit	13	(0)
2006	Maccabi Netanya	1	(0)

International career^{‡}
	Israel U-21	11	(?)
1999–2003	Israel	15	(0)
- * Club domestic league appearances and goals as of 17 December 2006 ‡ National team caps and goals as of 17 December 2006

Oren Zeitouni, (Hebrew: אורן זיתוני; born February 18, 1976) is a former Israeli footballer. He most recently played for Maccabi Netanya in the Israeli Premier League, but has been forced to retire because of injury.

== Playing career ==
He began in the youth system of Maccabi Tel Aviv but at age 15, he switched to Hapoel Tzafririm Holon. It was at the later where he made his first team debut in the 1993-94 season against Maccabi Petah Tikva.

== Honours ==
- Israeli Premier League (2):
  - 1998-99, 2002–03
- Toto Cup (1):
  - 2000-01
- Israel State Cup (1):
  - 2005
