= 2003–04 Liga Leumit =

Football season

The 2003–04 Liga Leumit season saw Hapoel Haifa win the title and promotion to the Premier League. Runners-up Hapoel Nazareth Illit were also promoted to the Premier League for the first time in their history.

Bottom-placed Hapoel Ramat Gan were relegated to Liga Artzit. Tzafririm Holon were also due to be relegated, but were reprieved after Maccabi Kiryat Gat were demoted to Liga Alef due to financial difficulties.

== Final table ==
| Pos | Team | Pld | W | D | L | GF | GA | GD | Pts | Promotion or relegation |
|---|---|---|---|---|---|---|---|---|---|---|
| 1 | Hapoel Haifa | 33 | 16 | 7 | 10 | 44 | 32 | +12 | 55 | Promoted to Premier League |
| 2 | Hapoel Nazareth Illit | 33 | 14 | 12 | 7 | 49 | 29 | +20 | 54 | Promoted to Premier League |
| 3 | Ironi Kiryat Shmona | 33 | 13 | 15 | 5 | 49 | 32 | +17 | 54 | |
| 4 | Hapoel Kfar Saba | 33 | 14 | 12 | 7 | 45 | 32 | +13 | 53 (Note: 1 point deducted.) | |
| 5 | Hapoel Ra'anana | 33 | 14 | 7 | 12 | 48 | 41 | +7 | 49 | |
| 6 | Hapoel Jerusalem | 33 | 10 | 13 | 10 | 30 | 37 | −7 | 43 | |
| 7 | Maccabi Kiryat Gat | 33 | 9 | 13 | 11 | 30 | 37 | −7 | 40 | Relegated to Liga Alef |
| 8 | Hakoah Ramat Gan | 33 | 10 | 9 | 14 | 32 | 37 | −5 | 39 | |
| 9 | Maccabi Herzliya | 33 | 8 | 15 | 10 | 34 | 39 | −5 | 39 | |
| 10 | Ironi Rishon LeZion | 33 | 9 | 9 | 15 | 31 | 42 | −11 | 36 | |
| 11 | Tzafririm Holon | 33 | 8 | 12 | 13 | 26 | 42 | −16 | 36 | |
| 12 | Hapoel Ramat Gan | 33 | 6 | 10 | 17 | 29 | 47 | −18 | 28 | Relegated to Liga Artzit |

Source: rsssf.com
