= 1990–91 Liga Artzit =

The 1990–91 Liga Artzit season saw Maccabi Petah Tikva win the title and earn promotion to Liga Leumit alongside runners-up Maccabi Yavne. At the other end of the table Maccabi Ramat Amidar and Hapoel Tirat HaCarmel were relegated to Liga Alef, whilst Hapoel Bat Yam were relegated after losing the promotion-relegation play-offs.

== Final table ==
Pos	Team	Pld	W	D	L	GF	GA	GD	Pts	Promotion or relegation
1	Maccabi Petah Tikva	30	19	7	4	73	27	+46	64	Promoted to Liga Leumit
2	Maccabi Yavne	30	16	9	5	38	24	+14	57	Promoted to Liga Leumit
3	Hapoel Ramat Gan	30	15	6	9	61	39	+22	51	
4	Ironi Ashdod	30	12	9	9	44	36	+8	45	
5	Shimshon Tel Aviv	30	12	9	9	40	34	+6	45	
6	Maccabi Sha'arayim	30	12	7	11	35	29	+6	43	
7	Maccabi Jaffa	30	10	11	9	44	41	+3	41	
8	Hapoel Ashdod	30	10	11	9	37	37	0	41	
9	Hapoel Hadera	30	10	10	10	32	39	−7	40	
10	Hapoel Haifa	30	10	9	11	25	33	−8	39	
11	Hapoel Tiberias	30	9	8	13	36	49	−13	35	
12	Beitar Netanya	30	9	7	14	36	43	−7	34	
13	Maccabi Acre	30	9	7	14	23	36	−13	34	
14	Hapoel Bat Yam	30	5	15	10	28	40	−12	30	Relegation play-off
15	Maccabi Ramat Amidar	30	8	6	16	32	59	−27	30	Relegated to Liga Alef
16	Hapoel Tirat HaCarmel	30	3	11	16	17	40	−23	20	Relegated to Liga Alef

== Promotion-relegation play-offs ==
Fourteenth-placed Hapoel Bat Yam had to play-off against Liga Alef play-off winners Hakoah Ramat Gan:

Hakoah Ramat Gan	2 – 1	Hapoel Bat Yam

The result meant that Hapoel Bat Yam were relegated.
