= 1989–90 Liga Artzit =

The 1989–90 Liga Artzit season in Israel saw Tzafririm Holon and Hapoel Tel Aviv promoted to Liga Leumit. At the other end of the table, Hapoel Rishon LeZion and Hapoel Lod were automatically relegated to Liga Alef, whilst Maccabi Tamra went down after losing the promotion-relegation play-offs. Maccabi Yavne's Benny Tabak was the league's top scorer with 19 goals.

== Final table ==
Pos	Team	Pld	W	D	L	GF	GA	GD	Pts	Promotion or relegation
1	Tzafririm Holon	30	17	9	4	54	24	+30	60	Promoted to Liga Leumit
2	Hapoel Tel Aviv	30	15	10	5	47	22	+25	55	Promoted to Liga Leumit
3	Maccabi Yavne	30	15	10	5	49	26	+23	55	
4	Maccabi Sha'arayim	30	13	12	5	36	21	+15	51	
5	Hapoel Tiberias	30	15	6	9	54	41	+13	51	
6	Maccabi Petah Tikva	30	12	11	7	31	21	+10	47	
7	Beitar Netanya	30	11	7	12	39	36	+3	40	
8	Maccabi Jaffa	30	10	8	12	33	39	−6	38	
9	Hapoel Haifa	30	8	11	11	28	37	−9	35	
10	Maccabi Ramat Amidar	30	9	8	13	23	36	−13	35	
11	Hapoel Tirat HaCarmel	30	8	10	12	24	33	−9	34	
12	Hapoel Bat Yam	30	7	13	10	33	44	−11	34	
13	Hapoel Hadera	30	8	9	13	37	46	−9	33	
14	Maccabi Tamra	30	7	12	11	25	34	−9	33	Relegation play-off
15	Hapoel Rishon LeZion	30	5	9	16	41	57	−16	24	Relegated to Liga Alef
16	Hapoel Lod	30	3	9	18	27	64	−37	18	Relegated to Liga Alef

Source: rsssf.com

== Promotion-relegation play-offs ==
14th-placed Maccabi Tamra had to play-off against Liga Alef play-off winners Ironi Ashdod:

Ironi Ashdod	1 – 0	Maccabi Tamra
	After extra time

The result meant that Tamra were relegated.
