= Nir Levine =

Israeli footballer (born 1962)

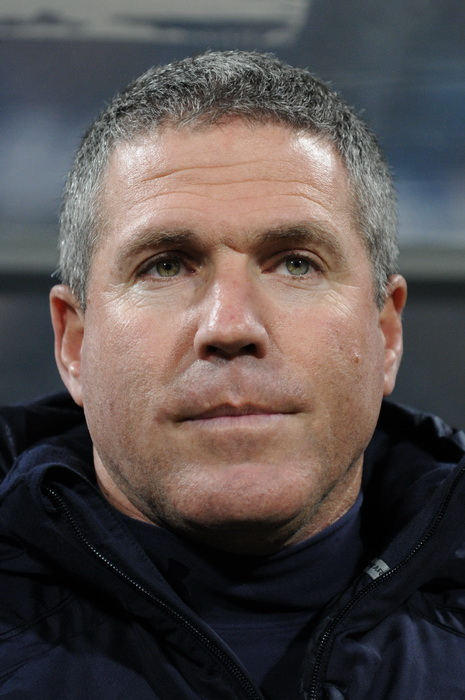

Personal information
- Date of birth: March 4, 1962 (age 64)
- Place of birth: Rehovot, Israel
- Height: 1.70 m (5 ft 7 in)
- Position: Striker

Youth career
- 1973–1976: Maccabi Rehovot
- 1976–1980: Hapoel Marmorek

Senior career*
| Years | Team | Apps | (Gls) |
| 1980–1984 | Hapoel Marmorek | 126 | (37) |
| 1984–1989 | Hapoel Petah Tikva | 146 | (61) |
| 1989–1990 | Gent | 18 | (1) |
| 1990–1993 | Hapoel Petah Tikva | 80 | (32) |
| 1993 | Bnei Yehuda | 15 | (1) |
| 1994 | Hapoel Jerusalem | 12 | (1) |
| 1994 | Maccabi Kiryat Gat | 8 | (1) |
| 1995 | Hapoel Ashkelon | 14 | (4) |

International career
| 1986–1990 | Israel | 16 | (6) |

Managerial career
- 1997–1998: Hapoel Petah Tikva
- 1998–1999: Ironi Ashdod
- 1999–2000: Hapoel Petah Tikva
- 2000: Tzafririm Holon
- 2000–2002: Maccabi Tel Aviv
- 2002: Hapoel Petah Tikva
- 2004–2005: Hapoel Haifa
- 2005: Hapoel Be'er Sheva
- 2005–2006: Hapoel Petah Tikva
- 2007: Hapoel Tel Aviv
- 2007–2008: Maccabi Tel Aviv
- 2008–2016: Maccabi Tel Aviv (youth director of football)
- 2009–2010: Maccabi Tel Aviv (assistant manager)
- 2011–2012: Maccabi Tel Aviv (caretaker manager)
- 2019–2021: Israel U21
Medal record
Representing Israel
Football
Maccabiah Games
| Gold medal – first place | 1985 Maccabiah | Football |
- * Club domestic league appearances and goals

Nir Levine (Hebrew: ניר לוין; born March 4, 1962) is an Israeli football manager and former player. He is a former caretaker manager of Maccabi Tel Aviv and former director of football of the Maccabi Tel Aviv youth team. In 2019 he was appointed as the coach of the Israel national under-21 football team. He currently serves as the sports director for Hapoel Petah Tikva.

== Career ==
Levine was born in Rehovot, Israel.

A striker, he played for Hapoel Marmorek, Hapoel Petah Tikva, K.A.A. Gent, Bnei Yehuda, Hapoel Jerusalem, Maccabi Kiryat Gat, and Hapoel Ashkelon, and at the 1985 Maccabiah Games Levine won a gold medal with Team Israel.

Levine has managed Hapoel Petah Tikva, Ironi Ashdod, Tzafririm Holon, Maccabi Tel Aviv, Hapoel Haifa, Hapoel Be'er Sheva, Hapoel Tel Aviv, and the Israel U21 national team.

From 2016 to 2019, Levine was the technical manager of the youth Israeli national teams. In March 2019 he was appointed as the coach of the Israel national under-21 football team.

== Honours ==
=== As player ===
- Toto Cup: 1985–86
- Israel State Cup: 1992

=== As coach ===
- Israel State Cup: 2001, 2002, 2007
