= 1990–91 Liga Leumit =

Liga Leumit
- Season: 1990–91
- Champions: Maccabi Haifa; 4th title
- Relegated: Beitar Jerusalem; Hapoel Kfar Saba
- Top goalscorer: Nir Levine (20)

The 1990–91 Liga Leumit season began in October 1990 and ended in June 1991, with Maccabi Haifa winning the title.

The regular season had each team play twice against each opponent. The table was then divided into two, with top six teams entering the championship play-off and bottom six in the relegation play-off, where each team played the other teams in the play-off twice.

Two teams from Liga Artzit were promoted at the end of the previous season: Tzafririm Holon and Hapoel Tel Aviv. The two teams relegated were Shimshon Tel Aviv and Hapoel Ramat Gan.

== Regular season ==
=== Table ===
Pos	Team	Pld	W	D	L	GF	GA	GD	Pts	Qualification
1	Maccabi Haifa	22	16	2	4	41	21	+20	50	Qualification for the championship round
2	Hapoel Petah Tikva	22	13	7	2	41	22	+19	46	Qualification for the championship round
3	Beitar Tel Aviv	22	10	6	6	28	21	+7	36	Qualification for the championship round
4	Maccabi Tel Aviv	22	8	7	7	31	31	0	31	Qualification for the championship round
5	Maccabi Netanya	22	8	6	8	28	19	+9	30	Qualification for the championship round
6	Hapoel Be'er Sheva	22	6	11	5	24	21	+3	29	Qualification for the championship round
7	Tzafririm Holon	22	6	8	8	25	27	−2	26	Qualification for the relegation round
8	Hapoel Jerusalem	22	6	7	9	20	27	−7	25	Qualification for the relegation round
9	Hapoel Tel Aviv	22	6	6	10	15	24	−9	24	Qualification for the relegation round
10	Bnei Yehuda	22	5	8	9	23	29	−6	23	Qualification for the relegation round
11	Beitar Jerusalem	22	7	2	13	15	28	−13	23	Qualification for the relegation round
12	Hapoel Kfar Saba	22	3	6	13	17	38	−21	15	Qualification for the relegation round

Source: EU-Football.info

=== Results ===
Home \ Away	BEI	BTA	BnY	HBS	HJE	HKS	HPT	HTA	MHA	MNE	MTA	TZH
Beitar Jerusalem	—	2–2	0–2	0–1	2–1	3–1	0–1	1–0	1–0	0–2	1–0	0–1
Beitar Tel Aviv	2–0	—	2–1	2–1	1–1	0–2	1–3	1–0	0–1	1–0	3–0	2–1
Bnei Yehuda	2–0	1–1	—	1–1	1–1	4–0	1–3	1–1	0–1	0–0	2–3	2–2
Hapoel Be'er Sheva	2–0	0–0	1–1	—	1–1	1–1	0–0	2–0	1–3	1–0	1–1	2–2
Hapoel Jerusalem	2–0	1–2	2–0	0–0	—	3–1	1–1	1–0	0–1	1–0	0–3	1–1
Hapoel Kfar Saba	0–2	0–3	1–0	0–1	0–1	—	1–2	2–1	2–4	1–2	0–3	2–2
Hapoel Petah Tikva	1–0	0–0	4–1	2–1	1–1	3–1	—	6–2	2–1	2–2	2–2	0–0
Hapoel Tel Aviv	1–0	1–0	1–0	1–1	1–0	0–0	2–3	—	0–1	1–0	0–0	0–0
Maccabi Haifa	4–0	3–2	4–0	0–0	3–0	0–0	2–1	2–1	—	1–0	5–1	2–1
Maccabi Netanya	0–0	1–0	0–1	4–3	3–0	1–1	1–2	2–0	5–0	—	2–2	3–1
Maccabi Tel Aviv	3–2	1–2	1–1	1–3	3–2	0–0	0–1	0–0	3–0	1–0	—	1–3
Tzafririm Holon	0–1	1–1	0–1	1–0	2–0	2–1	2–1	1–2	1–3	0–0	1–2	—

Legend: Blue = home team win; Yellow = draw; Red = away team win.

== Playoffs ==
=== Top playoff ===
==== Table ====
Pos	Team	Pld	W	D	L	GF	GA	GD	Pts	Qualification
1	Maccabi Haifa (C)	32	22	5	5	56	28	+28	71	Qualification for the Intertoto Cup
2	Hapoel Petah Tikva	32	20	10	2	63	27	+36	70	Qualification for the Intertoto Cup
3	Beitar Tel Aviv	32	14	8	10	47	40	+7	50	
4	Maccabi Netanya	32	10	10	12	41	39	+2	40	
5	Maccabi Tel Aviv	32	9	11	12	43	53	−10	38	
6	Hapoel Be'er Sheva	32	6	15	11	34	39	−5	33	

Source: EU-Football.info
(C) Champions

==== Results ====
Home \ Away	BTA	HBS	HPT	MHA	MNE	MTA
Beitar Tel Aviv	—	2–1	1–4	0–1	2–3	1–1
Hapoel Be'er Sheva	1–1	—	0–0	1–2	2–2	1–1
Hapoel Petah Tikva	4–3	3–0	—	0–0	4–0	2–1
Maccabi Haifa	1–2	1–0	0–0	—	0–0	3–2
Maccabi Netanya	2–3	3–2	0–2	1–3	—	2–2
Maccabi Tel Aviv	1–4	3–2	0–3	1–4	0–0	—

Legend: Blue = home team win; Yellow = draw; Red = away team win.

=== Bottom playoff ===
==== Table ====
Pos	Team	Pld	W	D	L	GF	GA	GD	Pts	Relegation
7	Hapoel Tel Aviv	32	13	8	11	32	31	+1	47	
8	Bnei Yehuda	32	10	11	11	41	40	+1	41	
9	Tzafririm Holon	32	9	11	12	35	42	−7	38	
10	Hapoel Jerusalem	32	9	11	12	31	38	−7	38	
11	Beitar Jerusalem (R)	32	8	4	20	25	46	−21	28	Relegation to Liga Artzit
12	Hapoel Kfar Saba (R)	32	6	8	18	30	55	−25	26	Relegation to Liga Artzit

Source: EU-Football.info
(R) Relegated

==== Results ====
Home \ Away	BEI	BnY	HJE	HKS	HPT	TZH
Beitar Jerusalem	—	3–0	0–1	1–2	1–2	0–2
Bnei Yehuda	3–1	—	2–0	2–1	2–0	5–0
Hapoel Jerusalem	2–2	3–1	—	1–0	0–0	0–0
Hapoel Kfar Saba	2–0	1–1	3–3	—	1–4	1–3
Hapoel Tel Aviv	2–0	1–1	2–1	2–0	—	2–1
Tzafririm Holon	2–2	1–1	1–0	0–2	0–2	—

Legend: Blue = home team win; Yellow = draw; Red = away team win.

== Top scorers ==
(Israel) Nir Levine (Hapoel Petah Tikva) - 20
(Israel) Reuven Atar (Maccabi Haifa) - 15
(Israel) Yigal Menahem (Maccabi Haifa) - 13
