= 2001–02 Liga Leumit =

Israeli football season

The 2001–02 Liga Leumit season saw Hapoel Kfar Saba and Bnei Yehuda promoted to the Israeli Premier League. Hapoel Beit She'an were relegated to Liga Artzit alongside Hakoah Ramat Gan, who, despite finishing seventh, were demoted due to their financial problems, reprieving 11th-placed Tzafririm Holon. Lior Asulin of Maccabi Herzliya was the league's top scorer with 28 goals.

== Final table ==
| Pos | Team | Pld | W | D | L | GF | GA | GD | Pts | Promotion or relegation |
|---|---|---|---|---|---|---|---|---|---|---|
| 1 | Hapoel Kfar Saba | 33 | 18 | 9 | 6 | 57 | 23 | +34 | 63 | Promoted to Premier League |
| 2 | Bnei Yehuda | 33 | 16 | 13 | 4 | 58 | 30 | +28 | 61 | Promoted to Premier League |
| 3 | Maccabi Herzliya | 33 | 17 | 8 | 8 | 69 | 46 | +23 | 59 | |
| 4 | Beitar Avraham Be'er Sheva | 33 | 14 | 8 | 11 | 53 | 41 | +12 | 50 | |
| 5 | Maccabi Kafr Kanna | 33 | 12 | 9 | 12 | 50 | 43 | +7 | 45 | |
| 6 | Bnei Sakhnin | 33 | 11 | 8 | 14 | 32 | 41 | −9 | 41 | |
| 7 | Hakoah Ramat Gan | 33 | 10 | 11 | 12 | 27 | 36 | −9 | 41 | Relegated to Liga Artzit |
| 8 | Maccabi Ahi Nazareth | 33 | 10 | 12 | 11 | 47 | 51 | −4 | 39 (Note: Three points deducted for violating budget rules.) | |
| 9 | Hapoel Ra'anana | 33 | 9 | 11 | 13 | 40 | 52 | −12 | 38 | |
| 10 | Hapoel Ramat Gan | 33 | 11 | 4 | 18 | 31 | 51 | −20 | 37 | |
| 11 | Tzafririm Holon | 33 | 8 | 11 | 14 | 31 | 46 | −15 | 35 | |
| 12 | Hapoel Beit She'an | 33 | 6 | 8 | 19 | 26 | 61 | −35 | 26 | Relegated to Liga Artzit |

Source: rsssf.com
