= 1987–88 Liga Leumit =

Liga Leumit
- Season: 1987–88
- Champions: Hapoel Tel Aviv; 10th title
- Relegated: Hapoel Lod; Maccabi Petah Tikva
- Top goalscorer: Zahi Armeli (25)

The 1987–88 Liga Leumit season saw the league experiment with a split-league system. After the first two rounds (26 matches), the league split, with the top eight clubs forming a Championship group and the bottom six forming a Relegation group. Within the groups, the clubs played each other once more.

Hapoel Tel Aviv won the title whilst Hapoel Lod and Maccabi Petah Tikva were relegated to Liga Artzit. Zahi Armeli of Maccabi Haifa was the league's top scorer with 25 goals.

The following season the league continued to use the split league system, but had six clubs in the Championship group and eight in the Relegation group.

== Regular season ==
=== Table ===
Pos	Team	Pld	W	D	L	GF	GA	GD	Pts	Qualification
1	Hapoel Tel Aviv	26	14	7	5	30	18	+12	49	Qualification for the championship round
2	Maccabi Netanya	26	13	8	5	42	28	+14	47	Qualification for the championship round
3	Shimshon Tel Aviv	26	10	11	5	31	21	+10	41	Qualification for the championship round
4	Hapoel Kfar Saba	26	10	10	6	29	25	+4	40	Qualification for the championship round
5	Hapoel Petah Tikva	26	10	8	8	37	33	+4	38	Qualification for the championship round
6	Hapoel Be'er Sheva	26	9	11	6	21	17	+4	38	Qualification for the championship round
7	Beitar Tel Aviv	26	8	12	6	31	23	+8	36	Qualification for the championship round
8	Tzafririm Holon	26	7	12	7	25	23	+2	33	Qualification for the championship round
9	Maccabi Haifa	26	8	8	10	32	29	+3	32	Qualification for the relegation round
10	Bnei Yehuda	26	7	11	8	21	18	+3	32	Qualification for the relegation round
11	Beitar Jerusalem	26	8	8	10	32	36	−4	32	Qualification for the relegation round
12	Maccabi Tel Aviv	26	6	11	9	33	29	+4	29	Qualification for the relegation round
13	Hapoel Lod	26	3	9	14	16	56	−40	18	Qualification for the relegation round
14	Maccabi Petah Tikva	26	2	8	16	15	39	−24	14	Qualification for the relegation round

Source: EU-Football.info

=== Results ===
Home \ Away	BEI	BTA	BnY	HBS	HKS	HLD	HPT	HTA	MHA	MNE	MPT	MTA	STA	TZH
Beitar Jerusalem	—	0–4	1–1	2–1	2–1	4–3	0–0	1–1	2–3	2–1	1–2	3–3	1–1	0–1
Beitar Tel Aviv	2–1	—	1–0	2–1	0–2	1–1	1–1	0–2	1–0	0–0	2–0	1–1	0–1	1–1
Bnei Yehuda	0–1	0–0	—	0–1	3–0	2–0	2–2	0–2	3–2	0–0	1–1	0–0	1–2	0–0
Hapoel Be'er Sheva	0–0	1–1	0–0	—	2–0	2–1	1–1	1–0	0–1	0–0	3–1	0–0	0–0	2–0
Hapoel Kfar Saba	1–0	1–1	1–3	0–0	—	3–0	1–0	1–0	1–0	5–1	1–0	1–1	0–0	2–2
Hapoel Lod	1–0	0–4	0–0	0–0	1–1	—	1–1	0–0	0–3	1–6	1–0	1–0	1–1	1–1
Hapoel Petah Tikva	2–1	2–1	2–0	1–0	1–2	4–0	—	0–1	1–1	0–1	2–1	2–1	5–2	2–0
Hapoel Tel Aviv	2–1	1–0	0–0	0–0	2–0	2–0	3–1	—	1–5	1–1	1–0	1–1	0–1	2–1
Maccabi Haifa	1–1	0–2	0–0	0–1	2–2	3–0	1–2	1–2	—	2–1	2–0	1–0	1–1	1–1
Maccabi Netanya	1–3	1–0	1–0	3–1	0–0	4–1	4–2	1–0	3–0	—	1–0	1–0	1–3	1–1
Maccabi Petah Tikva	2–2	1–1	0–3	0–1	0–2	1–1	1–1	0–2	1–1	1–3	—	0–0	0–2	0–1
Maccabi Tel Aviv	1–2	2–2	1–0	1–2	3–0	5–1	4–1	1–2	1–1	2–2	3–1	—	2–1	0–1
Shimshon Tel Aviv	1–0	1–1	0–1	3–1	0–0	4–0	1–1	0–0	1–0	1–2	1–1	2–0	—	0–0
Tzafririm Holon	0–1	2–2	0–1	0–0	1–1	4–0	2–0	1–2	1–0	2–2	0–1	0–0	2–1	—

Legend: Blue = home team win; Yellow = draw; Red = away team win.

== Playoffs ==
=== Top playoff ===
==== Table ====
Pos	Team	Pld	W	D	L	GF	GA	GD	Pts	Qualification
1	Hapoel Tel Aviv (C)	33	19	9	5	43	23	+20	66	
2	Maccabi Netanya	33	16	12	5	56	35	+21	60	
3	Hapoel Be'er Sheva	33	13	13	7	33	22	+11	52	
4	Shimshon Tel Aviv	33	13	11	9	35	33	+2	50	Qualification for the Intertoto Cup
5	Hapoel Petah Tikva	33	12	10	11	47	41	+6	46	
6	Hapoel Kfar Saba	33	11	12	10	33	31	+2	45	
7	Beitar Tel Aviv	33	9	13	11	38	40	−2	40	
8	Tzafririm Holon	33	9	13	11	32	34	−2	40	

Source: EU-Football.info
(C) Champions

==== Results ====
Home \ Away	BTA	HBS	HKS	HPT	HTA	MNE	STA	TZH
Beitar Tel Aviv	—	—	—	1–5	0–2	—	1–2	—
Hapoel Be'er Sheva	2–1	—	0–0	—	—	1–1	—	—
Hapoel Kfar Saba	1–2	—	—	2–0	—	1–1	—	0–1
Hapoel Petah Tikva	—	1–2	—	—	1–1	—	2–0	—
Hapoel Tel Aviv	—	2–1	1–0	—	—	1–1	—	4–2
Maccabi Netanya	2–2	—	—	2–1	—	—	3–0	4–1
Shimshon Tel Aviv	—	0–4	1–0	—	0–2	—	—	1–0
Tzafririm Holon	3–0	0–2	—	0–0	—	—	—	—

Legend: Blue = home team win; Yellow = draw; Red = away team win.

=== Bottom playoff ===
==== Table ====
Pos	Team	Pld	W	D	L	GF	GA	GD	Pts	Qualification or relegation
9	Maccabi Haifa	31	13	8	10	56	33	+23	47	
10	Bnei Yehuda	31	11	11	9	28	23	+5	44	
11	Beitar Jerusalem	31	10	9	12	38	42	−4	39	Qualification for the Intertoto Cup
12	Maccabi Tel Aviv	31	8	12	11	43	43	0	36	
13	Hapoel Lod (R)	31	3	9	19	17	69	−52	18	Relegated to Liga Artzit
14	Maccabi Petah Tikva (R)	31	3	8	20	19	49	−30	17	Relegated to Liga Artzit

Source: EU-Football.info
(R) Relegated

==== Results ====
Home \ Away	BEI	BnY	HLD	MHA	MPT	MTA
Beitar Jerusalem	—	—	—	2–4	2–0	1–1
Bnei Yehuda	1–0	—	2–0	—	1–0	—
Hapoel Lod	0–1	—	—	0–4	—	—
Maccabi Haifa	—	4–1	—	—	2–1	10–0
Maccabi Petah Tikva	—	—	3–0	—	—	0–5
Maccabi Tel Aviv	—	1–2	3–1	—	—	—

Legend: Blue = home team win; Yellow = draw; Red = away team win.
