= 1987–88 Liga Artzit =

The 1987–88 Liga Artzit season saw Hapoel Jerusalem win the title and promotion to Liga Leumit. Runners-up Hapoel Tiberias were also promoted.

At the other end of the table, Hakoah Ramat Gan and Hapoel Acre were relegated to Liga Alef.

== Final table ==
=== Promotion group ===
Pos	Team	Pld	W	D	L	GF	GA	GD	Pts	Promotion
1	Hapoel Jerusalem	33	22	5	6	61	32	+29	71	Promoted to Liga Leumit
2	Hapoel Tiberias	33	19	7	7	69	43	+26	64	Promoted to Liga Leumit
3	Hapoel Haifa	33	18	8	7	32	23	+9	62	
4	Maccabi Yavne	33	16	8	9	38	30	+8	56	
5	Hapoel Hadera	33	13	8	12	50	45	+5	47	
6	Maccabi Sha'arayim	33	13	7	13	42	43	−1	46	
7	Hapoel Ramat Gan	33	11	8	14	31	36	−5	41	
8	Hapoel Yehud	33	8	12	13	43	52	−9	36	

=== Relegation group ===
Pos	Team	Pld	W	D	L	GF	GA	GD	Pts	Relegation
9	Maccabi Jaffa	31	9	10	12	34	37	−3	37	
10	Maccabi Ramat Amidar	31	9	9	13	34	42	−8	36	
11	Hapoel Bat Yam	31	8	11	12	34	39	−5	35	
12	Beitar Netanya	31	9	6	16	32	47	−15	33	
13	Hakoah Ramat Gan	31	8	6	17	27	36	−9	30	Relegated to Liga Alef
14	Hapoel Acre	31	6	7	18	24	46	−22	25	Relegated to Liga Alef

== See also ==
- 1987–88 Liga Leumit
