= 1988–89 Liga Leumit =

Liga Leumit
- Season: 1988–89
- Champions: Maccabi Haifa; 3rd title
- Relegated: Hapoel Tiberias; Tzafririm Holon; Hapoel Tel Aviv
- Top goalscorer: Benny Tabak (18)

The 1988–89 Liga Leumit season began in September 1988 and ended in June 1989. After the first two rounds of matches (26 matches) the league split into two groups; a Championship group of six clubs and a Relegation group of eight clubs, who played the other clubs in their group once more.

Maccabi Haifa won their third title, whilst Hapoel Tiberias, Tzafririm Holon and Hapoel Tel Aviv (a year after winning the title) were all relegated. Benny Tabak of Maccabi Tel Aviv was the league's top scorer with 18 goals.

== Regular season ==
=== Table ===
Pos	Team	Pld	W	D	L	GF	GA	GD	Pts	Qualification
1	Maccabi Netanya	26	14	7	5	35	25	+10	49	Qualification for the championship round
2	Maccabi Haifa (Note: Two points deducted for violating budget rules.)	26	12	13	1	41	16	+25	47	Qualification for the championship round
3	Hapoel Petah Tikva	26	12	9	5	28	19	+9	43	Qualification for the championship round
4	Beitar Tel Aviv	26	10	9	7	24	22	+2	39	Qualification for the championship round
5	Hapoel Be'er Sheva	26	10	9	7	19	18	+1	39	Qualification for the championship round
6	Shimshon Tel Aviv	26	8	12	6	25	20	+5	36	Qualification for the championship round
7	Hapoel Jerusalem (Note: One point deducted for violating budget rules.)	26	9	9	8	20	19	+1	35	Qualification for the relegation round
8	Beitar Jerusalem	26	9	5	12	28	31	−3	32	Qualification for the relegation round
9	Maccabi Tel Aviv	26	7	10	9	30	34	−4	29	Qualification for the relegation round
10	Hapoel Kfar Saba	26	6	10	10	21	29	−8	28	Qualification for the relegation round
11	Tzafririm Holon	26	6	9	11	27	28	−1	25	Qualification for the relegation round
12	Bnei Yehuda	26	4	13	9	21	23	−2	25	Qualification for the relegation round
13	Hapoel Tel Aviv (Note: Four points deducted for violating budget rules.)	26	6	8	12	24	37	−13	22	Qualification for the relegation round
14	Hapoel Tiberias	26	5	5	16	20	42	−22	20	Qualification for the relegation round

Source: EU-Football.info

=== Results ===
Home \ Away	BEI	BTA	BnY	HBS	HJE	HKS	HPT	HTA	HTI	MHA	MNE	MTA	STA	TZH
Beitar Jerusalem	—	1–1	2–0	0–1	0–2	2–0	3–0	0–1	2–1	2–2	1–2	0–4	0–1	1–1
Beitar Tel Aviv	1–3	—	2–4	0–1	1–0	0–0	1–0	1–0	4–0	0–2	1–2	2–1	1–3	1–0
Bnei Yehuda	0–3	1–2	—	2–0	0–0	0–0	0–0	0–0	0–1	0–0	1–1	4–0	0–0	1–2
Hapoel Be'er Sheva	0–1	0–1	1–0	—	3–1	0–0	0–0	2–1	1–0	0–0	0–1	1–0	0–0	1–0
Hapoel Jerusalem	1–2	1–1	0–0	0–1	—	2–1	0–0	0–1	2–0	0–0	1–0	1–0	1–1	1–0
Hapoel Kfar Saba	1–2	0–1	1–0	2–2	0–1	—	1–2	0–0	2–1	1–1	1–1	1–0	1–1	2–1
Hapoel Petah Tikva	1–0	0–0	0–0	0–0	1–1	3–0	—	3–1	0–1	2–0	1–1	2–1	2–0	3–2
Hapoel Tel Aviv	3–1	1–1	1–1	1–1	0–2	1–3	0–1	—	3–0	1–4	1–2	1–1	2–1	1–1
Hapoel Tiberias	1–0	0–0	1–4	1–3	3–1	2–0	0–1	1–2	—	0–3	1–1	1–3	0–0	0–0
Maccabi Haifa	0–0	0–0	3–1	0–0	1–1	2–2	3–0	2–0	2–1	—	2–0	5–0	1–1	1–0
Maccabi Netanya	1–0	1–0	1–0	1–0	2–0	1–0	2–1	3–1	2–2	1–3	—	1–1	2–3	3–1
Maccabi Tel Aviv	2–2	0–0	1–1	4–0	1–0	3–1	0–2	0–0	1–0	1–1	1–1	—	1–1	2–2
Shimshon Tel Aviv	1–0	0–1	0–0	1–0	0–0	0–0	2–2	5–1	2–0	1–2	0–2	0–1	—	1–0
Tzafririm Holon	3–0	1–1	1–1	1–1	0–1	0–1	0–1	1–0	3–2	1–1	2–0	4–1	0–0	—

Legend: Blue = home team win; Yellow = draw; Red = away team win.

== Playoffs ==
=== Top playoff ===
==== Table ====
Pos	Team	Pld	W	D	L	GF	GA	GD	Pts	Qualification
1	Maccabi Haifa (Note: Two points deducted for violating budget rules.) (C)	31	15	14	2	49	19	+30	57	
2	Hapoel Petah Tikva	31	15	11	5	36	20	+16	54	Qualification for the Intertoto Cup
3	Maccabi Netanya	31	14	10	7	36	33	+3	52	
4	Beitar Tel Aviv	31	13	9	9	34	27	+7	48	Qualification for the Intertoto Cup
5	Hapoel Be'er Sheva	31	11	10	10	22	29	−7	43	
6	Shimshon Tel Aviv	31	9	13	9	28	25	+3	40	

Source: EU-Football.info
(C) Champions

==== Results ====
Home \ Away	BTA	HBS	HPT	MHA	MNE	STA
Beitar Tel Aviv	—	4–1	—	1–0	—	—
Hapoel Be'er Sheva	—	—	0–3	—	1–1	—
Hapoel Petah Tikva	2–0	—	—	—	0–0	2–0
Maccabi Haifa	—	3–0	1–1	—	—	2–1
Maccabi Netanya	0–5	—	—	0–2	—	0–0
Shimshon Tel Aviv	2–0	0–1	—	—	—	—

Legend: Blue = home team win; Yellow = draw; Red = away team win.

=== Bottom playoff ===
==== Table ====
Pos	Team	Pld	W	D	L	GF	GA	GD	Pts	Relegation
7	Hapoel Jerusalem (Note: One point deducted for violating budget rules.)	33	12	11	10	28	27	+1	46	
8	Maccabi Tel Aviv (Note: Two points deducted for violating budget rules.)	33	11	11	11	44	44	0	42	
9	Beitar Jerusalem	33	12	6	15	42	44	−2	42	
10	Hapoel Kfar Saba	33	10	11	12	33	38	−5	41	
11	Bnei Yehuda	33	8	14	11	31	29	+2	38	
12	Hapoel Tiberias (R)	33	9	5	19	31	52	−21	32	Relegated to Liga Artzit
13	Tzafririm Holon (R)	33	7	9	17	30	39	−9	28	Relegated to Liga Artzit
14	Hapoel Tel Aviv (Note: Four points deducted for violating budget rules.) (R)	33	8	8	17	33	51	−18	28	Relegated to Liga Artzit

Source: EU-Football.info
(R) Relegated

==== Results ====
Home \ Away	BEI	BnY	HJE	HKS	HTA	HTI	MTA	TZH
Beitar Jerusalem	—	—	—	—	3–1	1–2	3–0	4–1
Bnei Yehuda	4–2	—	—	4–0	1–0	—	—	—
Hapoel Jerusalem	1–1	0–0	—	2–1	—	2–1	—	—
Hapoel Kfar Saba	4–0	—	—	—	2–0	1–0	—	1–0
Hapoel Tel Aviv	—	—	1–2	—	—	—	3–2	3–0
Hapoel Tiberias	—	3–0	—	—	4–1	—	—	1–0
Maccabi Tel Aviv	—	1–0	2–1	3–3	—	5–0	—	—
Tzafririm Holon	—	0–1	2–0	—	—	—	0–1	—

Legend: Blue = home team win; Yellow = draw; Red = away team win.
