= Hapoel Marmorek F.C. =

Israeli football club

Hapoel Marmorek Haim
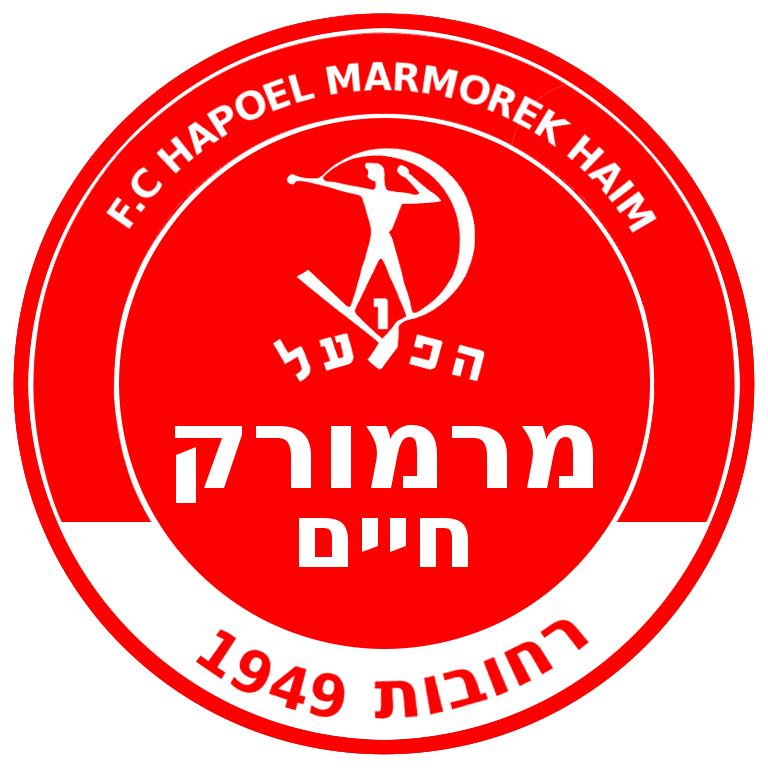
- Full name: Hapoel Marmorek Haim Rehovot Football Club מועדון הכדורגל הפועל מרמורק חיים רחובות
- Nickname: Yemeni aristocracy
- Founded: 1949
- Ground: Rehovot Stadium, Rehovot
- Capacity: 6000
- Chairman: Israel Abargil
- Manager: Daniel Tolmasov
- League: Liga Alef South
- 2024–25: Liga Alef South, 11th of 16
Home colours	Away colours

Hapoel Marmorek Rehovot F.C (Hebrew: הפועל מרמורק רחובות), commonly known as Hapoel Marmorek, is an Israeli football club based in Rehovot. They are currently in Liga Alef South, the third level of Israeli football. Home matches are played at the Rehovot Stadium.

== History ==
The club founded in 1949, and played by the early 1960s in Liga Bet, which by then was the third tier of Israeli football. in the 1962–63 season the club promoted to Liga Alef after finished third in Liga Bet South B.

In the summer of 1968, the club merged with fellow Rehovot club, Hapoel Rehovot, and the club became officially known since the merger as Hapoel Marmorek-Rehovot.

In the 1971–72 season, the club won the South Division of Liga Alef and promoted to the top flight of Israeli football, Liga Leumit, for the first time in their history. however, they finished bottom in their first season in the top flight, and were relegated back to Liga Alef.

The club played in Liga Alef until the 1975–76 season and finished only in the thirteenth place, which was not enough to secure a place in the newly formed Liga Artzit, thus, the club relegated to the new Liga Alef (now as third tier).

Marmorek won Liga Alef South in the 1977–78 season and promoted to Liga Artzit, then relegated back to Liga Alef in the following season. they promoted once more to Liga Artzit after winning Liga Alef South in the 1982–83 season, and remained further four seasons in Liga Artzit, up until the 1986–87 season where they finished eleventh and had to play in the relegation play-offs. they clinched only one single point in the play-offs, after they draw with Maccabi Hadera, and lost to Hapoel Ramat Gan and Hapoel Bat Yam. thus, they were relegated to Liga Alef.

In the 1990s, the club relegated to Liga Bet, and following the creation of the Israeli Premier League which saw all the lower divisions demoted in the football pyramid, the club found itself in the fifth tier of Israeli football, in which the club won in the 1999–2000 season, and promoted back to Liga Alef. in 2002–03, the club finished second in Liga Alef South, and promoted to Liga Artzit (now as third tier) as the best runner-up of Liga Alef, thus, they replaced Beitar Be'er Sheva, which were folded. the club continued to play in Liga Artzit until its final season, when they finished third, and secured a place in Liga Leumit for the following season, and by that, made a return to the second tier after 23 years. however, they finished bottom, winning only 2 matches out of 35, and relegated to Liga Alef, where they play today.

In the 2023–24 season, the team defeated Maccabi Sha'arayim 4-0 in the city derby, marking the largest derby victory in the history of meetings between the two clubs.

== Supporters ==
Hapoel Marmorek supporters during the Rehovot derby against Maccabi Sha'arayim

Hapoel Marmorek's supporters have historically been associated with the Marmorek neighborhood of Rehovot, where the club was founded. Since its establishment, a local supporter culture has developed around the club, identified with its red and white colours and its cross-city rivalry with Maccabi Sha'arayim.

The club's core group of supporters is known as "Yetzia HaSkhakh", ("The Canopy Stand"), a name derived from the canopy that covered part of the stands at the club's former Itztoni Ground. The group is characterized by its neighborhood-based identity and the close relationship between supporters, players and club officials.

The supporters' main rivalry is with those of Maccabi Sha'arayim in the Rehovot derby. The rivalry between the two clubs is also rooted in the historical development of the Marmorek and Sha'arayim neighborhoods as distinct communities within Rehovot, and has become a central element in the identity of both sets of supporters.

== Stadium ==
The club played at the Itstoni Stadium, which is named after former Marmorek player Tony Shar'abi. The stadium has a seated capacity of 1,500. In the 2026/2027 season, Hapoel Marmorek is scheduled to move to the new Rehovot Stadium (6000 seats), which will be its new home.

=== Current squad ===
No.	Position	Player	No.	Position	Player
55	GK	(Israel) Amit Azaria	17	MF	(Israel) Amit Fresko
1	GK	(Israel) Roy Eliyahu	18	MF	(Israel) Shneor Soffer
3	DF	(Israel) Elior Ashrov	21	MF	(Israel) Ori Agiv
4	DF	(Israel) Nur Levkovich	77	MF	(Israel) Liam Leshner
5	DF	(Israel) Yoav Ashkenazi	88	MF	(Israel) Harel Cohen
15	DF	(Israel) David Mantaev	9	FW	(Israel) Adi Haim Giat
20	DF	(Israel) Jeremy Strimling	10	FW	(Israel) Or Vobo
26	DF	(Israel) Liran Tubul	21	FW	(Israel) Eliya Biton
7	MF	(Israel) Raz Amir	25	FW	(Israel) Omer Hila
8	MF	(Israel) Kachal Yosef	30	FW	(Israel) Omri Atia
14	MF	(Israel) Gadi Assous			

== Honours ==
=== League ===
Honour	No.	Years
Second tier	1	1971–72
Third tier	3	1977–78, 1982–83, 2016–17
Fifth tier	1	1999–2000

=== Cup competitions ===
Honour	No.	Years
Toto Cup (third division)	1	2008–09
