= 2006–07 Liga Leumit =

Israeli football season

The 2006–07 Liga Leumit season began on 25 August 2006 and ended on 26 May 2007. Ironi Kiryat Shmona won the title and were promoted to the Premier League for the first time in their history. Runners-up Bnei Sakhnin were also promoted.

Hapoel Ashkelon (who reached the State Cup final) and Hapoel Jerusalem were relegated to Liga Artzit.

== Final table ==
Pos	Team	Pld	W	D	L	GF	GA	GD	Pts	Promotion or relegation
1	Ironi Kiryat Shmona	33	18	10	5	55	32	+23	64	Promoted to Premier League
2	Bnei Sakhnin	33	17	9	7	52	27	+25	60	Promoted to Premier League
3	Hapoel Haifa	33	14	5	14	43	43	0	47	
4	Hapoel Be'er Sheva	33	11	13	9	46	35	+11	45 (Note: 1 point deducted for breaking budget rules.)	
5	Hapoel Acre	33	12	8	13	38	46	−8	44	
6	Hapoel Ra'anana	33	10	12	11	34	31	+3	42	
7	Hapoel Nazareth Illit	33	10	12	11	32	36	−4	42	
8	Maccabi Ahi Nazareth	33	10	9	14	30	36	−6	39	
9	Ironi Nir Ramat HaSharon	33	9	12	12	31	42	−11	39	
10	Hapoel Bnei Lod	33	11	6	16	31	48	−17	39	
11	Hapoel Ashkelon	33	8	14	11	33	31	+2	38	Relegated to Liga Artzit
12	Hapoel Jerusalem	33	7	12	14	28	46	−18	32	Relegated to Liga Artzit

Source: rsssf.com
