= Hapoel Bat Yam F.C. =

Israeli football club

Hapoel Bat Yam
- Full name: Hapoel Bat Yam F.C. מועדון כדורגל הפועל בת ים
- Founded: 1951; 2012 (as Hapoel Abirei Bat Yam)
- Ground: Bat Yam Municipal Stadium
- Capacity: 3,100
- Chairman: Assaf Salem
- Manager: Yossi Hakim
- League: Liga Gimel Central
- 2015–16: 7th
Home colours	Away colours

Hapoel Bat Yam (Hebrew: הפועל בת ים) (currently known as Hapoel Abirei Bat Yam Hebrew: הפועל אבירי בת ים, lit. Hapoel Bat Yam Knights) is an Israeli football club from the city of Bat Yam. The current club is a resurrection of an older Hapoel Bat Yam club, which was folded in 2004.

== History ==
The club was first established in 1951 and played for several seasons in Liga Gimel before promoting to Liga Bet and achieving further promotion at the end of the 1968–69 season after winning the South A division. The club returned to the third tier after the formation of Liga Artzit at the end of the 1975–76 season. However, two seasons later the club finished third in South division of Liga Alef and promoted back to the second tier.

The club managed to survive only two seasons in Liga Artzit before relegating back to Liga Alef. In the 1981–82 season the club managed to finish as runner-up and qualified to the promotion play-offs, where they were beaten by Maccabi Shefa-'Amr and remained in Liga Alef. In 1986–87 the club topped their division and qualified to a promotion play-offs against the other divisional winner, Maccabi Hadera and the 11th and 12th ranked clubs from Liga Artzit, Hapoel Marmorek and Hapoel Ramat Gan. The club has won the play-offs and was promoted to Liga Artzit.

The club dropped back to Liga Alef at the end of the 1990–91 season after losing the Promotion-relegation play-offs against Hakoah Ramat Gan. The club bounced back to Liga Artzit two seasons later, and a season later won its first major trophy, the Toto Cup Artzit.

Upon creation of Ligat Ha'al, the club was placed in Liga Artzit, which became the third tier. The club suffered further relegations at the end of the 2002–03 season and the 2003–04 season, after which the club was folded.

In 2012, after 8 seasons out of existence, the club was re-established, taking the name Hapoel Abirei Bat Yam with Felix Halfon acting as club manager. The club finished its first season as joint winners, level on points with Hapoel Ramat Israel, but were not promoted initially after losing the deciding match to Hapoel Ramat Israel 0–1 (a.e.t.). However, the club got another chance at promotion and after a vacant spot has opened in Liga Bet and beat Hapoel Tzeirei Tayibe 1–0 to celebrate promotion. However, after a dreadful season in Liga Bet, the club finished bottom and dropped back to Liga Gimel.

== Honours ==
=== League ===
Honour	No.	Years
Third tier	1	1968–69, 1986–87
Fourth tier	1	1960–61

=== Cup competitions ===
Honour	No.	Years
Toto Cup (second tier)	2	1987–88, 1994–95

== Notable managers ==
- Gili Landau (born 1958)
