= Hapoel Haifa F.C. =

Israeli association football club

Hapoel Haifa
- Full name: Hapoel Haifa Football Club
- Nickname: The sharks
- Founded: 24 April 1924; 102 years ago
- Ground: Sammy Ofer Stadium, Haifa, Israel
- Capacity: 30,950
- Owner: Yoav Katz
- Manager: Haim Silvas
- League: Israeli Premier League
- 2025–26: Israeli Premier League, 10th of 14
- Website: www.hapoelhaifa.co.il
Home colours	Away colours	Third colours

The team crest for 2014–15 season

The team crest (1999–2011)

Hapoel Haifa Football Club (Hebrew: מועדון הכדורגל הפועל חיפה, Moadon HaKaduregel Hapoel Haifa) is an Israeli professional football club located in the city of Haifa. The club won one championship (1998–99) and 4 Israeli cups (1962–63, 1965–66 and 1973–74, 2017–18). The team is also known as "The Sharks". The club's home is the Sammy Ofer Stadium in Haifa, in which they have played since their departure from Kiryat Eliezer Stadium in 2014 and Kiryat Haim's Thomas D'Alesandro Stadium in 1955. The stadium, which is shared with rivals Maccabi Haifa, is the second largest in Israeli football, with a capacity of 30,950. The colours of the team's home kit are red throughout. The away colours are white shirts, and black shorts and socks.

== History ==
A chart showing the progress of Hapoel Haifa through the Israeli football league system, from 1931–32 to the present

=== The Early years ===
The beginning of the club was in a local organization in 1924 that was established in the Mutasarrifate of Jerusalem (present-day Israel). This organization included several branches related to sports, in addition to branches related to worker movements and the Histadrut. Their goal was to found the first ever labor football club in Palestine, like those around the world. The most acceptable version of the club's establishment says that the meeting took place during Passover, on 24 April 1924, at a house in Haifa, including 36 representatives of the different authorities. The meeting was led by Yehoshua Sherpstein and Yair Aharony.

On 1 May 1924, Labor Day, was the first match, in which Hapoel Haifa beat 3–1 the train workers of Haifa. In the first years of the club it played mainly friendly matches against different teams from Palestine, Europe, and the Middle East (Since the Football Association was yet to be established, there were no formal matches). At the beginning Hapoel Haifa was included under the Maccabi union, since it was the only union at that time. Two years later the club decided to leave Maccabi, and was among the founders of the new union, Hapoel.

In 1928 the Israel Football Association (IFA) was founded, and formal matches were scheduled: In the first 4 years only cup matches, and afterwards league matches were added. During these years Hapoel Haifa did not win many trophies, yet it was still one of the leading teams in the country. In 1932 the team qualified to its first cup final, against the British Police. The referee was British, and some of the decisions he made were very controversial. During the match, when the score was 1–0 to Hapoel Haifa (goal by Yonah Stern), after some decisions that the players of Haifa found very odd and unfair, one of Haifa players stole the cup. As a result, Hapoel Haifa was disqualified. That year 5 of Haifa's players made it to the Palestine squad.

=== The Fifties ===
In 1950, after the 1947–1949 Palestine war, the Israeli League returned to action, and Haifa finished in the 3rd place, after Maccabi and Hapoel Tel Aviv. Two years later the cup matches were renewed. These years were direct continuation to the seasons before the state of Israel was established, when the team was one of the leaders, yet did not manage to win any trophies.

=== The Sixties and The Seventies ===
Hapoel Haifa was very weak in the early sixties. The team finished 1962–63 one before last, and was supposed to relegate to the second division. But, due to suspicions about improper matches, the relegations were canceled (many say that this was due to the connections of the heads of Hapoel in the IFA). At this turning point, many talented young players promoted from the youth team, causing a significant improvement that started the club's best period. In the same season, 1962–63, the club won the Israel State Cup, after beating Maccabi Haifa in the final 1–0. In all of the following seasons the team finished in the top third of the league, and qualified to the cup final three more times. The main players of the team at that time were Abba Gindin, Yitzhak Englander, Yochanan Vollach and Roby Young. These players were some of the greatest players in Israeli football in the 1960s and the 1970s and were part of the Israel national team for many years. Roby Young was even the captain of the national team.

In 1974 Hapoel Haifa won the Israeli cup again. In those years the club's leading players began to leave it, including the shocking transfer of Englander and Vollach to the bitter rival Maccabi Haifa, due to Hapoel's poor management. Although the team finished 2nd in 1975, a great fall began, leading to the big crush of the 1980s.

=== The-eighties: The Downfall ===
In 1981 the team relegated, for the first time ever, to the second division. Until then it was one of the 3 clubs that never relegated (alongside Maccabi and Hapoel Tel Aviv). That was the beginning of the worst decade in the club's history. Even the signing of Peter Lorimer, one of the greatest players of Leeds United, as manager, didn't help and he left several months later. The big crisis in the Histadrut led to a financial crisis in the club, which was on the verge of bankruptcy. The crisis hit also the administrative side, and directors were replaced frequently. Near the end of the 1980s, three former players of the club, Yitzhak Englander, Avi Kaufman and Efraim Gabay, took the club to their hands as an exterior organization, hoping to save the club from bankruptcy, yet due to lack of funding sources they couldn't solve the financial crisis in the club.

=== The Nineties: The Age of Shapira ===
In 1992 the team promoted to the first division in the second time. That season was accompanied with rumors about an anonymous businessman who took responsibility on the club. Ultimately, the anonymous was turned out to be Robi Shapira, a businessman who made his fortune in the fishing business in Nigeria. Shapira gave big amounts of money to the club and saved it from financial collapse. That money was used to purchase many leading players, but the team made no remarkable achievement and was still at relegating danger. Following a long streak of losses during the season of 1993–94 Shapira decided to buy the club from the Histadrut. In the first years under Shapira many great players and managers were brought to the team, yet it could not win trophies and achieve the club's great ambition: championship.

=== 1998–99: The Championship ===
In 1997–98 Hapoel Haifa reached 3rd place, with Eli Guttman as manager. The following season the team was tagged as a top team, but not as a candidate for championship. In spite of the predictions, a streak of impressive victories put Haifa in the 1st place, with a big advantage over the rest of the league. Hapoel Haifa showed a very tactical and effective style of football that dragged criticism from different sources, such as the media and other teams. Hapoel Haifa remained in the 1st place and increased its advantage over other teams.

On Saturday, 8 May 1999, in the 27th round of the league, Hapoel Haifa competed with Maccabi Tel Aviv, who was 2nd before that round, in Kiryat Eliezer Stadium. Hapoel Haifa won the match 3–2 (two goals by Oren Zeituni and one more by Oren Nissim) and was crowned as champion, for the first (and only) time.

=== Millennium – Present: The Death of Shapira and Inconsistent Results ===
In the season following the championship, the team finished a disappointing 7th. Two key players left (Liron Basis to Maccabi Tel Aviv, Najwan Ghrayib to Aston Villa), and their replacements couldn't lead the team to repeat the great achievement. The next season, the manager Guttman left, and his replacement Guy Levy brought 4 new foreign players: Alin Minteuan, Oleg Yelshev, Michael Anicic and Viktor Paço, who joined veteran Dimitry Ulianov. The team finished in the 3rd place after two victories in the Haifa derby against Maccabi (3–0 and 3–1), and 3 victories over the current champion Hapoel Tel Aviv (3–1 and 1–0 in Tel Aviv and 2–0 at home).

In the summer of 2001, the media reported that Shapira had decided to reduce his investment in the club significantly. The club's budget was decreased, planned expenditures were canceled and key players were released. It was later discovered that Shapira's financial status had deteriorated. He had significant debts and his businesses were close to bankruptcy. Some of the club's assets, including player cards, were mortgaged to a Dutch fishing company which Shapira owed money to. On Friday, December 14, 2001, Shapira committed suicide in his house in Nigeria. After his suicide, the court in Haifa ruled that Hapoel Haifa would be administered by a temporary liquidators. At the end of that season (2001–02), Hapoel Haifa was relegated to the second division. For nearly 3 years the club was managed by 3 liquidators, who managed to keep the team in the second division and simultaneously looking for potential purchasers to the club.

Following its return to the top division in 2004, the club was bought by Yoav Katz, an Israeli businessman who resides in the United States. Hapoel Haifa played a single season (2004–05) in Israel's top league before again being relegated to the second division, where it stayed until the end of the 2008–09 season. After finishing first in the second division that year, Hapoel Haifa returned to the Israeli Premier league, and finished high enough in the standings to avoid relegation at the end of 2010. Nitzan Shirazi replaced Shlomi Dora as manager prior to the 2010–11 season. The club remains very well known and respected in the local league, though no silverware is added to the trophy cabinet. Many foreign players who choose to sign for the club are later on successful in the higher ranks and leagues, due to the club's good connections, and the club is up until current days a good place for players to grow and promote from.

In 2005–06 the club's youth team won the youth league's championship, and established dominance as one of the best teams in Israel's youth league.

== European Appearances ==
Hapoel Haifa was the first Israeli team to qualify to the third qualifying round of the UEFA Champions League (2000). The team passed Beşiktaş (Turkey) in the second qualifying round after 1–1 in Turkey (Đovani Roso scored to Haifa) and 0–0 in Kiryat Eliezer in the second leg. In the third qualifying round the team lost twice 2–0 to Valencia (Spain), who went on till the Champions League Final that year.

After losing to Valencia Hapoel Haifa met Club Brugge from Belgium in the UEFA Cup. Hapoel Haifa won that match 3–1 (two goals by Amir Turgeman and one by Nir Sevillia). In the second leg in Belgium Hapoel Haifa gained a quick advantage (Roso). Brugge managed to turn the score to 3–1; Amir Turgeman scored the 3–2 in the 75' minute and Brugge scored in stoppage time to win 4–2. Yet it was Haifa who qualified to the next level, due to advantage in away goals. It was the first time an Israeli team qualifies to the second round of the UEFA cup.

In the second round Haifa met Ajax from the Netherlands. In the first leg in Israel Ajax won 3–0. In the second leg Hapoel Haifa made a sensational victory of 1–0, with Đovani Roso scoring a penalty kick and missing another.

=== Matches ===
Season	Competition	Round	Opponent	Home	Away	Aggregate
1996	Intertoto Cup	Group Stage	(Belgium) Standard Liège	—N/a	2–2	4th
1996	Intertoto Cup	Group Stage	(Denmark) Aalborg	—N/a	4–5	4th
1996	Intertoto Cup	Group Stage	(Germany) VFB Stuttgart	0–4	—N/a	4th
1996	Intertoto Cup	Group Stage	(Northern Ireland) Cliftonville F.C.	1–1	—N/a	4th
1998	Intertoto Cup	R1	(Romania) Naţional București	1–2	1–3	2–5
1999–2000	Champions League	Q2	(Turkey) Besiktas	0–0	1–1	1–1 (a)
1999–2000	Champions League	Q3	(Spain) Valencia CF	0–2	0–2	0–4
1999–2000	UEFA Cup	R1	(Belgium) Club Brugge KV	3–1	2–4	5–5 (a)
1999–2000	UEFA Cup	R2	(Netherlands) Ajax FC	0–3	1–0	1–3
2001	Intertoto Cup	R1	(Estonia) TVMK Tallinn	2–0	3–0	5–0
2001	Intertoto Cup	R2	(Belarus) FC Dinamo Minsk	0–1	0–2	0–3
2018–19	Europa League	Q2	(Iceland) FH	1–1	1–0	2–1
2018–19	Europa League	Q3	(Italy) Atalanta	1–4	0–2	1–6

== Stadium ==
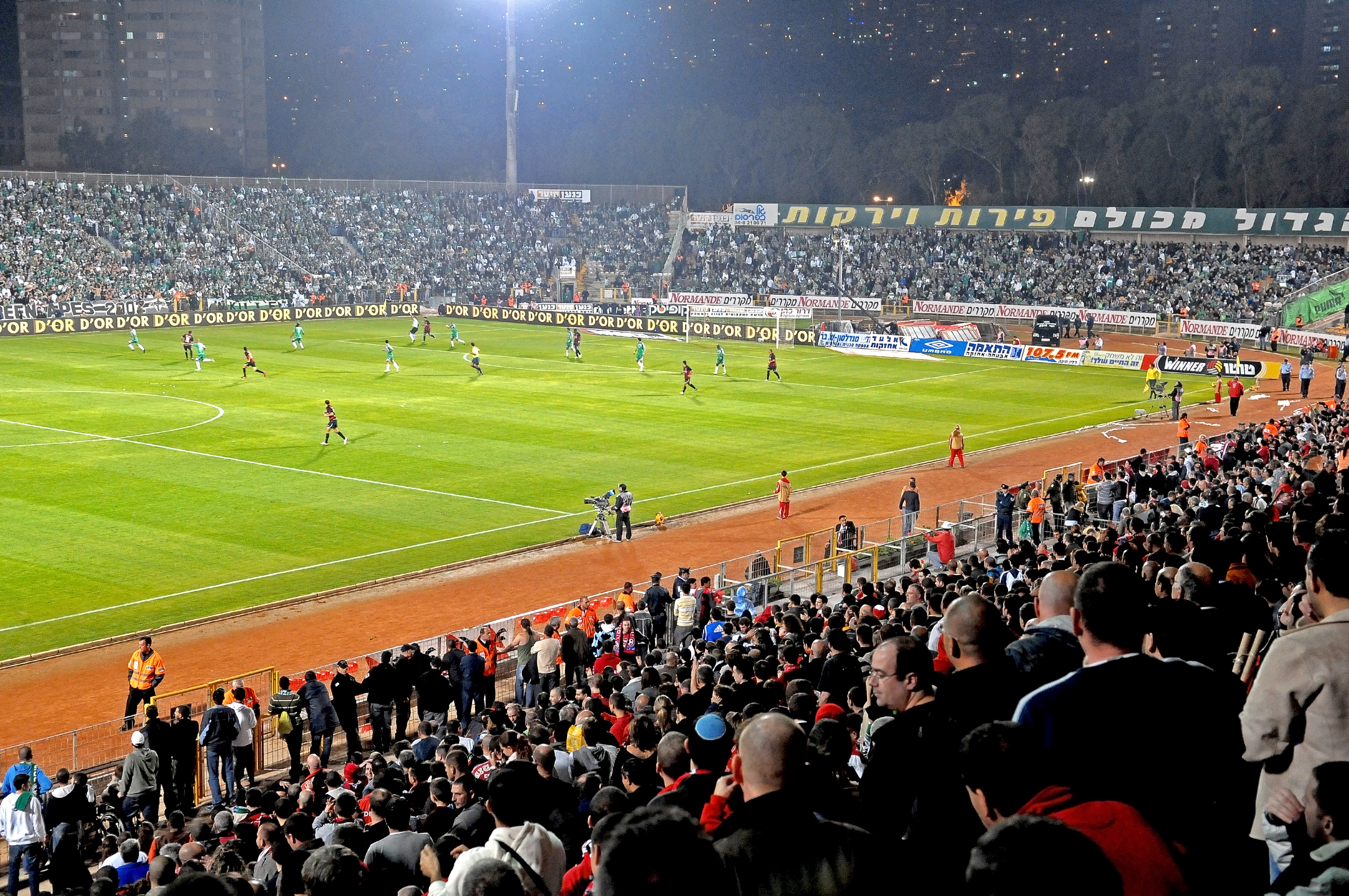
Kiryat Eliezer during derby match against Maccabi Haifa F.C.

Hapoel Haifa originally played in Kiryat Haim, which is the main training grounds of this club. In 1955, a gift from the Italian Labour Union was a football pitch in the heart of the city of Haifa, which would become the new home of Hapoel. The opening match was a Haifa derby, lost by Hapoel 4–1 over Maccabi.

=== New stadium ===
After the municipality of Haifa offered the club land for a stadium at the southern entrance to the city, Sammy Ofer Stadium was built, and now serves as Hapoel's home stadium, holding 30,950 seats.

== City Rivalry with Maccabi Haifa ==
The two main clubs in Haifa, Hapoel Haifa and Maccabi Haifa, has a long history of raging rivalry that includes mutually loathing and fan conflicts, a rivalry that went on even during Hapoel Haifa's less successful years in second division. The source of this rivalry is mainly in the clubs' political identity. Hapoel was founded as a socialist labor team, who were identified mainly with the Histadrut and the reign of Mapai, both local and national. Hapoel was identified as the team of the establishment that was supported by the authorities. Therefore, naturally, Maccabi Haifa became the deprived team, that had to fight for its existence. The differences between the clubs created the differences between the fans: Hapoel Haifa's fans were traditionally identified with the political left side of the map, most of the workers in the industries in Haifa. The Maccabi Haifa fans were identified mostly as part of the middle-class status.

In the last years the differences between the two sides faded, mainly because Maccabi's numerous achievements, which enlarged and varied their fan group. Yet there is still a slight difference between the two fan groups. Many of the fans of Hapoel are living in the Krayot. In the last years the rivalry got a more sportive shade, which appears especially before derby matches.

== In popular culture ==
The main characters in Eran Riklis's 1999 film Vulcan Junction are Hapoel Haifa's supporters and one of the characters is a club's player. The club management collaborated with the production and some of the scenes shot in the club's stadium in Kiryat Haim, some of the club's personnel even took part in the filming as extras. Hapoel Haifa supporter character also presented in the 2002 feature Broken Wings, directed by the club supporter, Nir Bergman. Literatural references of the club are available in the Hebrew books: Our Holocaust (by Amir Gutfreund, available in English), Go To Gaza (by Shay Lahav), Tashlich (by Nir Kipnis) and the football short stories anthology The Dutchman of Acre.

== Shirt Sponsors and manufacturers ==
Period	Kit Manufacturer	Shirt Sponsor
1976-77	Admiral	
1995	Adidas	שופ
1995–03	Diadora	Opel
2003–04	Diadora	קופיטק, Pointer Telocation
2004–05	Diadora	Pointer Telocation
2005–06	Diadora	אזורים
2006–07	Umbro	מחסני תאורה
2007–08	Umbro	הגדול מכולם
2008–09	Umbro	Easy Forex
2009–10	Umbro	4XP
2010–11	Derby Sport	Kumho Tires
2011–12	Diadora	Kumho Tires
2012–15	Diadora	התאמה
2015–16	Diadora	Good
2016–17	Diadora	Citrus
2017–18	Diadora	First Index
2018–19	Joma	Bogart
2019–21	Diadora	התאמה
2021-22	Diadora	אלמוג ציוד טכני
2022-23	Diadora (Home Kit) / Le Coq Sportif (Away kit)	Leos
2023-25	Diadora	Leos
2025-26	Reebok	פנורמה צפון
2026-?	Reebok	Ahuza

== Season to season ==
Season	Tier	Division	Place	State Cup
1949–50	1	Israeli League	3rd	Semi Final
1951–52	1	Liga Alef	3rd	Fourth Round
1953–54	1	Liga Alef	9th	Semi Final
1954–55	1	Liga Alef	9th	Quarter Final
1955–56	1	Liga Leumit	6th	N\A
1956–57	1	Liga Leumit	8th	Sixth Round
1957–58	1	Liga Leumit	7th	Final
1958–59	1	Liga Leumit	2nd	Quarter Final
1958–59	1	Liga Leumit	3rd	N\A
1960–61	1	Liga Leumit	3rd	Eighth Round
1961–62	1	Liga Leumit	8th	Fifth Round
1962–63	1	Liga Leumit	12th	Won
1963–64	1	Liga Leumit	6th	Final
1964–65	1	Liga Leumit	5th	Sixth Round
1965–66	1	Liga Leumit	7th	Won
1966–68	1	Liga Leumit	3rd	7th Round|5th Round
1968–69	1	Liga Leumit	4th	Semi Final
1969–70	1	Liga Leumit	10th	Quarter Final
1970–71	1	Liga Leumit	6th	Quarter Final
1971–72	1	Liga Leumit	6th	Quarter Final

Season	Tier	Division	Place	State Cup
1972–73	1	Liga Leumit	7th	Round of 16
1973–74	1	Liga Leumit	6th	Won
1974–75	1	Liga Leumit	3rd	Fourth Round
1975–76	1	Liga Leumit	3rd	Quarter Final
1976–77	1	Liga Leumit	9th	Sixth Round
1977–78	1	Liga Leumit	12th	Round of 16
1978–79	1	Liga Leumit	5th	Round of 16
1979–80	1	Liga Leumit	12th	Round of 16
1980–81	1	Liga Leumit	14th	Seventh Round
1981–82	2	Liga Artzit	6th	Seventh Round
1982–83	2	Liga Artzit	4th	Sixth Round
1983–84	2	Liga Artzit	1st	Quarter Final
1984–85	1	Liga Leumit	5th	Round of 16
1985–86	1	Liga Leumit	15th	Round of 16
1986–87	2	Liga Artzit	3rd	Seventh Round
1987–88	2	Liga Artzit	3rd	Round of 16
1988–89	2	Liga Artzit	7th	N\A
1989–90	2	Liga Artzit	9th	Seventh Round
1990–91	2	Liga Artzit	10th	N\A
1991–92	2	Liga Artzit	2nd	N\A

Season	Tier	Division	Place	State Cup
1992–93	1	Liga Leumit	7th	Eighth Round
1993–94	1	Liga Leumit	13th	Quarter Final
1994–95	1	Liga Leumit	13th	Final
1995–96	1	Liga Leumit	4th	Round of 16
1996–97	1	Liga Leumit	7th	Round of 16
1997–98	1	Liga Leumit	3rd	Round of 16
1998–99	1	Liga Leumit	1st	Quarter Final
1999–00	1	Ligat Ha'Al	7th	Quarter Final
2000–01	1	Ligat Ha'Al	3rd	Round of 16
2001–02	1	Ligat Ha'Al	11th	Eighth Round
2002–03	2	Liga Leumit	6th	Round of 16
2003–04	2	Liga Leumit	1st	Final
2004–05	1	Ligat Ha'Al	11th	Round of 16
2005–06	2	Liga Leumit	6th	9th Round
2006–07	2	Liga Leumit	3rd	Quarter Final
2007–08	2	Liga Leumit	3rd	9th Round
2008–09	2	Liga Leumit	1st	9th Round
2009–10	1	Ligat Ha'Al	12th	Eighth Round
2010–11	1	Ligat Ha'Al	10th	Quarter Final
2011–12	1	Ligat Ha'Al	12th	Eighth Round

Season	Tier	Division	Place	State Cup
2012–13	1	Ligat Ha'Al	9th	Round of 16
2013–14	1	Ligat Ha'Al	11th	Round of 16
2014–15	1	Ligat Ha'Al	12th	Eighth Round
2015–16	1	Ligat Ha'Al	12th	Round of 16
2016–17	1	Ligat Ha'Al	8th	Quarter Final
2017–18	1	Ligat Ha'Al	4th	Won
2018–19	1	Ligat Ha'Al	11th	Eighth Round
2019–20	1	Ligat Ha'Al	6th	Round of 16
2020–21	1	Ligat Ha'Al	9th	Round of 16
2021–22	1	Ligat Ha'Al	11th	Semi Final
2022–23	1	Ligat Ha'Al	7th	Round of 16
2023–24	1	Ligat Ha'Al	4th	Round of 16
2024–25	1	Ligat Ha'Al	5th	Round of 16
2025–26	1	Ligat Ha'Al	10th	Eighth Round

== Current squad ==
As of 27 August 2026

No.	Pos.	Nation	Player
1	GK	ISR	Yoav Gerafi
2	DF	ISR	Noam Cohen
3	DF	ISR	Tamir Arbel
4	DF	ISR	Dor Malul (Captain)
5	DF	SRB	Ivan Kričak
7	MF	ISR	Liran Rotman
8	MF	MLI	Cheikh Keita
9	FW	NGR	William Agada
10	MF	ISR	Shai Elias
11	MF	ISR	Sali Pahima
12	MF	ISR	Anis Porat Ayash
13	DF	CRO	Dario Župarić
14	FW	ISR	Waheb Habiballah
15	MF	ISR	Ya'ad Gonen

No.	Pos.	Nation	Player
17	FW	ISR	Alon Turgeman
18	FW	ISR	Itay Zafrani
19	FW	ISR	Sa'ar Elkayam
20	FW	ISR	Ahmed Hamam
21	MF	MLI	Cheickna Diakité
23	GK	ISR	Matan Ambar
25	DF	ISR	George Diba
30	FW	ISR	Idan Dadia
31	FW	ISR	Liam Nahum
39	MF	ISR	Yahali Va'aknin
42	MF	ISR	Tal Naim
55	MF	ISR	Naor Sabag
77	DF	SEN	Arial Mendy
92	FW	ISR	Hamed Mu'ataz

=== Out on loan ===
No.	Pos.	Nation	Player

=== Foreigners 2025–26 ===
Only up to 8 non-Israeli nationals can be in an Israeli club squad. Those with Jewish ancestry, married to an Israeli, or have played in Israel for an extended period of time, can claim a passport or permanent residency which would allow them to play with Israeli status.

- (Serbia) Ivan Kričak
- (Croatia) Dario Župarić
- (Mali) Cheikh Keita
- (Senegal) Arial Mendy
- (Nigeria) William Agada
- (Mali) Cheickna Diakité

== Titles ==
=== League ===
Title	No.	Years
Israeli Championships	1	1998–99

=== Cup competitions ===
Title	No.	Years
State Cup	4	1962–63, 1965–66, 1973–74, 2017–18
Toto Cup	2	2000–01, 2012–13
Israeli Super Cup	1	2018

== Coaching staff ==
Position	Name
Manager	(Israel) Haim Silvas
Assistant Manager	(Israel) Barak Badash
Goalkeeper Coach	(Israel) Ran Kadosh
Fitness Coach	(Israel) Danny Bibsebs
Analyst	(Israel) Shi Barcho
Masseur	(Israel) Jonathan Danino
Team Doctor	(Israel) Dr. Avi Wiseman
Graphic Designer	(Israel) Ami Ravid
Team Member	(Israel) Meli Lavi
Staff Member	(Israel) Dori Yamin

== Coaches ==
- (Israel) Mordechai Spiegler (1979–80)
- (Israel) Yehoshua Feigenbaum (1983–84)
- (Israel) Dror Kashtan (1 July 1994 – 30 June 1995)
- (Israel) Avram Grant (1 July 1995 – 30 June 1996)
- (Croatia) Ivan Katalinić (1996–97)
- (Israel) Eli Guttman (1997–00)
- (Israel) Guy Levy (2000–02)
- (Israel) Eli Guttman (2002)
- (Israel) Yehoshua Feigenbaum (2002–03)
- (Israel) Baruch Maman (2003–04)
- (Israel) Nir Levine (2004–05)
- (Israel) Ran Ben Shimon (2005–06)
- (Israel) Rafi Cohen (June 2006– Sept 06)
- (Israel) Shlomi Dora (28 January 2007–25 May 2010)
- (Israel) Nitzan Shirazi (5 June 2010–26 November 2011)
- (Israel) Tal Banin (27 November 2011–13 May 2012)
- (Israel) Nir Klinger (1 July 2012–30 June 2013)
- (Israel) Shlomi Dora (1 July 2013–14 May 2014)
- (Israel) Reuven Atar (1 July 2014–16 February 2015)
- (Israel) Tal Banin (16 February 2015–December 2015)
- (Israel) Meir Ben Margi (December 2015–15 February 2016)
- (Israel) Eli Cohen (15 February 2016–December 16)
- (Israel) Dani Golan (December 2016– March 2017)
- (Israel) Nir Klinger (March 2017–October 2018)
- (Israel) Sharon Mimer (November 2018–April 2019)
- (Israel) Haim Silvas (April 2019–April 2021)
- (Israel) Elisha Levi (April 2021–May 2022)
- (Israel) Nir Klinger (1 June 2022–23 October 2022)
- (Israel) Ronny Levy (25 October 2022 – June 2025)
- (Israel) Gal Arel (June 2025 - January 2026)
- (Israel) Haim Silvas (January 2026 - ?)
