= Maccabi Hadera F.C. =

Maccabi Hadera
- Full name: Maccabi Hadera Football Club מועדון כדורגל מכבי חדרה
- Founded: 1914
- Dissolved: 2004
- Ground: Maccabi Hadera Ground
- 2003–04: Liga Alef North, 1st
Home colours	Away colours

Maccabi Hadera Football Club (Hebrew: מועדון כדורגל מכבי חדרה) was an Israeli football club based at Hadera. The club was merged in 2006 with the rest of Hadera football club to form Ironi Sport Hadera F.C.

== History ==
The sports club was initially founded in 1914. During the British Mandate of Palestine the team played both friendly matches against local teams and army units' teams and matches in EIFA competitions. The team played in the 1929 Palestine Cup, falling in the first round to Maccabi Hasmonean Jerusalem in the first round. In 1937 the team reached the semi-final, a phase the team reached again only in 1986 when they became the first club to reach the semi-final of the Israel State Cup while playing in the third tier of Israeli football.

The team joined the 1946–47 Liga Bet, and finished the season 9th in the league. After the establishment of the state of Israel the club competed in the second and third tiers, achieving its best position in 1975–76. A season later the team was relegated to the third tier, and never returned to the second tier, although they came close after losing the promotion play-offs in 1982–83 and in 1986–87.

In the 2003–04 season, the club won Liga Alef North division (then the fourth tier) and were promoted to Liga Artzit. However, their budget was not approved by the IFA and as a result, demoted back to Liga Alef and eventually folded. However, in 2006, Maccabi Hadera joined forces with four other clubs, Hapoel Hadera, Hapoel Givat Olga, Hapoel Beit Eliezer and Hapoel Nahliel, as all the football clubs from Hadera merged into one club called Hapoel Ironi Eran Hadera.

== Honours ==
- Third tier (3):
  - 1955–56 Liga Bet North
  - 1973–74 Liga Bet North B
  - 1986–87 Liga Alef North
- Fourth tier (2):
  - 1998–99 Liga Bet North B
  - 2003–04 Liga Alef North
