= Beitar Avraham Be'er Sheva F.C. =

Israeli football club

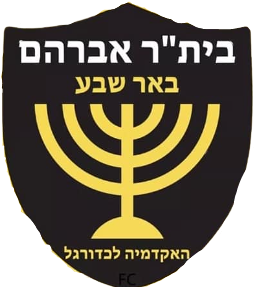
- Full name: Beitar Avraham Be'er Sheva Football Club
- Founded: 1956
- Dissolved: 2003
- Ground: Reisser Ground, Be'er Sheva
- 2002–03: Liga Leumit, 12th (relegated)
Home colours	Away colours

Beitar Avraham Be'er Sheva (Hebrew: בית"ר אברהם באר שבע) was an Israeli football club based in Be'er Sheva.

== History ==
The club was founded in 1956 and started in Liga Gimel. After three seasons at the bottom tier, the club won their regional division and were promoted to Liga Bet. In the 1965–66 season, they won Liga Bet South B division and were promoted to Liga Alef, then the second tier of Israeli football. The club were relegated back to Liga Bet in 1969–70 after finishing second from bottom of the South Division. Beitar were promoted back to Liga Alef, now the third tier, at the end of the 1978–79 season, remaining in Liga Alef until the 1986–87 season, when they were relegated back to Liga Bet.

In 1991 the club had returned to Liga Alef, and were promoted to Liga Artzit (then the second tier) in 1998. In their first season at the second level they finished fourth. In the 2000–01 season the club finished third, missing out on promotion to the Israeli Premier League by a single point (they had a better goal difference than runners-up Maccabi Kiryat Gat). Although they finished fourth the following season, Beitar finished bottom of Liga Leumit (which had become the second division in 1999) in 2002–03, without winning an away match all season, and were due to be relegated to Liga Artzit. However, the club folded in the summer, with Hapoel Marmorek promoted from Liga Alef to take their place.

The club's stadium was named after Michael Reisser, a Likud MK who died following a car accident in 1988.

== S.C. Be'er Sheva ==
S.C. Be'er Sheva
- Full name: Moadon Sport Be'er Sheva מועדון ספורט באר שבע
- Founded: 2006
- Ground: Reisser Ground, Be'er Sheva
- Chairman: Yigal Sarusi
- Manager: Ya'akov Turgeman
- League: Liga Bet South B
- 2023–24: Liga Bet South B, 3rd
Home colours	Away colours

In 2006, a successor club, F.C. Be'er Sheva (Hebrew: מועדון ספורט באר שבע), Moadon Sport Be'er Sheva, lit. Be'er Sheva Sport Club (or in short Hebrew: מ.ס. באר שבע Mem Samekh Be'er Sheva, lit. F.C. Be'er Sheva) was founded, after the Israel Football Association allowed it only three years after the original club folded because of financial collapse.

In their first season, F.C. Be'er Sheva finished runners-up in Liga Gimel Central-South division and were promoted to Liga Bet, where they play since in the South B division.

== Honours ==
=== League ===
Honour	No.	Years
Third tier	1	1965–66
Fourth tier	2	1958–59, 1978–79
