= Hapoel Tzafririm Holon F.C. =

Hapoel Tzafririm Holon
- Full name: Hapoel Tzafririm Holon Football Club
- Nickname(s): Huloniya
- Founded: 1985; 2017 (re-founded)
- Ground: HaLohamim Stadium, Holon
- Capacity: 3,000
- Chairman: Abraham Ezra
- Manager: Liran Haluba
- League: Liga Gimel Center
- 2015–16: 15th (Relegated)
Home colours	Away colours

Hapoel Tzafririm Holon F.C. (Hebrew: הפועל צפרירים חולון) is an Israeli football club based in the city of Holon. The club was founded in 1985 by a merger of Hapoel Holon and Tzafririm Holon.

== History ==
=== Hapoel Holon ===
Hapoel Holon were promoted to Liga Leumit, then the top division of Israeli football, in 1970. However, in the 1970–71 season the club finished bottom and was relegated back to Liga Alef. At the time of the merger with Tzafririm Holon, the club was in Liga Artzit, the second tier of Israeli football at the time.

=== Tzafririm Holon ===
Tzafririm (lit. Zephyrs) was established in 1971 in the Tel Giborim neighborhood of Holon. At the time of the merger with Hapoel Holon, the club was in Liga Alef, the third tier.

=== Hapoel Tzafririm Holon ===
Hapoel Tzafririm Holon succeeded Hapoel Holon's place in Liga Artzit, and finished its first season as a merged club, 1985–86, in the fourth place, one place short from promotion to the top division. In the following season, the club managed to win Liga Artzit and achieved promotion to the top division.

The club spent 11 seasons in the top division, in the late 1980s and in most of the 1990s. Although the club was relegated to the second tier on three occasions, they managed to make an immediate return to the top flight, at the end of the 1989–90, 1997–98 and 1999–2000 seasons. The club's best placing to date came at the 1992–93 season, when they finished sixth in Liga Leumit, the top division at the time.

The club's last season in the top division was 2000–01, when they finished bottom and were relegated to Liga Leumit, which became the new second tier of Israeli football. In 2001–02 and again in 2003–04, the club finished second bottom in Liga Leumit; However, in both occasions, they were spared from relegation to Liga Artzit (the third tier at the time), after Hakoah Ramat Gan and Maccabi Kiryat Gat were demoted respectively, for violating the budget rules.

In 2004–05, the club finished bottom of Liga Leumit and relegated to Liga Artzit. In the following season, the club suffered subsequent relegation, to Liga Alef. The slump continued in the 2007–08 season, after the club lost 1–4 to Hapoel Arad in the Relegation play-offs and dropped further to the fifth tier at the time, Liga Bet.

At the end of the 2008–09 season, Tzafririm won Liga Bet South B division and returned to Liga Alef. Due to the restructuring of the Israeli football pyramid, Tzafririm jumped by two levels, to the third tier of Israeli football for the 2009–10 season.

After being badly defeated in the final match of the 2010–11 season, the club was relegated to Liga Bet, currently the fourth tier of Israeli football. Israeli football has the following structure in descending order: Premier, Leumit, Alef, Bet, Gimel.

On 6 July 2016 Tzafririm merged with F.C. Holon Yaniv to Hapoel Holon and signed to Liga Bet.

Even the club promoted to Liga Alef, In summer 2017 Tzafririm re-founded at Liga Gimel.

== Honours ==
=== League ===
Honour	No.	Years
Second tier	3	1986–87, 1989–90, 1999–2000
Fourth tier	2	1973–74^{1}, 1981–82^{1}
Fifth tier	1	2008–09

^{1}Achieved by Tzafririm Holon F.C.

=== Cups ===
Honour	No.	Years
Liga Bet South B Division Cup	1	2011–12

== Notable former managers ==
- Nir Levine (born 1962)
