= Hakoah Amidar Ramat Gan F.C. =

Israeli football club

Hakoah Maccabi Amidar Ramat Gan
- Full name: Hakoah Amidar Ramat Gan Football Club מועדון כדורגל הכח עמידר רמת גן
- Founded: 1959; 66 years ago
- Ground: Winter Stadium, Ramat Gan
- Capacity: 8,000
- Owner: Nimrod Vered
- Chairman: Israel Sapir
- Manager: Idan Litbek
- League: Liga Bet South A
- 2024–25: Liga Bet South A, 5th
| Home colours | Away colours |

Hakoah Maccabi Amidar Ramat Gan Football Club (Hebrew: מועדון כדורגל הכח מכבי עמידר רמת גן) is an Israeli football club based in Ramat Gan. The club is currently in Liga Alef South division and plays at the Winter Stadium in Ramat Shikma, a neighbourhood of Ramat Gan.

== History ==
The club was established in 1959 by a merger of Hakoah Tel Aviv and Maccabi Ramat Gan. The new club was based at Maccabi's Gali Gil stadium in Ramat Gan, but largely consisted of Hakoah players.

In 1962, the club was promoted to Liga Leumit, then the top division. In their first season they finished third from bottom. In 1964–65 the club won its first championship, beating Hapoel Petah Tikva to the title on goal difference. In 1969, the club won its first State Cup, beating Maccabi Sha'arayim 1–0 in the final. Two seasons later they won the cup again, this time defeating Maccabi Haifa 2–1.

In 1972–73, the club won their second title, but missed out on the double when they lost the cup final 2–0 to Hapoel Jerusalem. However, the following season they finished second from bottom and only avoided relegation after winning the promotion/relegation play-offs. In 1974–75 they finished in the relegation zone again, but were reprieved after the Israel Football Association decided to expand the league from 16 to 18 clubs.

At the end of the 1977–78 season Hakoah were relegated. They won Liga Artzit at the first attempt and made an immediate return to the top flight. However, they were relegated at the end of their first season back in the top division. The following year they finished fourth in Liga Artzit, a place below the promotion places.

In 1982–83 the club finished second in Liga Artzit and returned to the top division again. However, they finished bottom of the league in 1984–85 and were relegated for the third time in less than a decade. In 1987–88, the club had dropped into Liga Alef, the third tier, though they returned to the second division at the end of the 1990–91 season. In 1994, the club was involved in a match fixing scandal, and were punished by a points deduction, a fine and a ban on foreign players. They won the second division's Toto Cup in 1996, 1997 and 1999.

At the end of the 2001–02 season the club finished 7th in Liga Leumit (now the second tier), but were demoted by the IFA due to financial problems. In September 2002 the club almost folded, with the money needed to survive only becoming available during the last hour, partly from supporters. Despite their problems, they won first season at the first attempt to immediately bounce back to Liga Leumit.

In 2005 Liga Artzit club Maccabi Ramat Amidar merged into Hakoah, with the club's name changed to Hakoah Maccabi Amidar Ramat Gan, though the "Maccabi" part has since been dropped, and yellow (Maccabi Ramat Amidar's colours) was added to the kit. At the end of their first season in their new guise, the club finished second in the league, winning promotion to the Premier League, the first time they had played in the top division since 1985. Although they finished second from bottom the following season, Hakoah won Liga Leumit in 2007–08 to make an immediate return to the Premier League.

In 2008–09, the club was relegated to Liga Leumit.

In 2014–15, the club was relegated to Liga Alef.

== Colours ==
Despite the proximity, there were good ties between the clubs of Hakoah Vienna and Austria Vienna. When Hakoah Tel Aviv was founded, all kinds of equipment were required. Austria Vienna supplied their own shirts which were violet, which has remained the colour of the club. After the merger with Maccabi Ramat Amidar, the club incorporated yellow into their kits.

== Current squad ==
As of 22 July 2025

| No. | Pos. | Nation | Player |
|---|---|---|---|
| — | GK | ISR | Ben Wolowski |
| — | DF | ISR | Ben Elul |
| — | DF | ISR | Ofir Grosman |
| — | DF | ISR | Evgeniy Vinokoron |
| — | DF | ISR | Gal Porat |
| — | MF | ISR | Steni Asefa |
| — | MF | ISR | Yanai Elbaz |
| — | MF | ISR | Hay David |

| No. | Pos. | Nation | Player |
|---|---|---|---|
| — | MF | ISR | Tal Mishan |
| — | MF | ISR | Amit Mor |
| — | MF | ISR | Shay Motai |
| — | FW | ISR | Dor Moskovich |
| — | MF | ISR | Natan Shamsiev |
| — | FW | ISR | Tal Lev |
| — | FW | ISR | Pini Matana |
| — | FW | ISR | Eli Elbaz |

== Honours ==
=== League ===
| Honour | No. | Years |
|---|---|---|
| Israeli Championships | 2 | 1964–65^{1}, 1972–73^{1} |
| Second tier | 2 | 1978–79^{1}, 2007–08 |
| Third tier | 1 | 2002–03^{1} |

=== Cup competitions ===
| Honour | No. | Years |
|---|---|---|
| State Cup | 2 | 1968–69^{1}, 1970–71^{1} |
| Toto Cup (second division) | 3 | 1995–96^{1}, 1996–97^{1}, 1998–99^{1} |

^{1}Achieved by Hakoah Maccabi Ramat Gan
Achievements by Maccabi Ramat Gan, Maccabi Ramat Amidar and Hakoah Tel Aviv are listed in the clubs' individual articles

== Notable former coaches ==
- Rafi Cohen (born 1965)
- Gili Landau (born 1958)
- Vicky Peretz (1953–2021)
