= Liga Leumit =

2nd division of the Israeli association football (soccer) leagues

Liga Leumit ליגה לאומית
- Founded: 1955; 71 years ago (as 1st tier); 1999; 27 years ago (as 2nd tier)
- Country: Israel
- Confederation: UEFA (Europe)
- Number of clubs: 16
- Level on pyramid: 2 (1999–present); 1 (1955–1999)
- Promotion to: Premier League
- Relegation to: Liga Alef
- Domestic cup(s): State Cup; Toto Cup (Leumit)
- Current champions: Maccabi Petah Tikva (6th title) (2025–26)
- Broadcaster: Sport 5
- Website: www.football.co.il/article/category/nfl/
- Current: 2026–27 Liga Leumit

The Israeli Liga Leumit (Hebrew: הליגה הלאומית, HaLiga HaLeumit, lit. 'National League') is the second division of the professional Israeli association football (soccer) league system. This second-tier league is placed directly below the Israeli Premier League.

== Structure ==
There are 16 clubs in the league. At the end of each season, the two lowest-placed teams are relegated to Liga Alef while the two highest-placed teams from Liga Alef are promoted in their place. The two highest-placed Liga Leumit teams are promoted to the Israeli Premier League while the bottom two teams from Israeli Premier League are relegated in their place.

The participating clubs were first play a conventional round-robin schedule for a total of 30 matches, with all points accumulated by the clubs are halved.

Following this, the top eight teams will first play in a promotion playoff. To determine the promoted teams. and the eight clubs play a single round-robin schedule.

The Israeli State Cup winners qualify for the third qualifying round of the 2013–14 UEFA Europa League.

In addition, the bottom eight teams play out to avoid two relegation spots.

== Broadcast rights ==
=== Television ===
Since the 2010–11 season, one match is broadcast live on Sport +5 LIVE channel on Friday or Saturday afternoons.

== History ==
Liga Leumit came into existence at the start of the 1955–56 season, replacing Liga Alef as the top division in Israeli football. However, it was usurped as the top flight in the 1999–2000 season, when it was replaced by the Premier League. Since then it has operated as the second tier in the Israeli football league system.

=== Current Liga Leumit clubs ===
The following clubs are participating in the 2026–27 season:

- Bnei Yehuda Tel Aviv
- F.C. Ashdod
- F.C. Kafr Qasim
- F.C. Kiryat Yam
- Hapoel Acre
- Hapoel Afula
- Hapoel Kfar Saba
- Hapoel Kfar Shalem
- Hapoel Ra'anana
- Hapoel Rishon LeZion
- Ironi Modi'in
- Maccabi Akhi Nazareth
- Maccabi Bnei Reineh
- Maccabi Herzliya
- Maccabi Ironi Kiryat Gat
- Maccabi Jaffa

== Past seasons champions ==
Season	Promoted to First Division	Relegated from First Division	Promoted from Third Division	Relegated to Third Division
1999–2000	**Tzafririm Holon**	Maccabi Herzliya; Hapoel Kfar Saba; Hapoel Jerusalem	Hapoel Ramat Gan Givatayim	Hapoel Ashkelon
2000–2001	**Hapoel Be'er Sheva**; Maccabi Kiryat Gat	Tzafririm Holon; Bnei Yehuda	Maccabi Kafr Kanna; Hapoel Ra'anana	Hapoel Jerusalem; Maccabi Ironi Kiryat Ata
2001–2002	**Hapoel Kfar Saba**; Bnei Yehuda	Maccabi Kiryat Gat; Hapoel Haifa	Hapoel Nazareth Illit; Hapoel Jerusalem	Hakoah Ramat Gan; Hapoel Beit She'an
2002–2003	**Maccabi Ahi Nazareth**; Bnei Sakhnin	Hapoel Kfar Saba; Ironi Rishon LeZion	Ironi Kiryat Shmona; Hakoakh Amidar Ramat Gan	Beitar Be'er Sheva; Maccabi Kafr Kanna
2003–2004	**Hapoel Haifa**; Hapoel Nazareth Illit	Maccabi Netanya; Maccabi Ahi Nazareth	Hapoel Acre; Ironi Ramat HaSharon	Hapoel Ramat Gan; Maccabi Kiryat Gat
2004–2005	**Hapoel Kfar Saba**; Maccabi Netanya	Hapoel Be'er Sheva; Hapoel Haifa	Hapoel Ashkelon; Maccabi Be'er Sheva	Maccabi Ahi Nazareth; Tzafririm Holon
2005–2006	**Maccabi Herzliya**; Hakoakh Amidar Ramat Gan	Bnei Sakhnin; Hapoel Nazareth Illit	Maccabi Ahi Nazareth; Hapoel Bnei Lod	Ironi Rishon LeZion; Maccabi Be'er Sheva
2006–2007	**Ironi Kiryat Shmona**; Bnei Sakhnin	Hapoel Petah Tikva; Hakoakh Amidar Ramat Gan	Hapoel Rishon LeZion; Hapoel Ramat Gan	Hapoel Ashkelon; Hapoel Jerusalem
2007–2008	**Hakoah Amidar Ramat Gan**; Hapoel Petah Tikva	Maccabi Herzliya; Hapoel Kfar Saba	Hapoel Jerusalem; Maccabi Ironi Kiryat Ata	Ironi Rishon LeZion; Hapoel Nazareth Illit
2008–2009	**Hapoel Haifa**; Hapoel Acre; Hapoel Be'er Sheva; Hapoel Ramat Gan; Hapoel Ra'anana; Maccabi Ahi Nazareth	Ironi Kiryat Shmona; Hakoakh Amidar Ramat Gan	Sektzia Nes Tziona; Hapoel Ashkelon; Ironi Rishon LeZion; Hapoel Marmorek; Beitar Shimshon Tel Aviv; Maccabi Ironi Bat Yam; Hapoel Nazareth Illit; Ahva Arraba; Maccabi Be'er Sheva	Maccabi Ironi Kiryat Ata
2009–2010	**Ironi Kiryat Shmona**; Hapoel Ashkelon	Hapoel Ra'anana; Maccabi Ahi Nazareth	Hapoel Herzliya; Maccabi Ironi Jatt Al-Ahli	Hapoel Jerusalem; Hapoel Marmorek
2010–2011	**Ironi Ramat HaSharon**; Hapoel Rishon LeZion	Hapoel Ashkelon; Hapoel Ramat Gan Givatayim	Hapoel Jerusalem; Maccabi Umm al-Fahm	Maccabi Ironi Jatt Al-Ahli; Ahva Arraba
2011–2012	**Hapoel Ramat Gan**	Ironi Rishon LeZion; Maccabi Petah Tikva; Hapoel Petah Tikva	Maccabi Yavne	Ironi Bat Yam; Hapoel Herzliya; Maccabi Be'er Sheva
2012–2013	**Maccabi Petah Tikva**; Hapoel Ra'anana	Hapoel Ramat Gan Givatayim; Maccabi Netanya	Hapoel Afula; Hapoel Jerusalem	Sektzia Nes Tziona; Hapoel Kfar Saba
2013–2014	**Maccabi Netanya**; Hapoel Petah Tikva	Ironi Ramat HaSharon; Bnei Yehuda	Hapoel Kfar Saba; Ironi Kiryat Gat; Ironi Tiberias	Hapoel Jerusalem; Hapoel Ashkelon; Maccabi Umm al-Fahm
2014–2015	**Bnei Yehuda**; Hapoel Kfar Saba	F.C. Ashdod; Hapoel Petah Tikva	Hapoel Jerusalem; Hapoel Ashkelon	Ironi Tiberias; Hakoah Amidar Ramat Gan
2015–2016	**F.C. Ashdod**; Hapoel Ashkelon	Maccabi Netanya; Hapoel Acre	Ironi Nesher; Maccabi Sha'arayim	Maccabi Yavne; Maccabi Kiryat Gat
2016–2017	**Maccabi Netanya**; Hapoel Acre	Hapoel Tel Aviv; Hapoel Kfar Saba	Hapoel Hadera; Hapoel Marmorek	Maccabi Sha'arayim; Hapoel Jerusalem
2017–2018	**Hapoel Tel Aviv**; Hapoel Hadera	Hapoel Ashkelon; Hapoel Acre	Hapoel Iksal; Sektzia Nes Tziona	Maccabi Herzliya; Ironi Nesher
2018–2019	**Hapoel Kfar Saba**; Sektzia Nes Tziona	Bnei Sakhnin; Maccabi Petah Tikva	Hapoel Umm al-Fahm; F.C. Kafr Qasim	Hapoel Iksal; Hapoel Marmorek
2019–2020	**Maccabi Petah Tikva**; Bnei Sakhnin	Sektzia Nes Tziona; Hapoel Ra'anana	Hapoel Kfar Shalem; Hapoel Iksal	Hapoel Ashkelon; Hapoel Bnei Lod
2020–2021	**Hapoel Nof HaGalil**; Hapoel Jerusalem	Bnei Yehuda Tel Aviv; Hapoel Kfar Saba	Hapoel Ashdod; Maccabi Bnei Reineh	Hapoel Iksal; Hapoel Kfar Shalem
2021–2022	**Maccabi Bnei Reineh**; Sektzia Nes Tziona	Hapoel Nof HaGalil; Maccabi Petah Tikva	Ironi Tiberias; Maccabi Jaffa	Beitar Tel Aviv Bat Yam; Hapoel Ra'anana
2022–2023	**Maccabi Petah Tikva**; Hapoel Petah Tikva	Sektzia Nes Tziona; Ironi Kiryat Shmona	Maccabi Herzliya; Ihud Bnei Shefa-'Amr	Hapoel Ashdod; Maccabi Ahi Nazareth
2023–2024	**Ironi Kiryat Shmona**; Ironi Tiberias	Hapoel Petah Tikva; Hapoel Tel Aviv	Hapoel Kfar Shalem; Hapoel Ra'anana	Ihud Bnei Shefa-'Amr; Sektzia Nes Tziona
2024–2025	**Hapoel Tel Aviv**; Hapoel Petah Tikva	Maccabi Petah Tikva; Hapoel Hadera	Ironi Modi'in; F.C. Kiryat Yam	Ironi Ramat HaSharon; Hapoel Umm al-Fahm
2025–2026	**Maccabi Petah Tikva**; Hapoel Ramat Gan Givatayim	F.C. Ashdod; Maccabi Bnei Reineh	Maccabi Kiryat Gat; Maccabi Ahi Nazareth	Hapoel Hadera; Hapoel Nof HaGalil

- **In bold** team that won the Championship

== Record of finishing positions of clubs in the Liga Leumit ==
Table correct as at the end of the 2023–24 Israeli Liga Leumit season.

Club	Best result	S	99–00	00–01	01–02	02–03	03–04	04–05	05–06	06–07	07–08	08–09	09–10	10–11	11–12	12–13	13–14	14–15	15–16	16–17	17–18	18–19	19–20	20–21	21–22	22–23	23–24	24–25	25–26	26–27
Maccabi Ahi Nazareth	1st (x1)	22	9	10	8	1		11		8	9	6		9	4	10	4	7	7	8	6	11	13	11	9	15				
Hapoel Rishon LeZion	2nd (x1)	21					10	6	11		11		8	2		6	11	10	12	10	3	12	5	4	14	12	13	8	8	
Maccabi Herzliya	1st (x1)	20		9	3	5	9	7	1			7	10	4	3	7	10	13	5	13	15						7	5	3	
Hapoel Ramat Gan	1st (x1)	20		4	10	7	12				6	4			1		5	6	3	4	13	8	3	6	12	9	11	3	2	
Hapoel Nir Ramat HaSharon	1st (x1)	18						10	10	9	8	11	5	1				11	10	9	11	13	8	7	13	11	6	11		
Hapoel Nof HaGalil	1st (x1)	20				4	2			7	12		7	11	12	3	8	14	13	14	7	3	11	1		14	4	14	15	
Hapoel Jerusalem	2nd (x1)	15		12		3	6	4	5	12		10	15		6	4	12	9	14	15				2						
Hapoel Bnei Lod	2nd (x1)	14								10	5	9	13	8	2	8	3	3	8	7	10	9	15							
Hapoel Kfar Saba	1st (x3)	18		8	1		4	1				8	3	3	7	16		2			14	1			6	7	14	7	7	
Hapoel Ra'anana	2nd (x1)	16			9	8	5	9	9	6	7	5		5	5	2								10	15			12	10	
Hakoah Amidar Ramat Gan	1st (x1)	13	6	5	7		8	5	2		1		11	14	13	11	13	16												
Beitar Tel Aviv	3rd (x1)	13											12	10	8	14	7	12	9	3	4	7	7	5	16					
Hapoel Petah Tikva	2nd (x3)	12									2					5	2		6	6	9	10	10	15	5	2		2		
Hapoel Ironi Acre	2nd (x2)	15						3	7	5	10	2								2		14	12	13	11	5	9	9	14	
Hapoel Ashkelon	2nd (x2)	10	10						8	11			2		9	13	15		2			6	16							
Hapoel Afula	4th (x1)	14															6	4	11	11	8	5	14	9	10	10	12	15	11	
Sektzia Nes Tziona	2nd (x2)	8											4	6	11	15						2		3	2		15			
Maccabi Kiryat Gat	2nd (x2)	7	2	2		10	7											5	16											
Bnei Sakhnin	2nd (x3)	6	4	7	6	2				2													2							
Hapoel Be'er Sheva	1st (x1)	6	7	1					4	4	4	3																		
Hapoel Haifa	1st (x2)	6				6	1		6	3	3	1																		
Hapoel Katamon Jerusalem	4th (x3)	6															14		4	5	5	4	4							
Hapoel Tzafririm Holon	1st (x1)	5	1		11	9	11	12																						
Ironi Kiryat Shmona	1st (x3)	6					3	8	3	1			1														1			
Beitar Be'er Sheva	3rd (x1)	4	5	3	4	12																								
Maccabi Be'er Sheva	12th (x1)	4							12				14	12	15															
Maccabi Yavne	8th (x1)	4														9	9	8	15											
Bnei Yehuda	1st (x1)	8			2													1							8	8	3	6	4	
Maccabi Netanya	1st (x2)	3						2									1			1										
Hapoel Beit She'an	6th (x1)	3	8	6	12																									
Maccabi Ironi Bat Yam	6th (x1)	3											6	13	14															
F.C. Kafr Qasim	3rd (x1)	8																					6	12	3	13	10	10	12	
Hapoel Umm al-Fahm	4th (x1)	6																					9	14	7	4	8	16		
Hapoel Marmorek	12th (x1)	3											16								12	15								
Maccabi Umm al-Fahm	10th (x1)	3													10	12	16													
Maccabi Petah Tikva	1st (x4)	4														1							1			1			1	
Maccabi Ironi Kiryat Ata	11th (x1)	2		11								12																		
Maccabi Kafr Kanna	5th (x1)	2			5	11																								
Ahva Arraba	9th (x1)	2											9	16																
Hapoel Herzliya	7th (x1)	2												7	16															
Ironi Nesher	12th (x1)	2																		12	16									
Hapoel Iksal	8th (x1)	2																				16		8						
Maccabi Acre	3rd (x1)	1	3																											
Hapoel Tel Aviv	1st (x2)	2																			1							1		
F.C Ashdod	1st (x1)	2																	1											
Hapoel Hadera	2nd (x1)	2																			2								16	
Maccabi Ironi Jatt Al-Ahli	15th (x1)	1												15																
Ironi Tiberias	2nd (x1)	3																15								3	2			
Maccabi Sha'arayim	16th (x1)	1																		16										
Hapoel Kfar Shalem	4th (x1)	4																						16				4	5	
Maccabi Bnei Reineh	1st (x1)	2																							1					
Hapoel Ashdod	4th (x1)	2																							4	16				
Maccabi Kabilio Jaffa	5th (x1)	5																								6	5	13	9	
Ihud Bnei Shef-'Amr	16th (x1)	1																									16			
Ironi Modi'in	13th (x1)	2																											13	
F.C. Kiryat Yam	6th (x1)	2																											6	
