= List of 2009–10 Israeli football transfers =

The following is a list of transfers involving Israeli football clubs during the 2009 Summer break. For Winter 2009–10 transfers, see List of 2009–10 Israeli football winter transfers.

== Bnei Yehuda ==
=== In ===
- (Israel) Aviv Haddad - from (Israel) Hakoah Amidar Ramat Gan
- (Israel) Ran Kadoch - from (England) Barnet F.C.
- (Israel) Omri Afek - from (Israel) Maccabi Haifa
- (Israel) George Amsis - from (Israel) Gadna Tel Aviv Yehuda
- (Croatia) Siniša Linić - from (Croatia) Hajduk Split

=== Out ===
- (Serbia) Milan Martinović - free agent
- (Israel) Kobi Moyal - to (Israel) Beitar Jerusalem
- (Israel) Shai Nissim - to (Israel) Beitar Jerusalem
- (Croatia) Hrvoje Kovačević - to (Israel) Hapoel Ramat Gan
- (Israel) Eli Abarbanel - to (Israel) Hapoel Petah Tikva
- (Israel) Tomer Hemed - to (Israel) Maccabi Ahi Nazareth
- (Israel) Aviran Dalal - to (Israel) Hapoel Bnei Lod
- (Israel) Tamir Cahlon - to (Israel) Maccabi Tel Aviv

== Bnei Sakhnin ==
=== In ===
- (Brazil) Cadu - From (United Arab Emirates) Hatta Club
- (Romania) Bogdan Apostu - From (Hungary) Nyíregyháza Spartacus
- (Israel) Amir Abu Arar - from (Israel) Hakoah Amidar Ramat Gan
- (Israel) Reuven Oved - free agent

=== Out ===
- (Israel) Yehiel Tzagai - free agent
- (Israel) Oshri Gita - to (Israel) Hapoel Acre
- (Ghana) Okocha - to (Israel) Maccabi Netanya
- (Israel) Yaniv Luzon - to (Israel) Maccabi Ahi Nazareth

== Beitar Jerusalem ==
=== In ===
- (Israel) Kobi Moyal - return from loan from (Israel) Bnei Yehuda
- (Peru) Junior Viza - return from loan from (Israel) Hapoel Petah Tikva
- (Israel) Avi Reikan - return from loan from (Israel) Hapoel Petah Tikva
- (Israel) Hen Azriel - return from loan from (Israel) Hapoel Petah Tikva
- (Cameroon) Joslain Mayebi - from (Israel) Hakoah Amidar Ramat Gan
- (Brazil) David Gomez - from (Israel) Hapoel Jerusalem F.C.

=== Out ===
- (Argentina) Dario Fernandez - to (Greece) Aris Thessaloniki F.C.
- (Croatia) Tvrtko Kale - to (Israel) Hapoel Be'er Sheva
- (Israel) Michael Zandberg - to (Israel) Hapoel Tel Aviv
- (Israel) Nir Nachum - to (Israel) F.C. Ashdod
- (Israel) David Amsalem - retired

== F.C. Ashdod ==
=== In ===
- (Israel) Ori Uzan - from (Israel) Hapoel Petah Tikva
- (Israel) Barak Badash - from (Israel) Hakoah Amidar Ramat Gan
- (Israel) Nir Nachum - from (Israel) Beitar Jerusalem
- (Israel) Idan Wiezman - from (Israel) Hakoah Amidar Ramat Gan
- Israel Rosh - from Hakoah Amidar Ramat Gan
- (Israel) Gal Levy - from (Israel) Hakoah Amidar Ramat Gan
- (Israel) Shay Revivo - from (Israel) Hapoel Ramat Gan

=== Out ===
- (Israel) Shay Holtzman - retired
- (Israel) Kobi Dajani - to (Israel) Hapoel Petah Tikva
- (Israel) Amir Lavi - to (Israel) Hapoel Ra'anana
- (Israel) Rahamim Tzukul - free agent
- (Israel) Shai Maimon - loan return to (Israel) Maccabi Haifa
- (Czech Republic) Lubomír Kubica - (Azerbaijan) Inter Baku
- (Israel) David Revivo - from (Israel) Hapoel Be'er Sheva
- (Israel) Yossi Ofir - from (Israel) Hapoel Be'er Sheva

== Hapoel Acre ==
=== In ===
- (Cameroon) Emmanuel Emangoa - from (Israel) Maccabi Kiryat Ata
- (Israel) Eitan Azaria - from (Israel) Maccabi Herzliya
- (Israel) Gad Amos - from (Israel) Maccabi Haifa
- (Israel) Itzhak Cohen - from (Israel) Hapoel Petah Tikva
- (Israel) Oshri Gita - from (Israel) Bnei Sakhnin
- Israel Zviti - from Ironi Nir Ramat HaSharon
- (Israel) Sharon Goramzano - from (Israel) Hapoel Ra'anana

=== Out ===
- (United States) Bryan Gerzicich - to (Israel) Hapoel Haifa
- (Israel) Alon Ziv - to (Israel) Ahva Arraba
- (Israel) Rafi Sarusi - free agent
- (Israel) Shlomi Edri - free agent
- (Nigeria) Omar Abdul Aziz - free agent
- (Israel) Ronen Schwartzman - to (Israel) Ahva Arraba
- (Israel) Tomer Tayar - free agent

== Hapoel Be'er Sheva ==
=== In ===
- (Croatia) Tvrtko Kale - from (Israel) Beitar Jerusalem
- (Israel) Erez Mesika - from (Cyprus) AEK Larnaca
- (Israel) Eyal Shen - from (Israel) Hapoel Petah Tikva
- (Brazil) Danilo - from (China) Wuhan Guanggu
- (Israel) Shimon Harush - from (Israel) Maccabi Ahi Nazareth
- (Guinea) Pathé Bangoura - from (Azerbaijan) Olimpik Baku
- (Ghana) Joseph Tachie - from (Ghana) Accra Hearts of Oak SC
- (Israel) Siraj Nasser - from (Israel) Maccabi Kafr Kanna
- (Czech Republic) Pavel Pergl - from (Germany) Dynamo Dresden
- (Israel) Lior Asulin - from (Israel) Maccabi Petah Tikva
- (Israel) David Revivo - from (Israel) F.C. Ashdod
- (Israel) Yossi Ofir - from (Israel) F.C. Ashdod

=== Out ===
- (Israel) Ofir Haim - to (Israel) Maccabi Herzliya
- (Israel) Liron Zarko - to (China) Chongqing Lifan
- (Moldova) Igor Costrov - to (Israel) Maccabi Herzliya
- (Israel) Zohar Hogeg - (Israel) Ironi Bat Yam
- (Israel) Dudi Fadlon - free agent
- (Zambia) Junstine Zulu - to (Israel) Hapoel Kfar Saba
- (Brazil) Leandro Simioni - free agent
- (Israel) Asi Rahamim - retired
- (Israel) Oren Nisim - to (Israel) Hapoel Ironi Nir Ramat HaSharon
- (Israel) Rafi Amos - to (Israel) Maccabi Be'er Sheva
- (Israel) Roy Sabag - to (Israel) Hapoel Ironi Nir Ramat HaSharon

== Hapoel Haifa ==
=== In ===
- (United States) Bryan Gerzicich - From (Israel) Hapoel Acre
- (Israel) Eden Ben Basat - From (Israel) Hapoel Tel Aviv
- (Ghana) Emmanuel Pappoe - From (Cyprus) AEK Larnaca
- (Israel) Ahmad Diab - From (Israel) Bnei Tamra

=== Out ===
- (Georgia (country)) Irakli Geferidze - to (Cyprus) AEP Paphos
- (Israel) Hamudi Kial - free agent
- (Israel) Dudu Avraham - (Israel) Ahva Arraba
- (Israel) Ran Rol - (Israel) Ahva Arraba

== Hapoel Petah Tikva ==
=== In ===
- (Israel) Kobi Dajani - from (Israel) F.C. Ashdod
- (Israel) Elnatan Salami - from (Israel) Hapoel Kfar Saba
- (Israel) Amir Lavi - from (Israel) F.C. Ashdod
- (Liberia) George Gebro - from (Hungary) Budapest Honvéd
- (Togo) Emmanuel Mathias - from (Tunisia) Espérance
- (Israel) Udi Hanoun - from (Israel) Hapoel Ironi Nir Ramat HaSharon
- (Israel) Eli Abarbanel - from (Israel) Bnei Yehuda
- (Croatia) Tomo Barlecaj - from (Switzerland) FC Winterthur
- (Ghana) Osman Bashiru - from (Ghana) King Faisal Babes

=== Out ===
- (Israel) Shimon Abuhatzira - to (Greece) AEL
- (Israel) Ori Uzan - to (Israel) F.C. Ashdod
- (Israel) Eyal Shen - to (Israel) Hapoel Be'er Sheva
- (Israel) Avi Reikan - to (Israel) Beitar Jerusalem
- (Israel) Hen Azriel - to (Israel) Beitar Jerusalem
- (Peru) Junior Viza - to (Israel) Beitar Jerusalem
- (Peru) Jair Céspedes - to (Israel) Maccabi Ahi Nazareth
- (Israel) Shavit Elimelech - retired
- (Israel) Yossi Rosen - (Israel) Hapoel Ashkelon
- (Democratic Republic of the Congo) M'peti Nimba - (Israel) Hapoel Ironi Kiryat Shmona
- (Brazil) Raphael Maltinsky - free transfer

== Hapoel Ra'anana ==
=== In ===
- (Israel) Tamir For - from (Israel) Hakoah Ramat Gan
- (Israel) Haim Pontramoli - from (Israel) Hakoah Ramat Gan
- (Israel) Avi Soffer - from (Israel) Hapoel Ramat Gan
- (Israel) Omri Atia - from (Israel) Hapoel Marmorek
- (Israel) Amir Lavi - from (Israel) F.C. Ashdod
- (Israel) Itay Elkaslasi - from (Israel) Hapoel Kfar Saba
- (Israel) Barak Daniel - from (Israel) Ironi Kiryat Ata
- (Brazil) Lira - from (Israel) Hapoel Kfar Saba

=== Out ===
- (Israel) Haim Malka - to (Israel) Hapoel Ramat Gan
- (Brazil) Breitner Morte de Carvalho - free agent
- (Israel) Akiva Megrelashvili - free agent
- (Israel) Jonathan Tennenbaum - to (Israel) Hapoel Ironi Nir Ramat HaSharon
- (Israel) Tarek Abbas - to (Israel) Maccabi Ahi Nazareth
- (Israel) Sharon Goramzano - to (Israel) Hapoel Acre
- (Israel) Lior Linder - to (Israel) Hapoel Nazareth Illit
- (Israel) Orel Edri - to (Israel) Hakoah Amidar Ramat Gan

== Hapoel Ramat Gan ==
=== In ===
- (Israel) Golan Hermon - from (Israel) Maccabi Netanya
- (Israel) Haim Malka - from (Israel) Hapoel Ra'anana
- (Ivory Coast) Serge Ayeli - from (Israel) Maccabi Ahi Nazareth
- (Israel) Benni Haddad - from (Israel) Hakoah Amidar Ramat Gan
- (Croatia) Hrvoje Kovačević - from (Israel) Bnei Yehuda
- (Israel) Ben Luz - from (Israel) Hapoel Tel Aviv
- (Israel) Amit Ohana - from (Israel) Ironi Rishon LeZion
- (Israel) Omer Peretz - from (Israel) Ironi Kiryat Shmona

=== Out ===
- (Israel) Avi Soffer - to (Israel) Hapoel Ra'anana
- (Israel) Moshe Abutbul - free agent
- (Israel) Roni Ohana - free agent
- (Israel) Kobi Shriki - (Israel) Hapoel Kfar Saba
- (Israel) Shay Revivo - to (Israel) F.C. Ashdod

== Hapoel Tel Aviv ==
=== In ===
- (Israel) Boris Klaiman - (Israel) Hapoel Kfar Saba - free transfer
- (Israel) Dedi Ben Dayan - (Israel) Maccabi Netanya - undisclosed fee
- (Israel) Michael Zandberg - (Israel) Beitar Jerusalem - free transfer
- (Georgia (country)) Zurab Menteshashvili - (Latvia) FK Ventspils - undisclosed fee
- (Israel) Itay Shechter - (Israel) Maccabi Netanya for $500,000
- (Serbia) Nemanja Vucicevic - (Germany) FC Köln - free transfer

=== Out ===
- (Israel) Yigal Antebi - (Israel) Maccabi Netanya F.C. - free transfer
- (Bulgaria) Elin Topuzakov - (Bulgaria) PFC Levski Sofia - free transfer
- (Bulgaria) Dimitar Telkiyski - (Russia) FC Amkar Perm - free transfer
- (Israel) Ben Luz - (Israel) Hapoel Ramat Gan - free transfer
- (Israel) Reuven Oved - (Israel) Bnei Sakhnin - free transfer
- (Israel) Boris Klaiman - (Israel) Maccabi Herzliya - loan
- (Israel) Galil Ben Shaanan - (Israel) Hapoel Haifa - loan
- (Israel) Lior Bakshi - (Israel) Hapoel Petah Tikva - loan
- (Israel) Manzour Amar - (Israel) Sektzia Nes Tziona - loan
- (Israel) Cfir Dar - (Israel) Hapoel Petah Tikva - loan
- (Israel) Itai Elkaslasi - (Israel) Hapoel Ra'anana - loan
- (Israel) Lior Asulin - (Israel) Hapoel Be'er Sheva - loan
- (Israel) Idan Srur - (Israel) - Hapoel Petah Tikva - loan

== Maccabi Ahi Nazareth ==
=== In ===
- (Israel) Tomer Hemed - from (Israel) Maccabi Haifa
- (Israel) Mor Dahan - from (Israel) Maccabi Haifa
- (Nigeria) Anderson West - from (Israel) Maccabi Haifa
- (Israel) Ismayil Amar - from (Israel) Maccabi Petah Tikva
- (Russia) Ruslan Nigmatullin - from (Russia) FC Lokomotiv-2 Moscow
- (Peru) Jair Céspedes - from (Israel) Hapoel Petah Tikva
- (Israel) Yakir Shina - from (Israel) Maccabi Tel Aviv
- (Israel) Yaniv Luzon - from (Israel) Bnei Sakhnin

=== Out ===
- (Ivory Coast) Serge Ayeli - to (Israel) Hapoel Ramat Gan
- (Israel) Tom Almadon - free agent
- (Israel) Eliran Hudeda - (Israel) Hapoel Nazareth Illit
- (Israel) Ram Seti - free agent
- (Israel) Haim Silvas - to (Israel) Ahva Arraba

== Maccabi Haifa ==
=== In ===
- (Nigeria) Yero Bello - return loan from (Israel) Ironi Kiryat Shmona
- (Georgia (country)) Vladimir Dvalishvili - from (Latvia) Skonto FC
- (Portugal) Jorge Teixeira - from (Cyprus) AE Paphos
- (Israel) Shai Maimon - return loan from (Israel) F.C. Ashdod

=== Out ===
- (Israel) Ronnie Gafney - to (Israel) Maccabi Tel Aviv
- (Israel) Tomer Hemed - to (Israel) Maccabi Ahi Nazareth
- (Israel) Mor Dahan - to (Israel) Maccabi Ahi Nazareth
- (Nigeria) Anderson West - to (Israel) Maccabi Ahi Nazareth
- (Israel) Gad Amos - to (Israel) Hapoel Acre
- (Israel) Omri Afek - to (Israel) Bnei Yehuda
- (United States) (Israel) Leonard Krupnik - to (United States) New York Red Bull
- (Ghana) Ransford Osei - on loan to (Netherlands) FC Twente
- (South Africa) Thembinkosi Fanteni - to (South Africa) Orlando Pirates F.C.

== Maccabi Netanya ==
=== In ===
- (Israel) Achmad Saba'a - from (Israel) Bnei Lod
- (Israel) Reef Messika - from (Israel) Ironi Ramat Hasharon
- (Israel) Maoz Samya - from (Israel) Hapoel Kfar Saba Until September 2009
- (Israel) Hen Ezra - from (Israel) Hapoel Kfar Saba
- (Israel) Alon Weisberg - from (Israel) Hakoah Amidar Ramat Gan
- (Israel) Firas Mugrabi - from youth team
- (Ghana) Okocha - return from loan (Israel) Bnei Sakhnin
- (Israel) Yigal Antebi - from (Israel) Hapoel Tel Aviv

=== Out ===
- (Costa Rica) Luis Marin - to (Costa Rica) L.D. Alajuelense
- (Panama) Alberto Zapata - to (El Salvador) Alianza FC
- (Panama) Alberto Blanco - to (Panama) San Francisco
- (Israel) Golan Hermon - to (Israel) Hapoel Ramat Gan
- (South Africa) Siyabonga Nkosi - to (South Africa) Supersport United
- (Israel) Liran Strauber - to (Israel) Maccabi Tel Aviv
- (Israel) Dedi Ben Dayan - to (Israel) Hapoel Tel Aviv
- (Israel) Avi Knafo - to (Israel) Hapoel Ra'anana
- (Israel) Itay Shechter - to (Israel) Hapoel Tel Aviv
- (Israel) Gal Nir - to (Israel) Hapoel Ironi Nir Ramat HaSharon
- (Israel) Ze'ev Haimovich - to (Russia) Terek Grozny
- (Israel) Maoz Samya

== Maccabi Petah Tikva ==
=== In ===
- (Israel) Dan Roman - from (Israel) Maccabi Tel Aviv
- (Israel) Avi Yehiel - from (Israel) Maccabi Tel Aviv
- (Croatia) Tomislav Bušić - from (Croatia) Hajduk Split
- (Israel) Morad Abu-Anza - from (Israel) Bnei Lod
- (North Macedonia) Vančo Trajanov - from (Bulgaria) Chernomorets Burgas

=== Out ===
- (North Macedonia) Boban Grncarov - to (Cyprus) APOEL Nicosia
- (Israel) Ismayil Amar - to (Israel) (Israel) Maccabi Ahi Nazareth
- (Israel) Shlomo Tzemah - to Hapoel Ironi Kiryat Shmona
- (Israel) Lior Asulin - (Israel) Bnei Sakhnin
- (Israel) Liran Cohen - free agent
- (Israel) Avi Ivgi - (Israel) Hapoel Nazareth Illit
- (Argentina) Pablo Bastianini - free agent

== Maccabi Tel Aviv ==
=== In ===
- (Israel) Yuval Avidor - from (Israel) Ironi Kiryat Shmona
- (Israel) Ronny Gafney - from (Israel) Maccabi Haifa
- (Israel) Liran Strauber - from (Israel) Maccabi Netanya
- (Israel) Tamir Cahlon - from (Israel) Bnei Yehuda
- (Slovenia) Andrej Komac - from (Sweden) Djurgårdens IF

=== Out ===
- (France) (Israel) Jonathan Assous - free agent
- (Israel) Dan Roman - to (Israel) Maccabi Petah Tikva
- (Liberia) Dulee Johnson - to (Sweden) AIK Solna
- (Israel) Avi Yehiel - to (Israel) Maccabi Petah Tikva
- (Israel) Moshe Mishaelof - to (Cyprus) Apollon Limassol
- (Serbia) (Montenegro) Dragoslav Jevrić - free agent
- (Trinidad and Tobago) Scott Sealy - free agent
- (Israel) Haim Megrelashvili - to (Netherlands) Vitesse Arnhem
- (Israel) Yakir Shina - to (Israel) Maccabi Ahi Nazareth

== See also ==
- 2009–10 Israel State Cup
- 2009–10 Toto Cup Al
