= 2009–10 Israeli Premier League =

Israeli Premier League
- Season: 2009–10
- Dates: 22 August 2009 – 22 May 2010
- Champions: Hapoel Tel Aviv; 2nd Premier League title 13th Israeli title overall
- Relegated: Hapoel Ra'anana; Maccabi Ahi Nazareth
- Champions League: Hapoel Tel Aviv (second qualifying round)
- Europa League: Maccabi Haifa (third qualifying round); Maccabi Tel Aviv (second qualifying round); Bnei Yehuda (first qualifying round)
- Matches played: 276
- Goals scored: 718 (2.6 per match)
- Top goalscorer: Shlomi Arbeitman (28)
- Biggest home win: Hapoel Tel Aviv 7–1 Hapoel Petah Tikva
- Biggest away win: Maccabi Ahi Nazareth 0–7 Hapoel Ramat Gan
- Highest scoring: Hapoel Tel Aviv 7–1 Hapoel Petah Tikva; Hapoel Tel Aviv 5–3 Hapoel Acre

The 2009–10 Israeli Premier League was the 11th season since its introduction in 1999 and the 68th season of top-tier football in Israel. It began on 22 August 2009 and ended on 15 May 2010 with the last matches of the playoff round.

On 15 May 2010, Hapoel Tel Aviv won the title in the last play-off round after Maccabi Haifa failed to win against Bnei Yehuda and they won their game against Beitar Jerusalem in a late goal at the 90+2' minute of extra time.

== Changes from 2008–09 season ==
=== Structural changes ===
The league size has been increased from twelve to sixteen teams. Further, the competition has been split into two stages, a conventional season and playoffs.

The participating clubs were first play a conventional round-robin schedule for a total of 30 matches.

The top six teams were first had to play in the Top playoff. Points earned during the regular season were halved with an odd number of points being rounded up. The round was played on a round-robin schedule. The winner after this round would win the Israeli championship and would participate in the second qualifying round of the 2010–11 UEFA Champions League. The runners-up would play in the third qualifying round of the UEFA Europa League, and the third-placed team would play in the second qualifying round of the UEFA Europa League.

If the Israel State Cup winner finishes in the top three places than the fourth-placed would play in the first qualifying round of the UEFA Europa League.

In addition, clubs ranked seventh through tenth in the regular season would engage in a placement round, while the bottom six teams played out two relegation spots and one relegation play-off.

=== Team changes ===
Locations of the 2009–10 Israeli Premier League teams

Hapoel Ironi Kiryat Shmona were directly relegated to the 2009–10 Liga Leumit after finishing the 2008–09 season in last place.

Due to the increase in the number of teams, five teams were directly promoted from the 2008–09 Liga Leumit. These were champions Hapoel Haifa, runners-up Hapoel Acre, third-placed Hapoel Be'er Sheva, fourth-placed Hapoel Ramat Gan and fifth-placed Hapoel Ra'anana.

Hakoah Amidar Ramat Gan as 11th-placed team of the Premier League and Maccabi Ahi Nazareth as sixth-placed team of Liga Leumit competed in a two-legged playoff for another spot. Maccabi Ahi Nazareth won both matches by an aggregated score of 4–2 and were promoted to the Premier League. In turn, Hakoah Ramat Gan were relegated to Liga Leumit.

== Overview ==
=== Stadia and locations ===
Club	Stadium	Capacity
Beitar Jerusalem	Teddy Stadium	21,600
Bnei Sakhnin	Doha Stadium	8,500
Bnei Yehuda	Bloomfield Stadium	15,700
F.C. Ashdod	Yud-Alef Stadium	7,800
Hapoel Acre	Green Stadium	4,000^{[A]}
Hapoel Be'er Sheva	Vasermil Stadium	13,000
Hapoel Haifa	Kiryat Eliezer Stadium	14,002
Hapoel Petah Tikva	Petah Tikva Municipal Stadium	6,800
Hapoel Ra'anana	Levita Stadium	5,800^{[A]}
Hapoel Ramat Gan	Winter Stadium	8,000^{[A]}
Hapoel Tel Aviv	Bloomfield Stadium	15,700
Maccabi Ahi Nazareth	Ilut Stadium	4,932
Maccabi Haifa	Kiryat Eliezer Stadium	14,002
Maccabi Netanya	Sar-Tov Stadium	7,500
Maccabi Petah Tikva	Petah Tikva Municipal Stadium	6,800
Maccabi Tel Aviv	Bloomfield Stadium	15,700

The club played their home games at a neutral venue because their own ground did not meet Premier League requirements.

Beitar Jerusalem	Bnei Yehuda Hapoel Tel Aviv Maccabi Tel Aviv	Hapoel Ramat Gan	Hapoel Acre
Teddy Stadium	Bloomfield Stadium	Winter Stadium	Green Stadium
Maccabi Netanya	Hapoel Haifa Maccabi Haifa	Hapoel Petah Tikva Maccabi Petah Tikva	Hapoel Ra'anana
Sar-Tov Stadium	Kiryat Eliezer Stadium	Petah Tikva Municipal Stadium	Levita Stadium
F.C. Ashdod	Bnei Sakhnin	Hapoel Be'er Sheva	Maccabi Ahi Nazareth
Yud-Alef Stadium	Doha Stadium	Vasermil Stadium	Ilut Stadium

== Managerial changes ==
Team	Outgoing manager	Manner of departure	Date of vacancy	Table	Incoming manager	Date of appointment	Table
Beitar Jerusalem	(Israel) Reuven Atar	Sacked	21 July 2009	3rd (08–09)	(Israel) Itzhak Shum	21 July 2009	Pre-Season
Maccabi Netanya	(Israel) Nati Azaria	Stepped down to assistant position	29 September 2009	16th	(Israel) Reuven Atar	29 September 2009	16th
Bnei Sakhnin	(Israel) Eran Kulik	Sacked	19 October 2009	14th	(Israel) Marco Balbul	21 October 2009	14th
Maccabi Tel Aviv	(Israel) Marco Balbul	Resigned	21 October 2009	3rd	(Israel) Nir Levine	21 October 2009	3rd
Maccabi Petah Tikva	(Israel) Ronny Levy	Resigned	21 November 2009	9th	(Israel) Freddy David	22 November 2009	9th
Hapoel Petah Tikva	(Israel) Danny Nir'on	Resigned	21 November 2009	14th	(Israel) Shavit Elimelech	22 November 2009	15th
Maccabi Ahi Nazareth	(Israel) Eli Mahpud	Sacked	8 December 2009	16th	(England) John Gregory	8 December 2009	16th
Hapoel Petah Tikva	(Israel) Shavit Elimelech	Stepped down to assistant position	16 December 2009	15th	(Israel) Eli Mahpud	16 December 2009	15th
Beitar Jerusalem	(Israel) Itzhak Shum	Sacked	20 February 2010	7th	(Israel) David Amsalem	20 February 2010	7th
Hapoel Ra'anana	(Israel) Eli Cohen	Sacked	28 February 2010	16th	(Israel) Ami Vazana	28 February 2010	16th
Hapoel Be'er Sheva	(Israel) Guy Azouri	Resigned	28 February 2010	8th	(Israel) Vico Haddad	3 March 2010	8th
Beitar Jerusalem	(Israel) David Amsalem	Stepped down to assistant position	18 March 2010	5th	(Israel) Shimon Edri	18 March 2010	5th
Hapoel Ra'anana	(Israel) Ami Vazana	End of contract	28 March 2010	16th	(Israel) Tzvika Tzemah	31 March 2010	16th
Maccabi Ahi Nazareth	(England) John Gregory	End of contract	20 May 2010	16th	(Israel) Shimon Edri	30 June 2010	Post-Season
F.C. Ashdod	(Israel) Yossi Mizrahi	Resigned	20 May 2010	6th	(England) John Gregory	20 May 2010	Post-Season

== Foreign players ==
Club	Player 1	Player 2	Player 3	Player 4	Player 5	Non-visa foreign	Former players
Beitar Jerusalem	(Peru) Junior Viza	(Peru) Paolo de la Haza	(Uruguay) **Sebastián Vázquez**				(Brazil) David Gomez (Cameroon) Joslain Mayebi
Bnei Sakhnin	(Brazil) Cadu	(Democratic Republic of the Congo) Paty Yeye Lenkebe	(Montenegro) **Đorđije Ćetković**	(Slovenia) **Nastja Čeh**	(Togo) Arafat Djako		(Peru) Jair Céspedes (Trinidad and Tobago) Scott Sealy
Bnei Yehuda	(Argentina) Pedro Galván	(Colombia) Iván Garrido	(Croatia) Siniša Linić	(Nigeria) Dele Aiyenugba			
F.C. Ashdod	(Bosnia and Herzegovina) Dragan Stojkić	(Bulgaria) Dimitar Makriev	(Cameroon) Stéphane Kingué Mpondo	(Serbia) **Marko Popović**	(Uruguay) Cristian González		(Serbia) Nenad Begović
Hapoel Acre	(Cameroon) Aka Adek Mba	(Cameroon) Emmanuel Emangoa	(Ghana) **Awudu Okocha**	(Ghana) **Ibrahim Abdul Razak**	(Liberia) **Ben Martin**	(Argentina) Jony Tenenboim^{1} (Argentina) Kevin Rainstein^{1}	(Ghana) Abedi Sarfo (Ghana) Ismail Abdul Razak (North Macedonia) Ardian Nuhiu
Hapoel Be'er Sheva	(Brazil) Danilo	(Brazil) **William Soares**	(Ghana) **Adamu Mohammed**	(Ghana) **James Bissue**		(Croatia) Tvrtko Kale^{2} (Nigeria) Dandi Okogo^{1} (United States) Ryan Adeleye^{2}	(Argentina) Marcos Galarza (Czech Republic) Pavel Pergl (Ghana) Joseph Tachie-Mensah
Hapoel Haifa	(Georgia (country)) **Levan Khmaladze**	(Nigeria) Yero Bello	(Portugal) **Rui Lima**	(Republic of the Congo) Savity Lipenia	(United States) Bryan Gerzicich		(Ghana) Emmanuel Pappoe
Hapoel Petah Tikva	(Ghana) **Daniel Addo**	(Ghana) **Ibrahim Basit**	(Ghana) Osman Bashiru	(Nigeria) Austin Ejide	(Togo) Emmanuel Mathias	(France) Jonathan Assous^{2}	(Croatia) Tomo Barlecaj (Georgia (country)) **Revaz Gotsiridze** (Kazakhstan) Mark Gurman^{2} (Liberia) George Gebro (Liberia) James Koko Lomell
Hapoel Ra'anana	(Brazil) Cristiano Pinto	(Georgia (country)) **Davit Dighmelashvili**	(Lithuania) **Irmantas Zelmikas**	(Lithuania) **Ričardas Beniušis**		(France) Steven Cohen^{2}	(Argentina) Armando Lezcano (Brazil) Lira (United States) Erik Hort^{2}
Hapoel Ramat Gan	(Brazil) **André Caldeira**	(Czech Republic) **Pavel Pergl**	(Ivory Coast) Serge Ayeli	(Nigeria) George Datoru		(Argentina) Carlos Chacana^{12}	(Brazil) William Soares (Croatia) Hrvoje Kovačević
Hapoel Tel Aviv	(Brazil) Douglas da Silva	(Croatia) **Bojan Vručina**	(Georgia (country)) Zurab Menteshashvili	(Nigeria) Vincent Enyeama	(Serbia) Nemanja Vučićević	(Netherlands) **Daniël de Ridder**^{2}	(Ghana) Samuel Yeboah
Maccabi Akhi Nazareth	(Cameroon) **Joslain Mayebi**	(Cameroon) Yves Djidda	(Democratic Republic of the Congo) Tcham N'Toya	(Nigeria) Anderson West		(Kazakhstan) Mark Gurman^{2}	(Nigeria) Michael Tukura (Peru) Jair Céspedes (Russia) Ruslan Nigmatullin (Togo) Eric Akoto
Maccabi Haifa	(Colombia) Jhon Culma	(Georgia (country)) Vladimir Dvalishvili	(Ghana) **Sadat Bukari**	(Portugal) Jorge Teixeira	(South Africa) Tsepo Masilela	(Brazil) Gustavo Boccoli^{1}	(Argentina) Eial Strahman^{2} (Brazil) Tiago Dutra
Maccabi Netanya	(Brazil) **David Gomez**	(Brazil) **Fabrício**	(Ivory Coast) Aristide Zogbo	(South Africa) Bevan Fransman		(United States) **Leonid Krupnik**^{2}	(Ghana) Awudu Okocha (Ghana) Stephen Offei
Maccabi Petah Tikva	(Croatia) Tomislav Bušić	(France) **Sébastien Sansoni**	(North Macedonia) Vančo Trajanov	(Serbia) Dragoslav Jevrić	(Serbia) **Nebojša Marinković**	(Russia) Murad Magomedov^{1}	(Argentina) Reinaldo Alderete
Maccabi Tel Aviv	(Bolivia) Ronald Raldes	(Bulgaria) Igor Tomašić	(Serbia) Ivica Iliev	(Slovenia) Andrej Komac	(Zambia) Emmanuel Mayuka	(Argentina) Guillermo Israilevich^{2} (Armenia) Yeghia Yavruyan^{1}	

In bold: Players that join the club mid-season

In Italic: Players that left the club mid-season

The following do not fill a Visa position:
^{1}Players who were born and started their professional career abroad but have since gained an Israeli passport or permanent residency, allowing them to play with Israeli status;
^{2}Players who were born and started their professional career abroad but are eligible for Israeli citizenship due to Jewish ancestry;

^{3}Israeli citizens who have chosen to represent another national team;

== Regular season ==
=== Table ===
Pos	Team	Pld	W	D	L	GF	GA	GD	Pts	Qualification
1	Maccabi Haifa	30	25	2	3	64	12	+52	77	Qualification for the championship round
2	Hapoel Tel Aviv	30	21	8	1	79	25	+54	71	Qualification for the championship round
3	Maccabi Tel Aviv	30	15	7	8	47	33	+14	52	Qualification for the championship round
4	Beitar Jerusalem	30	13	7	10	46	34	+12	46	Qualification for the championship round
5	Bnei Yehuda	30	12	9	9	37	30	+7	45 (Note: F.C. Ashdod received a technical loss of 3–0 to Bnei Yehuda for fielding an ineligible player. The original game finished in a 1–1 draw.)	Qualification for the championship round
6	F.C. Ironi Ashdod	30	11	10	9	32	31	+1	43	Qualification for the championship round
7	Bnei Sakhnin	30	11	8	11	28	29	−1	41	Qualification for the middle round
8	Hapoel Be'er Sheva	30	10	10	10	44	50	−6	40	Qualification for the middle round
9	Maccabi Netanya	30	9	9	12	41	40	+1	36	Qualification for the middle round
10	Maccabi Petah Tikva	30	8	11	11	37	43	−6	35	Qualification for the middle round
11	Hapoel Ramat Gan	30	8	9	13	26	46	−20	33	Qualification for the relegation round
12	Hapoel Haifa	30	8	8	14	39	45	−6	32	Qualification for the relegation round
13	Hapoel Petah Tikva	30	6	13	11	23	41	−18	31	Qualification for the relegation round
14	Hapoel Acre	30	4	13	13	32	46	−14	25	Qualification for the relegation round
15	Maccabi Ahi Nazareth	30	6	6	18	27	67	−40	24	Qualification for the relegation round
16	Hapoel Ra'anana	30	4	8	18	27	57	−30	20	Qualification for the relegation round

Source: Israel Football Association
Rules for classification: 1st points; 2nd goal difference; 3rd matches won; 4th goals scored; 5th head-to-head; 6th decision match.

=== Results ===
Home \ Away	BEI	BnY	BnS	ASH	HAC	HBS	HHA	HPT	HRG	HRA	HTA	MAN	MHA	MNE	MPT	MTA
Beitar Jerusalem	—	1–0	1–0	2–0	1–1	1–1	3–1	3–0	1–0	3–1	0–0	5–0	0–3	3–1	1–2	0–1
Bnei Yehuda	0–0	—	2–1	2–3	2–1	2–2	2–0	1–1	1–2	2–1	0–1	2–0	0–2	2–1	2–0	0–1
Bnei Sakhnin	0–0	2–0	—	1–0	1–0	1–1	0–3	2–0	3–1	1–1	1–2	1–1	2–1	0–3	3–4	0–0
F.C. Ironi Ashdod	2–0	0–3 (Note: F.C. Ashdod received a technical loss of 3–0 to Bnei Yehuda for fielding an ineligible player. The original game finished in a 1–1 draw.)	0–0	—	1–0	5–2	1–0	2–1	0–0	0–0	0–4	2–1	0–1	3–0	1–1	3–1
Hapoel Acre	0–3	1–1	0–0	1–1	—	1–3	2–2	0–0	1–0	1–1	1–1	0–1	0–3	1–1	2–2	2–3
Hapoel Be'er Sheva	3–2	0–0	1–0	1–0	3–2	—	2–3	2–0	1–0	2–1	1–3	2–2	1–3	2–0	0–1	1–3
Hapoel Haifa	3–2	0–3	0–1	0–1	2–4	0–0	—	1–2	1–1	3–1	1–2	2–2	0–1	0–0	2–0	3–1
Hapoel Petah Tikva	0–0	1–1	0–0	1–1	1–1	1–0	2–2	—	0–0	2–1	1–1	3–0	0–4	2–1	1–1	0–2
Hapoel Ramat Gan	0–0	0–2	1–0	1–1	1–1	2–2	3–2	0–0	—	1–0	0–3	2–3	0–5	1–0	0–3	1–4
Hapoel Ra'anana	1–3	0–3	0–1	1–1	0–1	2–2	2–1	2–1	0–1	—	1–4	1–1	1–3	1–1	3–1	0–3
Hapoel Tel Aviv	4–3	4–0	1–0	2–2	5–3	4–1	2–0	7–1	3–1	5–0	—	4–0	1–2	3–3	1–1	1–0
Maccabi Ahi Nazareth	0–1	2–2	0–2	1–0	1–0	1–4	1–3	1–2	0–1	2–1	0–4	—	0–5	1–3	1–2	3–3
Maccabi Haifa	2–1	2–0	1–0	1–0	2–1	4–1	0–0	3–0	3–1	3–0	0–0	4–1	—	2–0	2–0	1–0
Maccabi Netanya	3–0	1–1	1–2	0–1	1–0	2–2	1–2	1–0	2–3	1–1	0–3	5–0	1–0	—	2–2	1–0
Maccabi Petah Tikva	1–3	0–1	1–2	1–1	2–3	3–0	2–2	0–0	1–1	2–3	0–0	1–0	0–1	0–3	—	2–1
Maccabi Tel Aviv	4–3	0–0	3–1	2–0	1–1	1–1	1–0	1–0	3–1	2–0	2–4	0–1	1–0	2–2	1–1	—

Source: Israel Football Association
Legend: Blue = home team win; Yellow = draw; Red = away team win.

== Playoffs ==
Key numbers for pairing determination (number marks position after 30 games):

Rounds
31st	32nd	33rd	34th	35th
1 – 6; 2 – 5; 3 – 4	1 – 2; 5 – 3; 6 – 4	2 – 6; 3 – 1; 4 – 5	1 – 4; 2 – 3; 6 – 5	3 – 6; 4 – 2; 5 – 1
7 – 10; 8 – 9	7 – 8; 10 – 9	8 – 10; 9 – 7		
11 – 16; 12 – 15; 13 – 14	11 – 12; 15 – 13; 16 – 14	12 – 16; 13 – 11; 14 – 15	11 – 14; 12 – 13; 16 – 15	13 – 16; 14 – 12; 15 – 11

=== Top Playoff ===
The points obtained during the regular season were halved (and rounded up) before the start of the playoff. Thus, Maccabi Haifa started with 39 points, Hapoel Tel Aviv with 36, Maccabi Tel Aviv with 26, Beitar Jerusalem with 23, Bnei Yehuda with 23 and F.C. Ashdod started with 22.

==== Table ====
Pos	Team	Pld	W	D	L	GF	GA	GD	Pts	Qualification
1	Hapoel Tel Aviv (C)	35	25	9	1	87	26	+61	49	Qualification for the Champions League second qualifying round
2	Maccabi Haifa	35	28	3	4	72	16	+56	49	Qualification for the Europa League third qualifying round
3	Maccabi Tel Aviv	35	17	9	9	52	35	+17	34	Qualification for the Europa League second qualifying round
4	Bnei Yehuda	35	14	11	10	43	34	+9	31	Qualification for the Europa League first qualifying round (Note: As Hapoel Tel Aviv won both League and 2009–10 Israel State Cup, the State Cup finalists Bnei Yehuda received the final Europa League spot.)
5	Beitar Jerusalem	35	14	7	14	50	44	+6	26	
6	F.C. Ironi Ashdod	35	11	10	14	36	45	−9	22	

Source: Israel Football Association
Rules for classification: 1st points; 2nd goal difference; 3rd matches won; 4th goals scored; 5th head-to-head; 6th decision match.
(C) Champions

==== Results ====
Home \ Away	BEI	BnY	ASH	HTA	MHA	MTA
Beitar Jerusalem	—	0–2	—	1–2	—	—
Bnei Yehuda	—	—	—	—	1–1	0–0
F.C. Ironi Ashdod	1–2	2–3	—	—	—	—
Hapoel Tel Aviv	—	1–0	4–0	—	—	0–0
Maccabi Haifa	2–1	—	3–1	0–1	—	—
Maccabi Tel Aviv	3–0	—	2–0	—	0–2	—

Source: Israel Football Association
Legend: Blue = home team win; Yellow = draw; Red = away team win.

=== Middle Playoff ===
The points obtained during the regular season were halved (and rounded up) before the start of the playoff. Thus, Bnei Sakhnin started with 21 points, Hapoel Be'er Sheva with 20, Maccabi Netanya with 18 and Maccabi Petah Tikva started with 18.

==== Table ====
Pos	Team	Pld	W	D	L	GF	GA	GD	Pts
7	Bnei Sakhnin	33	13	8	12	31	31	0	27
8	Maccabi Petah Tikva	33	10	11	12	44	47	−3	24
9	Hapoel Be'er Sheva	33	11	10	12	49	55	−6	23
10	Maccabi Netanya	33	10	9	14	44	47	−3	21

Source: Israel Football Association
Rules for classification: 1st points; 2nd goal difference; 3rd matches won; 4th goals scored; 5th head-to-head; 6th decision match.

==== Results ====
Home \ Away	BnS	HBS	MNE	MPT
Bnei Sakhnin	—	1–0	—	2–0
Hapoel Be'er Sheva	—	—	4–0	1–4
Maccabi Netanya	2–0	—	—	—
Maccabi Petah Tikva	—	—	3–1	—

Source: Israel Football Association
Legend: Blue = home team win; Yellow = draw; Red = away team win.

=== Bottom Playoff ===
The points obtained during the regular season were halved (and rounded up) before the start of the playoff. Thus, Hapoel Ramat Gan started with 17 points, Hapoel Haifa with 16, Hapoel Petah Tikva with 16, Hapoel Acre with 13, Maccabi Ahi Nazareth with 12 and Hapoel Ra'anana started with 10.

==== Table ====
Pos	Team	Pld	W	D	L	GF	GA	GD	Pts	Qualification or relegation
11	Hapoel Haifa	35	10	9	16	44	50	−6	23	
12	Hapoel Acre	35	7	14	14	38	52	−14	23	
13	Hapoel Petah Tikva	35	8	14	13	28	48	−20	23	
14	Hapoel Ramat Gan (O)	35	9	11	15	34	49	−15	22	Qualification for the relegation play-offs
15	Hapoel Ra'anana (R)	35	6	10	19	33	58	−25	18	Relegation to Liga Leumit
16	Maccabi Ahi Nazareth (R)	35	7	7	21	33	81	−48	16	Relegation to Liga Leumit

Source: Israel Football Association
Rules for classification: 1st points; 2nd goal difference; 3rd matches won; 4th goals scored; 5th head-to-head; 6th decision match.
(O) Play-off winners; (R) Relegated

==== Results ====
Home \ Away	HAC	HHA	HRA	HRG	MAN	HPT
Hapoel Acre	—	1–0	—	—	3–1	—
Hapoel Haifa	—	—	1–0	—	2–2	1–2
Hapoel Ra'anana	4–0	—	—	—	2–0	—
Hapoel Ramat Gan	0–0	0–1	0–0	—	—	—
Maccabi Ahi Nazareth	—	—	—	0–7	—	3–0
Hapoel Petah Tikva	1–2	—	0–0	2–1	—	—

Source: Israel Football Association
Legend: Blue = home team win; Yellow = draw; Red = away team win.

== Relegation playoff ==
The 14th-placed team Hapoel Ramat Gan faced the 3rd-placed Liga Leumit team Hapoel Kfar Saba. The winner Hapoel Ramat Gan earned a spot in the 2010–11 Israeli Premier League. The match took place on 22 May 2010.

22 May 2010
18:45 UTC+3

Hapoel Ramat Gan	1–0	Hapoel Kfar Saba
Hermon 84'	Report (in Hebrew)

Haberfeld Stadium, Rishon LeZion
Attendance: 4,000
Referee: Eitan Tabrizi

== Season statistics ==
=== Scoring ===
- First goal of the season: Shahar Balilti for Hapoel Petah Tikva against Maccabi Ahi Nazareth, 61st minute (22 August 2009)
- Fastest goal in a match: 17 seconds – Maor Buzaglo for Maccabi Tel Aviv against Beitar Jerusalem (17 April 2010)
- Widest winning margin: 7 goals – Maccabi Ahi Nazareth 0–7 Hapoel Ramat Gan (15 May 2010)
- Most goals in a match: 8 goals –
  - Hapoel Tel Aviv 7–1 Hapoel Petah Tikva (21 November 2009)
  - Hapoel Tel Aviv 5–3 Hapoel Acre (27 March 2010)

=== Discipline ===
- First yellow card of the season: Gal Cohen for Hapoel Petah Tikva against Maccabi Ahi Nazareth, 40th minute (22 August 2009)
- First red card of the season: Ismail Abdul Razak for Hapoel Acre against Maccabi Haifa, 72nd minute (22 August 2009)

== Top scorers ==
Rank	Scorer	Club	Goals
1	(Israel) Shlomi Arbeitman	Maccabi Haifa	28
2	(Israel) Itay Shechter	Hapoel Tel Aviv	22
3	(Georgia (country)) Vladimir Dvalishvili	Maccabi Haifa	16
3	(Israel) Barak Yitzhaki	Beitar Jerusalem	16
5	(Bulgaria) Dimitar Makriev	F.C. Ashdod	13^{[B]}
6	(Argentina) Pedro Galván	Bnei Yehuda	12
6	(Israel) Toto Tamuz	Beitar Jerusalem	12
8	(Israel) Idan Shriki	F.C. Ashdod	11
8	(Israel) Dedi Ben Dayan	Hapoel Tel Aviv	11
8	(Israel) Eran Levy	Hapoel Haifa	11
8	(Israel) Eran Zahavi	Hapoel Tel Aviv	11
Total			718
Average per game			2.6

^B The IFA also recognize Dimitar Makrievs goal in favour of F.C. Ashdod against Bnei Yehuda game which was later annulled because F.C. Ashdod fielded an ineligible player, for that F.C. Ashdod received a technical loss of 3–0. The original game finished in a 1–1 draw.

== See also ==
- 2009–10 Israel State Cup
- 2009–10 Toto Cup Al
- List of 2009–10 Israeli football summer transfers
- List of 2009–10 Israeli football winter transfers
