= List of 2009–10 Israeli football winter transfers =

This is a list of Israeli football transfers in the winter transfer window 2009–10 by club.

== Israeli Premier league ==
=== Beitar Jerusalem ===
In: Note: Flags indicate national team as defined under FIFA eligibility rules; some limited exceptions apply. Players may hold more than one non-FIFA nationality.

No.	Pos.	Nation	Player
—	MF	URU	Sebastián Vázquez (From Chornomorets Odesa)

Out: Note: Flags indicate national team as defined under FIFA eligibility rules; some limited exceptions apply. Players may hold more than one non-FIFA nationality.

No.	Pos.	Nation	Player
—	FW	BRA	David Gomez (To Maccabi Netanya)
—	GK	CMR	Joslain Mayebi (Loan return to Hakoah Amidar Ramat Gan)

=== Bnei Sakhnin ===
In: Note: Flags indicate national team as defined under FIFA eligibility rules; some limited exceptions apply. Players may hold more than one non-FIFA nationality.

No.	Pos.	Nation	Player
—	MF	MNE	Đorđije Ćetković (Free transfer)
—	MF	ISR	Liran Cohen (from Bnei Yehuda)
—	DF	ISR	Liron Zarko (from Chongqing Lifan)
—	MF	SVN	Nastja Čeh (from Rijeka)

Out: Note: Flags indicate national team as defined under FIFA eligibility rules; some limited exceptions apply. Players may hold more than one non-FIFA nationality.

No.	Pos.	Nation	Player
—	DF	PER	Jair Céspedes (to Universidad César Vallejo)
—	FW	TRI	Scott Sealy (Released)
—	MF	ISR	Reuven Oved (to Hapoel Petah Tikva)
—	MF	ISR	Eli Biton (to Hapoel Petah Tikva)

=== Bnei Yehuda Tel Aviv ===
In: Note: Flags indicate national team as defined under FIFA eligibility rules; some limited exceptions apply. Players may hold more than one non-FIFA nationality.

No.	Pos.	Nation	Player
—	GK	ISR	Michael Magen (Free transfer)
—	MF	ISR	Michael Zandberg (from Hapoel Tel Aviv)

Out: Note: Flags indicate national team as defined under FIFA eligibility rules; some limited exceptions apply. Players may hold more than one non-FIFA nationality.

No.	Pos.	Nation	Player
25	MF	ISR	Liran Cohen (to Bnei Sakhnin)
19	FW	ISR	Omer Rapps (Loan return to Hakoah Amidar Ramat Gan)

=== F.C. Ashdod ===
In: Note: Flags indicate national team as defined under FIFA eligibility rules; some limited exceptions apply. Players may hold more than one non-FIFA nationality.

No.	Pos.	Nation	Player
—	DF	ISR	Maor Zohar (Loan return from Hakoah Amidar Ramat Gan)
—	DF	ISR	Naor Peser (from Maccabi Petah Tikva)
—	DF	SRB	Marko Popović (from NK Maribor)

Out: Note: Flags indicate national team as defined under FIFA eligibility rules; some limited exceptions apply. Players may hold more than one non-FIFA nationality.

No.	Pos.	Nation	Player
—	DF	ISR	Maor Zohar (On loan to Hapoel Ra'anana)
—	FW	ISR	Barak Badash (On loan to Hapoel Be'er Sheva)
—	DF	ISR	Ori Uzan (to Maccabi Petah Tikva)
10	MF	ISR	Baruch Dego (to Nea Salamis Famagusta)

=== Hapoel Acre ===
In: Note: Flags indicate national team as defined under FIFA eligibility rules; some limited exceptions apply. Players may hold more than one non-FIFA nationality.

No.	Pos.	Nation	Player
—	MF	GHA	Ibrahim Abdul Razak (from Al-Ittihad Al-Sakndary)
—	FW	GHA	Okocha (From Maccabi Netanya)
—	FW	LBR	Ben Martin (Free transfer)

Out: Note: Flags indicate national team as defined under FIFA eligibility rules; some limited exceptions apply. Players may hold more than one non-FIFA nationality.

No.	Pos.	Nation	Player
—	MF	GHA	Ismail Abdul Razak (to Hakoah Amidar Ramat Gan)
—	DF	ISR	Eitan Azaria (Released)

=== Hapoel Be'er Sheva ===
In: Note: Flags indicate national team as defined under FIFA eligibility rules; some limited exceptions apply. Players may hold more than one non-FIFA nationality.

No.	Pos.	Nation	Player
—	FW	GHA	James Bissue (from Eleven Wise)
—	DF	GHA	Adamu Mohammed (from Eleven Wise)
—	MF	BRA	William Soares (from Hapoel Ramat Gan)
—	FW	ISR	Barak Badash (On loan from F.C. Ashdod)

Out: Note: Flags indicate national team as defined under FIFA eligibility rules; some limited exceptions apply. Players may hold more than one non-FIFA nationality.

No.	Pos.	Nation	Player
—	DF	CZE	Pavel Pergl (to Hapoel Ramat Gan)
—	DF	ISR	Yaniv Elul (to Hapoel Ashkelon)

=== Hapoel Haifa ===
In: Note: Flags indicate national team as defined under FIFA eligibility rules; some limited exceptions apply. Players may hold more than one non-FIFA nationality.

No.	Pos.	Nation	Player
—	GK	ISR	Ohad Cohen (On loan from Maccabi Petah Tikva)
—	MF	GEO	Levan Khmaladze (from Dinamo Tbilisi)
—	MF	POR	Rui Lima (from Nea Salamina Famagusta)

Out: Note: Flags indicate national team as defined under FIFA eligibility rules; some limited exceptions apply. Players may hold more than one non-FIFA nationality.

No.	Pos.	Nation	Player
—	DF	GHA	Emmanuel Pappoe (Released, then moved to Beitar Shimshon Tel Aviv)

=== Hapoel Petah Tikva ===
In: Note: Flags indicate national team as defined under FIFA eligibility rules; some limited exceptions apply. Players may hold more than one non-FIFA nationality.

No.	Pos.	Nation	Player
23	FW	GEO	Revaz Gotsiridze (from Spartaki-Tskhinvali Tbilisi)
—	DF	ISR	Amiran Shkalim (On loan from Maccabi Tel Aviv)
17	DF	ISR	Sagiv Cohen (Loan return from Ironi Nir Ramat HaSharon)
—	DF	GHA	Daniel Addo (from Gençlerbirliği)
—	FW	GHA	Ibrahim Bassit (Free transfer)
—	MF	ISR	Reuven Oved (from Bnei Sakhnin)
—	MF	ISR	Eli Biton (from Bnei Sakhnin)

Out: Note: Flags indicate national team as defined under FIFA eligibility rules; some limited exceptions apply. Players may hold more than one non-FIFA nationality.

No.	Pos.	Nation	Player
23	FW	GEO	Revaz Gotsiridze (Released then moved to Ahva Arraba)

=== Hapoel Ra'anana ===
In: Note: Flags indicate national team as defined under FIFA eligibility rules; some limited exceptions apply. Players may hold more than one non-FIFA nationality.

No.	Pos.	Nation	Player
—	FW	LTU	Ričardas Beniušis (From FK Sūduva)
—	DF	ISR	Maor Zohar (On loan from F.C. Ashdod)
—	DF	LTU	Irmantas Zelmikas (From Marijampolės Sūduva)
23	MF	GEO	Davit Dighmelashvili (From Dinamo Tbilisi)

Out: Note: Flags indicate national team as defined under FIFA eligibility rules; some limited exceptions apply. Players may hold more than one non-FIFA nationality.

No.	Pos.	Nation	Player

=== Hapoel Ramat Gan ===
In: Note: Flags indicate national team as defined under FIFA eligibility rules; some limited exceptions apply. Players may hold more than one non-FIFA nationality.

No.	Pos.	Nation	Player
20	MF	ISR	Omer Buchsenbaum (From Maccabi Petah Tikva)
—	DF	BRA	André Caldeira (from AEL Limassol)
—	DF	CZE	Pavel Pergl (from Hapoel Be'er Sheva)
—	DF	ISR	Matan Lutati (on loan from Maccabi Tel Aviv)

Out: Note: Flags indicate national team as defined under FIFA eligibility rules; some limited exceptions apply. Players may hold more than one non-FIFA nationality.

No.	Pos.	Nation	Player
10	MF	ISR	Kobi Hassan (Released)
21	MF	CRO	Hrvoje Kovačević (Released)
5	DF	ISR	Haim Malka (Released, then moved to Hakoah Amidar Ramat Gan)
—	MF	BRA	William Soares (to Hapoel Be'er Sheva)

=== Hapoel Tel Aviv ===
In: Note: Flags indicate national team as defined under FIFA eligibility rules; some limited exceptions apply. Players may hold more than one non-FIFA nationality.

No.	Pos.	Nation	Player
—	GK	ISR	Boris Klaiman (Loan return from Maccabi Herzliya)
—	MF	NED	Daniël de Ridder (On loan from Wigan Athletic until the end of the season)
—	DF	BOL	Miguel Hoyos (from Club Bolívar)
—	FW	CRO	Bojan Vručina (from Slaven Belupo)
—	DF	ISR	Mor Shushan (from Hapoel Nazareth Illit)

Out: Note: Flags indicate national team as defined under FIFA eligibility rules; some limited exceptions apply. Players may hold more than one non-FIFA nationality.

No.	Pos.	Nation	Player
11	FW	GHA	Samuel Yeboah (to K.R.C. Genk)
—	DF	ISR	Rami Duani (On loan to Maccabi Ahi Nazareth)
—	DF	BOL	Miguel Hoyos (Released)
—	MF	ISR	Michael Zandberg (to Bnei Yehuda)
—	DF	ISR	Lior Bakshi (On loan to Hapoel Jerusalem)

=== Maccabi Ahi Nazareth ===
In: Note: Flags indicate national team as defined under FIFA eligibility rules; some limited exceptions apply. Players may hold more than one non-FIFA nationality.

No.	Pos.	Nation	Player
—	DF	ISR	Rami Duani (On loan from Hapoel Tel Aviv)
—	GK	CMR	Joslain Mayebi (On loan from Hakoah Amidar Ramat Gan)

Out: Note: Flags indicate national team as defined under FIFA eligibility rules; some limited exceptions apply. Players may hold more than one non-FIFA nationality.

No.	Pos.	Nation	Player
—	DF	TOG	Éric Akoto (To OFI)

=== Maccabi Haifa ===
In: Note: Flags indicate national team as defined under FIFA eligibility rules; some limited exceptions apply. Players may hold more than one non-FIFA nationality.

No.	Pos.	Nation	Player
—	MF	GHA	Sadat Bukari (From Étoile Sportive du Sahel)

Out: Note: Flags indicate national team as defined under FIFA eligibility rules; some limited exceptions apply. Players may hold more than one non-FIFA nationality.

No.	Pos.	Nation	Player

=== Maccabi Netanya ===
In: Note: Flags indicate national team as defined under FIFA eligibility rules; some limited exceptions apply. Players may hold more than one non-FIFA nationality.

No.	Pos.	Nation	Player
—	FW	BRA	David Gomez (From Beitar Jerusalem)
—	DF	ISR	Leonard Krupnik (From New York Red Bulls)
—	MF	BRA	Fabrício Silva Cabral (From Terek Grozny)

Out: Note: Flags indicate national team as defined under FIFA eligibility rules; some limited exceptions apply. Players may hold more than one non-FIFA nationality.

No.	Pos.	Nation	Player
—	FW	GHA	Okocha (Released then moved to Hapoel Acre)

=== Maccabi Petah Tikva ===
In: Note: Flags indicate national team as defined under FIFA eligibility rules; some limited exceptions apply. Players may hold more than one non-FIFA nationality.

No.	Pos.	Nation	Player
22	GK	MNE	Dragoslav Jevrić (Free transfer)
18	DF	ISR	Haim Megrelashvili (Free transfer)
3	DF	FRA	Sébastien Sansoni (Free transfer)
—	DF	ISR	Ori Uzan (from F.C. Ashdod)
—	MF	SRB	Nebojša Marinković (Free Transfer)

Out: Note: Flags indicate national team as defined under FIFA eligibility rules; some limited exceptions apply. Players may hold more than one non-FIFA nationality.

No.	Pos.	Nation	Player
20	MF	ISR	Omer Buchsenbaum (to Hapoel Ramat Gan)
—	GK	ISR	Ohad Cohen (On loan to Hapoel Haifa)

=== Maccabi Tel Aviv ===
In: Note: Flags indicate national team as defined under FIFA eligibility rules; some limited exceptions apply. Players may hold more than one non-FIFA nationality.

No.	Pos.	Nation	Player

Out: Note: Flags indicate national team as defined under FIFA eligibility rules; some limited exceptions apply. Players may hold more than one non-FIFA nationality.

No.	Pos.	Nation	Player
—	DF	ISR	Amiran Shkalim (On loan to Hapoel Petah Tikva)
—	DF	ISR	Matan Lutati (On loan to Hapoel Ramat Gan)

== Liga Leumit ==
=== Ahva Arraba ===
In: Note: Flags indicate national team as defined under FIFA eligibility rules; some limited exceptions apply. Players may hold more than one non-FIFA nationality.

No.	Pos.	Nation	Player
—	FW	GEO	Revaz Gotsiridze (From Hapoel Petah Tikva)

Out: Note: Flags indicate national team as defined under FIFA eligibility rules; some limited exceptions apply. Players may hold more than one non-FIFA nationality.

No.	Pos.	Nation	Player

=== Hakoah Amidar Ramat Gan ===
In: Note: Flags indicate national team as defined under FIFA eligibility rules; some limited exceptions apply. Players may hold more than one non-FIFA nationality.

No.	Pos.	Nation	Player
—	GK	CMR	Joslain Mayebi (Loan return from Beitar Jerusalem)
—	MF	GHA	Ismail Abdul Razak (From Hapoel Acre)
5	DF	ISR	Haim Malka (free transfer, latest with Hapoel Ramat Gan)
—	DF	ISR	Yogev Ben Simon (free transfer)
—	MF	ARG	Armando Lescano (On loan from Hapoel Ra'anana)
—	MF	ISR	Kobi Hassan (Free transfer, latest with Hapoel Ramat Gan)
—	DF	ISR	Adi Sheleg (From Maccabi Kfar Yonna)
—	FW	ISR	Omer Rapps (Loan return from Bnei Yehuda)

Out: Note: Flags indicate national team as defined under FIFA eligibility rules; some limited exceptions apply. Players may hold more than one non-FIFA nationality.

No.	Pos.	Nation	Player
—	DF	ISR	Maor Zohar (On return to F.C. Ashdod)
—	GK	CMR	Joslain Mayebi (On loan to Maccabi Ahi Nazareth)
11	MF	NGA	Felix Ogbuke (Released)

=== Beitar Shimshon Tel Aviv ===
In: Note: Flags indicate national team as defined under FIFA eligibility rules; some limited exceptions apply. Players may hold more than one non-FIFA nationality.

No.	Pos.	Nation	Player
—	DF	GHA	Emmanuel Pappoe (Free transfer, latest with Hapoel Haifa)

Out: Note: Flags indicate national team as defined under FIFA eligibility rules; some limited exceptions apply. Players may hold more than one non-FIFA nationality.

No.	Pos.	Nation	Player

=== Sektzia Nes Tziona ===
In: Note: Flags indicate national team as defined under FIFA eligibility rules; some limited exceptions apply. Players may hold more than one non-FIFA nationality.

No.	Pos.	Nation	Player
—	MF	GEO	Shota Babunashvili (from Olimpi Rustavi)
10	FW	GEO	Giorgi Chelidze (from Samsunspor)

Out: Note: Flags indicate national team as defined under FIFA eligibility rules; some limited exceptions apply. Players may hold more than one non-FIFA nationality.

No.	Pos.	Nation	Player
10	FW	ISR	Shay Abuksis (On loan to Hapoel Hadera)
7	FW	NGA	Anthony Eviparker (to Maccabi Herzliya)

=== Hapoel Ashkelon ===
In: Note: Flags indicate national team as defined under FIFA eligibility rules; some limited exceptions apply. Players may hold more than one non-FIFA nationality.

No.	Pos.	Nation	Player
—	DF	ISR	Yaniv Elul (From Hapoel Be'er Sheva)

Out: Note: Flags indicate national team as defined under FIFA eligibility rules; some limited exceptions apply. Players may hold more than one non-FIFA nationality.

No.	Pos.	Nation	Player

=== Hapoel Ironi Kiryat Shmona ===
In: Note: Flags indicate national team as defined under FIFA eligibility rules; some limited exceptions apply. Players may hold more than one non-FIFA nationality.

No.	Pos.	Nation	Player
25	FW	MKD	Zoran Baldovaliev (From Lokomotiv Sofia)

Out: Note: Flags indicate national team as defined under FIFA eligibility rules; some limited exceptions apply. Players may hold more than one non-FIFA nationality.

No.	Pos.	Nation	Player

=== Maccabi Ironi Bat Yam ===
In: Note: Flags indicate national team as defined under FIFA eligibility rules; some limited exceptions apply. Players may hold more than one non-FIFA nationality.

No.	Pos.	Nation	Player
—	FW	BRA	Leandro Simioni (Free transfer)

Out: Note: Flags indicate national team as defined under FIFA eligibility rules; some limited exceptions apply. Players may hold more than one non-FIFA nationality.

No.	Pos.	Nation	Player
