= 2009–10 Liga Leumit =

Liga Leumit
- Season: 2009–10
- Champions: Ironi Kiryat Shmona
- Promoted: Ironi Kiryat Shmona; Hapoel Ashkelon
- Relegated: Hapoel Marmorek; Hapoel Jerusalem
- Matches played: 276
- Goals scored: 652 (2.36 per match)
- Top goalscorer: Akaki Mikuchadze (18)

The 2009–10 Liga Leumit was the 11th season since it became the second-tier in 1999 and the 68th season of second-tier football in Israel. It began on 21 August 2009 and ended on 15 May 2010.

== Changes from 2008–09 season ==
=== Structure changes ===
League size has been increased from twelve to sixteen teams for this season, teams will thus play a home-and-away round-robin schedule for a total of 30 matches.

After the conclusion of this "regular season", teams will be split up into three playoff groups according to their league position. Points earned during the season will be halved and taken over to the respective playoff group. The best six teams will compete for the promotion spots. Clubs ranked 7th through 10th will engage in a placement round, while the bottom six teams will play out two relegation spots.

=== Team changes ===
Location of teams in the 2009–10 Liga Leumit

Maccabi Kiryat Ata were directly relegated to the 2009–10 Liga Alef after finishing the 2008–09 season in last place.

Due to the increase in the number of teams, seven teams were directly promoted from the 2008–09 Liga Artzit. These were champions Sektzia Nes Tziona, runners-up Hapoel Ashkelon, third-placed Hapoel Marmorek, fourth-placed Hapoel Rishon LeZion, fifth-placed Ironi Bat Yam, sixth-placed Beitar Shimshon Tel Aviv and seventh-placed Hapoel Nazareth Illit.

In addition, five teams were directly promoted from the 2008–09 Liga Leumit to the 2009–10 Israeli Premier League. These were champions Hapoel Haifa, runners-up Hapoel Acre, third-placed Hapoel Be'er Sheva, fourth-placed Hapoel Ramat Gan and fifth-placed Hapoel Ra'anana.

== Overview ==
=== Stadia and locations ===
Club	Stadium	Capacity
Ahva Arraba	Doha Stadium	8,500
Beitar Shimshon Tel Aviv	Hatikva Neighborhood Stadium	6,500
Hakoah Ramat Gan	Winter Stadium	8,000
Hapoel Ashkelon	Sala Stadium	5,250
Hapoel Bnei Lod	Lod Municipal Stadium	3,000
Hapoel Jerusalem	Teddy Stadium	21,600
Hapoel Kfar Saba	Levita Stadium	5,800
Hapoel Marmorek	Haberfeld Stadium	6,000
Hapoel Nazareth Illit	Green Stadium	4,000
Ironi Bat Yam	Bat Yam Municipal Stadium	3,100
Ironi Kiryat Shmona	Kiryat Shmona Municipal Stadium	5,300
Ironi Ramat HaSharon	Grundman Stadium	2,200
Hapoel Rishon LeZion	Haberfeld Stadium	6,000
Maccabi Be'er Sheva	Vasermil Stadium	13,000
Maccabi Herzliya	Herzliya Municipal Stadium	8,100
Sektzia Nes Tziona	Ness Ziona Stadium	6,000

== Regular season ==
=== Regular season table ===
Pos	Team	Pld	W	D	L	GF	GA	GD	Pts	Promotion or relegation
1	Ironi Kiryat Shmona	30	18	8	4	43	20	+23	62	Top Playoff
2	Hapoel Kfar Saba (Note: Hapoel Kfar Saba received a technical loss of 3–0 to Ironi Rishon LeZion for fielding an ineligible player. The original game was finished in a 0–0 draw.)	30	14	9	7	47	37	+10	51	Top Playoff
3	Sektzia Nes Tziona	30	11	14	5	33	21	+12	47	Top Playoff
4	Ironi Nir Ramat HaSharon (Note: Hapoel Ashkelon received a technical loss of 3–0 to Ironi Ramat HaSharon for fielding an ineligible player. The original game was finished in a 0–2 win for Hapoel Ashkelon.)	30	12	10	8	44	27	+17	46	Top Playoff
5	Ironi Bat Yam	30	13	6	11	35	29	+6	45	Top Playoff
6	Hapoel Ashkelon	30	11	11	8	41	35	+6	44	Top Playoff
7	Hapoel Nazareth Illit	30	10	13	7	34	23	+11	43	Middle Playoff
8	Ahva Arraba (Note: Maccabi Be'er Sheva received a technical loss of 3–0 to Ahva Arraba for fielding an ineligible player. The original game was finished in a 1–1 draw.)	30	12	8	10	35	32	+3	43 (Note: Ahva Arraba were deducted one point for editing double contracts with several players.)	Middle Playoff
9	Hapoel Rishon LeZion	30	11	7	12	35	28	+7	40	Middle Playoff
10	Maccabi Herzliya	30	10	10	10	28	24	+4	40	Middle Playoff
11	Hapoel Bnei Lod	30	9	12	9	31	30	+1	39	Bottom Playoff
12	Hakoah Amidar Ramat Gan	30	9	11	10	36	39	−3	38	Bottom Playoff
13	Maccabi Be'er Sheva	30	11	3	16	37	49	−12	36	Bottom Playoff
14	Beitar Shimshon Tel Aviv	30	7	12	11	27	42	−15	33	Bottom Playoff
15	Hapoel Jerusalem	30	5	8	17	35	61	−26	23	Bottom Playoff
16	Hapoel Marmorek	30	2	8	20	19	63	−44	14	Bottom Playoff

Source: Israel Football Association
Rules for classification: 1st points; 2nd goal difference; 3rd matches won; 4th goals scored; 5th head-to-head; 6th decision match.

=== Regular season results ===
Home \ Away	AHV	BTA	HAR	HAS	HBL	HJE	HKS	HMK	HNI	HRL	IBY	IKS	IRH	MBS	MHE	SNT
Ahva Arraba		1–0	0–1	2–1	1–1	2–1	2–1	3–0	1–1	1–0	1–0	0–0	1–1	3–0 (Note: Maccabi Be'er Sheva received a technical loss of 3–0 to Ahva Arraba for fielding an ineligible player. The original game was finished in a 1–1 draw.)	1–0	2–2
Beitar Shimshon Tel Aviv	0–0		1–1	2–2	1–1	0–0	0–2	1–0	0–0	2–1	2–3	1–3	1–1	0–1	0–1	0–0
Hakoah Amidar Ramat Gan	2–2	0–1		1–2	1–2	3–2	2–2	0–0	2–4	2–1	2–1	0–2	0–1	3–0	0–0	1–1
Hapoel Ashkelon	3–1	5–0	0–1		1–1	6–1	0–0	1–1	1–1	1–0	1–0	0–0	1–1	3–0	1–0	1–1
Hapoel Bnei Lod	2–0	1–2	1–1	0–0		2–0	1–1	0–2	1–1	3–2	0–2	1–0	0–1	4–1	0–0	0–1
Hapoel Jerusalem	1–4	2–2	3–3	2–1	2–1		0–1	2–2	2–1	1–1	1–2	2–4	2–0	0–1	1–2	1–1
Hapoel Kfar Saba	0–0	0–0	2–1	4–0	2–2	1–2		1–0	2–1	2–1	2–3	3–1	2–1	5–1	3–2	2–0
Hapoel Marmorek	3–2	0–1	0–1	1–3	0–2	1–1	1–1		0–0	0–3	1–2	0–4	0–2	1–3	1–2	2–2
Hapoel Nazareth Illit	2–0	4–0	1–2	0–0	2–0	2–1	4–1	0–0		1–1	0–0	2–0	0–0	1–0	1–0	0–0
Hapoel Rishon LeZion	3–0	2–3	0–0	2–2	1–0	1–0	3–0 (Note: Hapoel Kfar Saba received a technical loss of 3–0 to Hapoel Rishon LeZion for fielding an ineligible player. The original game was finished in a 0–0 draw.)	3–0	1–0		1–2	0–1	0–1	2–1	1–1	0–0
Ironi Bat Yam	1–1	2–0	1–2	1–2	0–1	1–0	1–3	3–0	1–0	3–0		0–1	2–2	2–0	0–3	0–0
Ironi Kiryat Shmona	1–0	0–0	1–0	3–1	3–1	3–0	0–0	3–2	1–1	1–0	2–1		1–0	3–1	1–0	0–0
Ironi Nir Ramat HaSharon	0–1	3–2	4–1	3–0 (Note: Hapoel Ashkelon received a technical loss of 3–0 to Ironi Ramat HaSharon for fielding an ineligible player. The original game was finished in a 0–2 win for Hapoel Ashkelon.)	1–1	3–3	1–1	5–0	1–1	0–1	0–1	1–1		5–1	0–1	3–1
Maccabi Be'er Sheva	2–1	4–2	0–0	3–0	1–2	5–0	1–1	5–1	3–1	1–1	1–0	0–3	0–1		1–1	0–1
Maccabi Herzliya	0–2	1–2	1–1	1–2	0–0	3–1	0–2	4–0	2–1	0–0	0–0	0–0	1–0	1–0		0–0
Sektzia Nes Tziona	2–0	1–1	3–2	2–0	0–0	2–1	3–0	3–0	0–1	0–1	0–0	3–0	0–2	2–0	2–1	

Source: Israel Football Association
Legend: Blue = home team win; Yellow = draw; Red = away team win.

== Playoffs ==
Key numbers for pairing determination (number marks position after 30 games):

Rounds
31st	32nd	33rd	34th	35th
1 – 6; 2 – 5; 3 – 4	1 – 2; 5 – 3; 6 – 4	2 – 6; 3 – 1; 4 – 5	1 – 4; 2 – 3; 6 – 5	3 – 6; 4 – 2; 5 – 1
7 – 10; 8 – 9	7 – 8; 10 – 9	8 – 10; 9 – 7		
11 – 16; 12 – 15; 13 – 14	11 – 12; 15 – 13; 16 – 14	12 – 16; 13 – 11; 14 – 15	11 – 14; 12 – 13; 16 – 15	13 – 16; 14 – 12; 15 – 11

=== Top Playoff ===
The points obtained during the regular season were halved (and rounded up) before the start of the playoff. Thus, Ironi Kiryat Shmona started with 31 points, Hapoel Kfar Saba with 26, Sektzia Nes Tziona with 24, Ironi Ramat HaSharon with 23, Ironi Bat Yam with 23 and Hapoel Ashkelon started with 22.

==== Top Playoff table ====
Pos	Team	Pld	W	D	L	GF	GA	GD	Pts	Promotion or relegation
1	Ironi Kiryat Shmona (C, P)	35	21	9	5	51	22	+29	41	Promotion to Israeli Premier League
2	Hapoel Ashkelon (P)	35	15	11	9	47	42	+5	34	Promotion to Israeli Premier League
3	Hapoel Kfar Saba	35	16	9	10	56	47	+9	32	Qualification for promotion play-offs
4	Sektzia Nes Tziona	35	13	15	7	45	29	+16	31	
5	Ironi Nir Ramat HaSharon	35	13	11	11	50	37	+13	27	
6	Ironi Bat Yam	35	14	7	14	43	41	+2	27	

Source: Israel Football Association
Rules for classification: 1st points; 2nd goal difference; 3rd matches won; 4th goals scored; 5th head-to-head; 6th decision match.
(C) Champions; (P) Promoted

==== Top Playoff results ====
Home \ Away	HAS	HKS	IBY	IKS	IRH	SNT
Hapoel Ashkelon			1–0		1–0	
Hapoel Kfar Saba	1–2		5–2			1–2
Ironi Bat Yam				0–0		4–3
Ironi Kiryat Shmona	1–2	3–0			3–0	
Ironi Nir Ramat HaSharon		1–2	3–2			
Sektzia Nes Tziona	5–0			0–1	2–2	

Source: Israel Football Association
Legend: Blue = home team win; Yellow = draw; Red = away team win.

=== Middle Playoff ===
The points obtained during the regular season were halved (and rounded up) before the start of the playoff. Thus, Hapoel Nazareth Illit started with 22 points, Ahva Arraba with 22, Hapoel Rishon LeZion with 20 and Maccabi Herzliya started with 20.

==== Middle Playoff table ====
Pos	Team	Pld	W	D	L	GF	GA	GD	Pts
7	Hapoel Nazareth Illit	33	12	14	7	38	24	+14	29
8	Hapoel Rishon LeZion	33	13	7	13	39	31	+8	26
9	Ahva Arraba	33	12	9	12	37	37	0	23
10	Maccabi Herzliya	33	10	12	11	31	28	+3	22

Source: Israel Football Association
Rules for classification: 1st points; 2nd goal difference; 3rd matches won; 4th goals scored; 5th head-to-head; 6th decision match.

==== Middle Playoff results ====
Home \ Away	AHV	HNI	HRL	MHE
Ahva Arraba			0–1	2–2
Hapoel Nazareth Illit	2–0			0–0
Hapoel Rishon LeZion		1–2		
Maccabi Herzliya			1–2	

Source: Israel Football Association
Legend: Blue = home team win; Yellow = draw; Red = away team win.

=== Bottom Playoff ===
The points obtained during the regular season were halved (and rounded up) before the start of the playoff. Thus, Hapoel Bnei Lod started with 20 points, Hakoah Ramat Gan with 19, Maccabi Be'er Sheva with 18, Beitar Shimshon Tel Aviv with 17, Hapoel Jerusalem with 12 and Hapoel Marmorek started with 7.

==== Bottom Playoff table ====
Pos	Team	Pld	W	D	L	GF	GA	GD	Pts	Qualification or relegation
11	Hakoah Amidar Ramat Gan	35	11	14	10	44	42	+2	28	
12	Beitar Shimshon Tel Aviv	35	10	13	12	31	47	−16	27	
13	Hapoel Bnei Lod	35	10	15	10	37	34	+3	26	
14	Maccabi Be'er Sheva (O)	35	12	6	17	42	53	−11	24	Qualification for relegation play-offs
15	Hapoel Jerusalem (R)	35	6	11	18	40	66	−26	18	Relegation to Liga Alef
16	Hapoel Marmorek (R)	35	2	9	24	21	72	−51	8	Relegation to Liga Alef

Source: Israel Football Association
Rules for classification: 1st points; 2nd goal difference; 3rd matches won; 4th goals scored; 5th head-to-head; 6th decision match.
(O) Play-off winners; (R) Relegated

==== Bottom Playoff results ====
Home \ Away	BTA	HAR	HBL	HJE	HMK	MBS
Beitar Shimshon Tel Aviv		0–4		1–0		
Hakoah Amidar Ramat Gan				0–0	1–0	1–1
Hapoel Bnei Lod	0–0	2–2			3–0	
Hapoel Jerusalem			2–1			1–1
Hapoel Marmorek	0–1			2–2		
Maccabi Be'er Sheva	1–2		0–0		2–0	

Source: Israel Football Association
Legend: Blue = home team win; Yellow = draw; Red = away team win.

== Promotion/relegation playoff ==
=== Promotion playoff ===
The 3rd-placed team Hapoel Kfar Saba faced the 14th-placed Israeli Premier League team Hapoel Ramat Gan. The winner Hapoel Ramat Gan earned a spot in the 2010–11 Israeli Premier League. The match took place on 22 May 2010.

22 May 2010
18:45 UTC+3

Hapoel Ramat Gan	1–0	Hapoel Kfar Saba
Hermon 84'	Report (in Hebrew)

Haberfeld Stadium, Rishon LeZion
Attendance: 4,000
Referee: Eitan Tabrizi

=== Relegation playoff ===
The 14th-placed team Maccabi Be'er Sheva faced the Liga Alef promotion playoff winner Maccabi HaShikma Ramat Hen. The winner Maccabi Be'er Sheva earned a spot in the 2010–11 Liga Leumit. The match took place on 31 May 2010.

31 May 2010
15:30 UTC+3

Maccabi Be'er Sheva	2–0	Maccabi HaShikma Ramat Hen
Barda 74', 90+5'	Report (in Hebrew)

Haberfeld Stadium, Rishon LeZion
Attendance: 350
Referee: Shay Sheetrit

== Season statistics ==
=== Scoring ===
- First goal of the season: Ofir Azu for Maccabi Be'er Sheva against Hapoel Kfar Saba, 6th minute (21 August 2009)
- Widest winning margin: 5 goals –
  - Ironi Ramat HaSharon 5–0 Hapoel Marmorek (21 August 2009)
  - Maccabi Be'er Sheva 5–0 Hapoel Jerusalem (25 September 2009)
  - Hapoel Ashkelon 6–1 Hapoel Jerusalem (29 January 2010)
  - Hapoel Ashkelon 5–0 Beitar Shimshon Tel Aviv (3 April 2010)
  - Sektzia Nes Tziona 5–0 Hapoel Ashkelon (14 May 2010)
- Most goals in a match: 7 goals –
  - Hapoel Ashkelon 6–1 Hapoel Jerusalem (29 January 2010)
  - Hapoel Kfar Saba 5–2 Ironi Bat Yam (16 April 2010)
  - Ironi Bat Yam 4–3 Sektzia Nes Tziona (23 April 2010)

=== Discipline ===
- First yellow card of the season: Oren Nisim for Ironi Ramat HaSharon against Hakoah Ramat Gan, 33rd minute (21 August 2009)
- First red card of the season: Aimé Lavie for Hakoah Ramat Gan against Ironi Ramat HaSharon, 90th minute (21 August 2009)

=== Miscellaneous ===
- First drawn match: Maccabi Herzliya 0–0 Sektzia Nes Tziona (22 August 2009)
- First goalless match: Maccabi Herzliya 0–0 Sektzia Nes Tziona (22 August 2009)

== Top scorers ==
Rank	Scorer	Club	Goals
1	(Georgia (country)) Akaki Mikuchadze	Ironi Bat Yam	18
2	(Israel) Shay Aharon	Hapoel Jerusalem	17
3	(Israel) Shlomi Azulay	Hapoel Kfar Saba	15
3	(Israel) Tomer Swisa	Ironi Kiryat Shmona	15
5	(Georgia (country)) Gaga Chkhetiani	Ironi Ramat HaSharon / Sektzia Nes Tziona	14
6	(Israel) Yehiel Tzagai	Hapoel Ashkelon	13
7	(Israel) Liron Diamant	Hakoah Ramat Gan	12
8	(Israel) Ido Exbard	Beitar Shimshon Tel Aviv	11
8	(Israel) Wiyam Amashe	Ironi Kiryat Shmona	11
10	(Israel) Ronen Schwartzman	Ahva Arraba	9
10	(Israel) Mohamad Kial	Hapoel Bnei Lod	9
10	(Israel) Meir Asor	Ironi Bat Yam	9
10	(Israel) Eran Zeger	Maccabi Be'er Sheva	9
Total			652
Average per game			2.36

== See also ==
- 2009–10 Israel State Cup
- 2009–10 Toto Cup Leumit
- List of 2009–10 Israeli football summer transfers
- List of 2009–10 Israeli football winter transfers
