= Revivo =

Revivo or Rebibo may refer to:

== People ==
Revivo, the surname of many people:

=== Association footballers ===
- Daniel Revivo, current Canadian forward with Richmond Kickers
- David Revivo, former F.C. Ashdod captain and Israeli international
- Haim Revivo (born 1972), Israeli former international footballer
- Roy Revivo (born 2003), Israeli footballer, son of Haim
- Shay Revivo, current Israeli midfielder with F.C. Ashdod
- Yonatan Revivo, current Israeli midfielder contracted to Bnei Yehuda

=== Musicians ===
- Aaron Revivo, former band member of In Theory

=== Other ===
- Janice Rebibo, Boston-born Israeli poet
- David Rebibo, Orthodox Jewish congregational rabbi
