= Roy Revivo =

Israeli footballer (born 2003)

Personal information
- Date of birth: 22 May 2003 (age 23)
- Place of birth: Tel Aviv, Israel
- Height: 1.85 m (6 ft 1 in)
- Position: Left-back

Team information
- Current team: Elche
- Number: 3

Youth career
- 2011–2022: Maccabi Tel Aviv

Senior career*
Years	Team	Apps	(Gls)
2021–2026	Maccabi Tel Aviv	87	(7)
2023–2023	→ Hapoel Jerusalem	16	(0)
2026–	Elche	4	(0)

International career^{‡}
2021–2022	Israel U19	20	(1)
2023	Israel U20	6	(0)
2023	Israel U21	6	(0)
2023–	Israel	22	(1)
Medal record
Representing Israel U-19
UEFA European Under-19 Championship
Runner-up	2022 Slovakia	Team
Representing Israel U-20
FIFA U-20 World Cup
Third place	2023 Argentina	Team
- * Club domestic league appearances and goals as of 18 September 2026 ‡ National team caps and goals as of 20:25, 27 September 2026 (UTC)

Roy Revivo (Hebrew: רוי רביבו; born 22 May 2003) is an Israeli professional footballer who plays as a left-back for Spanish La Liga club Elche and the Israel national team.

== Early life ==
Revivo was born and raised in Tel Aviv, Israel, to an Israeli family of both Sephardi Jewish and Mizrahi Jewish (Moroccan-Jewish) descent. His father is a well-known former Israel international footballer Haim Revivo, and his mother is Israeli jewellery designer Sagit Revivo. His uncles David Revivo, Shay Revivo, and Eli Revivo are former Israeli footballers as well, and their cousin is Israeli footballer Amir Lavi.

== Club career ==
=== Maccabi Tel Aviv ===
Revivo started his career with Israeli Premier League club Maccabi Tel Aviv. On 22 August 2021 he made his debut in the 1–1 draw against Hapoel Jerusalem in the Toto Cup (of Ligat HaAl) competition.

=== Loan to Hapoel Jerusalem ===
On 2 January 2023, he was loaned to Hapoel Jerusalem. Two weeks later he made his debut in a 2–1 away loss to Maccabi Haifa at Sammy Ofer Stadium.

=== Return to Maccabi Tel Aviv ===
He returned to Maccabi Tel Aviv in July 2023, he then became a recurring XI starter.

=== Elche ===
Revivo has signed a four-year contract with Spanish La Liga side Elche on 1 September 2026.

He made his debut about a week later, in a 3–2 home loss to Real Sociedad in the fourth round of the league, when he came on as a substitute. On 12 September 2026, he started for the first time in Elche's lineup in the away game in the league against Athletic Bilbao, which ended in a 1–1 tie.

On 18 September 2026, he recorded two assists in the league's 3–1 away win over Espanyol, a match that started with an early red card for his team.

== International career ==
Revivo made his debut for the senior Israel national team in 2023.

=== 2024 Summer Olympics ===
Revivo was selected in Israel under-23 squad to compete in the men's football tournament at the 2024 Summer Olympics.

== Career statistics ==
As of match played 27 September 2026

Appearances and goals by national team and year
National team	Year	Apps	Goals
Israel	2023	5	0
Israel	2024	3	0
Israel	2025	10	1
Israel	2026	4	0
Total		22	1

Scores and results list Israel's goal tally first, score column indicates score after each Revivo goal.

List of international goals scored by Roy Revivo
No.	Date	Venue	Opponent	Score	Result	Competition
1	16 November 2025	Zimbru Stadium, Chișinău, Moldova	Moldova	2–1	4–1	2026 FIFA World Cup qualification

=== Club ===
As of 11 May 2024

Club	Season	League			State Cup		Toto Cup		Continental		Other		Total	
Club	Season	Division	Apps	Goals	Apps	Goals	Apps	Goals	Apps	Goals	Apps	Goals	Apps	Goals
Maccabi Tel Aviv	2021–22	Israeli Premier League	0	0	0	0	1	0	–		0	0	1	0
Maccabi Tel Aviv	2022–23	Israeli Premier League	0	0	0	0	1	0	–		0	0	1	0
Maccabi Tel Aviv	2023–24	Israeli Premier League	27	2	1	0	1	0	14	0	0	0	43	2
Maccabi Tel Aviv	Total		27	2	1	0	3	0	14	0	0	0	45	2
Hapoel Jerusalem	2022–23	Israeli Premier League	16	0	0	0	0	0	–		0	0	16	0
Hapoel Jerusalem	Total		16	0	0	0	0	0	0	0	0	0	16	0
Career total			43	2	1	0	3	0	14	0	0	0	61	2

== See also ==
- List of Jewish footballers
- List of Jews in sports
- List of Israelis
