= Eli Abarbanel =

Israeli footballer

Eli Abarbanel אלי אברבנל
Personal information
- Full name: Eliezer Abarbanel
- Date of birth: 22 February 1976 (age 50)
- Place of birth: Petah Tikva, Israel
- Height: 5 ft 9 in (1.75 m)
- Position: Defender

Youth career
- Hapoel Petah Tikva

Senior career*
Years	Team	Apps	(Gls)
1993–2001	Hapoel Petah Tikva	203	(44)
2001–2002	Hapoel Haifa	30	(7)
2002–2009	Bnei Yehuda Tel Aviv	159	(14)
2009	Hapoel Petah Tikva	8	(0)

International career
1998	Israel	2	(0)
- * Club domestic league appearances and goals

Eli Abarbanel (Hebrew: אלי אברבנל; born 22 February 1976) is a retired Israeli footballer.
