= Rami Duani =

Israeli footballer

Rami Duani רמי דואני
Personal information
- Full name: Rami Duani
- Date of birth: May 24, 1987 (age 39)
- Place of birth: Hadera, Israel
- Height: 1.89 m (6 ft 2 in)
- Position: Central defender

Youth career
- 1993–2001: Maccabi Hadera
- 2001–2006: Hapoel Tel Aviv

Senior career*
Years	Team	Apps	(Gls)
2006–2011	Hapoel Tel Aviv	35	(2)
2008–2009	→ Hapoel Kfar Saba (loan)	10	(1)
2010	→ Maccabi Ahi Nazareth (loan)	2	(0)
2011–2012	Hapoel Petah Tikva	1	(0)

International career
2003–2004	Israel U17	13	(1)
2005	Israel U18	7	(2)
2005–2006	Israel U19	20	(3)
2007–2008	Israel U21	9	(0)
- * Club domestic league appearances and goals

Rami Duani
Medal record

Representing Israel

Football

Maccabiah Games
Gold medal – first place	2005 Maccabiah	Football

Rami Duani (Hebrew: רמי דואני; born May 24, 1987) is a former Israeli footballer.
