= Maoz Samia =

Israeli footballer

Maoz Samia מעוז סמייה
Personal information
- Full name: Oz Maoz Samia
- Date of birth: 14 December 1987 (age 38)
- Place of birth: Ramla, Israel
- Height: 1.85 m (6 ft 1 in)
- Position: Central defender

Youth career
- 1998–2004: Ironi Ramla
- 2004–2006: Hapoel Petah Tikva

Senior career*
Years	Team	Apps	(Gls)
2006–2007	Hapoel Petah Tikva	21	(0)
2007–2009	Maccabi Netanya	3	(1)
2009	→ Hapoel Kfar Saba	12	(1)
2010–2011	Beitar Shimshon Tel Aviv	37	(3)
2011–2012	Sektzia Ness Ziona	15	(0)
2012–2014	Hapoel Jerusalem	40	(5)
2014–2015	Beitar Tel Aviv Ramla	18	(2)
2015–2017	Hapoel Jerusalem	66	(1)
2017–2019	Hapoel Bnei Lod	67	(6)
2019–2020	Hapoel Ramat HaSharon	27	(1)
2020–2021	Hapoel Marmorek	5	(0)
Total		311	(20)
- * Club domestic league appearances and goals as of 1 August 2020

Maoz Samia (also transliterated Maoz Samya, Hebrew: מעוז סמייה; born 14 December 1987) is a retired Israeli footballer who played for Hapoel Marmorek.

== Personal life ==
Samia is Jewish, he grew up in Ramla.

== Club career ==
Samia joined Ironi Ramla's youth set up at the age of 9. He quickly moved up the club's ranks, becoming a regular in Ramla's senior squad at the age of 16.

In 2004, Underwriter In Hapoel Petah Tikva.

=== Retirement ===
In January 2021, Samia announced his retirement from football at the age of 33.
