= Haim Pontramoli =

Israeli footballer

Haim Pontramoli חיים פונטרמולי
Personal information
- Full name: Haim Pontramoli
- Date of birth: 9 August 1981 (age 45)
- Place of birth: Israel
- Height: 1.75 m (5 ft 9 in)
- Position: Left back

Team information
- Current team: Beitar Jaffa

Senior career*
Years	Team	Apps	(Gls)
2002–2003	Hapoel Oranit		
2003–2004	Hapoel Ramat Gan		
2004–2005	Hapoel Tzafririm Holon		
2005–2006	Maccabi HaShikma Ramat Hen		
2006–2007	Hapoel Be'er Sheva	24	(1)
2007–2009	Hakoah Ramat Gan	54	(2)
2009–2010	Hapoel Ra'anana	13	(0)
2010–2012	Sektzia Ness Ziona	49	(0)
2012–2013	Hapoel Azor	27	(1)
2013–2014	Maccabi Kiryat Gat	22	(0)
2014–2015	Hapoel Hod HaSharon	24	(0)
2015–2016	Beitar Kfar Saba	19	(0)
2016–2019	F.C. Holon Yermiyahu	86	(3)
2019–2020	F.C. Ironi Or Yehuda	22	(0)
2020–2021	F.C. Holon Yermiyahu	5	(0)
2021–2023	Hapoel Kiryat Ono	47	(1)
2023–2024	Tel Aviv Tommy	22	(1)
2024–2025	Agudat Sport Holon	19	(2)
2025–	Beitar Jaffa	3	(0)
- * Club domestic league appearances and goals as of 1 October 2025

–

Haim Pontramoli (Hebrew: חיים פונטרמולי; born 9 August 1981) is an Israeli association footballer who plays for Beitar Jaffa. He previously played for Hapoel Be'er Sheva, Hakoah Ramat Gan and Hapoel Ra'anana.
