= Ohad Cohen =

Israeli footballer

Ohad Cohen אוהד כהן
Personal information
- Date of birth: June 10, 1975 (age 51)
- Place of birth: Petah Tikva, Israel
- Height: 1.92 m (6 ft 4 in)
- Position: Goalkeeper

Youth career
- Maccabi Petah Tikva

Senior career*
Years	Team	Apps	(Gls)
1994–1995	Maccabi Petah Tikva	–	(–)
1995–1996	Hapoel Mahane Yehuda	30	(0)
1996–1999	Maccabi Petah Tikva	5	(0)
1999–2000	Hapoel Beit She'an	30	(0)
2000–2001	Beitar Jerusalem	35	(0)
2001–2004	Hapoel Petah Tikva	130	(0)
2004–2005	Hapoel Kfar Saba	30	(–)
2005–2010	Maccabi Petah Tikva	132	(0)
2010	Hapoel Haifa	15	(0)
2010–2011	Hapoel Beer Sheva	29	(0)
2011–2012	Hapoel Rishon LeZion	23	(0)
2012–2013	Hapoel Ra'anana	36	(0)
2013–2016	Hapoel Kfar Saba	101	(0)
- * Club domestic league appearances and goals

Ohad Cohen (Hebrew: אוהד כהן; born 10 June 1975) is an Israeli former footballer who played in the goalkeeper position for Hapoel Kfar Saba.
