= Ronnie Gafney =

Israeli footballer

Ronnie Gafney רוני גפני
Personal information
- Date of birth: March 11, 1980 (age 46)
- Place of birth: United States
- Position: Left back

Youth career
- 1997–1998: Maccabi Tel Aviv

Senior career*
Years	Team	Apps	(Gls)
1998–2000	Maccabi Tel Aviv	13	(0)
2000–2001	Hapoel Petah Tikva	10	(0)
2001–2006	Bnei Yehuda	145	(4)
2006–2007	Beitar Jerusalem	19	(0)
2007–2009	Maccabi Haifa	4	(0)
2009–2011	Maccabi Tel Aviv F.C.	43	(0)

International career^{‡}
2006	Israel	2	(0)
- * Club domestic league appearances and goals as of 15 May 2010 ‡ National team caps and goals as of 01:18, 18 June 2007 (UTC)

Ronnie Gafney (Hebrew: רוני גפני; born March 11, 1980) is a former footballer. Born in the United States, he played for the Israel national team.

== Career and life ==
Though born in the United States, his family moved back to Israel in 1988 where he started to play organized football. His developmental years were spent at Maccabi Tel Aviv, where he made his professional debut during the 1998–99 season in a match against Hapoel Tzafririm Holon. Though he could not break the first team on a regular basis as Dedi Ben Dayan was just coming into his own, so Gafni headed to Hapoel Petah Tikva where he languished on the bench. His move to Bnei Yehuda gave him playing time, and he even scored a game-winning goal in the 2002–03 season against his future club Beitar Jerusalem. Eventually he was recognized as being one of the best left backs in all of Israel at that time. He was rewarded with an appearance at the end of the Avraham Grant send off game versus Denmark.

== Honours ==
- Israeli Premier League (2):
  - 2006-07
  - 2008-09
