= Mor Dahan =

Israeli footballer

Mor Dahan מור דהן
Personal information
- Full name: Mor Dahan
- Date of birth: March 19, 1989 (age 37)
- Place of birth: Beersheba, Israel
- Height: 1.89 m (6 ft 2 in)
- Position: Center back

Youth career
- Hapoel Be'er Sheva
- 2002–2007: Beitar Nes Tubruk
- 2007–2008: Maccabi Haifa

Senior career*
Years	Team	Apps	(Gls)
2008–2010	Maccabi Haifa	5	(0)
2008	→ Ironi Ramat HaSharon (loan)	10	(0)
2009–2010	→ Maccabi Ahi Nazareth (loan)	16	(0)
2010	Hapoel Ashkelon	7	(0)
2011–2012	Maccabi Ironi Bat Yam	21	(4)
2012–2013	Hapoel Hadera	17	(0)
2013	Hapoel Ironi Kiryat Shmona	0	(0)
2013–2014	Hapoel Beit She'an	26	(3)
2014–2015	Hapoel Baqa al-Gharbiyye	28	(0)
2015–2016	F.C. Robi Shapira Haifa	26	(0)
2016–2017	Ihud Bnei Kafr Qara	26	(0)

International career
2007	Israel U-18	3	(0)
2007	Israel U-19	17	(0)
- * Club domestic league appearances and goals

Mor Dahan (Hebrew: מור דהן; born March 19, 1989) is a former Israeli football (soccer) defender. He previously played for Maccabi Haifa, Ironi Ramat HaSharon, and Maccabi Ahi Nazareth.

After playing 3 caps for Israel U-18, Dahan moved to make his first appearance for Israel U-19 against Denmark U-19 in a 5–2 win for Israel in the Milk Cup.

He continued to play as Israel won the Milk Cup at 2007. He also played in the qualifiers to U-19 Euro 2008 and then in the 'elite' stage of the qualifiers, which Israel failed to win.

He made his first appearance as a second-half substitute for Maccabi Haifa in the Israeli Premier League on March 22, 2008, versus Ironi Kiryat Shmona. Dahan made five appearances for the club in the 2007–08 season.
