= Shahar Balilti =

Israeli football forward

Personal information
- Full name: Shahar Balilti
- Date of birth: 20 March 1990 (age 36)
- Place of birth: Petah Tikva, Israel
- Position: Forward

Team information
- Current team: Hapoel Bik'at HaYarden

Senior career*
| Years | Team | Apps | (Gls) |
| 2008–2014 | Hapoel Petah Tikva | 91 | (10) |
| 2010–2011 | → Hakoah Amidar Ramat Gan (loan) | 17 | (4) |
| 2014–2015 | Hapoel Katamon | 30 | (7) |
| 2015–2016 | Maccabi Ironi Kiryat Ata | 28 | (9) |
| 2016–2017 | Hapoel Katamon | 19 | (2) |
| 2017–2018 | Hapoel Bik'at HaYarden | 24 | (13) |
| 2018–2019 | F.C. Kafr Qasim | 20 | (0) |
| 2019– | Hapoel Bik'at HaYarden | 145 | (29) |
| 2025– | → Maccabi Amishav Petah Tikva (loan) | 23 | (6) |
- * Club domestic league appearances and goals as of 1 June 2026

Shahar Balilti (Hebrew: שחר בלילטי; born 20 March 1990) is an Israeli football forward. He currently plays for Hapoel Bik'at HaYarden.
