= Avi Soffer =

Israeli footballer

Avi Soffer אבי סופר
Personal information
- Full name: Avi Soffer
- Date of birth: 29 March 1986 (age 40)
- Place of birth: Pardesiya, Israel
- Height: 1.77 m (5 ft 9 1/2 in)
- Position: Defender

Youth career
- Beitar Nes Tubruk
- Hapoel Tel Aviv

Senior career*
Years	Team	Apps	(Gls)
2004–2005	Hapoel Tel Aviv	1	(0)
2005–2007	Hapoel Ra'anana	0	(0)
2007–2009	Hapoel Ramat Gan	45	(1)
2009–2010	Hapoel Ra'anana	23	(1)
2010–2012	Ironi Nir Ramat HaSharon	52	(0)
2012–2013	Hapoel Kfar Saba	32	(0)
2013–2016	Hapoel Ramat Gan	85	(2)
2020–2022	HaMakhtesh Givatayim	28	(2)

International career
2003–2005	Israel U19	8	(0)
- * Club domestic league appearances and goals

Avi Soffer (Hebrew: אבי סופר; born 29 March 1986) is a former Israeli football player. He currently plays for Hapoel Ramat Gan.
