= Dudi Fadlon =

Israeli footballer

Dudi Fadlon דודי פדלון
Personal information
- Full name: Dudi Fadlon
- Date of birth: September 16, 1976 (age 50)
- Place of birth: Rishon LeZion, Israel
- Position: Left back

Youth career
- Hapoel Tel Aviv

Senior career*
Years	Team	Apps	(Gls)
1998–1999	Hapoel Tzafririm Holon	3	(0)
1999–2003	Hapoel Petah Tikva	11	(0)
2001–2002	→ Hapoel Tzafririm Holon (loan)		
2003–2006	Hapoel Nazareth Illit	67	(0)
2006–2007	Maccabi Netanya	3	(0)
2007–2009	Hapoel Be'er Sheva	54	(1)
2009–2010	Hapoel Acre	26	(1)
2010–2011	Hapoel Ramat Gan	16	(0)
- * Club domestic league appearances and goals as of May 15, 2010

Dudi Fadlon (Hebrew: דודי פדלון; born 16 September 1976) is a retired Israeli footballer.

He was born in Rishon LeZion

== Honours ==
- Liga Leumit:
  - Runner-up (1): 2003-04
