= Sébastien Sansoni =

French footballer (born 1978)

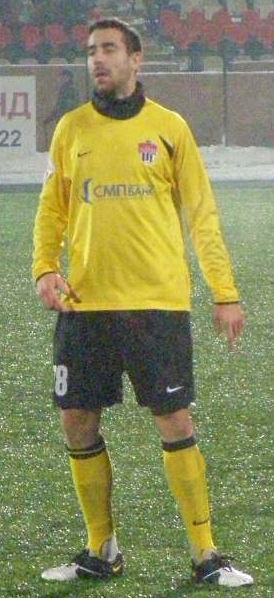

Personal information
- Full name: Sébastien Roger Sansoni
- Date of birth: 30 January 1978 (age 48)
- Place of birth: Marseille, France
- Height: 1.87 m (6 ft 2 in)
- Position: Centre back

Youth career
- Montpellier
- Dijoux
- Paris Saint-Germain

Senior career*
Years	Team	Apps	(Gls)
1999–2000	Neuchâtel Xamax	21	(0)
2000–2001	Marseille Endoume	2	(0)
2001–2002	Martigues	16	(3)
2002–2004	Châteauroux	15	(0)
2004–2006	Ethnikos Asteras	21	(1)
2006–2009	Vitesse	82	(4)
2009–2010	Khimki	8	(0)
2010–2012	Maccabi Petah Tikva	45	(5)
- * Club domestic league appearances and goals

Sébastien Roger Sansoni (born 30 January 1978) is a French former professional footballer.

== Career ==
Sansoni is a defender who was born in Marseille and made his debut in professional football, being part of the Neuchâtel Xamax squad in the 1999–2000 season. He also played for FC Martigues, LB Châteauroux and Ethnikos Asteras before joining Vitesse Arnhem. In the 2006–07 season Sansoni held the Dutch headlines for biting in Roy Beerens' nose during an Eredivisie match between Vitesse and N.E.C., a Gelderland derby.

He signed for Russian Premier League side FC Khimki on 20 August 2009 until the end of the season. When the 2009 season ended he moved to Israel and signed for Maccabi Petah Tikva on 5 January 2010.

On 22 July 2012, after two years with Maccabi Petah Tikva he joined French CFA 2 club Étoile Sportive Pennoise, and continued his career on amateur level.

== International career ==
Alongside Eric Cantona he became World Champion at the 2005 FIFA Beach Soccer World Cup.
