= Eitan Azaria =

Israeli footballer

Eitan Azaria איתן עזריה
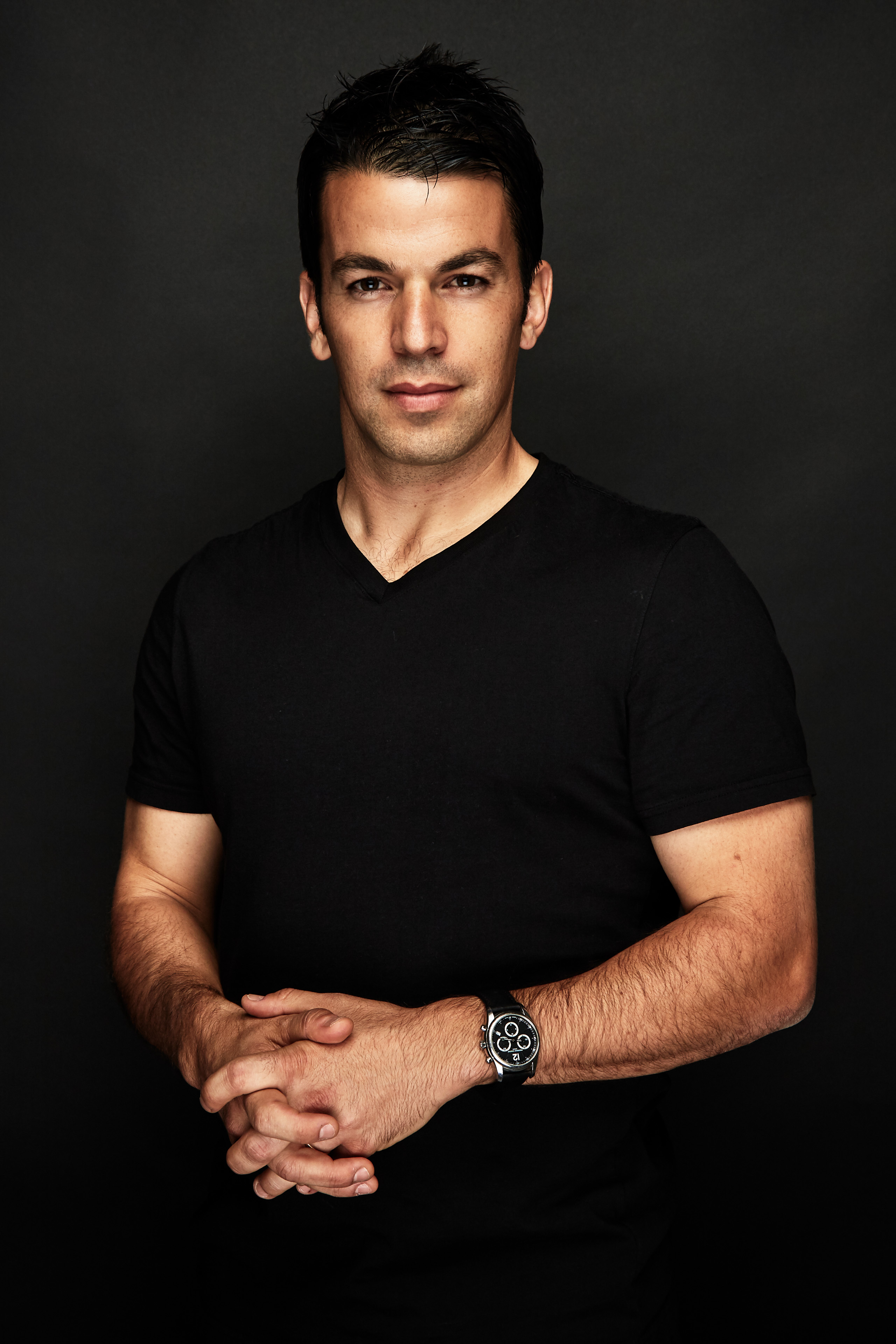

Personal information
- Full name: Eitan Raphael Azaria איתן רפאל עזריה
- Date of birth: May 12, 1983 (age 43)
- Place of birth: Ma'alot-Tarshiha, Israel
- Height: 1.72 m (5 ft 8 in)
- Position: Defender

Youth career
- Maccabi Haifa

Senior career*
Years	Team	Apps	(Gls)
2001–2005	Maccabi Haifa	15	(0)
2002–2003	→ Hapoel Ramat Gan (loan)	-	(-)
2005	Hapoel Haifa	-	(-)
2006–2008	Maccabi Herzliya	48	(2)
2008–2009	Bnei Sakhnin	14	(0)
2009–2010	Hapoel Acre	0	(0)

International career^{‡}
1999–2000	Israel U16	22	(1)
2001	Israel U19	6	(0)
2003–2005	Israel U21	13	(0)
- * Club domestic league appearances and goals as of 26 January 2007 ‡ National team caps and goals as of 21:19, 29 December 2007 (UTC)

Eitan Azaria (Hebrew: איתן עזריה; born May 12, 1983) is an Israeli retired footballer and Football Mental Consultant.

Azaria was a reserve on the Maccabi Haifa Israeli championship teams in 2001 and 2002, coached by Avram Grant. Grant would later go on to use a mental programme developed by Azaria in his coaching.

Azaria converted two penalty kicks in an Israeli Cup penalty shootout against Maccabi Petah-Tikva in 2006. Azaria's side Maccabi Herzliya lost 13–12.
