= Haim Malka =

Israeli footballer

Haim Malka חיים מלכה
Personal information
- Full name: Haim Malka
- Date of birth: 18 February 1980 (age 46)
- Place of birth: Ashkelon, Israel
- Position: Central defender

Youth career
- Hapoel Asheklon

Senior career*
Years	Team	Apps	(Gls)
1999–2005	Hapoel Ashkelon		
2005–2008	Maccabi Herzliya	51	(1)
2008–2009	Hapoel Ra'anana	31	(3)
2009–2010	Hapoel Ramat Gan	11	(0)
2010–2013	Hakoah Amidar Ramat Gan	81	(2)
2013–2014	Hapoel Ashkelon	31	(1)
2014–2016	Maccabi Sha'arayim	65	(3)
- * Club domestic league appearances and goals

Haim Malka (Hebrew: חיים מלכה; born 18 February 1980) is a retired Israeli football center back who plays for Maccabi Sha'arayim.
