= André Caldeira =

Brazilian footballer (born 1980)

Personal information
- Full name: Jefisley André Caldeira
- Date of birth: May 16, 1980 (age 46)
- Place of birth: Brazil
- Height: 1.77 m (5 ft 10 in)
- Positions: Attacking midfielder; left winger

Team information
- Current team: Hapoel Petah Tikva
- Number: 52

Senior career*
Years	Team	Apps	(Gls)
1999–2003	Goiás	9	(0)
2003–2005	Beitar Jerusalem	47	(5)
2005–2007	Maccabi Petah Tikva	48	(2)
2007–2008	Hapoel Be'er Sheva	29	(1)
2008–2009	AEP Paphos	10	(4)
2009	AEL Limassol	11	(0)
2010–2011	Hapoel Ramat Gan	14	(0)
2011	Hapoel Petah Tikva	9	(0)
- * Club domestic league appearances and goals

Jefisley André Caldeira (born May 16, 1980) is a Brazilian midfielder who plays for Hapoel Ramat Gan. Some of his other former teams include Goiás, Beitar Jerusalem, Maccabi Petah Tikva and Hapoel Be'er Sheva. In September 2011, he signed at Hapoel Petah Tikva.
