= Liron Zarko =

Israeli footballer

Liron Zarko לירון זרקו
Personal information
- Full name: Liron Zarko
- Date of birth: 23 January 1981 (age 45)
- Place of birth: Israel
- Height: 1.78 m (5 ft 10 in)
- Position: Defender

Youth career
- Hapoel Petah Tikva

Senior career*
Years	Team	Apps	(Gls)
1999–2003	Hapoel Kfar Saba	43	(2)
2003–2004	Hapoel Petah Tikva	21	(0)
2004–2008	Hapoel Kfar Saba	86	(4)
2008–2009	Hapoel Be'er Sheva	20	(1)
2009	Chongqing Lifan	7	(0)
2010	Bnei Sakhnin	1	(1)
- * Club domestic league appearances and goals

Liron Zarko (Hebrew: לירון זרקו; born 23 January 1981) is an Israeli professional association football player.

== Playing career ==
After one season with Hapoel Be'er Sheva, Zarko signed with Chinese Super League club Chongqing Lifan making him the first Israeli to sign with a club in China.

== Honours ==
=== With Hapoel Kfar Saba ===
- Liga Leumit: 2004–05

=== With Hapoel Be'er Sheva ===
- Toto Cup (Leumit): 2008-09
