= Shay Revivo =

Israeli footballer

Shay Revivo שי רביבו
Personal information
- Full name: Shay Revivo
- Date of birth: December 13, 1986 (age 39)
- Place of birth: Ashdod, Israel
- Height: 1.85 m (6 ft 1 in)
- Position: Midfielder

Senior career*
Years	Team	Apps	(Gls)
2006–2012	F.C. Ashdod	35	(4)
2008–2009	→ Hapoel Ramat Gan (loan)	46	(8)
2011	→ Hapoel Tel Aviv (loan)	2	(0)
2011	→ Hapoel Haifa (loan)	1	(0)
2012–2013	Maccabi Herzliya	24	(6)
2013–2014	Hapoel Petah Tikva	35	(5)
2014–2016	Hapoel Ashkelon	48	(26)
2016–2017	Maccabi Sha'arayim	19	(11)
2018–2019	Hapoel Ashdod	4	(1)
- * Club domestic league appearances and goals

Shay Revivo (Hebrew: שי רביבו; born December 13, 1986, Israel) is an Israeli former footballer.

He is the younger brother of Haim Revivo and David Revivo.
