= Lior Bakshi =

Israeli footballer

Lior Bakshi ליאור בקשי
Personal information
- Full name: Lior Bakshi
- Date of birth: 13 July 1989 (age 37)
- Place of birth: Israel
- Position: Right back

Senior career*
Years	Team	Apps	(Gls)
2008–2010	Hapoel Tel Aviv	3	(0)
2010	→ Hapoel Jerusalem (loan)	9	(0)
2010	Hapoel Ramat Gan	0	(0)
2013	Maccabi Kiryat Malakhi	2	(0)

International career
2007	Israel U18	2	(0)
2007	Israel U19	7	(0)
- * Club domestic league appearances and goals as of 1 June 2015

Lior Bakshi (Hebrew: ליאור בקשי; born 13 July 1989 in Israel) is an Israeli footballer who currently plays for Hapoel Ramat Gan. He previously played for Hapoel Jerusalem on loan from Hapoel Tel Aviv. Bakshi was included in the Hapoel Tel Aviv UEFA cup team for the 08/09 season.
