= Amir Lavi =

Israeli footballer

Amir Lavi אמיר לביא
Personal information
- Full name: Amir Lavi
- Date of birth: June 25, 1988 (age 38)
- Place of birth: Ashdod, Israel
- Position: Attacking midfielder

Team information
- Current team: Hapoel Ironi Ashkelon

Youth career
- F.C. Ashdod

Senior career*
Years	Team	Apps	(Gls)
2006–2014	F.C. Ashdod	50	(3)
2013	→ Hakoah Amidar Ramat Gan (loan)	10	(3)
2015	Hapoel Azor	12	(1)
2015–2016	Bnei Eilat	28	(1)
2016–2018	Hapoel Bnei Ashdod	45	(26)
2018–2019	Hapoel Ashkelon	8	(0)
2019	Maccabi Herzliya	19	(2)
2019–2021	Hapoel Iksal	53	(4)
2021–2022	Hapoel Umm al-Fahm	35	(0)
2022–2023	Hapoel Ra'anana	19	(0)
2023–2024	Ironi Tiberias	18	(0)
2024–2025	Maccabi Kiryat Malakhi	8	(0)
2025–2025	Maccabi Sha'arayim	16	(0)
2025–	Hapoel Ironi Ashkelon	5	(0)
- * Club domestic league appearances and goals as of 30 November 2025

Amir Lavi (Hebrew: אמיר לביא; born 25 June 1988) is an Israeli footballer who plays for Hapoel Ironi Ashkelon.

== Playing career ==
His debut came in a Toto Cup match against Bnei Yehuda on 13 February 2007.
