= Liran Cohen =

Israeli football player (born 1983)

Liran Cohen לירן כהן
Personal information
- Full name: Liran Cohen
- Date of birth: 14 February 1983 (age 43)
- Place of birth: Rishon LeZion, Israel
- Height: 1.74 m (5 ft 8 1/2 in)
- Position: Attacking midfielder

Team information
- Current team: Tel Aviv Tomi
- Number: 15

Youth career
- Maccabi Tel Aviv

Senior career*
Years	Team	Apps	(Gls)
2002–2006	Maccabi Tel Aviv	67	(8)
2006–2009	Maccabi Petah Tikva	61	(3)
2009–2010	Bnei Yehuda	9	(1)
2010–2011	Bnei Sakhnin	42	(5)
2011–2013	Podbeskidzie Bielsko-Biała	35	(3)
2013–2014	Hapoel Haifa	35	(2)
2014–2017	Hapoel Ramat Gan	72	(5)
2017–2018	Hapoel Ramat HaSharon	10	(0)
2018–2019	Hapoel Kfar Shalem	42	(2)
2019	Hapoel Kiryat Ono	9	(0)
2019–2020	Shimshon Tel Aviv	12	(0)
2021	Hapoel Kiryat Ono	7	(0)
2021–2022	A.S. HaMakhtesh Giv'atayim	22	(8)
2022–	Tel Aviv Tomi	45	(8)

International career
2004–2005	Israel U21	11	(1)
- * Club domestic league appearances and goals as of 14 February 2024

Liran Cohen (Hebrew: לירן כהן; born 14 February 1983 in Rishon LeZion) is an Israeli footballer who plays as an attacking midfielder for A.S. HaMakhtesh Giv'atayim.

== Career ==
=== Club ===
He previously played for Maccabi Tel Aviv, Maccabi Petah Tikva and Bnei Yehuda.

A former key player for Maccabi Tel Aviv, and despite his lack of experience in Europe he has scored several important goals for Maccabi in their last campaigns in the UEFA Cup and in the UEFA Champions League.

In August 2011, he was loaned to Podbeskidzie Bielsko-Biała on a half-year deal.

In January 2013, Cohen signed for Hapoel Haifa.

=== International ===
At international level, Cohen was capped for the Israel national under-21 team.

== Honours ==
Maccabi Tel Aviv

- Israel State Cup: 2004–05

Hapoel Haifa

- Toto Cup: 2012–13
