= Shavit Elimelech =

Israeli footballer

Shavit Elimelech שביט אלימלך
Personal information
- Full name: Shavit Elimelech
- Date of birth: 7 September 1971 (age 55)
- Place of birth: Tel Aviv, Israel
- Position: Goalkeeper

Team information
- Current team: Hapoel Haifa

Senior career*
Years	Team	Apps	(Gls)
1988–1992	Maccabi Tel Aviv	1	(0)
1992–1996	Ironi Rishon leZion	135	(1)
1996–2007	Hapoel Tel Aviv	395	(0)
2007–2008	Ironi Kiryat Shmona	25	(0)
2008–2009	Hapoel Petah Tikva F.C.	26	(0)

International career
1999–2004	Israel	14	(0)

Managerial career
- 2009: Hapoel Petah Tikva
- 2009–2010: Hapoel Petah Tikva (assistant)
- 2010–2011: Hapoel Haifa (assistant)
- 2012: Hapoel Tel Aviv (assistant)
- * Club domestic league appearances and goals

Shavit Elimelech (Hebrew: שביט אלימלך; born 7 September 1971) is a retired Israeli football goalkeeper.

He started playing in the Maccabi Tel Aviv Youth League. His first game took place in 1988–89 in a game between Maccabi Tel Aviv FC and Hapoel Jerusalem. From 1988 to 1992 he played for Maccabi Tel Aviv's first team. In 1992, he transferred to Ironi Rishon LeZion and reached the final of the State Cup with this team in 1995–96.

At the end of the 1996 season, Elimelech moved to Hapoel Tel Aviv. With Hapoel Tel Aviv, he won three National Cups in (1999, 2000, 2006), one Championship in (2000) and one Toto Cup in (2002). During these seasons, Elimelech was acknowledged for his impressive one-on-one goalkeeping abilities and his success in stopping penalty kicks (both the 1999 and 2000 cups were obtained after penalty-shoot-outs, in which Elimelech stopped several opponent shots).

Hapoel also reached the quarter-final of the UEFA Cup while Elimelech was in goal displaying impressive reflexes and shot stopping abilities. His most memorable performance during that season was in the 1–1 draw against Chelsea in London, a result which was enough for Hapoel to qualify to the next round, after winning the first match in Tel Aviv 2–0.

In April 2007, Elimelech spoke out against the management at Hapoel Tel Aviv, where fans considered him a symbol of the club. In retaliation, Hapoel's management opted to suspend the keeper until the end of his contract. Elimelech was eventually released from his contract and he signed with Hapoel Kiryat Shmona.

His first game for the Israel national football team was on 18 January 1999 in a friendly match between Israel and Estonia which Israel won 7–0.
