= Emmanuel Emangoa =

Cameroonian footballer

Personal information
- Full name: Emmanuel Emangoa
- Date of birth: September 6, 1983 (age 43)
- Place of birth: Cameroon
- Position: Defensive midfielder

Team information
- Current team: Hapoel Ashkelon
- Number: 30

Senior career*
Years	Team	Apps	(Gls)
2006–2007	Hapoel Ashkelon	21	(0)
2007–2008	Ironi Kiryat Shmona	32	(2)
2008–2009	Maccabi Ironi Kiryat Ata	28	(1)
2009–2010	Hapoel Acre F.C.	24	(0)
2012–2013	Hapoel Ashkelon	7	(0)
- * Club domestic league appearances and goals

Emmanuel Emangoa (born 16 June 1977) is a retired Cameroonian footballer. He played in the Israeli Premier League for Hapoel Acre F.C. in the 2009–2010 season, and he played in the Liga Leumit for Hapoel Ashkelon F.C. in the 2012–2013 season.
