= Marko Popović (footballer) =

Serbian footballer

Marko Popović Марко Поповић
Personal information
- Full name: Marko Popović
- Date of birth: 25 August 1982 (age 44)
- Place of birth: Svilajnac, SFR Yugoslavia
- Height: 1.76 m (5 ft 9 1/2 in)
- Position: Right-back

Youth career
- Radnički Svilajnac
- Red Star Belgrade

Senior career*
Years	Team	Apps	(Gls)
2001–2003	Red Star Belgrade	0	(0)
2002–2003	→ Jedinstvo Ub (loan)		
2004–2005	Leotar	23	(4)
2005–2009	Maribor	137	(10)
2010	Ashdod	12	(0)
2010	Jagodina	6	(0)
2011–2012	Zrinjski	33	(3)
2012–2013	Radnički Svilajnac		
2013	Sloga Petrovac		
- * Club domestic league appearances and goals

Marko Popović (Serbian Cyrillic: Марко Поповић; born 25 August 1982) is a Serbian retired footballer who played as a defender.

== Career ==
He began his career in the youth teams of the famous Serbian club Red Star Belgrade. Later he played for FK Jedinstvo Ub and FK Leotar. He has been playing for NK Maribor in the Slovenian First League from 2006 until January 2010, when he moved to Israel to play with F.C. Ashdod.

== Honours ==
Maribor

- Slovenian PrvaLiga: 2008–09
