= Davit Dighmelashvili =

Georgian footballer

Personal information
- Date of birth: 18 January 1980 (age 46)
- Place of birth: Tbilisi, Georgia
- Height: 1.82 m (5 ft 11 1/2 in)
- Position: Midfielder

Senior career*
Years	Team	Apps	(Gls)
1997–1999	Samsunspor	0	(0)
1999–2001	WIT Georgia	63	(5)
2001–2002	Siena	2	(0)
2002–2007	WIT Georgia	135	(8)
2007–2010	Dinamo Tbilisi	58	(1)
2010	Hapoel Ra'anana	3	(0)
2010–2012	Torpedo Kutaisi	61	(2)
2012–2013	Chikhura Sachkhere	26	(1)
2013–2014	Sasco Tbilisi	17	(2)

International career
1997	Georgia U17	2	(0)
2000–2001	Georgia U21	12	(1)
- * Club domestic league appearances and goals

Davit Dighmelashvili (Georgian: დავით დიღმელაშვილი; born 18 January 1980) is a retired Georgian football defender.
