= Ori Uzan =

Israeli footballer, manager, and broadcaster

Ori Uzan אורי אוזן
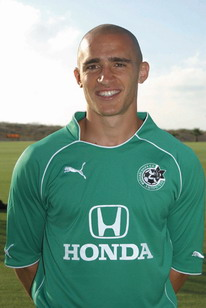
- Uzan in 2005

Personal information
- Full name: Ori Uzan
- Date of birth: December 27, 1978 (age 47)
- Place of birth: Netanya, Israel
- Position: Defender

Team information
- Current team: Beitar Jerusalem (assistant manager)

Youth career
- 1991–1997: Maccabi Netanya

Senior career*
Years	Team	Apps	(Gls)
1997–2004	Maccabi Netanya	179	(8)
2004–2006	Maccabi Haifa	16	(0)
2005–2006	→ Hapoel Petah Tikva (loan)	16	(1)
2006–2007	Maccabi Netanya	32	(1)
2007–2008	Hapoel Kfar Saba	33	(1)
2008–2009	Hapoel Petah Tikva	33	(4)
2009–2010	F.C. Ashdod	10	(0)
2010–2012	Maccabi Petah Tikva	69	(4)

International career^{‡}
2003–2004	Israel	4	(0)

Managerial career
- 2012–2014: Maccabi Haifa (assistant manager)
- 2014–2015: Beitar Jerusalem (assistant manager)
- 2015: Hapoel Petah Tikva (assistant manager)
- 2015-2016: Maccabi Tel Aviv (U-17 team)
- 2016-2018: Maccabi Petah Tikva (youth)
- 2018-: Hapoel Tel Aviv (youth)
- * Club domestic league appearances and goals as of 2 May 2010 ‡ National team caps and goals as of 10 February 2007

Ori Uzan (Hebrew: אורי אוזן; born 27 December 1978) is a former Israeli football player, and currently a football manager and broadcaster.

== Early life ==
Uzan was born in Netanya, Israel, to a Tunisian Jewish family.

== Career ==
He was born in Netanya, started playing in the youth department of Maccabi Netanya and played for several years in the club until he left to Maccabi Haifa at the end of the 2003–04 season.

In his first season, he captured a place in the opening squad but at the second year he was loaned to Hapoel Petah Tikva where he played at the second half of 2005–06 season.

In the summer of 2006 Uzen returned to Maccabi Netanya but left after one season since he had a few problems with his contract. He then signed in Hapoel Kfar Saba for three seasons but played only one season after the team was relegated to Liga Leumit. In July 2008 he moved to Hapoel Petah Tikva for the second time in his career after he played in the team on loan in the 2005–06 season.

He retired in the end of the 2011–12 season after an injury in the spine.

== Career statistics in the Israeli Premier League ==
Season	Club	League			Cups			Europe		
Season	Club		Apps	Goals	Apps	Goals	Apps	Goals	Apps	Goals
1999-00	Maccabi Netanya	Israeli Premier League	27	0	0	0	0	0	27	0
2000-01	Maccabi Netanya	Israeli Premier League	34	1	0	0	0	0	34	1
2001–02	Maccabi Netanya	Israeli Premier League	30	1	4	0	0	0	34	1
2002–03	Maccabi Netanya	Israeli Premier League	32	3	10	2	0	0	42	5
2003–04	Maccabi Netanya	Israeli Premier League	31	3	11	2	0	0	42	5
2004–05	Maccabi Haifa	Israeli Premier League	16	0	5	0	4	0	25	0
2005–06	Hapoel Petach Tikva	Israeli Premier League	16	1	?	?	0	0	16	1
2006-07	Maccabi Netanya	Israeli Premier League	32	1	8	0	0	0	40	0
2007-08	Hapoel Kfar Saba	Israeli Premier League	35	1	3	0	0	0	38	1
2008-09	Hapoel Petach Tikva	Israeli Premier League	33	4	6	0	0	0	39	3
2009-10	F.C. Ashdod	Israeli Premier League	10	0	4	0	0	0	14	0
2009-10	Maccabi Petah Tikva	Israeli Premier League	17	0	3	0	0	0	20	0
2010-11	Maccabi Petah Tikva	Israeli Premier League	26	4	4	0	0	0	30	4
2011-12	Maccabi Petah Tikva	Israeli Premier League	26	0	5	2	0	0	31	2
Career total			365	19	63	6	4	0	432	25

== Honours ==
- Israeli Second Division:
  - Winner (1): 1998-99
- Israeli Premier League:
  - Winner (1): 2004-05
  - Runner-up (1): 2006-07
