= Yehiel Tzagai =

Ethiopian footballer

Yehiel Tzagai יחיאל צגאי
Personal information
- Full name: Yehiel Habatmo Tzagai
- Date of birth: 27 January 1983 (age 43)
- Place of birth: Ethiopia
- Position: Midfielder

Team information
- Current team: Maccabi Sha'arayim F.C.
- Number: 15

Youth career
- Beitar Be'er Sheva

Senior career*
Years	Team	Apps	(Gls)
2001–2002	Beitar Be'er Sheva	12	(2)
2002–2007	Hapoel Be'er Sheva	87	(14)
2003–2004	→ Hakoah Ramat Gan (loan)	17	(2)
2004–2005	→ F.C. Ashdod (loan)	2	(0)
2007–2008	Maccabi Netanya	28	(4)
2008–2009	Bnei Sakhnin	22	(3)
2009–2010	Hapoel Ashkelon	26	(13)
2010–2011	APOP Kinyras Peyias	7	(0)
2011	Hapoel Be'er Sheva	9	(0)
2011–2012	Sektzia Ness Ziona	30	(9)
2012–2015	Hapoel Ashkelon	86	(18)
2015–2016	Maccabi Jaffa	27	(6)
2016	Hapoel Azor	8	(0)
2016	Bnei Jaffa	1	(0)
2016–2017	Hapoel Baqa al-Gharbiyye	14	(2)
2017	Hapoel Beit She'an	8	(1)
2018	Ahva Arraba	12	(6)
2018–2019	Tzeirei Taybe	18	(4)
2019–2025	Bnei Yeechalal Rehovot	95	(48)
2024–2025	→ Maccabi Kiryat Ekron	24	(9)
2025–	Maccabi Sha'arayim	18	(4)
Total		362	(73)
- * Club domestic league appearances and goals as of 1 October 2026

Yehiel Tzagai (Hebrew: יחיאל צגאי; born 27 January 1983) is an Ethiopian footballer.

== Biography ==
Tzagai was born in the Beta Israel community in Ethiopia and his family immigrated to Israel in 1984 during the Operation Moses.

Tzagai grew up through the ranks at Beitar Avraham Be'er Sheva but as the club has collapsed in 2002, he signed at another club in Beersheba - Hapoel Be'er Sheva where he was loaned until 2004 to F.C. Ashdod and Hakoah Ramat Gan.

In 2004 Tzagai returned to Hapoel Be'er Sheva and played there for three seasons in the second league, where he was considered one of the most talented players in the whole league. During the 2006–07 season, Tzagai and two other Be'er Sheva players admitted to receiving bribes to throw a match against Hapoel Ra'anana. However, all three players had refused to throw the match, and later received threats from the people who had attempted to bribe them.

In July 2007 Tzagai signed for Maccabi Netanya and had a very successful debut season with 4 goals and 6 assists, but after some problems with Lothar Matthäus he decided to leave the club and in the end of September 2008 he signed with Bnei Sakhnin.

In September 2009 after one poor season with Sakhnin, Tzagai signed for Hapoel Ashkelon. He scored 13 goals and made 7 assists and was voted as the MVP of the 2009–10 season in Liga Leumit after he was the main reason Ashkelon got promoted to the Israeli Premier League.

On 23 May 2010 it was reported that Tzagai signed a 2-year contract with APOP Kinyras Peyias

He returned to Hapoel Be'er Sheva on 10 January 2011.

In May 2011 he signed a 2 years contract with Sektzia Ness Ziona in the Liga Leumit. The next season, he returned to play for Hapoel Ashkelon, there he played for 3 seasons.

In the 2015–16 season he signed for Maccabi Jaffa in Liga Alef.

== Honours ==
- Liga Leumit:
  - Runner-up (1): 2009–10
  - Player of the Year (2): 2009–10, 2011–12
