= Anderson West =

Nigerian footballer

Personal information
- Full name: Ebimo West Anderson
- Date of birth: 31 August 1989 (age 37)
- Place of birth: Nigeria
- Height: 1.78 m (5 ft 10 in)
- Position: Centre-back

Team information
- Current team: Zwegabin United

Senior career*
Years	Team	Apps	(Gls)
2009	Maccabi Haifa	3	(0)
2009–2010	Maccabi Ahi Nazareth	5	(0)
2011–2012	Maccabi Ironi Bat Yam	30	(0)
2013–2014	Long An	19	(0)
2015–2016	Ayeyawady United	?	(?)
2016–2017	Rakhine United	18	(1)
2018–2019	Zwekapin United	31	(2)
2019	Yangon United	11	(0)
2019–	Zwegabin United	10	(0)
- * Club domestic league appearances and goals as of 8 February 2020

Ebimo West Anderson (born 31 August 1989) is a Nigerian footballer who plays for Zwegabin United.
