= Bryan Gerzicich =

American-Argentine soccer player (born 1984)

Personal information
- Full name: Bryan Paul Gerzicich
- Date of birth: March 20, 1984 (age 42)
- Place of birth: Los Angeles, California, United States
- Height: 5 ft 10 in (1.78 m)
- Position: Midfielder

Senior career*
Years	Team	Apps	(Gls)
2006	Arsenal de Sarandí	3	(0)
2007–2008	Hapoel Haifa	31	(0)
2008–2009	Hapoel Acre	29	(3)
2009–2010	Hapoel Haifa	29	(1)
2010–2013	Hapoel Ironi Kiryat Shmona	96	(2)
2013–2014	Hapoel Tel Aviv	30	(0)
2014–2015	Maccabi Petah Tikva	12	(0)
- * Club domestic league appearances and goals as of June 1, 2014

Bryan Paul Gerzicich (born March 20, 1984) is an American professional soccer player who plays as a midfielder.

== Career ==
Two years after leaving Hapoel Haifa for Hapoel Acre, Gržičić rejoined Haifa.

== Personal life ==
Gerzicich was born in Los Angeles to Argentine parents and raised in Argentina. He holds dual American and Argentine citizenship.
