= Reuven Oved =

Israeli footballer

Reuven Oved ראובן עובד
Personal information
- Date of birth: 28 November 1983 (age 42)
- Place of birth: Giv'at Shmuel, Israel
- Height: 1.73 m (5 ft 8 in)
- Position: Midfielder

Youth career
- Maccabi Tel Aviv

Senior career*
Years	Team	Apps	(Gls)
2001–2004	Maccabi Tel Aviv	47	(4)
2004–2005	Hapoel Haifa	21	(2)
2005–2007	Bnei Yehuda Tel Aviv	55	(5)
2007–2009	Hapoel Tel Aviv	25	(1)
2009	→ Maccabi Netanya (loan)	4	(0)
2009–2010	Bnei Sakhnin	9	(0)
2010	Hapoel Petah Tikva	9	(1)
2010–2011	Ironi Nir Ramat HaSharon	1	(0)
2011	Hakoah Amidar Ramat Gan	14	(1)
2012	Grazer AK	12	(1)
2013–2014	Maccabi Kiryat Gat	24	(1)
2014	Hapoel Mahane Yehuda	1	(0)
2014	F.C. Be'er Sheva	10	(4)
2014	Hapoel Morasha Ramat HaSharon	2	(0)

International career
1998–2000	Israel U16	23	(2)
2001	Israel U19	3	(0)
2002–2003	Israel U21	7	(1)
- * Club domestic league appearances and goals

Reuven Oved (Hebrew: ראובן עובד; born 28 November 1983) is an Israeli former professional footballer who played as a midfielder.

He started his career at Maccabi Tel Aviv but after a few problems with the club he moved to Hapoel Haifa. After one unsuccessful season with Haifa, he moved to Bnei Yehuda Tel Aviv, where he spent two of his most successful seasons in his whole career. In the summer of 2007 he moved to Hapoel Tel Aviv. At the end of 2011 he moved to Grazer AK, but after one season was released from the club in September 2012.

== Honours ==
- Israeli Premier League: 2002–03
- Israel State Cup runner-up: 2006
- Toto Cup (Leumit): 2010
- Austrian Regional League Central: 2011–12
- Liga Alef: 2013–14
