= Cadu (footballer, born 1982) =

Brazilian footballer

Personal information
- Full name: Carlos Eduardo Castro da Silva
- Date of birth: April 23, 1982 (age 44)
- Place of birth: Cuiabá, Brazil
- Height: 1.78 m (5 ft 10 in)
- Position: Striker

Team information
- Current team: Ironi Ramat HaSharon
- Number: 10

Senior career*
Years	Team	Apps	(Gls)
2002–2004	Vasco da Gama	33	(8)
2003	→ Jeonbuk Hyundai Motors (loan)	13	(3)
2004	Germinal Beerschot	26	(9)
2005	Villa Rio		
2005–2008	União Leiria	56	(6)
2008	Hatta Club		
2009–2010	Bnei Sakhnin FC	29	(5)
2010–2011	Olhanense	17	(1)
2012	Ironi Ramat HaSharon	3	(0)
2013	Guarani	10	(1)
2014	CSE	8	([)
2016	Cabofriense	1	(0)
- * Club domestic league appearances and goals

Carlos Eduardo "Cadu" Castro da Silva (born 23 April 1982) is a Brazilian football player who played as striker.

Since he played for South Korean side Jeonbuk Hyundai Motors in 2003, Cadu has played for many foreign clubs including Germinal Beerschot in Belgium, União Leiria in Portugal, Hatta Club in the U.A.E. and Bnei Sakhnin FC in Israel.
