= Emmanuel Mathias =

Nigerian-born Togolese footballer

Personal information
- Date of birth: 3 April 1986 (age 40)
- Place of birth: Kaduna, Nigeria
- Height: 1.83 m (6 ft 0 in)
- Position: Defender

Senior career*
Years	Team	Apps	(Gls)
2000–2003	BCC Lions		
2004–2005	Étoile Filante de Lomé		
2005–2009	Espérance ST	3	(0)
2007–2009	→ EGS Gafsa (loan)		
2009–2011	Hapoel Petach Tikva	30	(0)
2012–2013	Heartland		
2013–2014	Mamelodi Sundowns		
2014–2015	ZESCO United		
2015–2017	Platinum Stars		
2017-2020	Lusaka Dynamos		

International career
2005–2010	Togo	12	(1)
- * Club domestic league appearances and goals

Emmanuel Mathias (born 3 April 1986) is a former professional footballer. Born in Nigeria, he played for the Togo national team.

== Club career ==
In 2004, Mathias transferred to Togolese top club Étoile Filante de Lomé, and received a Togolese passport. On 1 January 2007, was loaned out to El-Gawafel Sportives de Gafsa.

On 22 June 2009, Mathias signed for the Israeli team Hapoel Petach Tikva. He was signed by Heartland F.C. in 2012.

On 9 July 2013, Mathias moved from Heartland to Mamelodi Sundowns in South Africa.

In 2014 he left Mamelodi Sundowns for Zambian Premier League team ZESCO United.

In July 2015, Mathias joined Platinum Stars.

He joined Lusaka Dynamos in January 2017.

== International career ==
On 27 March 2005, Mathias debuted for the Togo national football team against Mali in the 2006 FIFA World Cup qualification. He was a member of the Togo team at the 2006 Africa Cup of Nations in Egypt.
