= Golan Hermon =

Israeli footballer

Personal information
- Full name: Golan Hermon
- Date of birth: 26 September 1977 (age 49)
- Place of birth: Geva Binyamin, West Bank
- Height: 1.87 m (6 ft 1 1/2 in)
- Position: Defender

Youth career
- Beitar Jerusalem

Senior career*
Years	Team	Apps	(Gls)
1996–1997	Beitar Jerusalem	2	(0)
1997–2002	Hapoel Jerusalem	114	(1)
2002–2004	Beitar Jerusalem	30	(0)
2004–2009	Maccabi Netanya	112	(2)
2009–2010	Hapoel Ramat Gan	28	(4)
2010–2012	Hapoel Haifa	53	(1)
2012–2013	Maccabi Umm al-Fahm	10	(0)
2013–2014	Maccabi Yavne	45	(3)
2014–2016	Hapoel Katamon Jerusalem	57	(5)
- * Club domestic league appearances and goals as of 20 July 2014

Golan Hermon (Hebrew: גולן חרמון; born 26 September 1977) was an Israeli footballer (Defender) who currently works as a youth manager at Hapoel Katamon Jerusalem.

== Career ==
Hermon began his career in the youth club of Beitar Jerusalem and flighted to the elder team in 1996. He left after only one season to the city's rival club, Hapoel Jerusalem since he did not get much play in Beitar.

After a few good seasons in Hapoel, Hermon returned to Beitar in 2002, where he stayed for two years. In 2004, Golan moved to Maccabi Netanya, who at the time was playing in the second league and helped promote her to the premier league. In his years at Netanya, the club finished twice in the second place and he participated with the team for the first time in the UEFA Cup. In 5 years with the club he played 149 games and scored 4 goals in all club competitions.

After 5 years with Netanya he left the club in June 2009 to Hapoel Ramat Gan.

On 28 May 2010 he joined Hapoel Haifa for one season. In July 2011 he extended his contract for another season.

After two seasons in Haifa he moved to Maccabi Umm al-Fahm. In October 2012 he had to leave the club after he was assaulted by the chairman of Umm al-Fahm.

On 26 December 2012 he joined Maccabi Yavne.

== Honours ==
- Israeli Premier League:
  - Winner (1): 1996-97
  - Runner-up (2): 2006–07, 2007–08
- Toto Cup (Leumit):
  - Winner (1): 2004-05
