= Joslain Mayebi =

Cameroonian footballer

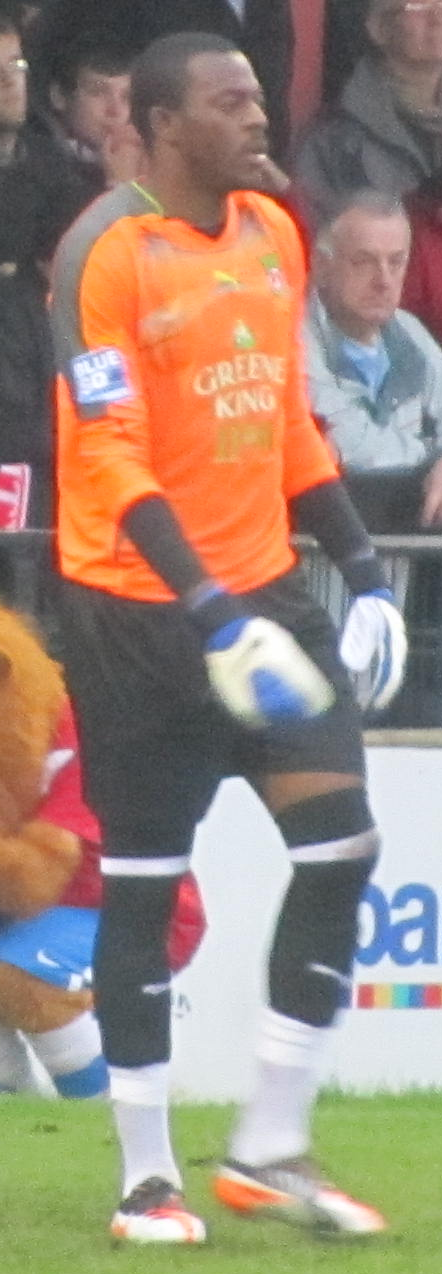
- Mayebi playing for Wrexham in 2011

Personal information
- Full name: Joslain Leon Mayebi
- Date of birth: 14 October 1986 (age 40)
- Place of birth: Douala, Cameroon
- Height: 1.89 m (6 ft 2 in)
- Position: Goalkeeper

Senior career*
Years	Team	Apps	(Gls)
2003–2008	FC Metz B	60	(0)
2008	AEK Larnaca	6	(0)
2008–2010	Hakoah Ramat Gan	18	(0)
2009	→ Beitar Jerusalem (loan)	0	(0)
2010	→ Maccabi Ahi Nazareth (loan)	14	(1)
2011–2014	Wrexham	80	(0)
2014–2015	Kidderminster Harriers	0	(0)
2015–2016	Tvøroyrar Bóltfelag	11	(0)
2016–2017	Royal Eagles	29	(0)
2018	Hereford	0	(0)
- * Club domestic league appearances and goals as of 7 October 2018

Joslain Leon Mayebi (born 14 October 1986) is a Cameroonian footballer who most recently played as a goalkeeper for Hereford.

== Career ==
Mayebi previously played for FC Metz, AEK Larnaca and Hakoah Ramat Gan.

He was selected for the Cameroon national football team at the 2008 Summer Olympics, but did not appear in any matches. He was called into the squad for a 2010 FIFA World Cup qualifier against Togo on 28 March 2009, but did not play.

In late 2010 he spent time on trial with Preston North End and Leicester City.

=== Wrexham ===
He joined Wrexham on trial in December 2010, and, after impressing manager Dean Saunders, joined the club on 1 January 2011 until the end of the 2010–11 season. He made his debut against Luton Town on 30 April 2011. In the 2011–12 season Mayebi made his second appearance against Kidderminster Harriers due to Chris Maxwell being away on Wales under-21 duty, keeping a clean sheet. He went on to replace Maxwell as Wrexham's first choice goalkeeper after conceding only 7 goals in a 16-game run. Maxwell left Wrexham and joined Fleetwood Town due to a lack of first team opportunities.

In July 2012, with Mayebi and youth goalkeeper Louis Gray the only recognised goalkeepers at the club, the announcement of the signing of Andy Coughlin was made to challenge Mayebi for the number one spot during the 2012–13 season. Mayebi began the 2012/13 season relatively well keeping 6 clean sheets in the first 11 games of the season. His play earned him a callup to the Cameroon national football team for a Cup of Nations qualifier. On 29 January 2013 Mayebi picked up a season-ending injury in a 2–2 draw with Southport, the Cameroon international ruptured his Achilles and will be out for approximately 8 months possibly more. This caused Wrexham to re-sign Chris Maxwell on a loan from Fleetwood for the remainder of the season. On 24 March 2013 Mayebi picked up his first honour in football when Wrexham beat Grimsby Town on penalties at Wembley Stadium. Although Mayebi did not play at Wembley due to injury, he picked up a medal after playing in previous rounds against Rushall Olympic, Solihull Moors, Sutton United and Southport.

=== Kidderminster Harriers ===
On 24 November 2014, Joslain signed for Kidderminster Harriers on non-contract terms.

=== Hereford ===
In the summer of 2018 he signed for Hereford. He left again on 4 October 2018.

== Honours ==
- FA Trophy
  - Wrexham 2012/2013
