= Samed Okocha Awudu =

Ghanaian footballer (born 1984)

Personal information
- Full name: Samadu Abdul Awudu
- Date of birth: 15 September 1984 (age 42)
- Place of birth: Ghana
- Height: 1.75 m (5 ft 9 in)
- Position: Striker

Senior career*
Years	Team	Apps	(Gls)
2001–2003	Hearts of Oak	38	(14)
2003–2004	Bregenz	25	(10)
2004–2006	Senec	44	(12)
2006–2010	Maccabi Netanya	90	(21)
2008–2009	→ Bnei Sakhnin (loan)	27	(6)
2010–2011	Hapoel Acre	16	(4)
2011	Hapoel Ramat Gan	10	(0)
2012–2013	Hearts of Oak	17	(12)
2013	Ratchaburi	9	(1)

International career
2000–2001	Ghana U17		
- * Club domestic league appearances and goals as of 15 May 2010

Samadu "Okocha" Abdul Awudu (born 15 September 1984) is a Ghanaian footballer. He played in Ghana for Hearts of Oak, in Austria for SC Bregenz, in Slovakia for FC Senec, in Israel for Maccabi Netanya, Bnei Sakhnin, Hapoel Acre & Hapoel Ramat Gan and in Thailand for Ratchaburi F.C.

== Club career statistics ==
(correct as of June 2011)

Club	Season	League			Cup			Toto Cup			Europe			Total		
Club	Season	Apps	Goals	Assists	Apps	Goals	Assists	Apps	Goals	Assists	Apps	Goals	Assists	Apps	Goals	Assists
Maccabi Netanya	2005–06	15	3	1	0	0	0	5	4	0	0	0	0	20	7	1
Maccabi Netanya	2006–07	31	10	4	1	0	0	6	2	0	0	0	0	38	12	4
Maccabi Netanya	2007–08	29	6	2	0	0	0	4	1	0	2	0	0	35	7	1
Maccabi Netanya	2008–09	2	0	0	0	0	0	2	0	0	0	0	0	4	0	0
Bnei Sakhnin	2008–09	27	6	9	0	0	0	2	1	0	0	0	0	27	6	1
Maccabi Netanya	2009–10	14	2	8	0	0	0	4	0	0	1	0	0	18	2	1
Hapoel Acre	2009–10	13	2	8	0	0	0	0	0	0	0	0	0	13	2	2
Hapoel Acre	2010–11	3	12	10	0	0	0	1	1	0	0	0	0	4	1	0
Hapoel Ramat Gan	2010–11	11	8	1	0	0	0	0	0	0	0	0	9	0	0	

== Honours ==
- Ghana Premier League:
  - Winner (1): 2002
- Israeli Premier League:
  - Runner-up (2): 2006–07, 2007–08
