= Hrvoje Kovačević =

Croatian footballer

Personal information
- Date of birth: 12 July 1982 (age 44)
- Place of birth: Vinkovci, SR Croatia, SFR Yugoslavia
- Height: 1.77 m (5 ft 9 1/2 in)
- Position: Midfielder

Team information
- Current team: Graničar Županja
- Number: 9

Senior career*
Years	Team	Apps	(Gls)
2001–2005	Cibalia	76	(4)
2005–2009	Bnei Yehuda	116	(4)
2009–2010	Hapoel Ramat Gan	11	(1)
2010	Maccabi Herzliya	9	(0)
2010–2011	Istra 1961	21	(0)
2011–2012	Lučko	4	(0)
2012–2013	Graničar Županja		
2013	Rudeš		
2022-	Graničar Županja		

International career^{‡}
2001–2003	Croatia U20	7	(0)
2003	Croatia U21	2	(0)
- * Club domestic league appearances and goals as of 21 October 2011 ‡ National team caps and goals as of 17 May 2011

Hrvoje Kovačević (born 12 July 1982) is a Croatian association football player currently playing for NK Graničar Županja.

== Club career ==
He began his career playing for HNK Cibalia in the Croatian Prva HNL, before signing a contract with Israeli team Bnei Yehuda Tel Aviv in the 2005/2006 season. He later moved to Hapoel Ramat Gan, where he played in 2009.
