= David Revivo =

Israeli footballer

David Revivo דוד רביבו
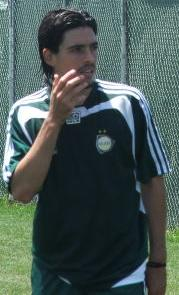

Personal information
- Date of birth: 5 December 1977 (age 48)
- Place of birth: Ashdod, Israel
- Height: 1.76 m (5 ft 9 in)
- Position: Attacking midfielder

Youth career
- 1995–1996: Maccabi Tel Aviv

Senior career*
Years	Team	Apps	(Gls)
1996–2000	Maccabi Tel Aviv	32	(1)
2000–2009	F.C. Ashdod	274	(37)
2009–2011	Hapoel Be'er Sheva	62	(11)
2011–2013	F.C. Ashdod	61	(10)
2013–2014	Beitar Jerusalem	13	(0)
2014	Hapoel Haifa	10	(0)
2014–2016	Maccabi Yavne	56	(8)
2016	Hapoel Bnei Lod	8	(2)
2016–2017	Hapoel Marmorek	12	(2)
2017	Hapoel Bnei Ashdod	0	(0)
2017–2019	Hapoel Ashdod	24	(7)
2019	Ironi Beit Dagan	7	(0)
2019–2022	Ramat Hen	23	(12)

International career
1999	Israel U21	4	(1)
2004–2005	Israel	3	(0)

Managerial career
- 2016–2017: Hapoel Marmorek (assistant manager)
- 2022–2023: Hapoel Ashdod (assistant manager)
- 2023–2024: Hapoel Ashdod
- * Club domestic league appearances and goals

David Revivo (Hebrew: דוד רביבו; born 5 December 1977) is an Israeli former professional footballer who played as an attacking midfielder.

He is the second-greatest goal-assist provider in Israel's history with 104 assists in the Israeli Premier League.

== Career ==
The younger brother of Haim Revivo, he too was recognized early in his youth for having a great footballing potential and joined the youth system of Maccabi Tel Aviv. Later he transferred to his hometown of Ashdod. After six seasons in Ashdod, Revivo finished his contract and went on trial at Los Angeles Galaxy in Major League Soccer. According to media reports in Israel, Revivo impressed manager Steve Sampson but was not offered a contract because Sampson was sacked shortly after Revivo had returned to Israel. Subsequently, Revivo signed a new deal with Ashdod.

In October 2019, Revivo joined Maccabi HaShikma Ramat Hen.

== Honours ==
- Israeli Premier League runner-up: 1998–99
- Toto Cup: 1998–99; runner-up 1997–98, 2001–02, 2004–05, 2005–06, 2008–09
