= HaMerotz LaMillion 4 =

Season of television series

- Season 4
- Presented by: Ron Shahar
- No. of teams: 14
- Winners: Shay Gavriel & Shani Alon
- No. of legs: 13
- Distance traveled: 50,000 km (31,000 mi)
- No. of episodes: 35 (37 including recaps)

Release
- Original network: Channel 2
- Original release: 22 November 2014 – 28 March 2015

Additional information
- Filming dates: 9 May – 2 June 2014

Series chronology
- ← Previous; Season 3 Next → Season 5

HaMerotz LaMillion 4 is the fourth season of HaMerotz LaMillion (Hebrew: המירוץ למיליון, lit. The Race to the Million), an Israeli reality competition show based on the American series The Amazing Race. Hosted by Ron Shahar, it featured fourteen teams of two, each with a pre-existing relationship, in a race around the world to win ₪1,000,000. This season visited four continents and eight countries, traveling approximately 50,000 kilometres (31,000 mi) during thirteen legs. Starting in Jerusalem and the Beit Netofa Valley, racers traveled through Israel, Georgia, Sweden, Finland, England, Costa Rica, Bolivia, and Argentina, before finishing in Buenos Aires and learning the results in Ramat Gan. New elements introduced this season include the split Starting Lines during the first leg. This season premiered on 22 November 2014 on Channel 2 and concluded on 28 March 2015.

Wife and husband's best friend Shani Alon and Shay Gavriel were the winners of this season, while gay best friends Tom Baum and Uriel Yekutiel finished second, and ex-Haredim friends Yochi Apolion and Linor Fahima finished third.

== Production ==
=== Development and filming ===
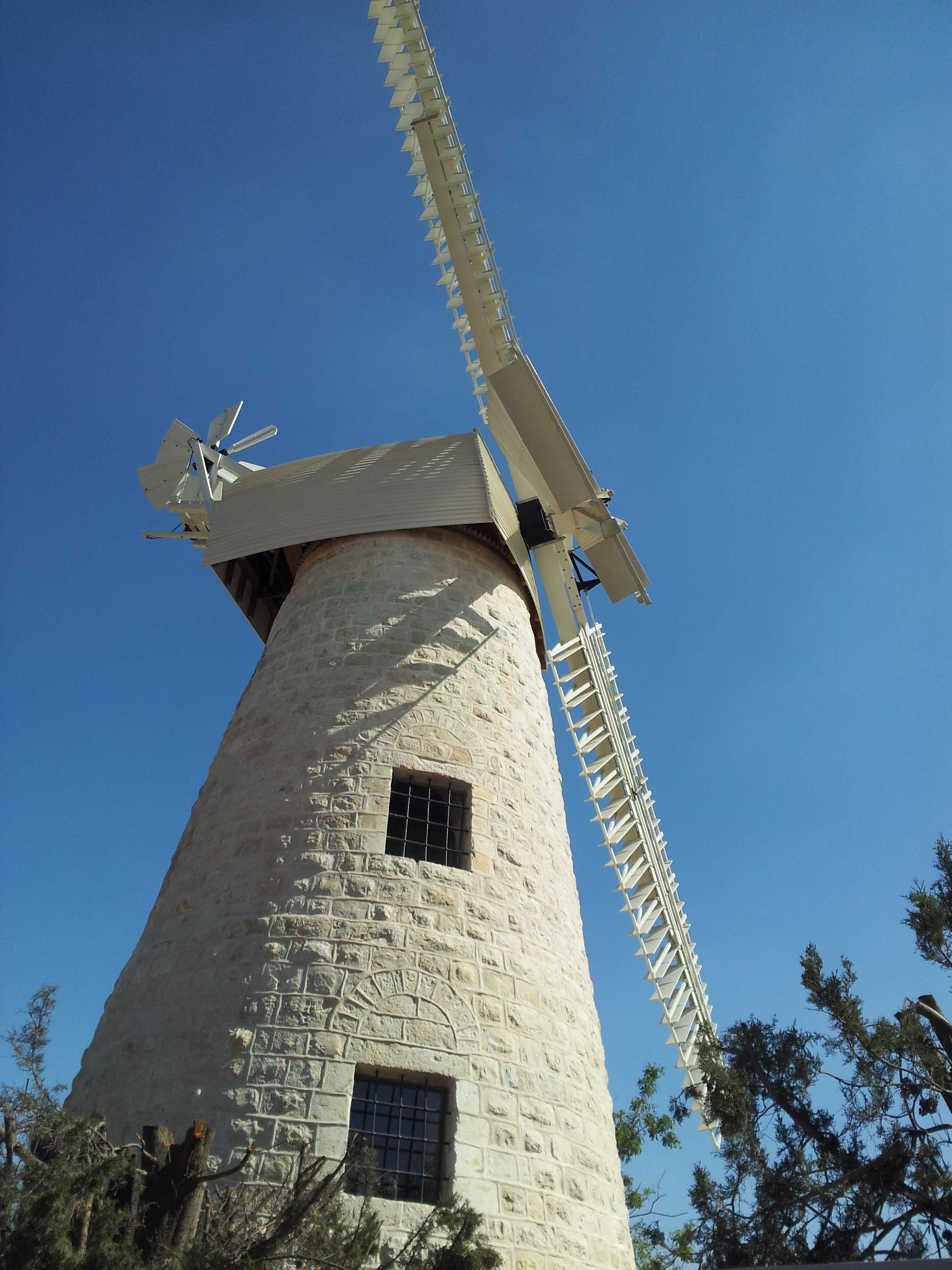
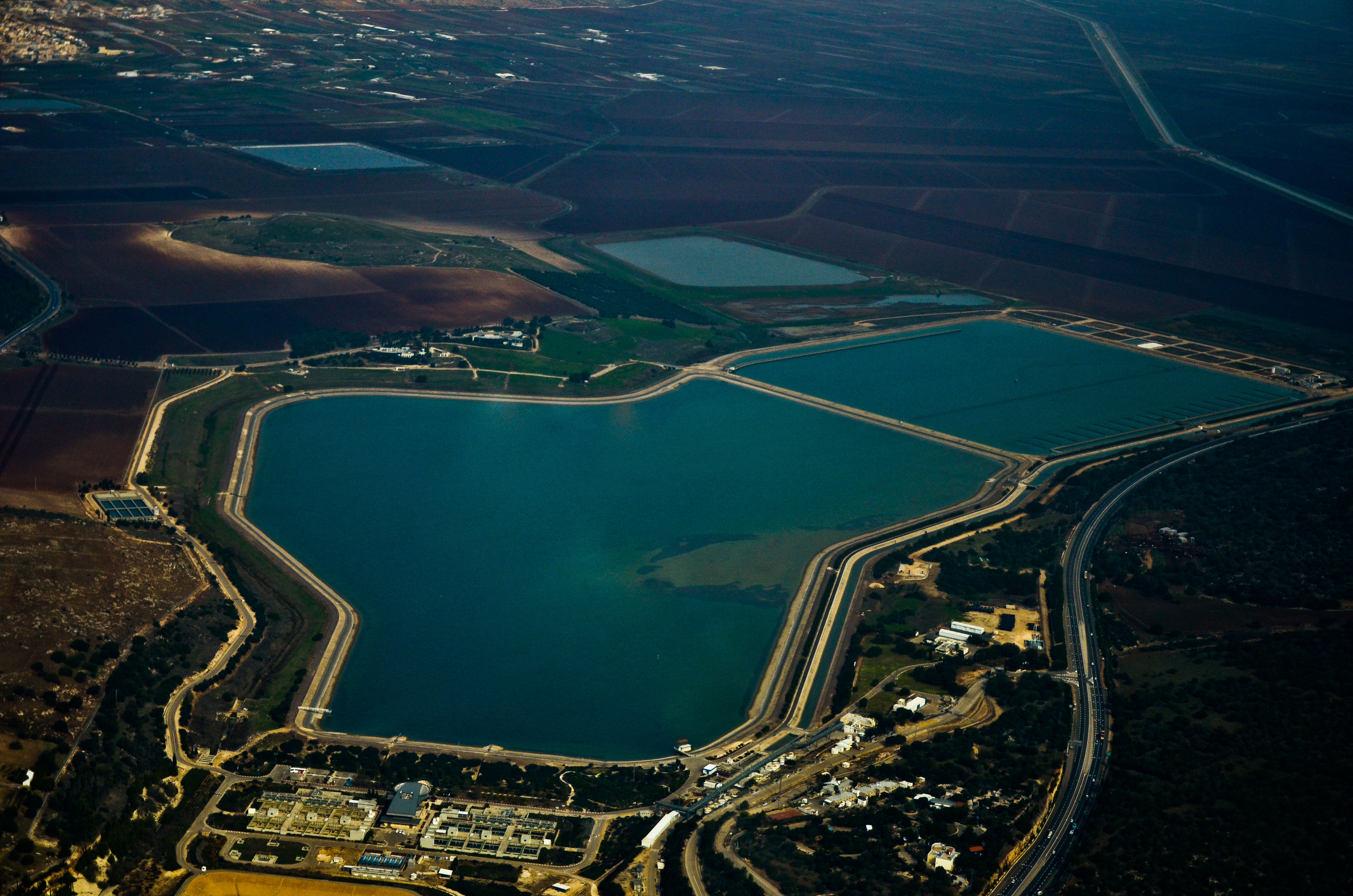
The Montefiore Windmill in Mishkenot Sha'ananim, Jerusalem and the Eshkol Reservoir in Beit Netofa Valley both served as Starting Lines.

The season introduced a new Starting Line twist and contained two different first legs that started in different locations. Each of the legs resulted in the elimination of the last team in Israel. The 14 teams were split into two groups of seven and each of the groups ran in one of the alternative first legs, while being unaware of the existence of the second group.

Filming for this season began on 9 May 2014. On 16 May, teams traveled from Stockholm, Sweden, to Helsinki, Finland, with tasks spotted at Sauna Arla and Kaivopuisto. The next day, teams went to Hämeenlinna. Filming concluded in early June. The season visited four continents and eight countries covering a distance of more than 50,000 kilometres (31,000 miles), including the first time that an Amazing Race franchise visited the nation of Georgia, which hadn't been visited by the original American version at the time but would later be visited on the 28th season in 2016.

The results of the final leg (as well as the overall placement) were determined when teams had checked-in at the Pit Stop mat at Estancia La Republica in Argentina. However, teams had to fly back to Israel and travel to the Moshe Aviv Tower in Ramat Gan to learn the final outcome of the season and the winning team.

== Cast ==
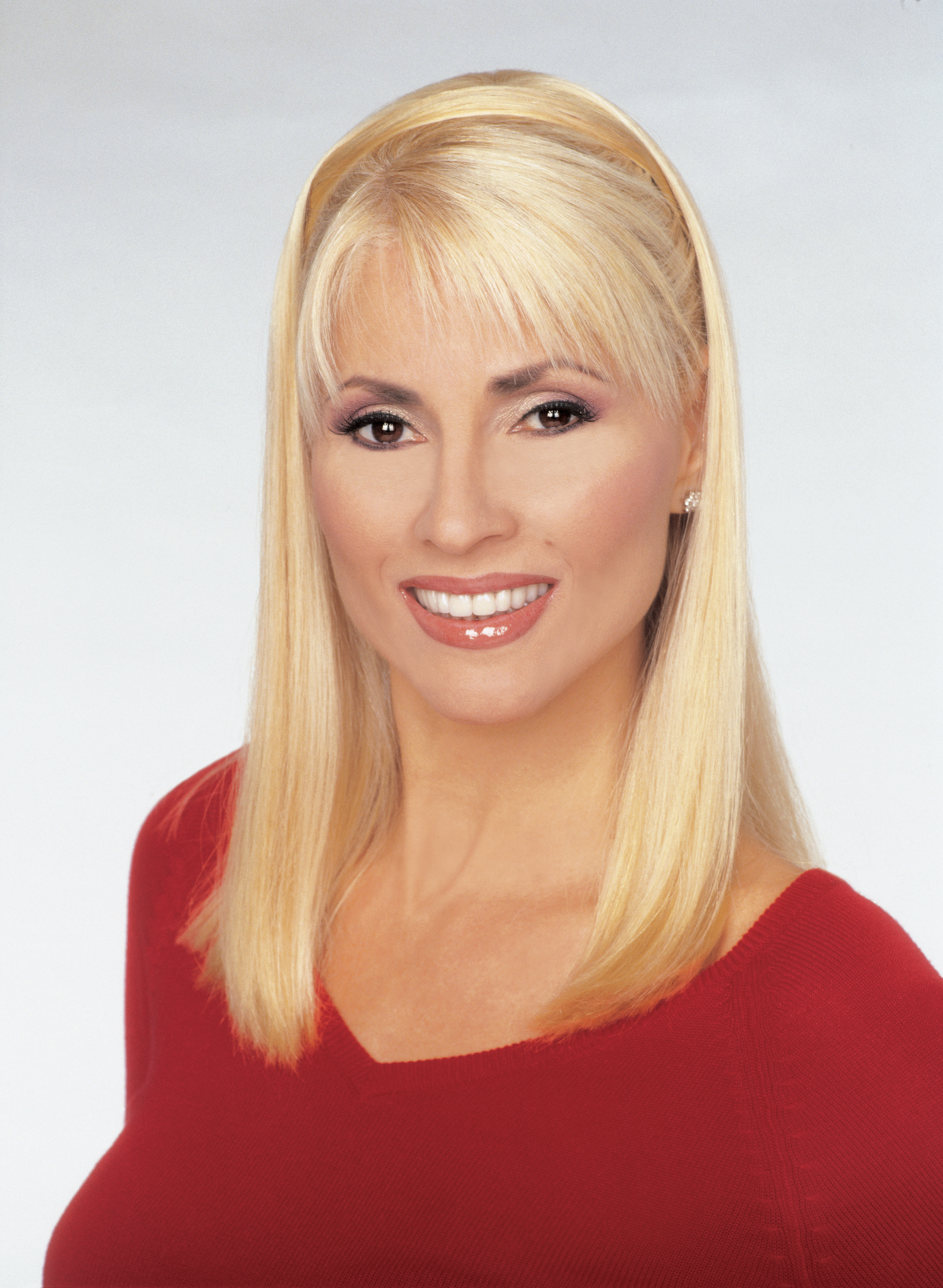
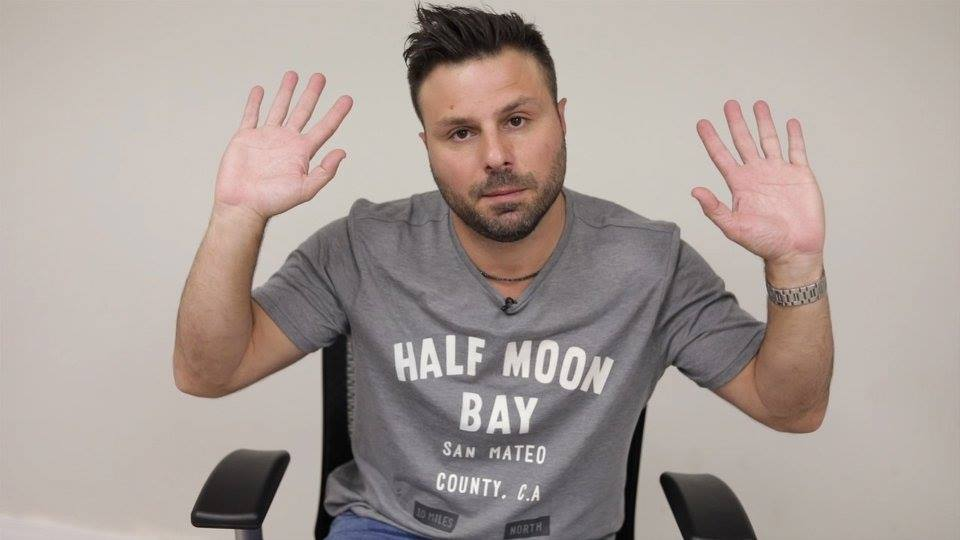
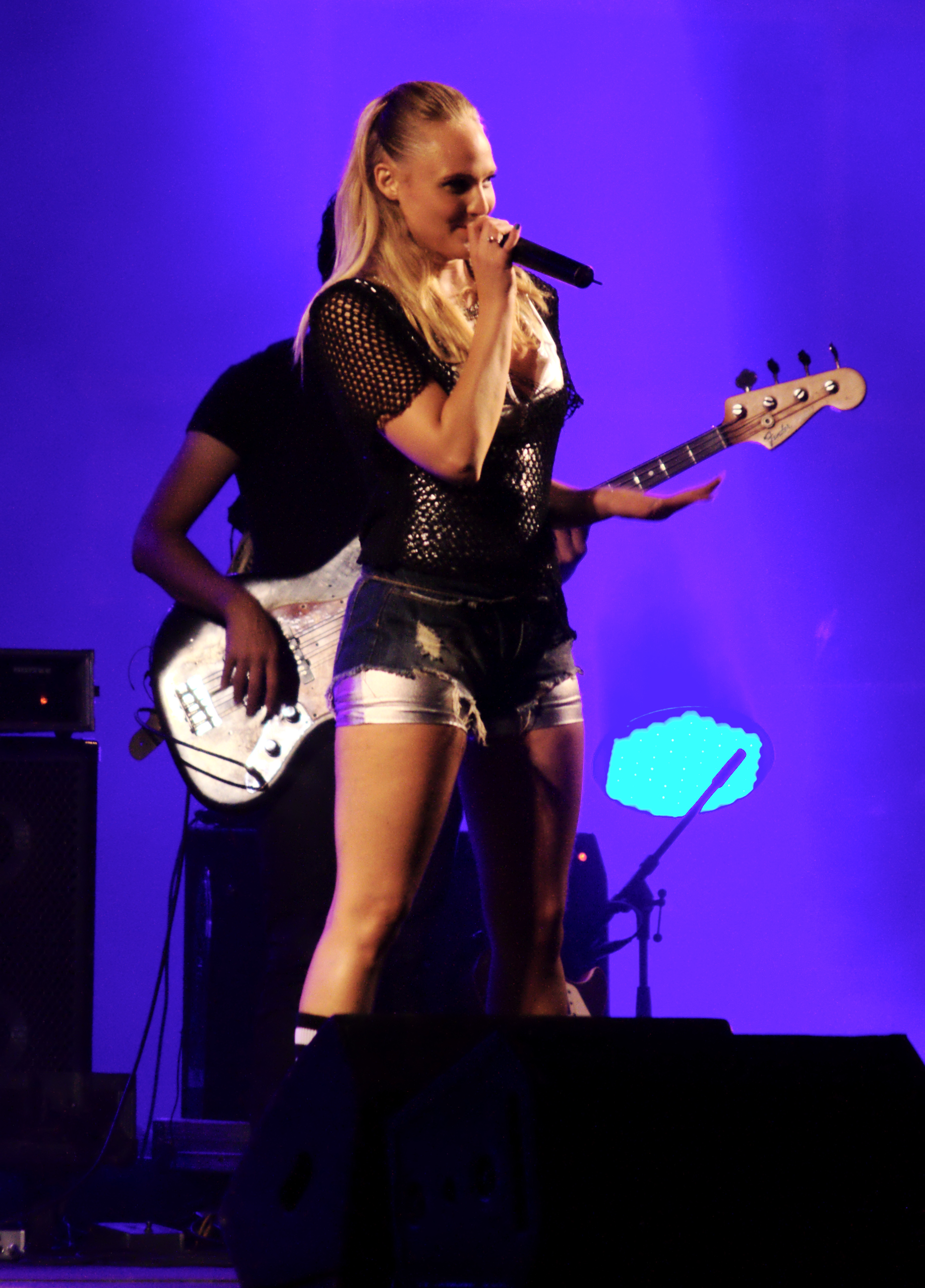
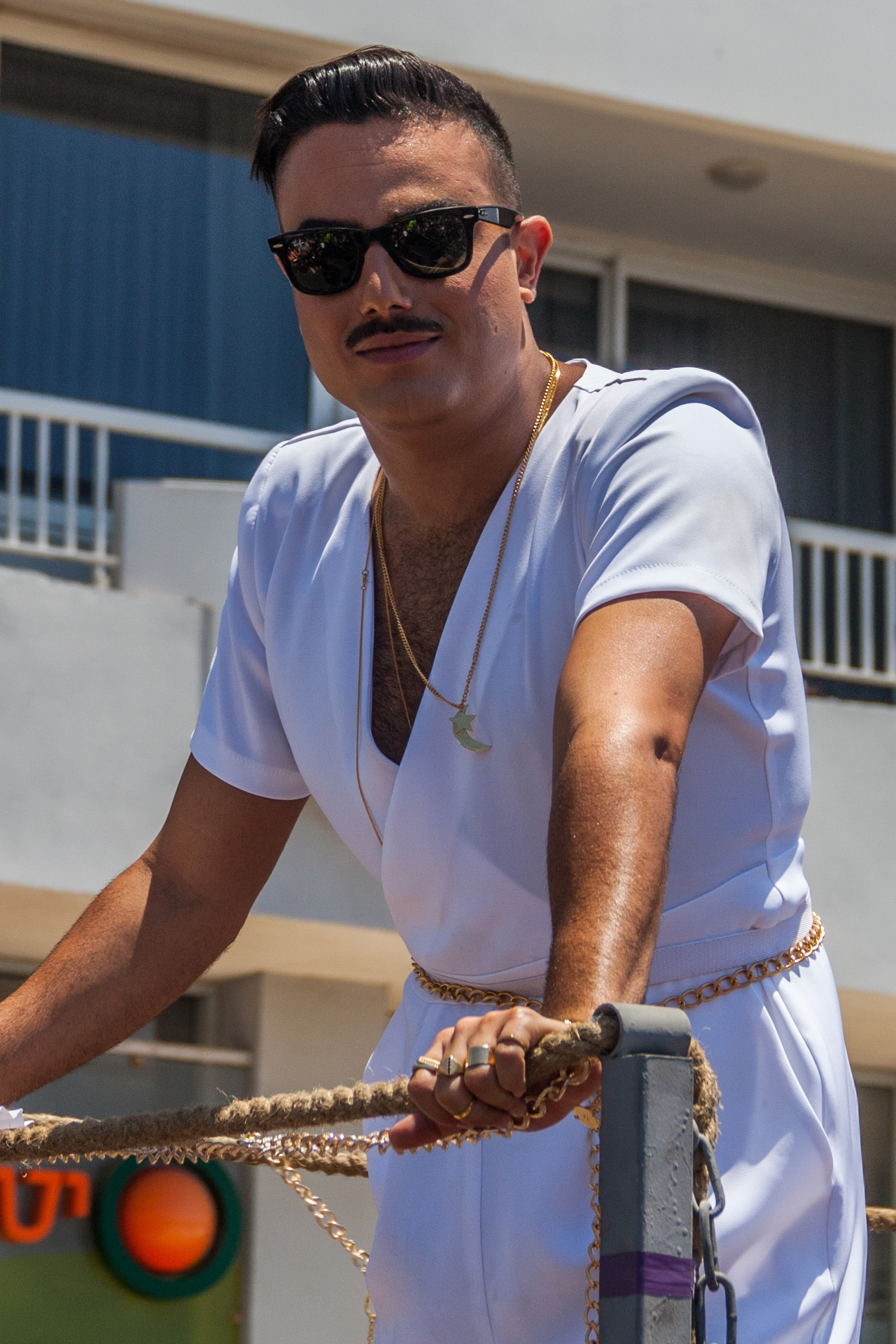
From left to right: Pnina Rosenblum, Liron "Tiltil" Urfali, Roni Duani and Uriel Yekutiel

The cast for this season included politician and businesswomen Pnina Rosenblum, singer Roni Duani and actress Yael Duani, model Alexa Dol, and MTV music editor Tom Baum.

On 8 June 2020, Inbal "Tzuki" Nativ died at the age of 35 after a two year battle with cancer.

Contestants	Age	Relationship	Hometown	Status
Pnina Rosenblum (פנינה)	59	Businesswoman & Daughter	Tel Aviv	Eliminated 1st (in Jerusalem, Israel)
Hen Rosenblum (חן)	21	Businesswoman & Daughter	Tel Aviv	Eliminated 1st (in Jerusalem, Israel)
Hila "Huti" Peretz (חוטי)	29	Cousins	Petah Tikva	Eliminated 2nd (in Petah Tikva, Israel)
Inbal "Tzuki" Nativ (צוקי)	29	Cousins	Petah Tikva	Eliminated 2nd (in Petah Tikva, Israel)
Irit Bahir (אירית)	54	Mother & Daughter	Ein Harod	Eliminated 3rd (in Tbilisi, Georgia)
Sinai Bahir (סיני)	31	Mother & Daughter	Ein Harod	Eliminated 3rd (in Tbilisi, Georgia)
Liron "Tiltil" Urfali (טילטיל)	38	Taxi Driver & Money Changer	Tel Aviv	Eliminated 4th (in Tbilisi, Georgia)
Shay Mizrahi (מזרחי)	37	Taxi Driver & Money Changer	Tel Aviv	Eliminated 4th (in Tbilisi, Georgia)
Yafa Barazany (יפה)	57	Mother & Son	Rosh HaAyin	Eliminated 5th (in Stockholm, Sweden)
Boaz Vaknin (בועז)	27	Mother & Son	Kiryat Ono	Eliminated 5th (in Stockholm, Sweden)
Roni Duani (רוני)	28	Sisters	Tel Aviv	Eliminated 6th (in Hämeenlinna, Finland)
Yael Duani (יעל)	32	Sisters	Tel Aviv	Eliminated 6th (in Hämeenlinna, Finland)
Shay Attoun (שי)	27	Identical Twins	Eilat	Eliminated 7th (in Jacó, Costa Rica)
Adi Attoun (עדי)	27	Identical Twins	Eilat	Eliminated 7th (in Jacó, Costa Rica)
Ruth "Alexa" Dolgakov (אלכסה)	21	Spouses	Tel Aviv	Eliminated 8th (in San José, Costa Rica)
Raz Zelcerman (רז)	29	Spouses	Tel Aviv	Eliminated 8th (in San José, Costa Rica)
Daniel Topaz (דניאל)	25	Business Partners	Tel Aviv	Eliminated 9th (in La Paz, Bolivia)
Meiri Shemesh (מאירי)	24	Business Partners	Jerusalem	Eliminated 9th (in La Paz, Bolivia)
Gal Almog (גל)	26	Engaged	Ashdod	Eliminated 10th (in Huatajata, Bolivia)
Liel Gelstein (ליאל)	26	Engaged	Ashdod	Eliminated 10th (in Huatajata, Bolivia)
Vova Lazarovitch (וובה)	27	New Olim & Exes	Petah Tikva	Eliminated 11th (in Buenos Aires, Argentina)
Alla Aibinder (אלה)	25	New Olim & Exes	Petah Tikva	Eliminated 11th (in Buenos Aires, Argentina)
Yochi Apolion (יוכי)	24	Ex-Haredim Friends	Givatayim	Third Place
Linor Fahima (לינור)	24	Ex-Haredim Friends	Kiryat Ata	Third Place
Tom Baum (טום)	20	Gay Best Friends	Tel Aviv	Second Place
Uriel Yekutiel (אוריאל)	26	Gay Best Friends	Tel Aviv	Second Place
Shay Gavriel (שי)	28	Wife & Husband's Best Friend	Ein Ya'akov	Winners
Shani Alon (שני)	27	Wife & Husband's Best Friend	Ein Ya'akov	Winners

Future appearances

Tom Baum appeared on the third leg of the subsequent season as a clue giver. Shay & Shani and Vova & Alla competed on HaMerotz LaMillion 8.

In mid-2015, Liron "Tiltil" Orfeli competed on the seventh season of the Israeli edition of Survivor and won the season. "Tiltil" then appeared on the ninth season of the Israeli edition of Big Brother along with Season 2 contestant Adel Bespalov and Season 6 contestant Neta Barazani as part of a second wave of houseguests with a secret assignment in order to earn their way into the Big Brother house. "Tiltil" and Neta were unable to earn a spot in the house. Ruth "Alexa Dol" Dolgakov later competed on the ninth season of Survivor with Season 5 contestant Jonathan "Joezi" Zirah. Alexa was the fifth person voted off of the show and finished in 13th place. Alla Aibinder competed on and won the eleventh season of Survivor in 2021. Yochi Apolion competed on the fifteenth season of Big Brother in 2025.

== Results ==
The following teams participated in this season, with their relationships at the time of filming. Note that this table is not necessarily reflective of all content broadcast on television due to inclusion or exclusion of some data. Placements are listed in finishing order:

Team	Position (by leg)														Roadblocks performed
Team	1^{1}		2+^{3}	3	4+^{4}	5	6	⊂7+^{7}⋑	8	9	10	11+	12	13	Roadblocks performed
Shay & Shani	2nd		7th⊃	5th	6th	5th	6th	4th*	4th	5th	5th>	4th	2nd	1st	Shay 4, Shani 3
Tom & Uriel		3rd	3rd	2nd>	7th⊃	3rd>	3rd⊃	1st°	6th>	4th>	1st>	1st	1st	2nd	Tom 4, Uriel 3
Yochi & Linor	4th		4th⊃	6th	5th	9th>	7th⊃	6th*	5th	1st	2nd>	3rd−	3rd	3rd^{8}	Yochi 4, Linor 3
Vova & Alla	1st		9th⊃	7th	9th⊂	8th<	8th⊂	7th~	7th<	6th<	4th>	2nd	4th		Vova 4, Alla 3
Gal & Liel		2nd	8th⊂	4th>	4th⊃	6th>	1st⊃	5th°−^{7}	3rd>	3rd>	3rd<	5th			Gal 4, Liel 3
Daniel & Meiri	5th		1st⊃	3rd	1st	1st	2nd	3rd^	1st>	2nd>	6th				Daniel 3, Meiri 4
Alexa & Raz		5th	2nd	1st>	3rd⊃	2nd>	5th⊃^{6}	2nd^	2nd>	7th					Alexa 2, Raz 4
Shay & Adi		6th	10th	9th>	2nd⊃	7th>	4th⊃	8th~	8th						Shay 3, Adi 2
Roni & Yael		4th	6th	10th>	8th⊃−^{4}	4th>	9th⊃								Roni 2, Yael 1
Yafa & Boaz		1st	5th	8th>	10th^{5}										Yafa 1, Boaz 1
Tiltil & Mizrahi	6th		11th⊃	11th<											Tiltil 1, Mizrahi 1
Irit & Sinai	3rd		12th⊃−^{3}												Irit 1, Sinai 0
Tzuki & Huti		7th													Tzuki 0, Huti 0
Pnina & Hen	7th^{2}														Pnina 0, Hen 0

Key

- A red team placement means the team was eliminated.
- An underlined leg number indicates that there was no mandatory rest period at the Pit Stop and all teams were ordered to continue racing. An underlined team placement indicates that the team came in last and was not eliminated.
- An underlined blue team placement indicates that the team was the last to arrive at a Pit Stop in a non-elimination leg.
- An orange + indicates that there was a Double Battle on this leg, while an orange − indicates the team that lost the Duel and received a 15-minute penalty.
- A brown ⊂ indicates the team who received a U-Turn; ⊃ indicates that the team voted for the recipient; A cyan ⋑ indicates that the team was granted an exclusive U-Turn in a Double U-Turn; ⋐ indicates the team who received it; ⊂ and ⋑ around a leg number indicates that the Double U-Turn was available for that leg but not used.
- A yellow < indicates the team who received a Yield; > indicates that the team voted for the recipient.
- Matching colored symbols (teal ^, magenta °, pink * and olive ~) indicate teams who worked together during part of the leg as a result of an Intersection.

Notes

1. Leg 1 was split into two halves. Seven of the teams completed the first part of the leg in Jerusalem, while the other seven completed the second part in northern Israel. Those who were not eliminated from the first group met up with the second group in Petah Tikva.
2. Pnina fell at the Starting Line and fractured her wrist. She was taken to hospital to get treated, and then she proceeded with Hen directly to the Pit Stop for elimination.
3. Sinai injured her head during the second-last match of the Duel; she and Irit elected to forfeit the remaining match and serve the 15-minute penalty.
4. During the third match of the Duel, Roni became trapped in her kayak and was held underwater for a brief period. Despite sustaining no injuries, she elected to forfeit the task as she was too traumatized to continue the task. All other teams to arrive after them immediately received their next clue without performing the Duel. Yafa & Boaz did not arrive, however because of their situation (see below), Roni & Yael received the 15-minute penalty once all of the other teams had passed them.
5. Yafa & Boaz traveled to the hospital at the beginning of the leg, due to concerns that Boaz had contracted pneumonia. This turned out not to be the case, but by the time he was discharged the other teams had already finished the leg. Thus, Yafa & Boaz were directed to the Pit Stop without performing any of the leg's tasks.
6. Alexa & Raz chose to serve a 1-hour penalty so that only Raz had to complete the log-rolling challenge.
7. Gal collapsed from exhaustion and dehydration after his third straight attempt of the Duel. Unfit to continue, he and Liel forfeit all remaining matches and all other teams to arrive after them were immediately given their next clue without performing the Duel. Gal & Liel received the 15-minute penalty once all of the other teams had passed them, by which point Gal had recovered enough to race.
8. Yochi & Linor were unable to finish the final leg because they were unable to complete the final challenge, thus accepting a third-place finish.

=== Voting history ===
Teams may vote to choose either U-Turn or Yield. The team with the most votes received the U-Turn or Yield penalty, depending on the respective leg.

	U-Turn	Yield	U-Turn	Yield	U-Turn	Double U-Turn	Yield		
Leg #	2	3	4	5	6	7	8	9	10
U-Turned/Yielded	Gal & Liel	Tiltil & Mizrahi	Vova & Alla	Vova & Alla	Vova & Alla	Unaired	Vova & Alla	Vova & Alla	Gal & Liel
Result	6–5–1	6–4–1	5–3–1	6–1–1–1	6–1–1–1	Unaired	4–3–1	3–2–1–1	4–2
Voter	Team's Vote								
Shay & Shani	Gal & Liel	Yafa & Boaz	Yafa & Boaz	Daniel & Meiri	Daniel & Meiri	Unknown	Alexa & Raz	Tom & Uriel	Gal & Liel
Tom & Uriel	Tiltil & Mizrahi	Tiltil & Mizrahi	Vova & Alla	Vova & Alla	Vova & Alla	Unknown	Vova & Alla	Vova & Alla	Gal & Liel
Yochi & Linor	Gal & Liel	Yafa & Boaz	Yafa & Boaz	Vova & Alla	Vova & Alla	Unknown	Alexa & Raz	Alexa & Raz	Gal & Liel
Vova & Alla	Gal & Liel	Yafa & Boaz	Alexa & Raz	Alexa & Raz	Alexa & Raz	Unknown	Alexa & Raz	Tom & Uriel	Gal & Liel
Gal & Liel	Tiltil & Mizrahi	Tiltil & Mizrahi	Vova & Alla	Vova & Alla	Vova & Alla	Unknown	Vova & Alla	Vova & Alla	Vova & Alla
Daniel & Meiri	Gal & Liel	Yafa & Boaz	Yafa & Boaz	Shay & Shani	Shay & Shani	Unknown	Vova & Alla	Vova & Alla	Vova & Alla
Alexa & Raz	Tiltil & Mizrahi	Tiltil & Mizrahi	Vova & Alla	Vova & Alla	Vova & Alla	Unknown	Vova & Alla	Yochi & Linor	
Shay & Adi	Tiltil & Mizrahi	Tiltil & Mizrahi	Vova & Alla	Vova & Alla	Vova & Alla	Unknown	Yochi & Linor		
Roni & Yael	Tiltil & Mizrahi	Tiltil & Mizrahi	Vova & Alla	Vova & Alla	Vova & Alla				
Yafa & Boaz	Vova & Alla	Tiltil & Mizrahi	N/A						
Tiltil & Mizrahi	Gal & Liel	Shay & Adi							
Irit & Sinai	Gal & Liel								

== Episode Titles ==
Translated from Hebrew from the official website:

1. Kickoff Event! (!אירוע ההזנקה) (Leg 1)
2. The New Teams Join (הזוגות החדשים מצטרפים) (Leg 1)
3. Landing in Georgia (נוחתים בגאורגיה) (Leg 2)
4. The Battle for Georgia (הקרב על גרוזיה) (Leg 2)
5. On the Tallest Tower in Georgia (במגדל הכי גבוה בגאורגיה) (Leg 2)
6. The Gold Tooth Mission (משימת שן הזהב) (Leg 3)
7. Silence of the Lambs! (!שתיקת הכבשים) (Leg 3)
8. Leaving Georgia with an Elimination (נפרדים מגרוזיה בהדחה) (Leg 3)
9. Landing in Sweden! (!נוחתים בשוודיה) (Leg 4)
10. The Swedish Delicacy (המעדן השוודי) (Leg 4)
11. Elimination in Sweden (נפרדים משוודיה) (Leg 4)
12. Blazing Finland! (!פינלנד הלוהטת) (Leg 5)
13. Heavy Rock Show! (!מופע רוק כבד) (Leg 5)
14. Christmas in Finland (חג מולד בפינלנד) (Legs 5 & 6)
15. Upside-down Obstacle Course (מסלול מכשולים הפוך) (Leg 6)
16. Celebration in Finland! (!חגיגה בפינלנד) (Leg 6)
17. Surprising Elimination in Finland (הדחה מפתיעה בפינלנד) (Leg 6)
18. Landing in London (נוחתים בלונדון) (Leg 7)
19. Pop Band! (!להקת פופ) (Leg 7)
20. The Race Halts! (!המירוץ עוצר) (Leg 7)
21. Summarizing Europe (מסכמים את אירופה) (Recap)
22. Costa Rica (קוסטה ריקה) (Leg 8)
23. Tropical Warfare (לוחמה טרופית) (Leg 8)
24. Animals of the Forest! (!חיות היער) (Leg 9)
25. Hammock and Harvest (הערסל והקטיף) (Leg 9)
26. Dramatic Elimination! (!הדחה דרמטית) (Leg 9)
27. Conquering Bolivia (כובשים את בוליביה) (Leg 10)
28. Shocking Mission! (!משימה מטלטלת) (Leg 10)
29. Shocking Elimination! (!הדחה מטלטלת) (Leg 10)
30. The Desert in Bolivia! (!המדבר בבוליביה) (Leg 11)
31. Soldiers in Bolivia! (!חיילים בבוליביה) (Leg 11)
32. Who Will Reach the Final (מי יגיע לגמר) (Recap)
33. Semifinals! (!חצי הגמר) (Leg 12)
34. Looking for Mother (מחפשים את אימא) (Leg 12)
35. Semifinals! (!חצי הגמר) (Leg 12)
36. Grand Finale! (!הגמר הגדול) (Leg 13)
37. Reunion (האיחוד) (Recap)

== Race summary ==
Route Map of the Race.

Destinations	Air travel Rail travel Water travel Bus travel Helicopter travel Bicycle travel Gondola travel
Route Markers	צומת (Detour) מחסום (Roadblock) עצור (Yield) מסלול משותף (Intersection) סיבוב פרסה (U-Turn) דו–קרב (Duel) נקודת סיום (Pit Stop)

=== Leg 1 (Israel) ===
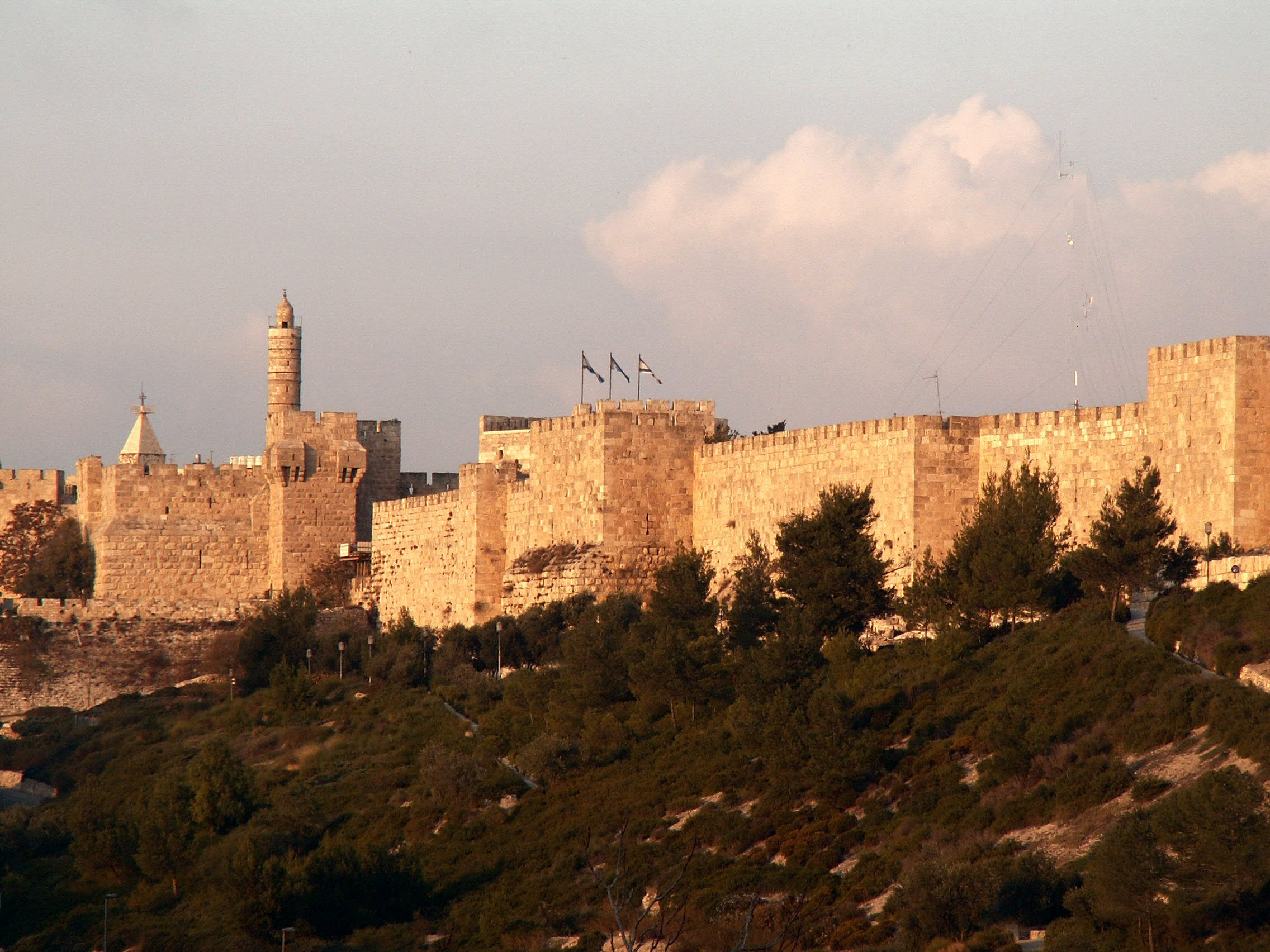
Outside the Walls of Jerusalem, teams had to climb to the top of a ladder.

Group A

- Airdate: 22 November 2014
- Medically removed: Pnina & Hen

Locations

- Jerusalem, Israel (Mishkenot Sha'ananim) (Starting Line)
- Jerusalem (Walls of Jerusalem)
- Jerusalem (Jerusalem Botanical Gardens)
- Jerusalem (City of David)

Episode summary (Episode 1)

- The first group of seven teams began at Mishkenot Sha'ananim and traveled on foot to the Walls of Jerusalem, where they found a series of pole and chains forming a ladder. Teams had to work together to climb 30 metres (98 ft) to reach their next clue, which directed them to the Jerusalem Botanical Gardens.
- This season's first Detour was a choice between Milk (חלב – Halav) or Honey (דבש – Dvash). In Milk, teams had to use two long sticks to move five bottles of milk by the neck into a holding tray without dropping them to receive their next clue. In Honey, teams had to harvest a full jar of honey from honeycomb at an apiary, while wearing mesh cages on their heads that each had a jar of live bees dropped inside, to receive their next clue.
- After the Detour, teams were told to find the city of the "Sweet Singer of Israel" and had to figure out that this referred to the City of David, the Pit Stop for this leg.

Additional note

- After leaving the Starting Line, Pnina fell and fractured her wrist. After treatment at the hospital, she and Hen were brought to the Pit Stop for their elimination.

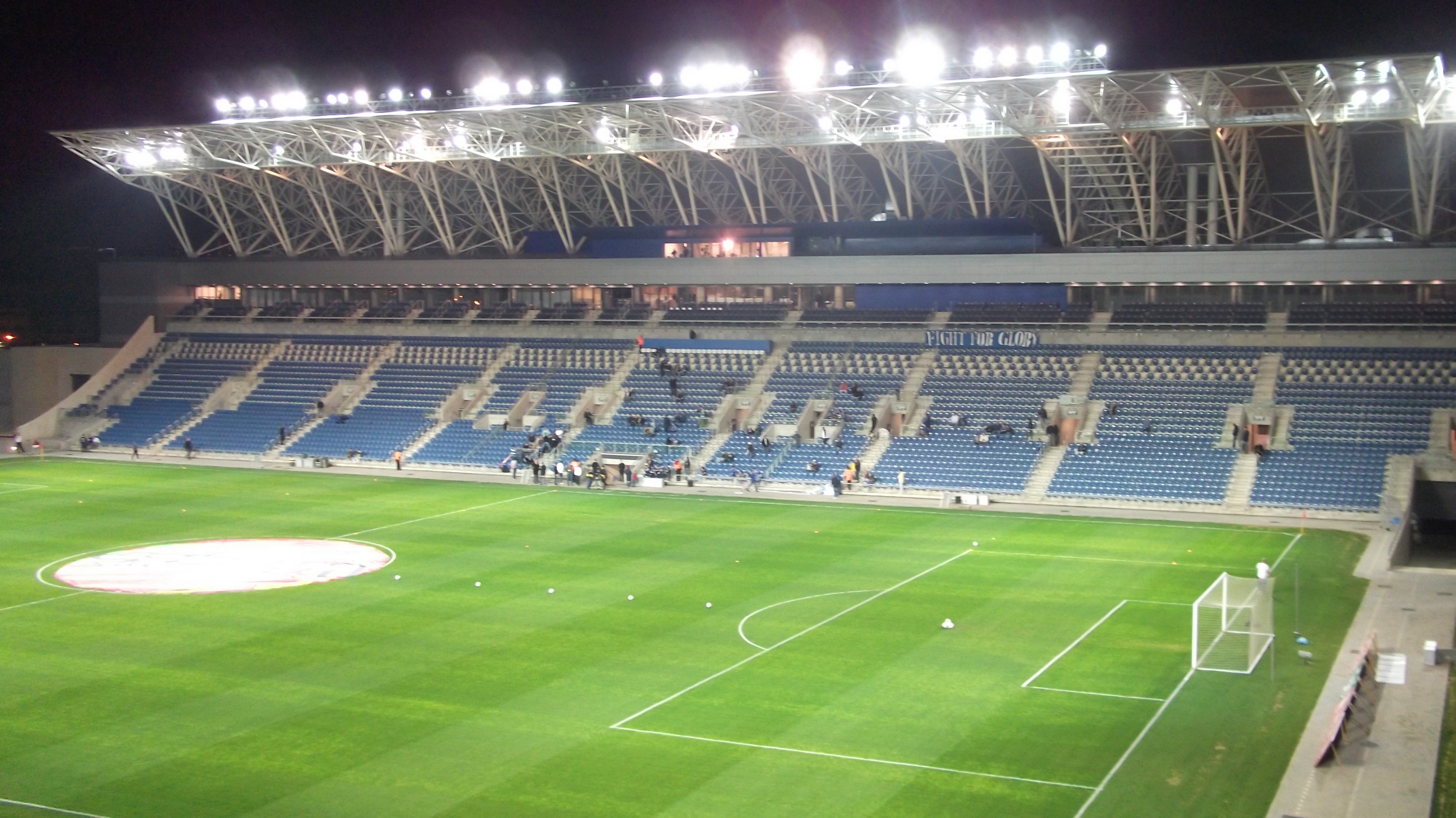
HaMoshava Stadium in Petah Tikva served as the second of two Pit Stops for the first leg and the starting point of a race across the world.

Group B

- Eliminated: Tzuki & Huti
- Airdate: 26 November 2014

Locations

- Beit Netofa Valley, Israel (Eshkol Reservoir) (Starting Line)
- Haifa District (Bat Shlomo)
- Petah Tikva (HaMoshava Stadium)

Episode summary (Episode 2)

- The second group of seven teams began at the Eshkol Reservoir, where they had to paddle a raft, collect nine locked puzzle pieces using a designated key, and assemble a puzzle receive their next clue. Next, teams had to collect water from reservoir by using a hollow tube and blocking the water with their palms, transport the tube into the reservoirs filtering station, and fill two full cups of water to receive their next clue.
- Teams then had to drive to a Bat Shlomo and play an historical memory game. The field contained two sets of balloons connected to sealed envelopes. One set contained pictures of historical events and the other contained a year. Teams had to match one historical event to its correct year and present it to the history teacher to receive their next clue. If teams gave a wrong answer, they had to listen a history lecture about the subject before they could search again.
- After the history task, teams were told to travel to "the area which was formerly been the stables of Malabas" and had to figure out that they were being directed to the HaMoshava Stadium in Petah Tikva, for the Pit Stop.

Additional note

- After the second group of teams checked into the Pit Stop, the first group arrived to begin the race.

=== Leg 2 (Israel → Georgia) ===
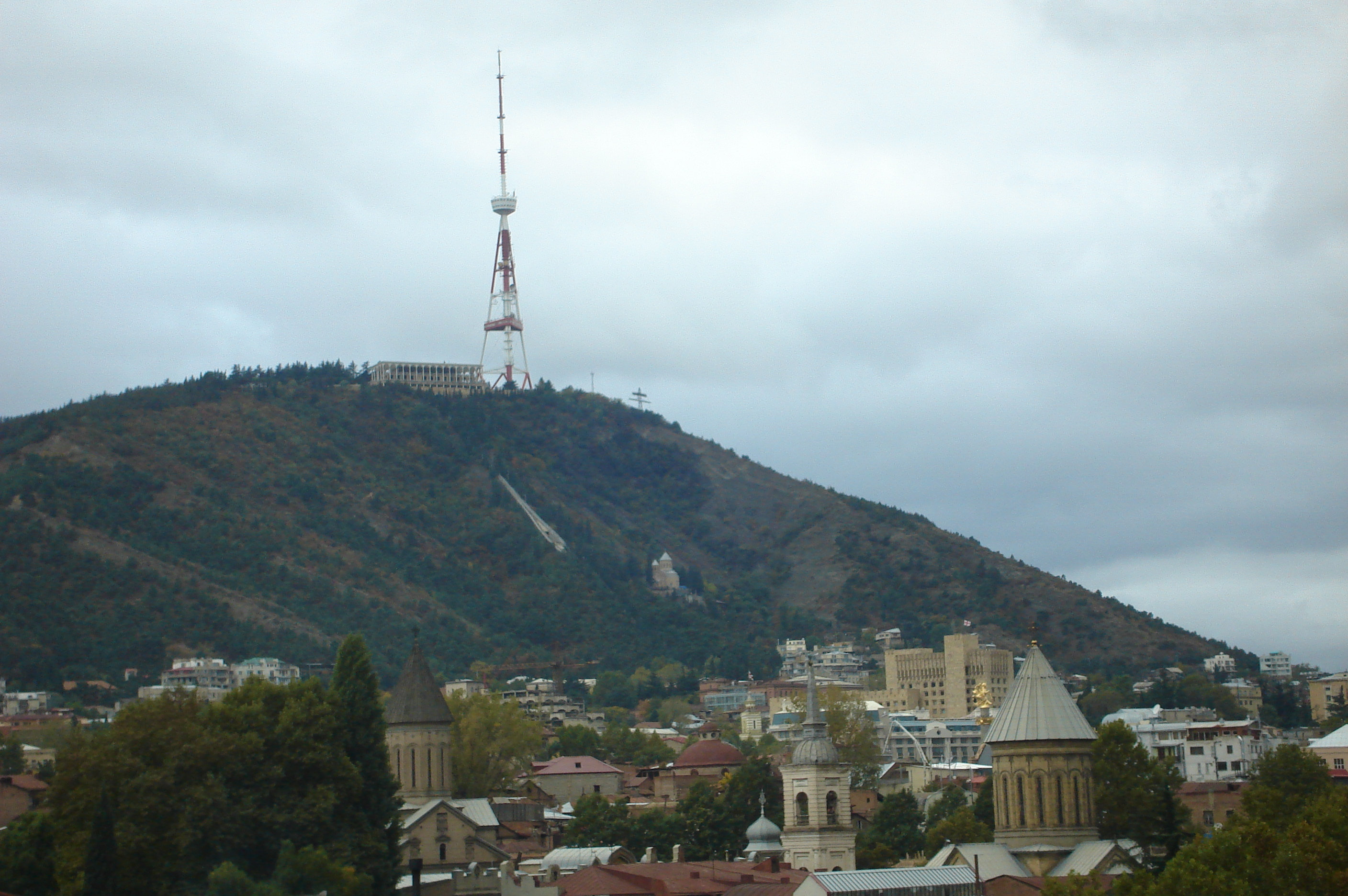
The Roadblock during teams' first leg in Georgia required one racer to climb the Tbilisi TV Broadcasting Tower.

Airdates: 29 November 2014, 3 & 6 December 2014

- Petah Tikva (HaMoshava Stadium)
- Tel Aviv (Ben Gurion Airport → Tbilisi, Georgia (Tbilisi International Airport)
- Martqopi (Zaza's Chicken Farm)
- Tbilisi (Tqkap Junkyard or Dry Bridge Bazaar)
- Tbilisi (Tbilisi Classical Gymnasium)
- Tbilisi (Erisioni Dance Academy)
- Tbilisi (Tbilisi-Spa)
- Tbilisi (Olympic Reserves National Training Centre)
- Tbilisi (Tbilisi TV Broadcasting Tower) (Overnight Rest)
- Tbilisi (Mukhiani District – Soviet Apartment Blocks)
- Tbilisi (Alexander Park)
- Tbilisi (Chronicle of Georgia)

This leg's Detour was a choice between ז׳רטיס שמברבלי (ჯართის შემგროვებელი – Jartis Shembarebeli) or צ'ורצ'חלה (ჩურჩხელა – Churchkhela). In Jartis Shembarebeli, teams had to find the Tqkap Junkyard, where they would have to load old broken car parts onto the roof of another car and secure them down with seatbelts. Once everything was secure, teams had to manually push the cars out of the gates of the junkyard to get their next clue. In Churchkhela, teams had to find the Dry Bridge Bazaar, where they would pick up a display of Churchkhela, a local candy. They would have to sell every piece of candy they had for 1lari each. They could exchange all of their money for their next clue. Teams were then directed to the Tbilisi Classical Gymnasium, where they found the U-Turn reveal board.

For this season's first Duel, teams had to face off against one another in Chidaoba Wrestling, where contestants wore vests that could be grabbed by opponents. Two members of the team would fight each other, trying to throw the other to the ground or force them out of the ring. Then, the other two team members would fight. The first team to win two matches would receive their next clue. The team that lost the final Duel had to wait out a fifteen-minute penalty.

In this season's first Roadblock, one team member had to climb up the ladder attached to one of the legs of the tower, and then continue climbing up a rope ladder. They then had to cross one of the support beams of the tower before they could pull up their next clue, dangling in the air by a rope.

Additional tasks

- Upon arrival in Tbilisi, teams had to grab a clue from the windshield of one of 12 vehicles. Six of these clues would allow the team to depart immediately, while the other six required the teams to wait 30-minutes before departing.
- At Zaza's Chicken Farm in Martqopi, one team member had to enter an empty chicken pen and be covered with honey, chicken feed and worms while they lay on the ground. The other team member then had to enter an adjoining pen and move all of the chickens from there into the one with their partner. Only once the second pen was cleared of chickens, they had to search among the many eggs hidden there for one with a golden-coloured yolk inside, which could turn in for their next clue. Before departing the farm, teams had to vote the U-Turn.
- At the Erisioni Dance Academy, teams had to learn and perform a complex Georgian dance, which involves timed steps and jumps, stunt fighting with swords and shields, and balancing a wine bottle on their heads, to the judges satisfaction to receive their next clue.
- At Tbilisi-Spa, teams had to give a local man a mud bath, covering all exposed skin on his body except his head. After it soaked his skin for a certain time, they would scrape it off and wash his body before receiving their next clue.
- At Tbilisi TV Tower, teams signed up for departure times in the following morning. Four teams would leave at 8:30, four would leave at 9:15, and the last four would leave at 10:00.
- At Soviet Era Apartment building in Mukhiani district, teams had to search for one of two elderly women. These women would try to teach the teams how to say a classical Georgian nursery rhyme. Every so often, the women would insist that both team members eat either a Khinkali or a Lobiani, both full of dough and calories. When teams could recite the nursery rhyme, they would get their next clue.
- At Alexander Park, one team member had to partner with a local to describe the letters of the Georgian alphabet that made up a phrase, using their bodies to indicate the shape of the letter. If the other team member could spell out the phrase, they would receive a picture of the Chronicle of Georgia monument, depicting their only clue as to the location of the Pit Stop.

=== Leg 3 (Georgia) ===
The Holy Trinity Cathedral of Tbilisi was the Pit Stop for the third leg.

Airdates: 10, 13 & 17 December 2014

- Tbilisi (Chronicle of Georgia)
- Tbilisi (Tbilisi Central Station)
- Tbilisi (Dr. Ilya Stomtashvili Dental Office)
- Akhalsopeli, Kvemo Kartli (Tamura Farm)
- Gachiani (Sheep Farm)
- Rustavi (Rustavi Metallurgical Plant)
- Tbilisi (Pushkin Park)
- Tbilisi (Georgian National Youth Palace)
- Tbilisi (Sameba Cathedral)

In this leg's Roadblock, one team member had to search through 45 full sets of matryoshka dolls to find one piece that was marked with a tiny Amazing Race flag to get their next clue. However, the teammate who did not participate in this Roadblock had to put back together all of the matryoshka dolls that their teammate had taken apart. Once all of the dolls were reassembled, teams were permitted to leave the site. Before departing, teams would discover if they were Yielded.

Additional tasks

- At Tbilisi central station, teams had to search for a person with gold teeth, who would hand them a business card written entirely in Georgian.
- At the dental office of Dr. Ilya Stomtashvili, teams had to fill out a medical questionnaire and then be told to sit in the dentist's chair. Mr. Stomtashvili and his assistant would make to appear as if teams had to endure a painful dental procedure, but it was all a show to scare the teams. Afterwards, teams would receive a false gold tooth to wear over one of their regular teeth and their next clue. Before departing, teams would vote for the team they wished to Yield.
- At Tamura Farm, teams had to unload 150 hay bales off of a truck and stack them into a neat arrangement on the ground to receive their next clue.
- At the sheep farm in Gachiani, teams had to choose a number between 1 and 100. They would then have to chase after a flock of sheep, each wearing a tag with the numbers 1 to 100 on it, and find the sheep that had a tag matching the number they had chosen. Once they found it, they would carry it out of the pasture and fully shear it to get their next clue.
- At the metallurgical plant in Rustavi, teams had to carry many heavy pieces of scrap metal into the plant and place them into a marked bin. One team member would then use the plant's crane to pick up and move the bin to a marked "X" on the ground to receive their next clue.
- On the way to Pushkin Park, one team member would have to dress as a Soviet-era dictator. Once at the park, teams had to paste 56 propaganda posters (featuring pictures of themselves) to a 10-foot-high wall. They would then have to take one of two kinds of pictures with locals. The one dressed as the dictator either had to take a picture with a baby or young child, or had to be photographed with three different locals kissing their hand. Once the photos were approved, teams would receive their next clue.
- At the Pit Stop at Sameba Cathedral, the Yielded team had to wait out their 15-minute penalty before checking in.

=== Leg 4 (Georgia → Sweden) ===
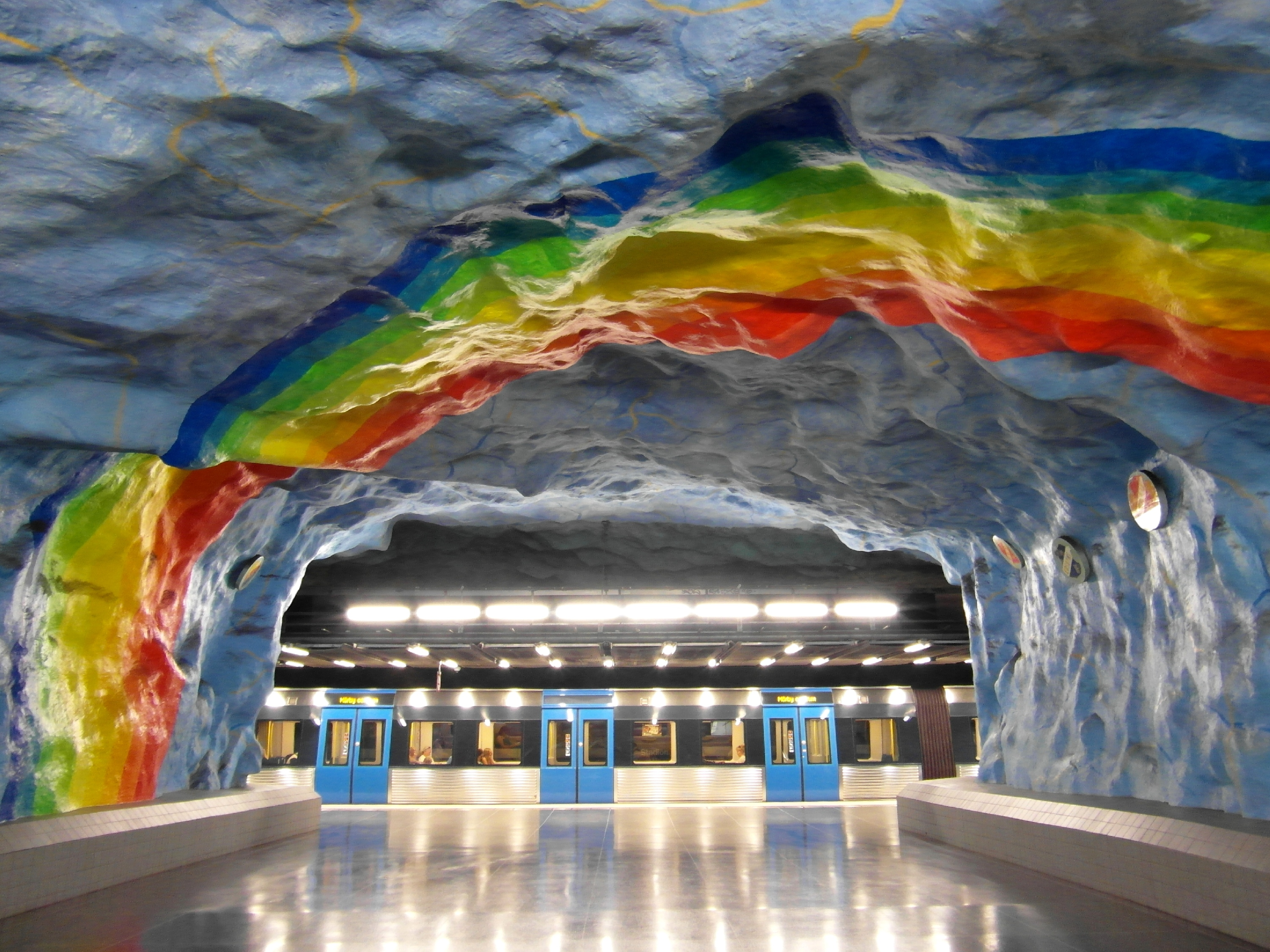
Teams finished this leg in the capital of Sweden at Stadion metro station, one of Stockholm's unique metro stations.

Airdates: 20, 24 & 27 December 2014

- Tbilisi (Sameba Cathedral)
- Tbilisi (Tbilisi International Airport) → Stockholm, Sweden (Stockholm Arlanda Airport)
- Stockholm (Hötorget)
- Stockholm (Biskopsudden (in Swedish))
- Stockholm (Vasa Museum)
- Stockholm (Djurgården)
- Stockholm (Brunnsviken – Brunnsvikens Kanotklubb (in Swedish))
- Stockholm (Danicahallen Sports Hall)
- Stockholm (Södra Teatern)
- Stockholm (Soile Monica Katrina Nord)
- Stockholm (Stadion Metro Station)

This leg's Detour was a choice between גרביים (Garbayim – Socks) or גלגיליות (Galgilyiot – Skates), both of which were themed after Pippi Longstocking and required teams to wear Pippi Longstocking wigs. In Socks, team members would each have to put on 10 pairs of stockings at once. Then they had to bounce on a trampoline, and had to continue bouncing while trying to take off the socks and hang them on a clothesline above. Once all 20 pairs of socks were hanging, teams would get their next clue. In Skates, one team member had to put on a pair of roller skates. Then, each team member had to stay at opposite ends of one of the roads in the park with frying pans, trying to pass a pancake between each other using them. Teams had to exchange the pancake every time they passed a mark along the road, of which there were at least 30. Once at the end, teams then had to toss the pancake onto a plate. Once 15 pancakes, taken one at a time through this process, were on the plate, teams would get their next clue. Teams would also find a U-Turn reveal board before leaving.

For this leg's Duel, teams had to get into kayaks, with one team member paddling and the other standing up and holding a battering weapon. The two standing members of each team had to battle it out and try to knock their opponent into the water. The one left standing would receive the next clue. The team that lost the final Duel had to wait out a fifteen-minute penalty.

In this leg's Roadblock, one team member had to pick a rabbit and run it through a rabbit show jumping course without knocking over any of the obstacles to get their next clue.

Additional tasks

- Upon arrival in Stockholm, teams had to choose an attractive local Swede who would act as their guide for the first part of this leg, as well as their driver. This local would stay with them until further notice, though teams still had to do all of the navigating. If teams spend too much time between tasks, such as when driving or looking for clues, the local would periodically insist that the teams receive a Swedish massage from them, which they would be obliged to accept.
- At Hötorget, teams would vote for who would be U-Turned before searching for an ABBA fan who had their next clue. Teams would have to dress as pop stars and choose an ABBA song. They would perform this song on the street for locals, and had to earn 100 krona from locals. However, teams were only permitted to beg once the audio track switched over to "Money, Money, Money" until they would get their next clue.
- At the Vasa Museum, teams had to search the interior for a clue. At this point, they would say goodbye to their Swedish locals and leave their cars behind. Teams would have to dress up in Viking costumes and use public buses to travel to Djurgården. There, teams would have to toss axes at a wooden target. One team member would throw axes until they hit the target, and then their partner would go. The yellow area of the target was worth 10 points, the black area worth 20, and the red center worth 30. Together, teams had to score at least 30 points, so if the first team member hit the center, the second team member would not have to hit the target. The next clue would direct them to a different area of the park, where they would have to eat a can of surströmming, one of the most foul-smelling foods in the world, to receive their next clue.
- While making their way to Södra Teatern, teams would be given information about five famous Jewish people who had won the Nobel Prize: Albert Einstein, Ada Yonath, Arieh Warshel, Avram Hershko and Dan Shechtman. They had to try to memorize all of the achievements that earned these people the award. They then had to enter the theatre and put on a mock presentation ceremony for two of these people, making sure to correctly recite all five achievements for each. If everything was correct, teams would receive their next clue.
- At Soile Monica Katrina Nord, a scientist would give teams their next clue, but would put it through a paper shredder when teams arrived. Teams had to put the shreds back together to discover the location of the Pit Stop at Stadion Metro Station. Teams that showed up after the station closed at 1:00 a.m. would find the Pit Stop just outside the entrance.

=== Leg 5 (Sweden → Finland) ===
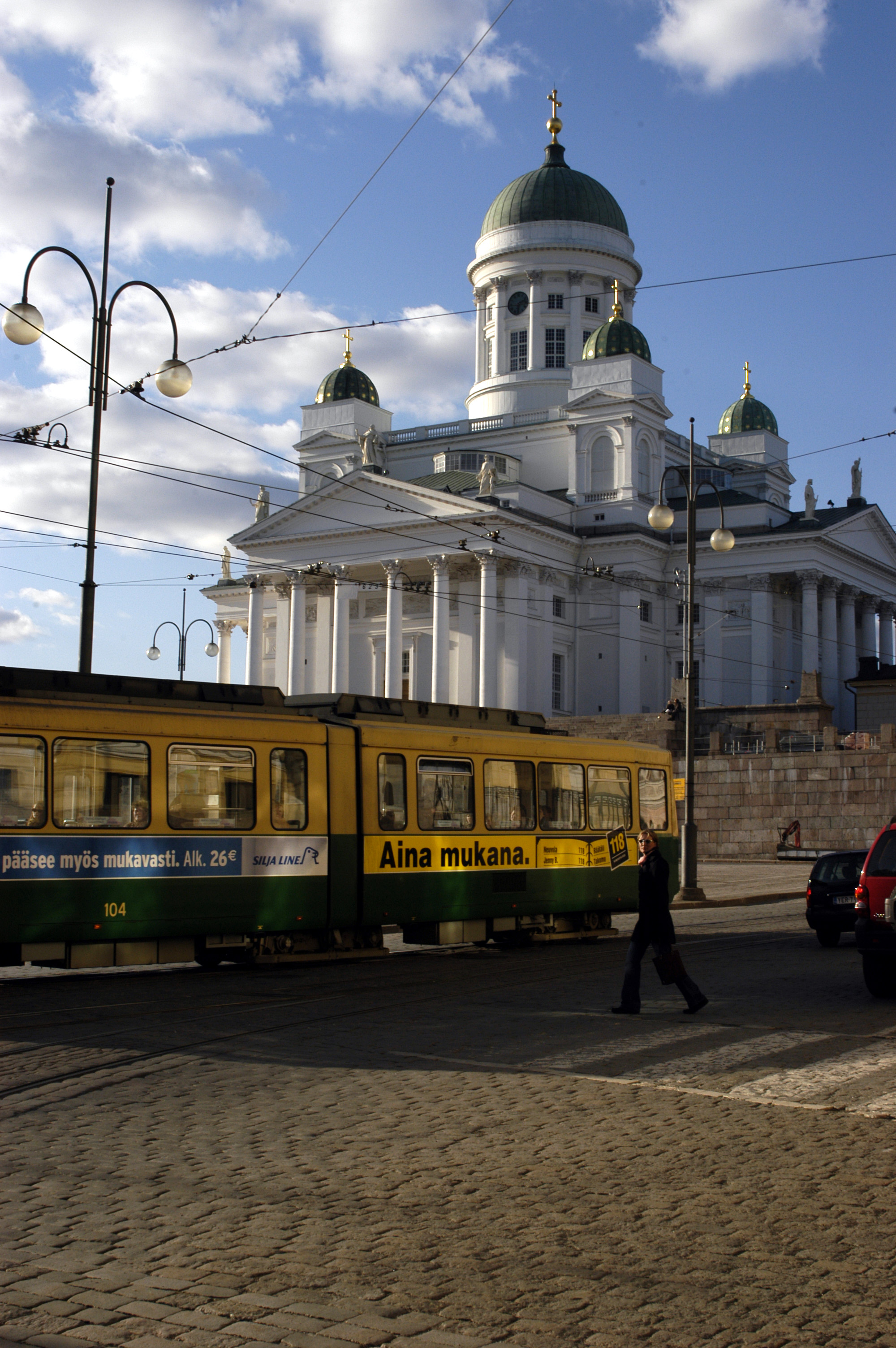
While in Helsinki, teams visited the famous Senate Square where they had a task involving the Finnish language.

Airdates: 31 December 2014, 3 & 7 January 2015

- Stockholm (Stockholm Tegelvikshamnen) → Helsinki, Finland (Katajanokka Terminal)
- Helsinki (Sauna Arla (in Finnish))
- Helsinki (Kaivopuisto)
- Helsinki (Kaisaniemi Park)
- Helsinki (Tavastia Klubi)
- Helsinki (Senate Square)
- Helsinki (Kauppatori Ferry Terminal) → Suomenlinna (Suomenlinna Ferry Terminal)
- Suomenlinna (Pikku Mustasaari (in Finnish))
- Suomenlinna (King's Gate)

Additional tasks

- Teams had to travel by ferry from Stockholm to Helsinki and would receive their next clue from Captain Olaf after docking.
- At Sauna Arla, teams had to enter a sauna room with temperatures from 80-100 degrees Celsius, wipe the sweat off of each other with cloths and deposit the sweat into a measuring cup until they had collected at least 50 mL of sweat to receive their next clue. If the heat became too much for teams, they would have to wait outside in their bathing suits for 20 minutes before being allowed to continue. Before leaving the sauna, teams voted for who would be Yielded.
- At Kaivopuisto, teams took part in a game of Angry Birds. One team member would dress as the red bird, while the other would dress as the pig king. The bird would be attached to a gigantic slingshot and be flung into the air, while the pig had to stand in a marked circle and toss a ball so that the bird could catch it. Teams only had four balls per launch. If successful, teams would be given their next clue.
- At Kaisaniemi Park, teams participated in the sport of mobile phone throwing. One team member had to throw a stool into a large hoop, their partner had to throw a boot into a medium hoop, and then the first team member would have to throw a mobile phone into a small hoop. Team members would have to spin around eight times before making each throw. After getting their clue, teams would discover if they were Yielded before leaving.
- At Tavastia Klubi, teams dressed in a two-person envelope costume, recalling the days before SMS was invented and first distributed in Finland. Once at the club, teams would dress up as Finnish Heavy Metal musicians, including extensive face-paint. They would have to learn how to perform a heavy metal cover of one of two Hebrew songs that are much calmer: "Let It Be" (לו יהי) or "Where Are Those Girls?" (איפה הן הבחורות ההן). If their performance met the satisfaction of a panel of judges, they would receive their next clue. Teams would then have to travel on foot to their next destination, Senate Square, while wearing headphones playing heavy metal music at full volume, and could not take them off until they arrived.
- At Senate Square, one team member would meet with a Finnish interpreter who would teach them how to say everyday questions in Finnish. They would relay these questions to their partner via walkie-talkie, who would have to ask them to passersby. If they spoke the questions legibly enough to be understood and receive an expected answer three times, they would receive their next clue.
- At the islands of Suomenlinna, teams had to travel by canoe from the island of Pikku Mustasaari, through the canals between the islands, to reach the Pit Stop at King's Gate.

=== Leg 6 (Finland) ===
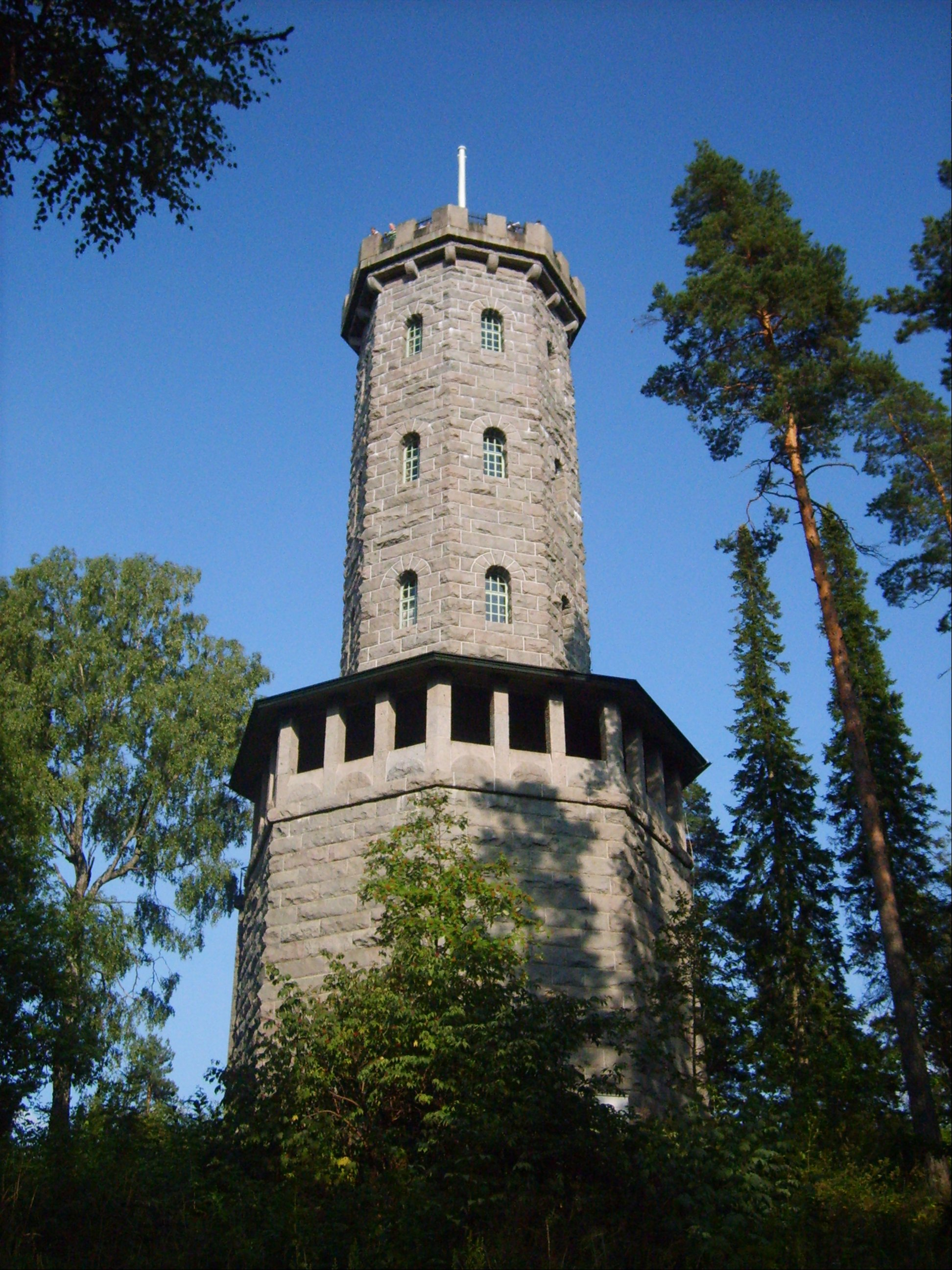
The Aulanko Tower was the Pit Stop for the sixth leg.

Airdates: 7, 10, 14 & 17 January 2015

- Suomenlinna (Suomenlinna Ferry Terminal) → Helsinki (Kauppatori Ferry Terminal)
- Helsinki (Kivikon Hiihtohalli)
- Helsinki (Suburbs)
- Porvoo (Church Square)
- Porvoo (Kokonniemen Maauimala)
- Loviisa (Port of Valko)
- Uusimaa (Bekananoka Oi Swamp)
- Hämeenlinna (City Square)
- Tyrväntö (Petäys Resort)
- Hämeenlinna (Aulanko Tower (in Finnish))

This leg's Detour was a choice between לפשפש (Lapeshpesh – Rummage) or לייבש (Laibesh – Dry). In Rummage, teams would have to choose one of three distinct plastic fish-shaped lures. They then had to climb into a waist-deep container of fish guts and garbage body parts, searching for a matching lure somewhere in the muck. If they found it, they would get their next clue. In Dry, teams had to filet fish and cut off their heads, skewering the heads onto a spike and threading six of them together into a fish head necklace. Each necklace that teams made had to be worn until the challenge was done. Once teams had created six necklaces and hung them out to dry, they would get their next clue. Before leaving the harbour, teams would also find the U-Turn reveal board.

Additional tasks

- At Kivikon Hiihtohalli, described to teams as the "Snow Centre of Helsinki", teams entered a temperature controlled room that recreated Finnish Lapland, and found their next clue at the ice bar. One team member had to dress as Santa Claus, while the other would dress as Rudolph the Red-Nosed Reindeer. The two would attach themselves to a single pair of skis and travel along a snowy path, picking up presents from along the path. All of the presents they picked up had to have the same kind of wrapping. Another member dressed as Rudolph would pull the one dressed as Santa, who was riding with the presents in a sleigh. The teams' next clue instructed them to travel into the Helsinki suburbs to deliver the presents to passers-by. Each Finnish local could only receive one present, and teams were specifically instructed not to give the presents to working people such as taxi drivers. The locals had to open up the gifts in the presence of teams, one of which had their next clue inside.
- Teams were then told to travel to the church square in Porvoo after being provided a driver for the rest of the leg. There, teams had to load pieces of firewood into a wheelbarrow, twice the amount that the wheelbarrow could fit. They then had to transport it through town, up and down hills and over very uneven pavement, with each team member lifting one of the wheelbarrow's handles. Once they delivered the wood to a specified address, they would get their next clue.
- At Kokonniemen Maauimala, teams would participate in the local sport of wife-carrying. One team member would have to hold the other team member upside down around their back as if they were a backpack. While carrying their partner like this, they had to run through a course around the lake and through shallow parts of it. They would also have to climb over hay bales. Traditionally in this sport, the one being carried is a female as per the name, and so any males who were being carried had to wear a blonde female wig. After completing the course, teams would receive their next clue and will vote for the upcoming U-Turn.
- At Bekananoka Oi swamp, teams would participate in a game of swamp volleyball. Teams would play volleyball against a pair of local players in the mud of a swamp. The first team to reach 10 points would win; if teams won a match they would get their next clue.
- At the city square of Hämeenlinna, one team member had to stand behind a line on the ground and throw fruit pies at their partner standing a distance away. They would have to try to hit their partner in the face with a berry pie. If teams found a berry pie, but it didn't hit the recipient's face, it didn't count. Once teams scored a hit, they would receive their next clue.
- At the Petäys Resort, teams had to stand on the ends of a log and roll it in the water so that it made 10 complete rotations. Any full rotations made would be saved even if teams fell in the water, but doing so requires teams to serve a 1-hour penalty and then have only one team member roll on the log. Once 10 rotations had been made, teams would get their next clue.
- At Aulanko Tower, teams would have to climb to the top of the 322 stairs leading to the tower as if it were a board game, with each step representing a space. Teams would continually roll a pair of dice to advance up the stairs. Some spaces, however, would force them to a higher or lower point on the staircase, or even direct them directly to the top (landing on the 320th step, would send teams all the way back to the first step). Teams would find the Pit Stop once they reached to the top of the tower.

=== Leg 7 (Finland → England) ===
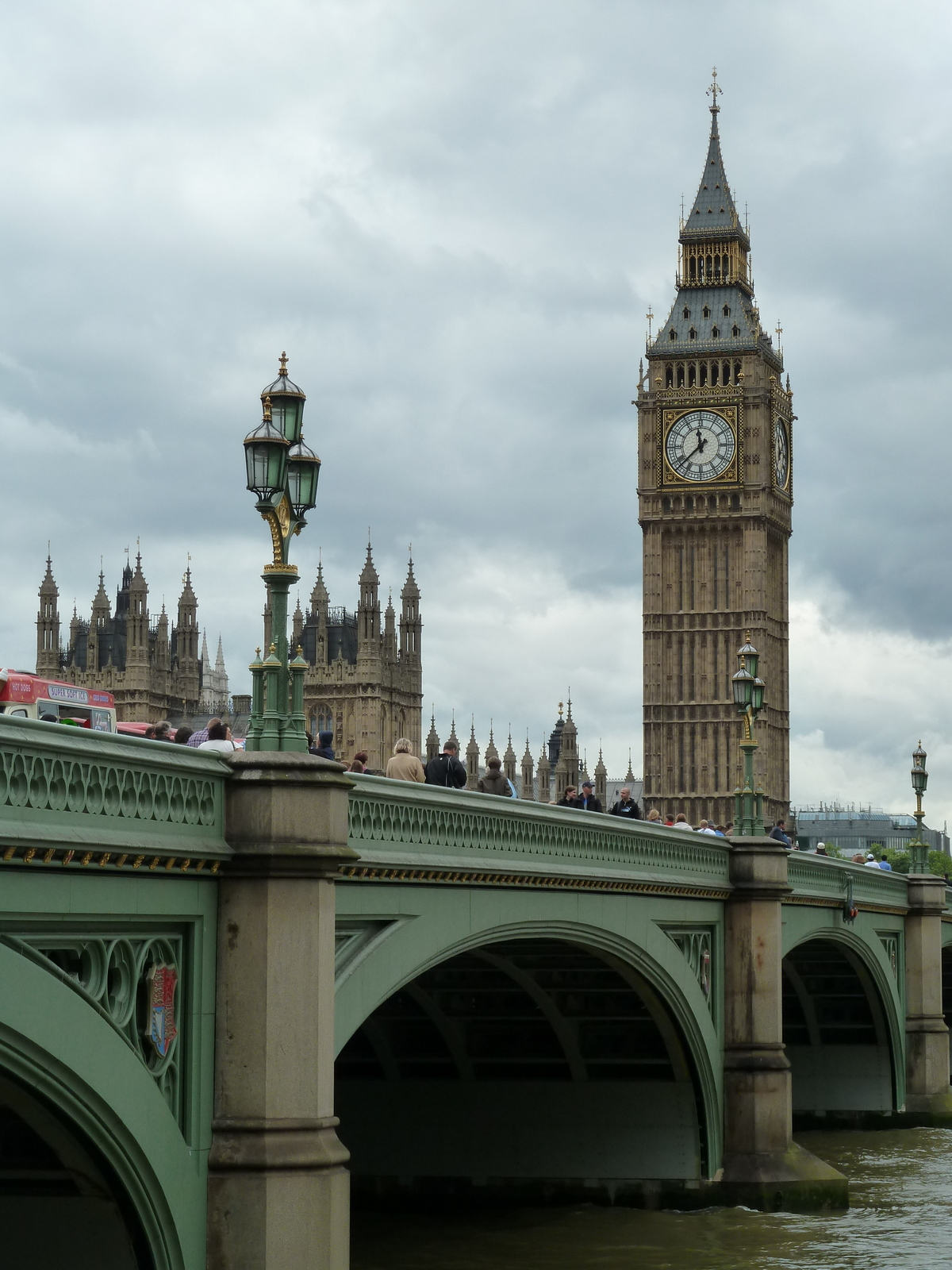
The Westminster Bridge overlooking Big Ben was the Pit Stop for the seventh leg.

Airdates: 21, 24 & 28 January 2015

- Helsinki (Scandic Grand Marina)
- Helsinki (Helsinki–Vantaa Airport) → London, England (Heathrow Airport)
- London (Camden Market)
- London (Goldsmiths' Hall)
- London (Limehouse Marina → St Katharine Docks – Presidents Quay House)
- London (Tate Modern)
- London (Ministry of Sound)
- London (St John's, Smith Square)
- London (Somerset House)
- London (Portobello Road – The London Antique Clock Centre)
- London (Westminster Bridge)

In this leg's James Bond-themed Roadblock, one team member would be given a martini to hold until they had completed the task. After traveling from Limehouse Marina to the Presidents Quay House by speedboat, the chosen team member would have to figure out the code to unlock a safe containing the key to the telephone box. The code could be deciphered by arranging six actors who had played the part of James Bond into chronological order. The team member had to arrange placards of the actors into the correct order, all while holding the martini, and then use the numbers on the placards to figure out the code. Once they had unlocked the save, rescued the girl, and disarmed the bomb, teams would get their next clue. However, there was a 2-minute time limit before the bomb "exploded", at which point teams would be sent to the back of the queue to try again.

For this leg's Duel, one team member from each team would dress up as a member of the Queen's Guard and had to stand before a guardhouse. The remaining team member of the opposing team would then try to get them to flinch or laugh, using whatever means they wished without touching them. The first guard to crack would lose the Duel. The team that lost the final Duel had to wait out a fifteen-minute penalty.

This leg's Detour was a choice between מטריות (Mitriyot – Umbrellas) or לא להיות (Lo LiHiot – Not To Be). In Umbrellas, one team member made their way to a plaza where a series of umbrellas were arranged, each with a letter of the English alphabet written on top. Their partner would be on the balcony above with a clear view of the umbrellas, and had to help the one on the ground spell out the famous word from Mary Poppins – Supercalifragilisticexpialidocious – to receive their next clue from a Mary Poppins impersonator. In Not To Be, teams had to learn and perform a scene from William Shakespeare's Romeo and Juliet, with one playing the part of Romeo and the other Juliet. They would be judged on memorization as well as their dramatic performance. If the judge gave his approval, teams would get their next clue.

Additional tasks

- At the beginning of the leg, teams were only given an instrumental version of Chava Alberstein's song "London" (Based upon a quote from a play by Hanoch Levin), and had to figure out that their next destination was London, England.
- At Camden Market, teams would pick up a mannequin and a satchel of coins. They had to use only this money to purchase five items to clothe their mannequin with, after which they would get their next clue. They would be surprised to learn that they would have to find people on the street who would be willing to exchange one of their own articles of clothing for one on the mannequin (for example, a shirt for a shirt). Teams had to exchange all five of their items with different locals in order to get their next clue.
- At Goldsmiths' Hall, teams would learn that they were to have dinner with Queen Elizabeth II. They would dress in formal tuxedos and be instructed in the strict decorum they had to observe while in the queen's presence. They would then enter the dining hall and have a short dinner with an Elizabeth II impersonator. They would have to bow, compliment her and behave properly, among many other things. If the Queen was dissatisfied, she would send them out to try again. When the dinner was complete, a maid would rush in saying there was an "urgent" message for the Queen, which would direct to the teams, who discovered it was their Roadblock clue presented to them to a tablet. A man dressed as a James Bond villain from Doctor No would ask them the Roadblock prompt, and then boast that he had locked "their girl" in a red telephone box with a bomb strapped to her, and to come and save her.
- At Tate Modern, teams had to pick up a mobile tea set. They had to convince three locals, either all at once or separate, to sit down and have tea with them. They had to ensure that all three locals ate six biscuits in order to get their next clue. A Double U-Turn voting board was found after this task, but it was not shown on air.
- At the Ministry of Sound, the Intersected teams would dress up as members of One Direction and learn how to perform a dance routine to the song "What Makes You Beautiful". They would have to perform this routine for a director and earn his satisfaction to get their next clue.
- At The London Antique Clock Centre at 87 Portobello Road, many of the clocks were marked with a sticker and stopped at 7:00. Teams were told to search for the one clock that was "not for sale", and were left to figure out that it was a small replica of Big Ben whose hour and minute hands were reversed, reading 11:35. Only one team could attempt this at a time, and each team was given a 200-second time limit. If they handed over the correct clock, they would receive their next clue.
- The clue after the clock task instructed teams to travel to the Pit Stop on a bridge next to "Elizabeth Tower", which teams had to figure out for themselves that this was another name for Big Ben.

=== Leg 8 (England → Costa Rica) ===
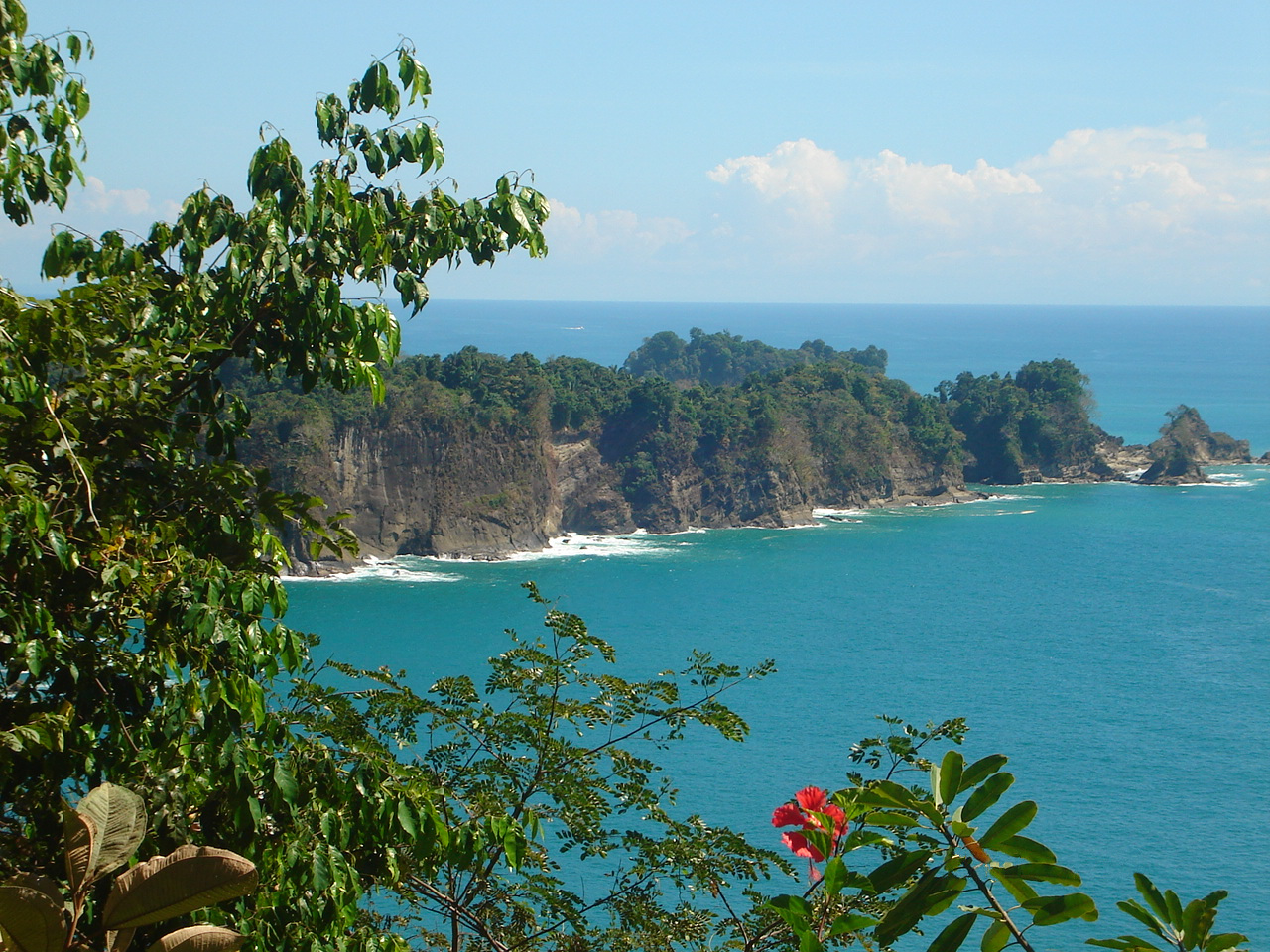
Manuel Antonio National Park was visited during this leg in Costa Rica.

Airdates: 4 & 7 February 2015

- London (The Stonemasons Arms)
- London (Heathrow Airport) → San José, Costa Rica (Juan Santamaría International Airport)
- Manuel Antonio National Park (Espadilla Beach)
- Jacó (Vista Los Sueños)
- Punta Leona (Playa Mantas)
- Jacó (Jacó Beach)
- Jacó (Playa Blanca)
- Jacó (Villa Caletas)

In this leg's Roadblock, one team member had to choose a surfer of the same gender that they were and then take a surfboard out onto the waters. They would be tied to the surfboard of their surfer with a white buoy in the middle. The team member and the surfer would try to paddle away from each other, much like in tug-of-war, and try to drag the white buoy across the yellow buoys on their side. Once the team member could do this, they would receive their next clue. Before leaving, teams would find out the results of the Yield.

Additional tasks

- Once in San José, teams voted for the upcoming Yield.
- At Manuel Antonio National Park, teams hiked through the park to reach Espadilla Beach. There, one team member would have to dive into the waters near the beach and retrieve sacks from under the water. They had the bring these sacks back to shore and weigh them, trying to reach a total weight of 21 kg. If their combined weight exceeded, they would have to start all over. Once they had the correct weight, they would receive their next clue.
- At Vista Los Sueños, teams would ride the Omega Canopy Ziplines. First, each team member would hurl themselves along the first line and then pull themselves along it to reach the end. Then, both would ride the second line while one team member sat upside down. The upside down team member would have to use a rope and hook to retrieve a cage with a toy Toucan halfway along the ride and hoist it to the end. Finally, both team members rode a third zipline to return to the start, where they would receive their next clue.
- At Jacó Beach, teams would take control of a copo vendor. They had to wheel it around, with one team member shaving ice off of a large ice cube to make the treats, and give away 50 properly-made ones to locals.
- At Playa Blanca, teams would find their own array of about 100 sandcastles. They had to dig below these sandcastles to find their next clue. If the sandcastle does not have a clue, racers had to rebuild the sandcastle before they could continue searching.
- At the Pit Stop at Villa Caletas, the Yielded team had to wait for 15 minutes before they could check-in.

=== Leg 9 (Costa Rica) ===
Parque Morazán in San José was the location of the Yield board of this leg.

Airdates: 11, 14 & 18 February 2015

- Sarapiquí (Hacienda Sueño Azul)
- Sarapiquí (Hacienda Sueño Azul – Suspension Bridge)
- Sarapiquí (Hacienda Sueño Azul – River Area)
- Puerto Viejo de Sarapiquí (Finca La Rebusca or Pineapple Field)
- Ticari (Repuestos Usados Cafetera)
- Ticari (Ticari Village)
- San Isidro de El General (Santa Elena)
- San Isidro de El General (Central Church)
- San José (Parque Morazán (in Spanish))
- San José (Edificio Metallica (in Spanish))

In this leg's Roadblock, one team member would have to traverse across a series of hammocks hanging between trees, making their way from the start to the end of the course without touching the ground. At the end of the last hammock, they would find their next clue. The clue then told teams that the other team member would have to complete the course in a must faster time, to receive their next clue proper. Before leaving the reserve, teams voted for who would be Yielded.

This season's final Detour was a choice between בננה (Banana) or אננס (Ananas – Pineapple). In Banana, teams made their way to Finca La Rebusca, a banana plantation, and entered the field of banana trees. Each team was given a number, and teams would have to find five bushels of bananas that were marked with this number and harvest them. They would then load the five bushels onto a hanging track and use the local pulley system to deliver them to the preparation plant, where they would receive their next clue. In Pineapple, teams made their way to a nearby pineapple field where they would have to harvest 100 pineapples and then load them into a truck to receive their next clue.

Additional tasks

- At the start of the leg, teams traveled by taxi to a marked area of the Hacienda Sueño Azul. At the bottom of a grassy valley, teams would find a pile of coconuts and some local baskets and tools, and teams had to use these tools and whatever other means available to them to transport 200 coconuts up the uneven hillside of the valley to a marked drop off point. Once 200 coconuts had been delivered, a man dressed as Baloo would give them their next clue.
- Teams then traveled to the reserve's suspension bridge and crossed it to enter the jungle. There, they would observe a sign with Spanish names and pictures for 12 creatures that could be found in the jungle, including bugs, frogs and a snake. Then, one team member would have to pick up six of these same living creatures from a cage and pass them to their partner, who had to place them correctly in 12 labeled cages. If all of the creatures were placed in the correct cages, teams would get their next clue from Mowgli.
- At Ticari Village, teams would discover the results of the Yield. Afterwards, teams would have to choose a local vending device that was essentially a tabletop attached to the top of a bicycle. They had to use this unwieldy device to transport glasses of juice, a maximum of 80 at a time, across a rugged path through the village. At the end of the path, teams had to pour the juice into a container, trying to fill it up to 8 quarts of juice. There was enough juice in 80 glasses for 8 quarts, so if teams did not spill anything they would only have to make one trip. After filling 8 quarts, teams would get their next clue.
- At San Isidro El General, teams had to find a cattle-drawn Sarapiquí cart in Santa Elena and convince two locals to take a ride in it. Teams would help lead the cattle through the streets to the town's church, where they received their next clue.
- At Parque Morazán in San José, teams would have to dress in gigantes y cabezudos costumes and dance to the music of a local band. As soon as the band stopped playing, teams could then run to the Pit Stop, while still wearing the costume, at the Edificio Metallica. The Yielded team had to wait for an hourglass to empty before beginning the task.

=== Leg 10 (Costa Rica → Bolivia) ===
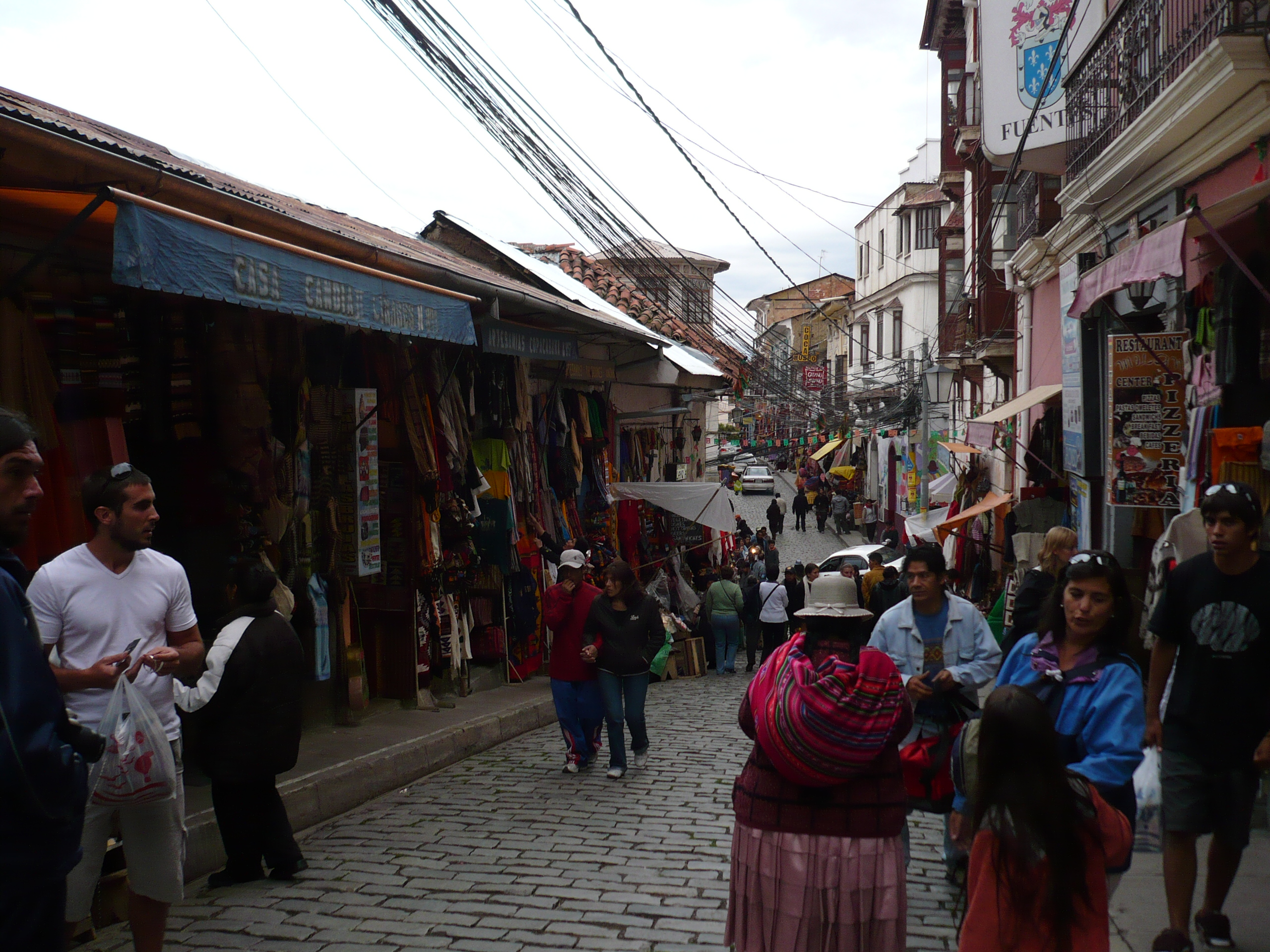
Teams visited The Witches' Market searching for a man dressed in traditional clothes.

Airdates: 21, 25 & 28 February 2015

- San José (La Sabana Metropolitan Park – León Cortés Statue)
- San José (Juan Santamaría International Airport) → La Paz, Bolivia (El Alto International Airport)
- La Paz (Paseo del Prado (in Spanish))
- El Alto (Coproca Textile Factory)
- La Paz (Mercado Rodriguez)
- La Paz (Basilica of San Francisco)
- La Paz (The Witches' Market)
- La Paz (Illampu Street)
- La Paz (Muzungu B&B)
- La Paz (Isaac Tamayo Street)
- La Paz (Garcilaso de la Vega Street)
- La Paz (Bush Avenue)
- La Paz (Garita de Lima Square)
- La Paz (Mirador Killi Killi (in Spanish))

In this season's final Roadblock, one team member and their chosen local would play a game show called כל ישראל אחים (All Brothers of Israel). They would be asked a series of "this or that" questions and both of them had to write down their answer. The team member and their local had to answer 15 questions exactly the same to receive their next clue.

Additional tasks

- At Paseo del Prado, teams voted for the team they wished to Yield.
- At the Coproca Textile Factory in El Alto, teams would pick up bags of alpaca hair and had to manually sort out five kilograms (11 lb) of white-coloured wool that they had to give to a staff member at the automation line. After a brief walking tour of the factory, teams had to stand together and wrap a spool of alpaca wool thread around themselves continually until all of the wool was off of the spool, revealing an image of an Amazing Race flag. Teams could then hand over the spool for their next clue.
- At Mercado Rodriguez, teams had to search for a Chola, who had their next clue underneath her bowler hat and would then join them as they traveled on foot to their next destination. Teams had to satisfy any desire that the Chola expressed along the way, which could involve carrying her belongings, buying her food, or stopping to rest.
- At the plaza of Basilica of San Francisco, teams would have to take on the job of shoe-shining. Teams had to shine the shoes of 10 locals, earning two Boliviano for each completed job which they would place in the Chola's hat. Once they had earned 20 Bolivianos, teams would receive their next clue, bidding farewell to their Chola.
- At the Witches' Market, teams have to look out for a man dressed as an ekeko with their next clue attached to him.
- At Illampu Street, also known as the Israeli's street, teams would have to search for an Israeli with a similar background to theirs. They could choose whoever they wanted, and once they made a choice they would find their next clue at the Muzungu B&B.
- At Isaac Tamayo Street, teams were told to find "Miguel", leaving teams to figure out that the person with their next clue was man named Miguel who was playing a set of panpipes. Specifically, he would be playing "Indian Love Song (Miguel)" by Alma Zohar, a song about a woman calling Miguel from Israel to say that she loved him.
- The clue Miguel gave them told them to enter the confusing market nearby and find a marked stall on Garcilaso de la Vega Street. The woman at the stall did not have a clue, but when teams arrived the telephone would start ringing. Teams would pick up the phone to find that their loved ones were calling them from Israel, just like in the aforementioned song. After the call, the teams' family told them their next clue.
- At Bush Avenue, teams took part in a task that referenced San Pedro prison, known for one of the most notorious and unusual prisons in the world. Team members would be locked in separate wooden cages and have their legs shackled. Each cage had a bowl of keys, and teams would have to use long wooden poles to transfer the keys from one cell to another, as one of the keys in each bowl would unlock the shackles of the one in the opposite cage. Once both team members were free, they would travel to Garita de Lima Square.
- At Garita de Lima Square, teams would find a sack full of hundreds of different kinds of potatoes. Teams would be tasked with searching for three specific kinds of potatoes, and would add up the total number of these three kinds that they found. The answer teams got would correspond with one of five boxes, marked 12 to 16. If teams got the correct answer of 15, they could open the corresponding crate to find a clue directing them to the Pit Stop. However, if teams were off then they would instead open one of the other crates, where they would find a clue directing them to the "Pit Stop" at a different location. Teams would have to walk to these locations (705 Nataniel Aguirre Street (12), 694-A Tamapaca Street (13), Galeria Incachaca (14), or 683 Monaypata Street (16)) before they would discover that the Pit Stop was not there and would have to return to the square to count again.

=== Leg 11 (Bolivia) ===
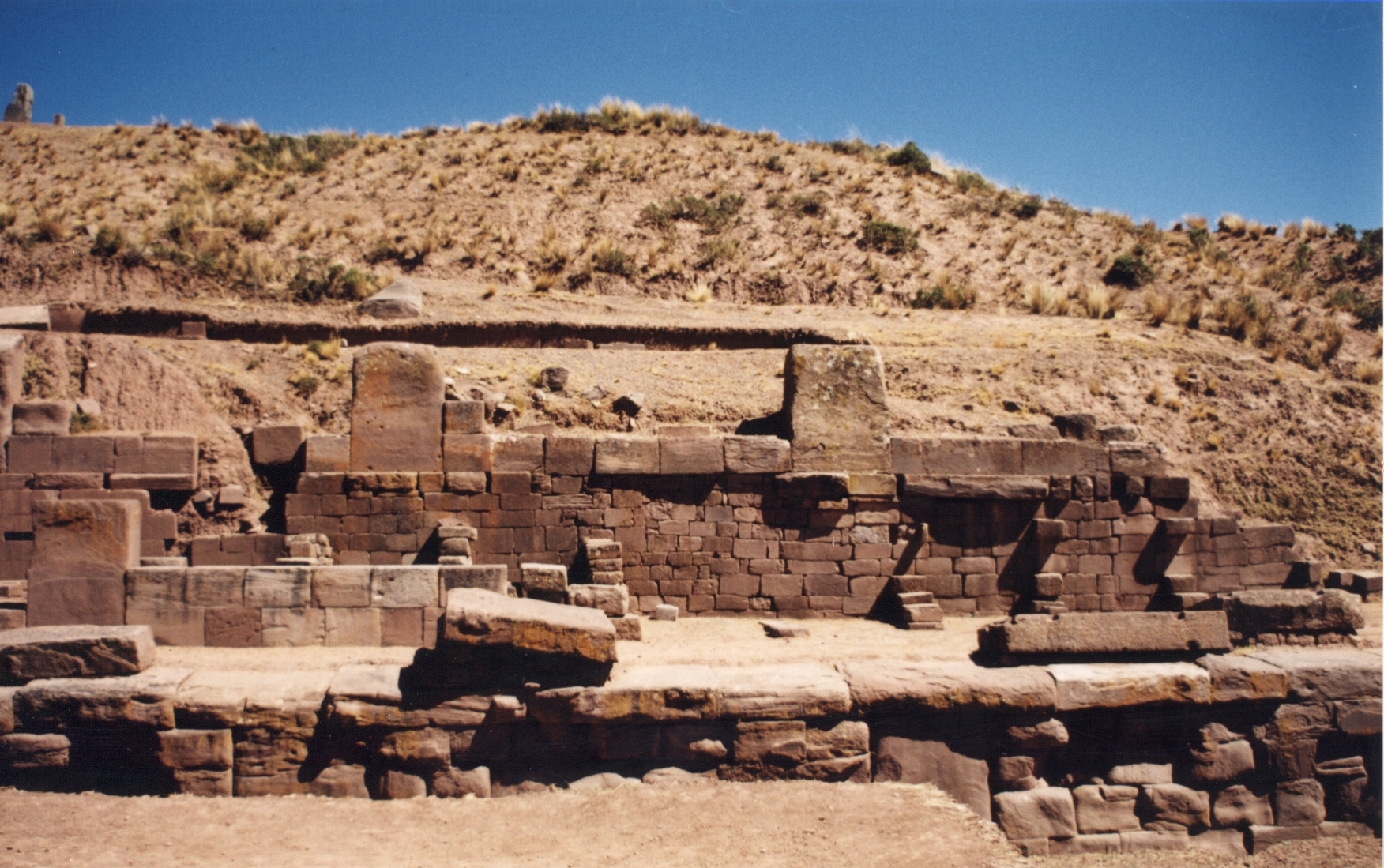
This leg's Duel took place at the Tiwanaku Ruins.

Airdates: 4 & 7 March 2015

- Laja (Church of Laja)
- Los Andes Province (Antahawa)
- Los Andes Province (Jorge's Llama Farm)
- Los Andes Province (Quinoa Farm)
- Tiwanaku (Tiwanaku Ruins)
- Chua Cocani (Fourth Naval District Titicaca)
- San Pedro de Tiquina (San Pablo Plaza)
- Huatajata (Kontiki Carpet Shop)
- Huatajata (Inca Utama Hotel)

For this season's final Duel, one team member from each competing team had to play on a best of three match of a traditional Incan game at Tiwanaku Ruins. They had to run around the field flipping the coins so that both halves are their respective colour. The first team to fully turn all three coins to their colour received their next clue. The team that lost the final Duel had to wait out a fifteen-minute penalty.

Additional tasks

- From the Church of Laja, teams traveled by mini bus down the La Paz-Copacabana highway to reach an area known as Antahawa. There, they had to use bricks, an ancient type of mortar, and a pre-made roof to replicate a small Incan house that matched an example to receive their next clue
- At Jorge's Llama Farm, teams would receive a llama and had to attach a sack of quinoa to it. Teams would then lead their llamas further down the highway to a marked quinoa farm, where they had to beat quinoa plants and sift the grain until they had filled a sack with one kilogram (2.2 lb) of quinoa to receive their next clue.
- At the naval base in Chua Cocani, they would meet a drill sergeant who would instruct them to do five pushups before he would give them their next clue. The teams' next task would be to learn a military march, with one team member holding a Bolivian flag while the other played a snare drum. After practicing the drill, teams would perform the march alongside a troupe of soldiers before the leader of the Bolivian military. If he was satisfied, then he would give them their next clue. The drill sergeant would routinely instruct teams who were not performing well enough during practice to perform more pushups.
- At the plaza of Tiquina, teams would have to unload all of the watermelons off of a truck and stack them into a pyramid to get their next clue.
- At the Kontiki Carpet shop, teams would be shown a specific symbol in their clue, and then one team member would have to search among the hundreds of carpets in the shop for one that had this same symbol as part of its design. However, the other team member would have to carry any carpets that their partner examined. If at any point they dropped any carpets onto the ground, the team would have to serve a 10-minute penalty outside before continuing. Once they found the carpet, they would get a clue directing them to the Pit Stop at the Inca Utama Hotel.

=== Leg 12 (Bolivia → Argentina) ===
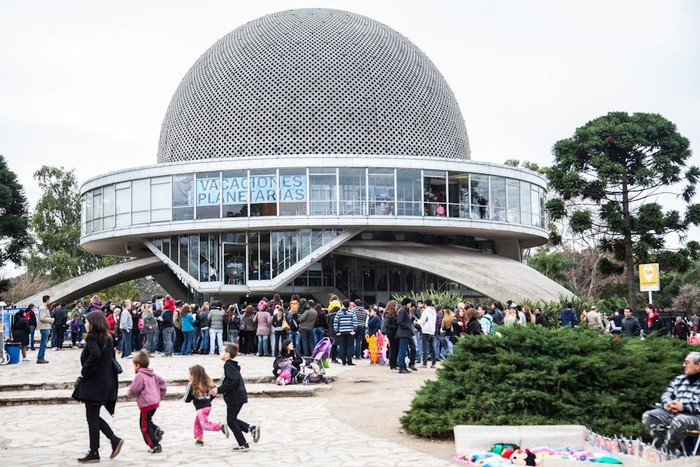
The Galileo Galilei Planetarium in Buenos Aires was the 12th Pit Stop.

Airdates: 14, 21 & 25 March 2015 (Note: No episode was aired on 18 March 2015 due to Reshet's coverage of the nationwide legislative elections.)

- La Paz (El Alto International Airport) → Buenos Aires, Argentina (Ministro Pistarini International Airport)
- Buenos Aires (Lagos del Rocío)
- Buenos Aires (Bosques de Palermo)
- Buenos Aires (Cine 25 de Mayo)
- Buenos Aires (Casa Rosada)
- Buenos Aires (9 de Julio Avenue)
- Sarandí (Villa 31)
- Buenos Aires (Digital Television Studio)
- Buenos Aires (Bubble Studios)
- Buenos Aires (El Ateneo Grand Splendid)
- Buenos Aires (Galileo Galilei Planetarium)

Additional tasks

- At Rocío Lake, teams would get onto a series of inner tubes and be pulled around the lake at high speeds. Before beginning the task, they had to designate one of the team members that would perform the task. This team member had to climb across two other inner tubes being pulled by the boat to retrieve five letter cards, one at a time, and bring them back to their partner. Once they had all five letter cards, they could bring them to shore and unscramble them into the word "Asado" (Roast) to receive their next clue.
- At the Palermo Woods, teams had to find a set of grills across the park. One team member would have to fan the grills and keep the fire burning while their partner performed the next task. They would receive 19 labels with the names of different types of beef transliterated from their Spanish name into Hebrew (Vova & Ala's labels were additionally transliterated into Russian). They had to put these labels onto a diagram of a cow's body, matching the type of beef with the body part it came from, and get 10 of them correct to receive their next clue.
- At the 25 de Mayo Cinema, teams watched a classic Argentine film was being played on the screen. Teams would have to search through a huge pile of filmstrips looking for the one that matched the film being played. If they could find it, they would take it to the projectionist to get their next clue.
- At Casa Rosada, teams would have to collect 20 locals in the nearby square to help them recreate the 1996 film Evita. Once they had 20 people, one team member would dress as Eva Perón, as portrayed by Madonna, and sing the film's main song "Don't Cry for Me Argentina". The other would present the 20 people with onions to chop, in order to "bring forth tears" like the audience in the film. Once the one playing Perón finished the song, teams would get their next clue.
- At 9 de Julio Avenue, teams had to use only their hands to carry four litres (0.88 imp gal; 1.1 US gal) of dulce de leche to a glass jar across the street to receive their next clue. This would prove difficult as 9 de Julio Avenue is the widest avenue in the world, spanning 18 lanes, thus teams would have to obey all pedestrian crossing signals, which would be enforced by crossing guards.
- At Villa 31, teams would recreate the story of 3000 Leagues in Search of Mother. Teams would dress as the main character, Marco Rossi, and would be given a monkey just like Rossi's. They then had to search through the neighbourhood for "mother", and would soon find cardboard cutouts of Rossi's mother along with their next clue. To the surprise of the teams, the cutouts would feature photographs of the teams' actual mothers.
- At the Digital Television Studio in Palermo, teams had to perform a scene from an Argentine telenovela. One would play the part of Gustavo, while the other would play Celeste, as they performed "The Race for Love", which co-starred and was directed by Felipe Colombo. Teams would have to perform the entire scene in Spanish, but were given scripts and teleprompters with the lines transliterated into Hebrew. During the scene, the maid character "Juanita" would perform many unscripted actions intended to throw teams off (She would feed Gustavo hot chilli sauce instead of soup and would give him a real slap in the face, and she would then actually pluck Celeste's eyebrows and would unexpectedly toss water on her when she 'fainted'). Teams would not be judged for how they acted during these unscripted portions, but had to maintain their integrity and focus for the rest of the scene. If Colombo approved of their acting, he would give them their next clue.
- At Bubble Studios, where they would have to learn how to perform a Tango dance while being suspended in the air by wires, which would include dancing while sideways and upside-down. If both team members could perform the dance with a professional partner, they would get their next clue.
- At the El Ateneo Grand Splendid bookstore, teams had to search for 10 marked books. Teams were not required to find all of them, but had to use the books' titles to discern the location of the Pit Stop. All of the books had something to do with something found in space, such as planets and stars, which would direct teams to the Galileo Galilei Planetarium.

=== Leg 13 (Argentina) ===
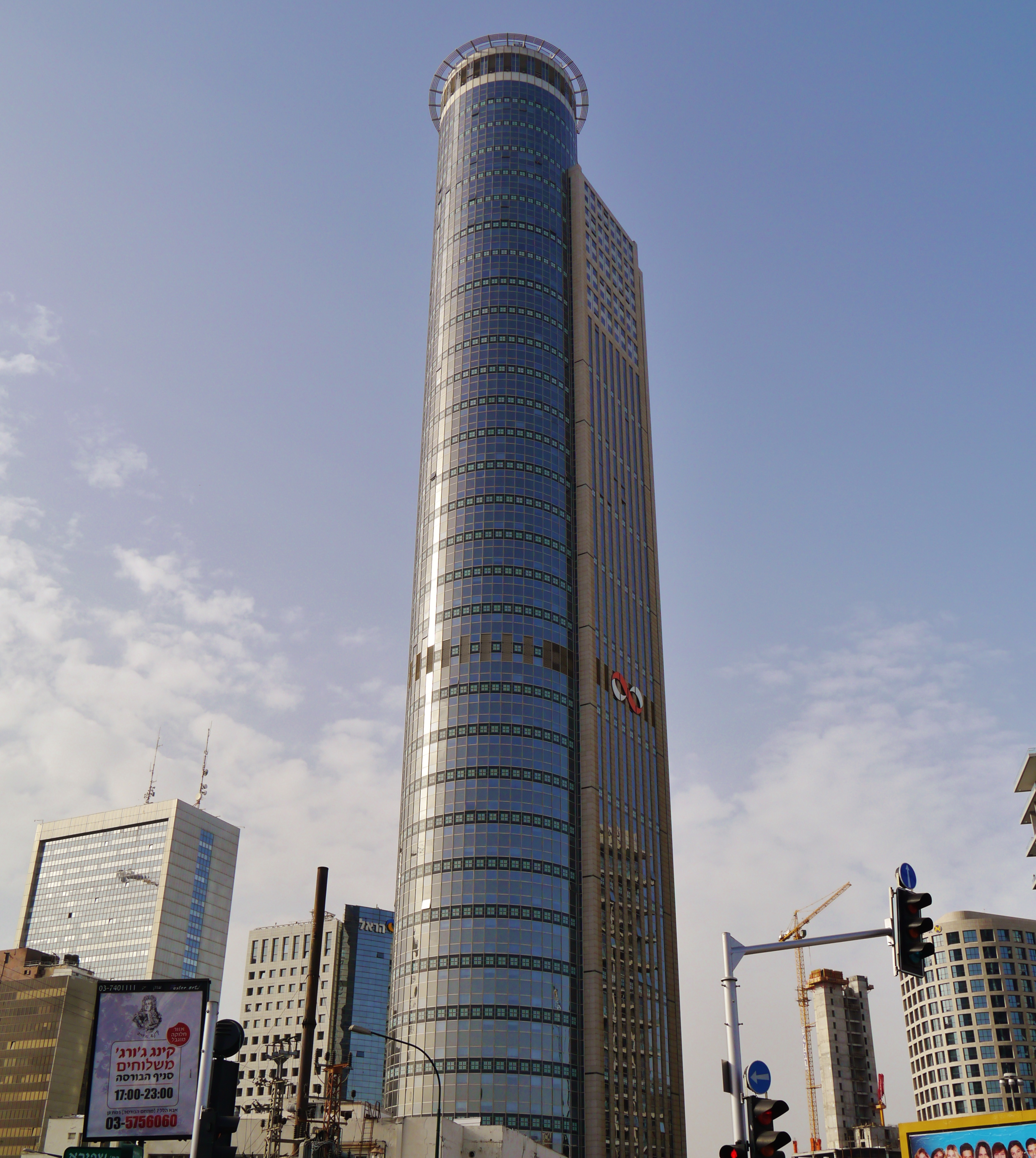
After racing through Argentina, teams returned to Israel and travel to the Moshe Aviv Tower in Ramat Gan to learn their overall placement.

Airdate: 28 March 2015

- La Plata (Aeroclub La Plata)
- Buenos Aires (Plaza San Martín)
- Buenos Aires (River Plate Stadium)
- Luján (Estancia La República)

Additional tasks

- At Aeroclub La Plata, teams would take a small charter plane flight over the city before returning to the old hangars of the airport. There, one team member would be attached to a crane and held upside-down like a pendulum. Their partner had to swing their partner around while also stacking a series of boxes directly beneath them, trying not to have their partner knock them over. Each of the boxes was decorated with the flag of a country that had been visited on the season, and they would have to be stacked in the correct chronological order from bottom to top so teams could get their next clue.
- At Plaza San Martín, teams had to use only forks, spoons and butter knives to hack away a 50-kilogram (110 lb) block of chocolate and find a tiny Amazing Race flag somewhere inside they could exchange for their next clue.
- At River Plate Stadium, teams had to climb up a humongous climbing rig being held high in the air by a crane. They would start at the bottom of the rig and had to make their way up to four levels that each featured long beams extending outwards in either direction. These beams would also tilt, requiring teams to balance themselves on either side so that they could make their way to the ends. At the end of each beam, teams would find a number, and each team member had to traverse four of the beams to find four numbers. These numbers, when put together, would reveal the two years that Argentina won the FIFA World Cup (1978 & 1986). Once they had made it to the top, returned safely to the ground, and gave the two years to a judge, they would receive their final clue.
- At Estancia La República, teams would find only an empty Pit Stop mat and another clue box. Teams were informed that they had finished and were told to fly back to Tel Aviv, where they had to make their way to the rooftop of Moshe Aviv Tower in Ramat Gan to discover their overall placement.

== Ratings ==
The fourth season averaged a 33.6% average and 46.3% household share with approximately a million viewers tuning in regularly across the season. The finale received ratings of 41.8% and 58.1% household share with 1.5 million viewers watching the episode, which was an all-time record for a finale episode of a reality competition show.

Data courtesy of the Israeli Rating Committee, according to individuals aged 4+ from the general population.

No.	Air date	Episode	Percentage	Nightly Rank	Ref
1	22 November 2014	"Kickoff Event!"	17.9%	1	
2	26 November 2014	"New Teams Join"	14.0%	1	
3	29 November 2014	"Landing in Georgia"	16.4%	1	
4	3 December 2014	"Georgian Battle"	11.9%	1	
5	6 December 2014	"The Tallest Tower in Georgia"	16.5%	1	
6	10 December 2014	"Gold Tooth Mission"	13.7%	1	
7	13 December 2014	"Silence of the Lambs!"	15.5%	1	
8	17 December 2014	"Elimination in Georgia"	13.3%	1	
9	20 December 2014	"Landing in Sweden!"	15.1%	1	
10	24 December 2014	"Swedish Delicacy"	14.0%	1	
11	27 December 2014	"Elimination in Sweden"	15.8%	1	
12	31 December 2014	"Hot Finland!"	14.7%	1	
13	3 January 2015	"Heavy Metal Show!"	16.0%	1	
14	7 January 2015	"Christmas in Finland"	16.1%	1	
15	10 January 2015	"Upside-down Obstacle Course"	16.9%	1	
16	14 January 2015	"Celebration in Finland!"	13.8%	1	
17	17 January 2015	"Surprising Elimination in Finland"	17.0%	1	
18	21 January 2015	"Landing in London"	15.8%	1	
19	24 January 2015	"Pop Group!"	15.0%	1	
20	28 January 2015	"The Race Halts!"	14.0%	1	
21	31 January 2015	"Summary of Europe"	13.1%	1	
22	4 February 2015	"Costa Rica"	14.4%	1	
23	7 February 2015	"Tropical Warfare"	16.0%	1	
24	11 February 2015	"Animals of the Forest!"	15.8%	1	
25	14 February 2015	"Hammock and Harvest"	17.4%	1	
26	18 February 2015	"Dramatic Scavenging!"	15.6%	1	
27	21 February 2015	"Conquering Bolivia"	17.5%	1	
28	25 February 2015	"Shocking Mission!"	16.0%	1	
29	28 February 2015	"Shocking Elimination!"	16.6%	1	
30	4 March 2015	"The Bolivian Desert!"	14.9%	1	
31	7 March 2015	"Bolivian Soldiers!"	16.9%	1	
32	11 March 2015	"Who Will Reach the Finals"	10.5%	1	
33	14 March 2015	"Semifinals!"	15.1%	1	
34	21 March 2015	"Looking for Mother"	15.8%	1	
35	25 March 2015	"Semifinals!"	15.7%	1	
36	28 March 2015	"Grand Finale!"	22.6%	1	
37	1 April 2015	"Reunion"	9.3%	1	

=== Awards ===
In 2015, the season won an Israeli Academy of Film and Television Award for best reality program.
