= Duany =

Duany is a surname. Notable people with the surname include:

- Andrés Duany (born 1949), American architect, urban planner, and a founder of the Congress for the New Urbanism
- Claro Duany (1917–1997), Cuban baseball player
- Demetrio Castillo Duany (1856–1922), Cuban revolutionary, soldier, and politician
- Ger Duany (born 1978), South Sudanese actor and model based in the US
- Jorge Duany (born 1957), theorist on Caribbean transnational migration and nationalism
- Julia Aker Duany (born 1954), South Sudanese politician, educator, and activist
- Kueth Duany (born 1980), Sudanese-born basketball player living in the US
- Lelys Stanley Martinez Duany (born 1985), Cuban chess grandmaster
- Raúl Duany (born 1975), Cuban decathlete
- Ubaldo Duany (born 1960), Cuban athlete

== See also ==
- Duani
