= Duani =

Duani is a surname. Notable people with the surname include:

- Roni Duani (born 1986), Israeli singer, model, actress, television host, and entrepreneur
- Rami Duani (born 1987), Israeli footballer

== See also ==
- Duany
