= Julia Aker Duany =

- Born: 1954
- Alma mater: Indiana University Bloomington
- Children: Duany Duany, Nyagon Duany, Kueth Duany, Nok Duany, Bil Duany

Julia Aker Duany (born 1954) is a South Sudanese politician, educator, and activist.

== Biography ==
Julia Aker Duany was born in 1954, one of 32 children in village of cattle herders in Anglo-Egyptian Sudan. She married Wal Duany, a government finance minister and former resistance fighter in the First Sudanese Civil War, in 1972. During the Second Sudanese Civil War, they fled the country in 1984, settling in the United States in Bloomington, Indiana.

At Indiana University Bloomington, she earned a B.S. in social studies in 1987, an M.S. in international and comparative education in 1989, and a Ph.D. in higher education in 1999. Her PhD dissertation was Sudanese women and education: The struggle for equal access and participation.

Duany worked at IU's Vincent and Lin Ostrom Workshop in Political Theory and Policy Analysis and founded the South Sudanese Friends International in 1994. Julia Duany was a Fulbright Scholar at Makerere University in Kampala, Uganda in 2005.

Following the 2005 Comprehensive Peace Agreement, Duany returned to South Sudan to aid in its independence effort. She served as the first female undersecretary of parliamentary affairs. She also helped develop a program in 2014 to bring fourteen Sudanese women to the United States to earn master's degrees. In 2014, she became the vice chancellor of the John Garang Memorial University of Science and Technology in Bor. She served as the Undersecretary of the Ministry of Public Service and Human Resource Development from 2021 to 2023.

=== Personal life ===
Julia and Wal Duany had five children. They all played basketball for Bloomington High School North and received basketball scholarships to Division I schools. They are thought to be the first family to ever send five children to college on basketball scholarships:

- Duany Duany - University of Wisconsin Madison - Wisconsin Badgers men's basketball
- Nyagon Duany: Bradley University - Bradley Braves women's basketball
- Kueth Duany: Syracuse University - Syracuse Orange men's basketball
- Nok Duany: Georgetown University - Georgetown Hoyas women's basketball
- Bil Duany: Eastern Illinois University - Eastern Illinois Panthers men's basketball

== Bibliography ==
- Making Peace & Nurturing Life: A Memoir of an African Woman About a Journey of Struggle and Hope (2003)
