= Kueth Duany =

Sudanese basketball player (born 1980)

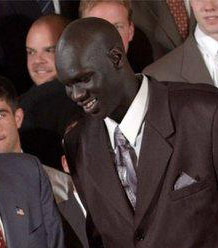

Personal information
- Born: April 22, 1980 (age 46) Sudan
- Listed height: 6 ft 6 in (1.98 m)
- Listed weight: 190 lb (86 kg)

Career information
- High school: Bloomington North (Bloomington, Indiana)
- College: Syracuse (1999–2003)
- NBA draft: 2003: undrafted
- Playing career: 2003–2006
- Position: Shooting guard / small forward

Career history
- 2003: Fayetteville Patriots
- 2004: Long Beach Jam
- 2005: Braunschweig
- 2005: Telekom Baskets Bonn
- 2005–2006: Tampereen Pyrintö
- 2006: Buffalo Silverbacks

Career highlights
- NCAA champion (2003)

Kueth Duany (born April 22, 1980) is a Sudanese-born American former basketball player. He played college basketball for the Syracuse Orange and was the captain and lone senior on Syracuse's 2003 NCAA National Championship team.

== Early years ==
Kueth Duany was born in Sudan to Julia Aker and Wal Duany on April 22, 1980.

Duany and his family escaped religious persecution in his native country of Sudan. Duany's father had been imprisoned for five months for the crime of being a Christian in government office.

Duany is one of five siblings, all of whom have played Division I basketball. Older brother Duany Duany made it to the 2000 Final Four with Wisconsin. Nyagon played for the women's team at Bradley, Nok played for the Georgetown women's team, and Bil played for the Eastern Illinois Panthers.

At Bloomington High School North, he helped his team to a combined 66-10 record in his three varsity seasons; his senior year, he averaged 19.5 points, 8.0 rebounds and 4.0 assists per game. Duany was a Nike All-American, as well as being named to the all-Conference, all-state, all-area and all-region teams.

== College ==
Duany sat out the 1998-99 season while recovering from knee surgery and was granted a medical redshirt.

After being used sparingly his freshman year, Duany averaged 3.5 points and 2.3 rebounds in 8.3 minutes a contest his sophomore year, scoring in double figures six times. As a junior, Duany started all 36 games, while averaging 7.2 points and 3.3 rebounds. Duany's best game came with career-high 14 points, 7 rebounds and five steals against Michigan State. He also earned All-Tournament mention at the Pre-Season NIT.

Duany was named captain his senior season, on a team that featured future NBA players, Carmelo Anthony and Hakim Warrick. Duany averaged 11.0 points and 3.7 rebounds while starting all 35 games. He also ranked fourth on the team in scoring and rebounding. Duany played an important role in Syracuse's march to the 2003 National Championship, registering 12 points and five rebounds against Auburn in the NCAA Tournament Sweet 16, and scoring 11 points on 4-for-6 shooting in the NCAA Tournament championship game against Kansas.

Duany finished his collegiate career ranked 42nd on Syracuse’s all-time scoring list with 1,084 career points. He played in 127 games spanning from 1999-2003, ending with career averages of 8.7 points and 3.9 rebounds per game.

== Professional career ==
Following graduation, Duany was taken with the sixth pick in the fifth round of the National Basketball Development League draft by the Fayetteville Patriots. He would appear in three games with the Patriots before being released on December 4, 2003.

Following his stint with Fayetteville, Duany briefly played for the Long Beach Jam in the ABA before playing overseas for Tampereen Pyrintö (Finland), Braunschweig (Germany) and Bonn (Germany). With Pyrintö, Duany started in 21 games and recorded 12.3 ppg and 6.4 rpg for the ninth placed team. He also played in the American Basketball Association for Long Beach.

On October 27, 2006, Duany signed a contract with the ABA's Buffalo Silverbacks. He appeared in nine games, averaging 18.9 points and 6.7 rebounds per game.

In April 2007, Duany joined the Indonesian national team in Jakarta to play in the SEABA Championships. Indonesia recruited him to bolster up their roster although Duany has no familiar links to the country.
