= Kuninkaanportti =

Entrance to Suomenlinna fortress in Helsinki, Finland

Coordinates: 60.140°N 24.990°E

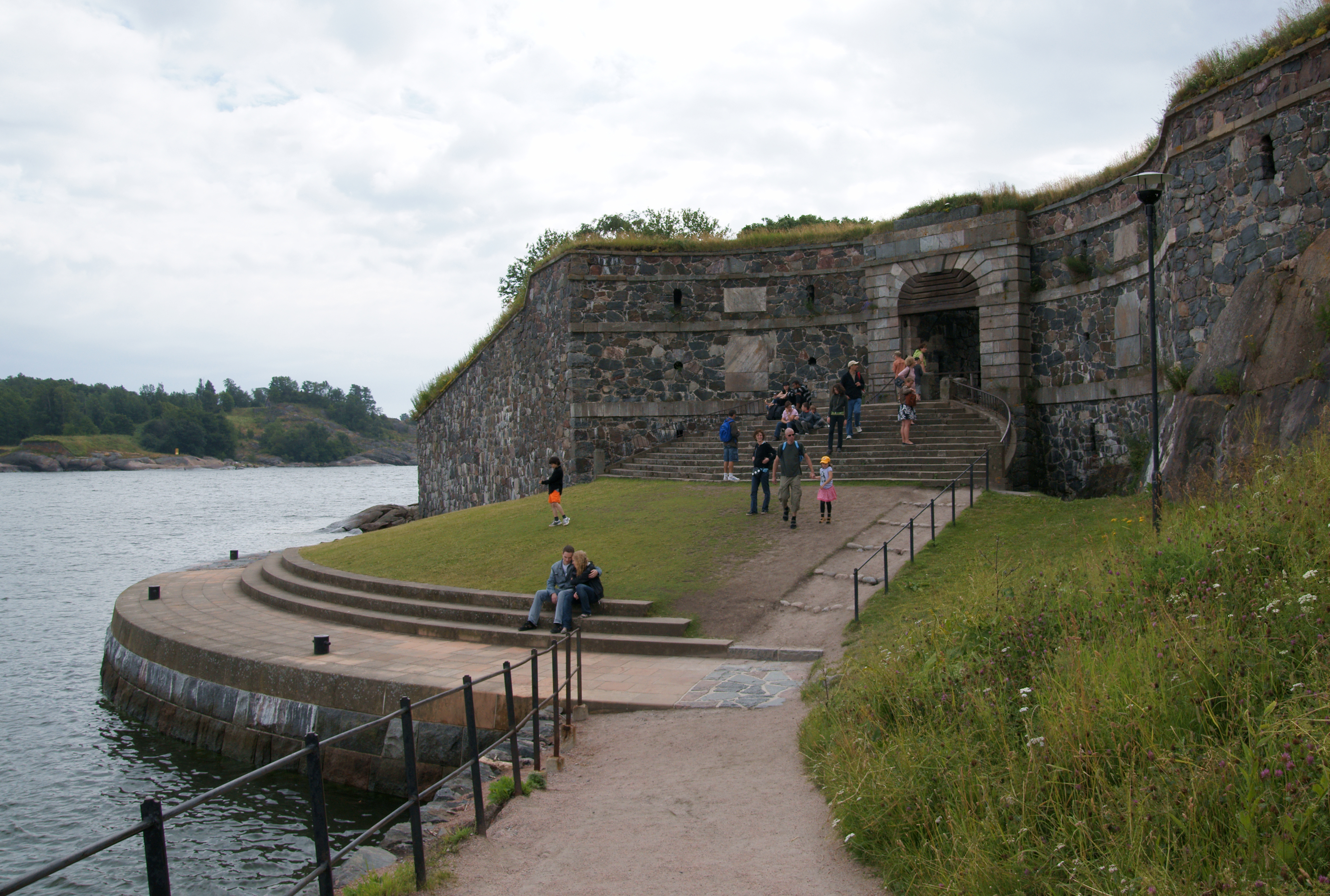
Kuninkaanportti

Kuninkaanportti or Kungsporten (lit. 'the king's gate' in Finnish and Swedish respectively) is the principal entrance to the Suomenlinna (Swedish: Sveaborg) fortress outside Helsinki. It is on the southernmost island of Suomenlinna, in front of the Kustaanmiekka strait, and is considered the main symbol of Suomenlinna.

The gate was constructed from 1753 to 1754 at the place where King Adolf Frederick of Sweden anchored his ship when he was coming to inspect the construction of the fortress. The name "the king's gate" comes from this event.

The gate is a typical fortress gate with cannon openings. There are wide steps leading to the gate, but in front of it is a drawbridge with a wide pit at both sides, to hinder climbing into the fortress.

The gate was featured on the 1000 Finnish mark note in the last series, from 1986 to 2001.

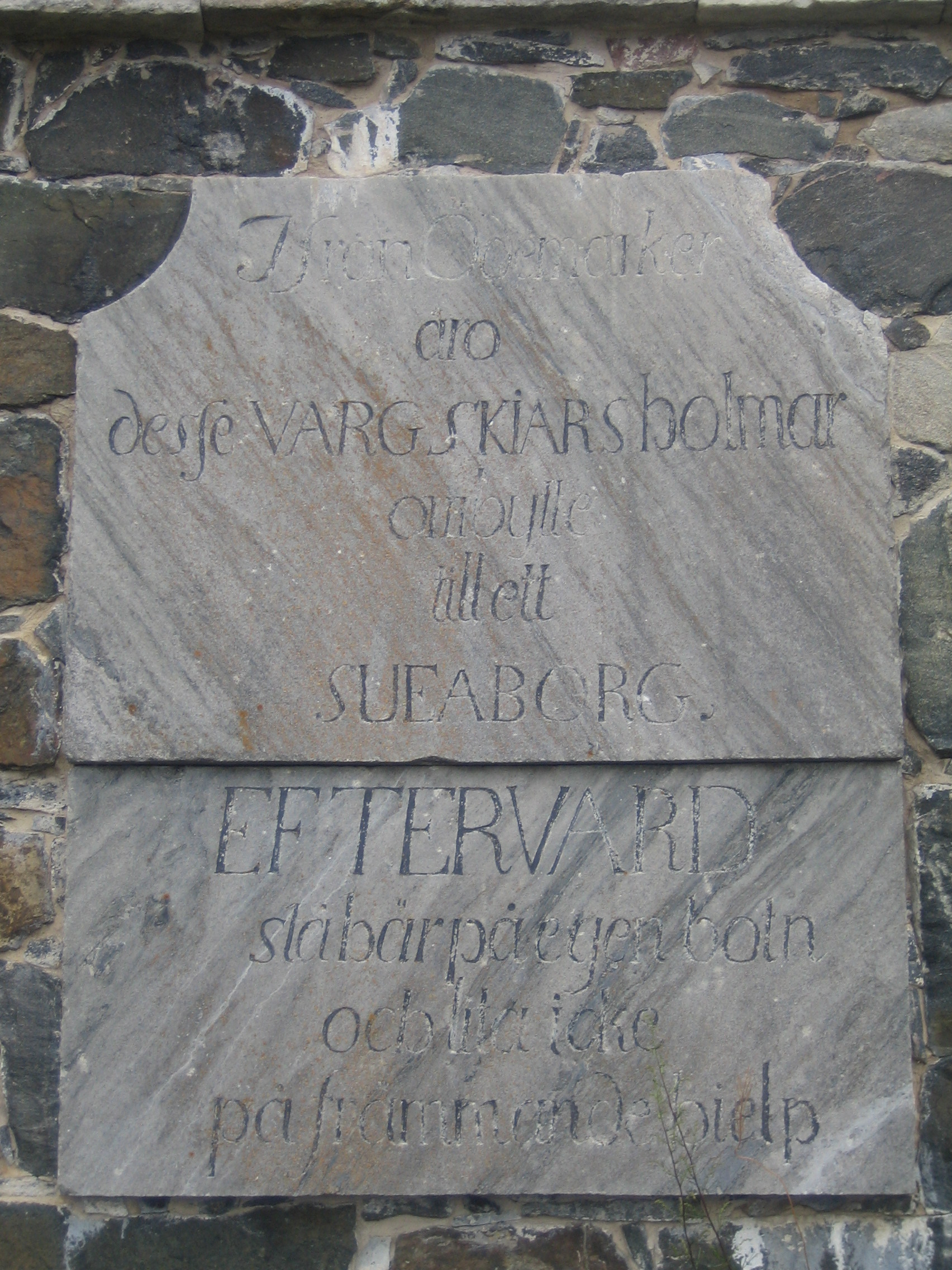
Augustin Ehrensvärd's inscription

As a decoration, the sides of the gate feature four stone tablets whose Swedish-language text written by the fortress's designer, Augustin Ehrensvärd, reads:

Här har konung Fredrik låtit läggs den första sten år 1748

Here laid King Frederick the first stone in the year 1748

Och konung Gustaf har lagt den sista sten år ..

And here laid King Gustav the last stone in the year .. (the year is left unwritten, because Gustav III never arrived to lay the last stone)

Sveaborg som rörer hafvet på den ena sidan och stranden på den andra, giver den kloke herravälde på både haf och land

Suomenlinna, which touches the sea on one side and the shore on the other, gives the wise control both on sea and on land.

Ifrån ödemarker äro desse Vargskiärsholmar ombytte till ett Sveaborg. Eftervard, stå här på egen botn, och lita icke på främmande hielp.

From desolate lands, these Wolf Islands have been transformed into a Suomenlinna. Progeny, stand here on your own foundation, and do not rely on foreign help.

— Augustin Ehrensvärd
