= Roni Duani =

Israeli pop singer

Roni Duani רוני דואני
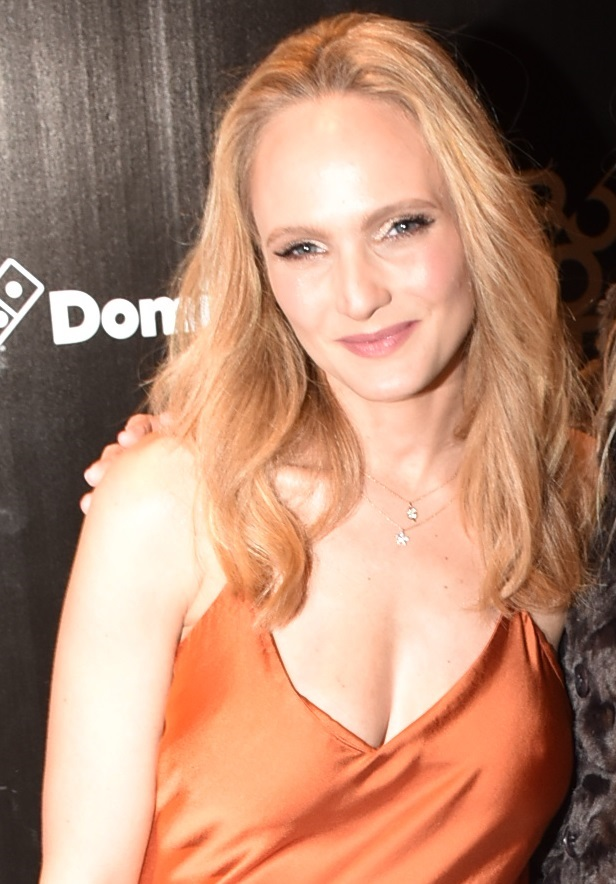
- Duani in 2019

Background information
- Also known as: Roni Superstar
- Born: Liron Duani; March 10, 1986 (age 40)
- Origin: Rishon LeZion, Israel
- Genres: Pop, Hebrew, dance
- Occupations: Singer; model; actress; television host; fitness instructor; entrepreneur
- Instrument: Vocals
- Years active: 2003–present
- Label: Helicon Records

Liron Roni Duani-Moncaz (Hebrew: רוני דואני; born March 10, 1986), formerly known by her professional name Roni Superstar (רוני סופרסטאר), is an Israeli pop singer, model, actress, television host, fitness instructor and entrepreneur. During her singing career, she was often compared to Britney Spears.

== Early life ==
She was born Liron Duani in Rishon LeZion, Israel, to Israeli-born parents of Ashkenazi Polish-Jewish descent and of Libyan Jewish descent. Her older sister, Yael Duani, is also a well-known Israeli actress. Duani attended her hometown's Gymnasia Realit high school.

She served as a soldier in the Israel Defense Forces from 2005 to 2007. She enrolled to the IDC Herzliya college in 2007, studying communication, and received her undergraduate degree in 2010.

== Career ==
=== Music and singing ===
In 2003, Duani was recognized for her debut album: The World Outside My Door. The album included a cover of Adam's 1987 hit song 'Sod' ('Secret'). She earned the nickname Roni Superstar as the album included the hit single "Superstar", based on British singer Jamelia's cover song "Superstar". About two months later, Roni did her mandatory army service. Around the same time, she released her second album Lo Otzeret, in two parts. This album contained the hit song "Adoni", composed and produced by the respected musician Ivri Lider.

In 2007, she released a dance lesson DVD called Al Ktzot HaEtzba'ot (On The Tip of the Toes), along with a new hit single, "Tzafuf" (Crowded). After the release of her DVD, Roni spent the next two years working on her third album, and did not do much in the public eye, except when she participated in the 2008 Festigal. However, she returned to public attention in January 2010, when she released the single "Lo Sham," the first song off her third album. To obtain publicity for this new single, she organized an ARG-type game with the help of a friend of hers, and the Israeli entertainment news website "Walla!" The game ended with the release of the single and the accompanying music video.

In May 2010, she released another single, "El Toch HaLayla", which was written by another Israeli singer Emily Karpel. She also recorded a version of this song in Chinese. In August 2010, Roni released her third single, "Ohevet, Ozevet." In an interview with the magazine Maariv LaNo'ar, Roni stated that her third album will not be released as an actual physical album but will continue to release singles on the Internet.

=== Television host ===
In addition to music, Roni has also done a lot of work in children's entertainment. For example, she is a frequent participant in the Festigal, a musical children's show that is performed by various Israeli celebrities every year around the Jewish holiday of Hanukkah. She first participated in 2004, where she performed the song "Nesichat Pop." This song was later released on her second album as a bonus song. Roni also participated in Festigal 2005, whose theme was "Giborei Al" (Hebrew for "superheroes"), and was about a boy who saves the world and becomes "Extreme Boy". She played a superhero named Beat Woman.

She performed in the 2008 Festigal, and participated in the 2010 show, playing Marie Antoinette. In addition to the Festigal, Roni has done many other stage shows for children. In 2006, she played Dorothy in a musical based on The Wizard of Oz. In 2009, she performed in another musical based on the movie Hercules. She has also made many television programs for children. In 2004, Roni joined the Israeli Nickelodeon network as a co-host one the shows Mastik, Achi Achoti, and Jungle. In 2007, she joined the cast of the children's show Rosh Gadol. In the summer of 2010, she became a co-host on the program HaMakom HaAmiti, which broadcasts on the Israeli television network "Arutz HaYeladim" (a children's channel).

Since 2019, she has hosted her own daily workout show on Sport 5 (Israel's Sports Channel), broadcasting from her own gym.

=== Modelling ===
From 2004 to 2007, she was a model for the Israeli swimsuit company Banana. Duani has also done modeling for the shoe company Converse, and the popular Israeli clothing store Castro. She also released a makeup/beauty care line for girls called U-Girl.

== Personal life ==
On August 19, 2010, she married her longtime boyfriend Chen Moncaz. On July 17, 2016, she gave birth to her first son, Nuri. In September 2019 she gave birth to her daughter, Maya. Roni and her husband own a fitness centre in Tel Aviv.

== Albums ==
=== Albums ===
Year	Album	Israel Certificate	Sales
2004	Olam Shalem Bachutz (The World Outside My Door)	Gold	25,000+
2005	Lo Otzeret I (Won't Stop Pt. I)	Gold	25,000+
2006	Lo Otzeret II (Won't Stop Pt. II)		

== Duets with other Israeli artists ==
- I Believe in You (lt. Maamina Becha) – Ha'Tzel (The Shadow) feat. Roni Superstar
- Elohim Sheli – with Harel Skaat
- Atid Varod Kmo Mastik – from the show "Mastik" (with Alon Litvak)
- Yesh Li Otcha
