= List of foreign football players in Israel =

This category is for non-Israeli footballers who currently play or have played in any of the Israeli leagues. The list includes also players that earned Israeli nationality during the years since being Jewish or marrying an Israeli wife.

== European ==
=== Albania ===
- Valon Ahmedi
- Adrian Aliaj
- Elis Bakaj
- Elvin Beqiri
- Henry Emenalo
- Jahmir Hyka
- Sabien Lilaj
- Viktor Paço
- Besnik Prenga
- Hamdi Salihi
- Erisildo Smaci

=== Armenia ===
- Hamlet Mkhitaryan
- Arthur Petrosyan
- Armen Shahgeldyan
- Yeghia Yavruyan

=== Austria ===
- Nico Antonitsch
- Sandro Gotal
- Lukas Spendlhofer

=== Azerbaijan ===
- Shahin Diniyev
- Aleksandr Zhidkov

=== Belarus ===
- Dmitry Antilevsky
- Andrey Astrowski
- Ivan Bakhar
- Syarhyey Hyerasimets
- Alyaksandr Karnitsky
- Yevgeni Kashentsev
- Georgi Kondratyev
- Vital Lyadzyanyow
- Denis Polyakov
- Ilya Shkurin
- Yuri Shukanov
- Maksim Skavysh
- Raman Vasilyuk

=== Belgium ===
- Samy Bourard
- Dylan Damraoui
- David Hubert
- Jérémie Luvovadio
- Pieter Mbemba
- Pieter Merlier
- Geoffrey Mujangi Bia
- Stéphane Oméonga
- Marvin Peersman
- Rubenilson
- Elisha Sam
- Dylan Seys
- Marc Van Der Linden
- Dries Wuytens

=== Bosnia and Herzegovina ===
- Semir Bajraktarević
- Jasmin Burić
- Edin Cocalić
- Enes Demirović
- Ibrahim Duro
- Sead Halilović
- Emir Hadžić
- Selver Hodžić
- Admir Hasančić
- Ivan Jolić
- Meho Kodro
- Haris Medunjanin
- Adi Mehremić
- Jasmin Mujdža
- Asmir Suljić
- Tino-Sven Sušić
- Adnan Zahirović
- Nedžad Žerić

=== Bulgaria ===
- Vladimir Andonov
- Krasimir Bezinski
- Krum Bibishkov
- Georgi Borisov
- Atanas Bornosuzov
- Nikolay Dyulgerov
- Plamen Galabov
- Viktor Genev
- Kostadin Hazurov
- Georgi Kostadinov
- Dimitar Makriev
- Ivaylo Markov
- Danail Mitev
- Atanas Pashev
- Martin Raynov
- Dimitar Telkiyski
- Igor Tomašić
- Elin Topuzakov
- Emil Velev
- Bozhidar Vasev
- Dimitar Rangelov

=== Croatia ===
- Michael Aničić
- Mario Babić
- Dražen Bagarić
- Tomo Barlecaj
- Mate Baturina
- Joško Bilić
- Miroslav Bičanić
- Elvis Brajković
- Karlo Bručić
- Jurica Buljat
- Tomislav Bušić
- Maks Čelić
- Mario Čižmek
- Marko Ćosić
- Antonini Čulina
- Tomislav Erceg
- Nino Galović
- Hrvoje Ilić
- Josip Ivančić
- Domagoj Kosić
- Filip Jazvić
- Vedran Ješe
- Igor Jovanović
- Hrvoje Kovačević
- Miljenko Kovačić
- Ivica Kulešević
- Mate Lacić
- Damir Lazek
- Siniša Linić
- Stipe Matić
- Mario Meštrović
- Goran Milanko
- Igor Mostarlić
- Antonio Mršić
- Arian Mrsulja
- Jasmin Mujdža
- Mario Musa
- Mirko Oremuš
- Mario Osibov
- Stipe Perica
- Nenad Pralija
- Miroslav Pejić
- Borimir Perković
- Ante Puljić
- Dejan Radonjić
- Darko Raic-Sudar
- Zoran Rajović
- Danijel Romić
- Giovanni Rosso
- Davor Rupnik
- Lorenco Šimić
- Luka Sindić
- Dino Škvorc
- Željko Sopić
- Damir Šovšić
- Dino Štiglec
- Robert Tezacki
- Igor Tomašić
- Dinko Trebotić
- Stefan Věrnaiş
- Branko Vrgoč
- Zlatko Čajkovski
- Silvije Čavlina
- Dario Zahora

=== Cyprus ===
- Savva Georgiou
- Andreas Karo
- Constantinos Soteriou

=== Czech Republic ===
- Ondřej Bačo
- Radovan Hromádko
- Přemysl Kovář
- Lubomír Kubica
- Jaroslav Ložek
- Tomáš Pekhart
- Pavel Pergl
- Tomáš Sivok
- Kamil Vacek
- Pavel Zavadil
- Martin Zeman

=== England ===
- Dennis Adeniran
- Jamie Hopcutt
- James Keene
- Junior Ogedi-Uzokwe

=== Estonia ===
- Sergei Hohlov-Simson
- Rauno Sappinen

=== Finland ===
- Mika Aaltonen
- Abba Gindin
- Matti Hiukka
- Haris Ibrahimovic
- Roni Porokara
- Janne Suokonautio
- Jani Viander
- Erfan Zeneli

=== France ===
- Georges Ba
- Cédric Bardon
- Julien Cétout
- Steven Cohen
- Pierre Cornud
- Siramana Dembélé
- Fabrice Fernandes
- Jordan Faucher
- Romain Habran
- Maxime Josse
- Yannick Kamanan
- Jared Khasa
- Brahim Konaté
- Jérôme Leroy
- Mickaël Marsiglia
- Johan Martial
- Teddy Mézague
- Carmelo Micciche
- Sacha Petshi
- Franck Rivollier
- Ibrahim Sangaré
- Vamara Sanogo
- Mohamadou Sissoko
- Amadou Soukouna
- Grégory Tadé
- Kevin Tapoko
- Xavier Tomas
- Mamadou Wagué

=== Georgia ===
- Giorgi Anchabadze
- Shota Babunashvili
- Giorgi Chelidze
- Giorgi Daraselia
- Davit Dighmelashvili
- Vladimir Dvalishvili
- Akaki Devadze
- Giorgi Demetradze
- Givi Didava
- Giorgi Gabedava
- Giorgi Gabidauri
- Iuri Gabiskiria
- Giorgi Gakhokidze
- Irakli Geperidze
- Kakhaber Gogichaishvili
- Revaz Gotsiridze
- Paata Gudushauri
- Levan Khmaladze
- Levan Khomeriki
- Nika Khorkheli
- Saba Khvadagiani
- Georgi Kipiani
- Davit Kizilashvili
- Levan Kutalia
- Zurab Menteshashvili
- Gela Panchulidze
- Amiran Mujiri
- Klimenti Tsitaishvili
- Irakli Zoidze

=== Germany ===
- Erich Berko
- Manuel Bölstler
- Florian Hartherz
- Marcel Heister
- Tim Heubach
- Francis Kioyo
- Christopher Mandiangu
- Julian Reinard
- Elia Soriano

=== Gibraltar ===
- Liam Walker

=== Greece ===
- Giannis Anestis
- Stefanos Athanasiadis
- Timis Bardis
- Dimitrios Diamantakos
- Andreas Gianniotis
- Sotiris Ninis
- Giannis Papadopoulos
- Thanasis Papazoglou
- Loukas Vyntra

=== Hungary ===
- István Emori
- Dénes Eszenyi
- Gábor Halmai
- István Hamar
- Ferenc Horváth
- Dávid Kelemen
- Mihály Korhut
- Márk Koszta
- Gábor Marton
- Géza Mészöly
- István Pisont
- István Salloi
- Vilmos Sebők
- Tamás Sándor
- Ádám Vezér
- Zoltán Végh
- László Czéh
- Viktor Mundi
- Tibor Sallai
- Tibor Balogh
- Tamás Priskin
- Janos Tomka
- Győrgy Veber
- Richárd Vernes
- Zoltan Nagy

=== Iceland ===
- Hólmar Örn Eyjólfsson
- Viðar Örn Kjartansson

=== Italy ===
- Cristian Battocchio
- Lorenzo Paramatti
- Davide Petrucci

=== Kazakhstan ===
- Vladimir Niederhaus
- Artur Shushenachev

=== Kosovo ===
- Enis Alushi
- Florent Hasani
- Alban Pnishi
- Astrit Selmani

=== Latvia ===
- Andrejs Prohorenkovs
- Mihails Zemļinskis

=== Lithuania ===
- Džiugas Bartkus
- Martynas Dapkus
- Edvinas Girdvainis
- Kęstutis Ivaškevičius
- Tadas Kijanskas
- Arvydas Novikovas
- Mindaugas Panka
- Robertas Poškus
- Eimantas Poderis
- Darvydas Šernas
- Ernestas Šetkus
- Domantas Šimkus
- Vyacheslav Sukristov
- Nerijus Valskis
- Emilijus Zubas
- Raimondas Žutautas
- Irmantas Zelmikas

=== Malta ===
- Joseph Mbong

=== North Macedonia ===
- Marko Alchevski
- Igor Gjuzelov
- Boban Grnčarov
- Georgi Hristov
- Igor Jančevski
- Igor Mitreski
- Risto Mitrevski
- Žarko Serafimovski
- Stefan Spirovski
- Milan Stojanovski
- Vančo Trajanov
- Miroslav Vajs

=== Moldova ===
- Igor Andronic
- Serghei Clescenco
- Artur Crăciun
- Radu Gînsari
- Igor Kostrov
- Nichita Moțpan
- Ion Nicolaescu
- Alexandru Suharev

=== Montenegro ===
- Fatos Bećiraj
- Aleksandar Boljević
- Đorđije Ćetković
- Stefan Denković
- Nikola Drinčić
- Duško Đurišić
- Vladimir Gluščević
- Deni Hočko
- Marko Janković
- Dragoslav Jevrić
- Boris Kopitović
- Žarko Korać
- Ilija Martinović
- Stefan Milošević
- Savo Pavićević
- Aleksandar Šćekić
- Marko Simić

=== Netherlands ===
- Elton Acolatse
- Tyre Asante
- Jelle Duin
- Erik Hroliken
- Glynor Plet
- Daniël de Ridder
- John de Wolf
- Etiënne Reijnen
- Godfried Roemeratoe
- Fabian Sporkslede
- Kevin Tano
- Arsenio Valpoort
- Kellian van der Kaap
- Piet Velthuizen

=== Norway ===
- Akinshola Akinyemi
- Fitim Azemi

=== Poland ===
- Jarosław Araszkiewicz
- Jarosław Bako
- Jerzy Brzęczek
- Marcin Cabaj
- Tomasz Cebula
- Marek Citko
- Dariusz Dźwigała
- Dariusz Jackiewicz
- Piotr Jegor
- Remigiusz Jezierski
- Bogdan Jóźwiak
- Jerzy Kapias
- Patryk Klimala
- Juliusz Kruszankin
- Andrzej Kubica
- Mariusz Kuras
- Damian Łukasik
- Stefan Machaj
- Radosław Majdan
- Radosław Michalski
- Kazimierz Moskal
- Karol Niemczycki
- Mariusz Niewiadomski
- Ludovic Obraniak
- Szymon Sawala
- Tomasz Sokołowski I
- Mateusz Stąporski
- Łukasz Surma
- Grzegorz Szamotulski
- Bartosz Tarachulski
- Grzegorz Wędzyński
- Marcin Włodarczyk

=== Portugal ===
- Bernardo Vasconcelos
- Tiago Costa
- Ricardo Fernandes
- André Geraldes
- Kiko Bondoso
- Rui Lima
- Hélder Lopes
- Bruno Luz
- André Martins
- Rúben Micael
- Jorge Teixeira
- Josué
- Josué Sá
- Miguel Silva
- Bruno Pinheiro
- Orlando Sá
- Adrien Silva
- David Simão
- Afonso Taira
- André Teixeira
- Diogo Verdasca
- Rafael Victor
- Miguel Vítor

=== Republic Of Ireland ===
- Cillian Sheridan

=== Romania ===
- Florin Achim
- Angelo Alistar
- Liviu Antal
- Mihai Antal
- Bogdan Apostu
- Mircea Axente
- Marian Bâcu
- Ovidiu Bic
- Dan Bucșa
- Laurențiu Buș
- Claudiu Bumba
- Zeno Bundea
- Marian Calafeteanu
- Gheorghe Ceaușilă
- Marius Cheregi
- Ovidiu Cuc
- Vitalie Damașcan
- Cristian Dănălache
- Cristian Daminuţă
- Daniel Dumitrescu
- Adrian Găman
- Gabriel Giurgiu
- Adrian Grigoruţă
- Dorin Goga
- Ion Goanță
- Ovidiu Hoban
- Adrian Hurdubei
- Costel Lazăr
- Gheorghe Liliac
- Dănuţ Lupu
- Andrei Lungu
- Ioan Marcu
- Alin Minteuan
- Lică Movilă
- Dănuț Moisescu
- Cătălin Necula
- Bogdan Nicolae
- Robert Niță
- Emil Ninu
- Marian Pană
- Corneliu Papură
- Dănuţ Perjă
- Mihai Pintilii
- Adrian Pitu
- Florin Purece
- Alexandru Răuță
- Mihai Roman
- Alin Rus
- Cristian Sârghi
- Daniel Scînteie
- Antonio Sefer
- Dorin Semeghin
- Costel Solomon
- Ilie Stan
- Adrian Ungur
- Gabriel Tamaș
- Viorel Tănase
- Valentin Teodorica
- Marius Todericiu
- Eugen Trică
- Constantin Vizonic
- Gabriel Vochin
- Mihai Voduț
- Samir Zamfir

=== Russia ===
- Georgi Batyayev
- Sergei Borodin
- Sergey Dmitriev
- Stanislav Dubrovin
- Vladimir Grechnev
- Vasili Ivanov
- Valeri Kleimyonov
- Sergei Kolotovkin
- Aleksei Kosolapov
- Mykola Kudrytsky
- Oleg Malyukov
- Boris Matveyev
- Murad Megamadov
- Vyacheslav Melnikov
- Grigori Morozov
- Ruslan Nigmatullin
- German Onugkha
- Mikhail Osinov
- Sergei Podpaly
- Zaur Sadayev
- Dzhabrail Kadiyev
- Aleksandr Podshivalov
- Aleksandr Polukarov
- Dmitri Popov
- Magomed-Shapi Suleymanov
- Aleksey Shchigolev
- Andrey Tikhonov
- Dmitri Ulyanov
- Aleksandr Uvarov
- Oleg Yelyshev

=== Scotland ===
- Alastair Reynolds
- Clark Robertson

=== Serbia ===
- Marko Adamović
- Nenad Adamović
- Miodrag Anđelković
- Milan Bojović
- Lazar Ćirković
- Nikola Ćirković
- Srđan Čolaković
- Nenad Cvetković
- Aleksandar Davidov
- Darko Drinić
- Nikola Gulan
- Dejan Ilić
- Ivica Iliev
- Saša Ivković
- Dragoslav Jevrić
- Branislav Jovanović
- Đorđe Jovanović
- Lazar Jovanović
- Marko Jovanović
- Aleksandar Jović
- Filip Knežević
- Vladimir Kožul
- Nemanja Ljubisavljević
- Matija Ljujić
- Milan Makarić
- Nenad Markičević
- Marko Markovski
- Milan Martinović
- Dušan Matović
- Branko Mihajlović
- Svetozar Mijin
- Nikola Mitrović
- Miljan Mrdaković
- Fejsal Mulić
- Uroš Nikolić
- Nemanja Petrović
- Bogdan Planić
- Miloš Radivojević
- Predrag Rajković
- Aleksandar Rakić
- Bojan Šaranov
- Aleksandar Šarić
- Branko Savić
- Zlatan Šehović
- Slobodan Simović
- Aleksandar Stanisavljević
- Slaviša Stojanović
- Vladimir Stojković
- Nikola Valentić
- Stefan Vilotić
- Nemanja Vučićević
- Ivan Vukomanović
- Igor Zlatanović

=== Slovakia ===
- Stanislav Angelovič
- Martin Fěşko
- Tomáš Košický
- Jozef Kostelník
- Jaroslav Mihalik
- Roman Pivarník
- Erik Sabo
- Jakub Sylvestr
- Július Szöke

=== Slovenia ===
- Miran Burgić
- Nastja Čeh
- Sebastjan Cimirotič
- Darko Djukič
- Damjan Gajser
- Primož Gliha
- Amer Jukan
- David Poljanec
- Vladimir Kokol
- Andrej Komac
- Darijan Matić
- Miha Mevlja
- Rene Mihelič
- Mitja Mörec
- Milan Osterc
- Alen Ožbolt
- Jalen Pokorn
- Ermin Rakovič
- Simon Sešlar
- Dalibor Stevanovič
- Luka Štor
- Klemen Šturm
- Sandi Valentinčič
- Adnan Zildžović

=== Spain ===
- David Aganzo
- Jorge Alonso
- Jair Amador
- Pablo Buendía
- Albert Crusat
- Carlos Cuéllar
- Isaac Cuenca
- Adrián Fernández
- Carlos García
- Gonzalo García
- Román Golobart
- Pablo González
- Luis Hernández
- Borja Herrera González
- Javi González
- Marc Fernández
- Cristian Hidalgo
- Pablo de Lucas
- Lillo
- Juan Pablo
- Mané
- Miguel Marcos Madera
- David Mateos
- Aitor Monroy
- Jorge Morcillo
- Sergio Novoa
- Abraham Paz
- Rubén Rayos
- José Rodríguez
- Jesús Rueda
- Enric Saborit
- Marc Valiente
- Míchel
- Jonathan Vila

=== Sweden ===
- Kristoffer Peterson
- Rade Prica
- Rasmus Sjöstedt
- Daniel Sundgren

=== Switzerland ===
- Nenad Savić
- Fabian Stoller

=== Turkey ===
- Kerim Frei

=== Ukraine ===
- Andriy Bal
- Serhiy Balanchuk
- Anton Bratkov
- Vladimir Bessonov
- Viktor Chanov
- Oleksandr Haidash
- Ivan Hetsko
- Serhiy Kandaurov
- Vasiliy Kardash
- Vitaliy Komarnitskyy
- Serhiy Konovalov
- Oleksandr Kosyrin
- Mykola Kudrytsky
- Oleh Kuznetsov
- Ruslan Liubarskyi
- Viktor Moroz
- Dmytro Mykhailenko
- Oleg Naduda
- Oleksandr Noyok
- Denys Onyshchenko
- Gennadiy Perepadenko
- Roman Pets
- Roman Pilipchuk
- Andriy Pylyavskyi
- Dmytro Ryzhuk
- Bohdan Sarnavskyi
- Oleksandr Stetsenko
- Yuri Tarasov
- Serhiy Tretyak
- Vadym Tyshchenko
- Ivan Yaremchuk
- Oleksandr Zhdanov
- Hennadiy Zhylkin

== African ==
=== Angola ===
- Evandro Brandão
- Dolly Menga
- Felício Milson
- Show

=== Benin ===
- Moïse Adiléhou
- Charlemagne Azongnitode
- Tony Toklomety

=== Burkina Faso ===
- Djakaridja Koné
- Issoumaila Lingane
- Dramane Salou

=== Cameroon ===
- Martin Atemengue
- Franck-Yves Bambock
- Rodrigue Bongongui
- Mohammed Djetei
- Yves Djida
- Emmanuel Emangoa
- Ernest Etchi
- Gaël Etock
- Jeando Fuchs
- Francis Kioyo
- Wato Kuaté
- Zome Louis
- Ernest Mabouka
- Cyril Makanaky
- Yannick Makota
- Georges Mandjeck
- Joslain Mayebi
- Aka Adek Mba
- Émile Mbamba
- Ariel Ngueukam
- David Nyengue
- Augustine Simo
- Patrick Suffo
- Bernard Tchoutang
- Dominique Wassi

=== Cape Verde ===
- Clé
- Heriberto Tavares

=== Central African Republic ===
- Habib Habibou
- David Manga

=== Chad ===
- Ezechiel N'Douassel

=== Côte d'Ivoire ===
- Stephane Acka
- Serge Ayeli
- Georges Ba
- Mohammed Bamba
- Zie Yohou Boris
- Didier Brossou
- Jonathan Cissé
- Souleymane Coulibaly
- Eugène Dadi
- Lassina Dao
- Joël Damahou
- Cheikh Mamadou Diabaté
- Mohammed Diallo
- Alfa Mamadou Diané
- Cédric Franck Don
- Abou Dosso
- Thierry Doubai
- Aboubacar Junior Doumbia
- Sékou Doumbia
- Souleymane Fofana
- Steve Gohouri
- Jean-Jacques Gosso
- Fernand Gouré
- Tchiressoua Guel
- Parfait Guiagon
- Koni Jakreta
- Yao Eloge Koffi
- Yaya Kone
- Kouya Mabea
- Doueugui Mala
- Yaya Meledje
- Ulrich Meleke
- Edgar Paul
- Moussa Sanogo
- Senin Sebai
- Ismaila Soro
- William Togui
- Aristide Benoit Zogbo

=== Congo DR ===
- Dylan Batubinsika
- Mbala Mbuta Biscotte
- Jordan Botaka
- Ngasanya Ilongo
- Branham Kabala
- Jean-Claude Kabeya Mukanya
- Éric Kabwe
- Hervé Kage
- Papi Kimoto
- Fabrice Lokembo-Lokaso
- Saïd Makasi
- Harrison Manzala
- Alain Masudi
- Nsumbu Mazuwa
- Kule Mbombo
- Camille Muzinga
- M'peti Nimba
- Tcham N'Toya
- Jeff Tutuana
- Ibbos Yuveladio

=== Republic of Congo ===
- Clévid Dikamona
- Ramaric Etou
- Bernard Onanga Itoua
- Paty Yeye Lenkebe
- Savity Lipenia
- Fernand Mayembo
- Leroy Mondzenga
- Yves Pambou
- Bryan Passi
- Mavis Tchibota

=== Gabon ===
- Paul Kessany
- Gilchrist Nguema
- André Biyogo Poko

=== Gambia ===
- Jarjue Abdoulie
- Pa Omar Babou
- Robert Badjie
- Abubakar Barry
- Hamza Barry
- Momodou Ceesay
- Joof Gaira
- Omar Gaye
- Tijan Jaiteh
- Ken Jammeh
- Sidiki Jawara
- Modou Jobe
- Njie Kabaha
- Ousman Marong
- Sulayman Marreh
- Ebou Sillah
- Kabba Sonko
- Bubacarr Tambedou
- Saikou Touray

=== Equatorial Guinea ===
- Juan Epitié
- Thierry Fidjeu-Tazemeta

=== Ghana ===
- Karim Abubakar
- David Acquah
- Ibrahim Abdul Razak
- Daniel Addo
- Henry Addo
- Ishmael Addo
- Sammy Adjei
- Kwabena Agouda
- Gideon Akuowua
- Samuel Alabi
- Aziz Ansah
- Eugene Ansah
- Latif Amadu
- William Amamoo
- Ibrahim Atiku
- Samed Abdul Awudu
- Emmanuel Banahene
- Osman Bashiru
- Ibrahim Bassit
- Emanuel Bentil
- James Bissue
- Richmond Boakye
- Derek Boateng
- Emmanuel Boateng
- Richard Boateng
- Yussif Chibsah
- Bernard Dong Bortey
- Godsway Donyoh
- Emmanuel Duah
- Mark Edusei
- Kweku Essien
- Mohammed Gado
- Richard Gadze
- Eric Gawu
- Edwin Gyasi
- Montari Kamaheni
- Kwame Karikari
- Laryea Kingston
- Gershon Koffie
- Francis Kyeremeh
- Derrick Luckassen
- Imoro Lukman
- Ebenezer Mamatah
- Philemon McCarthy
- Alfred Mensah
- Joseph Mensah
- Nelson Mensah
- Adamu Mohammed
- Abdul Zakaria Mugees
- Divine Naah
- Cletus Nombil
- Issac Nortey
- Stephen Ofei
- Peter Ofori-Quaye
- Okocha
- Prince Okraku
- Ransford Osei
- Seth Kwaku Osei
- Leonard Owusu
- John Paintsil
- Emmanuel Pappoe
- Isaac Pappoe
- Elvis Sakyi
- Joseph Tachie
- Ibrahim Tanko
- Patrick Twumasi
- Charles Vardis
- Abubakari Yahuza
- Samuel Yeboah

=== Guinea ===
- Mohamed Aly Camara
- Pathé Bangoura
- Sékou Tidiany Bangoura
- Hadji Barry
- Demba Camara
- Kémoko Camara
- Abdoulaye Cissé
- Kerfala Cissoko
- Sékou Condé
- Antoine Conte
- Ibrahima Conté
- Keita Karamokoba
- Alhassane Keita
- Kamso Mara
- Richard Soumah
- Seydouba Soumah
- Mohamed Kalil Traoré

=== Guinea Bissau ===
- Francisco Júnior
- Dionísio Fernandes Mendes
- Toni Gomes
- João Jaquité
- Sambinha

=== Kenya ===
- Jamal Mohammed
- Patrick Osiako

=== Liberia ===
- Amos Kollie
- George Baysah
- Victor Carr
- Prince Daye
- Patrick Doeplah
- George Gebro
- Dulee Johnson
- Mohammed Kamara
- James Koko Lomell
- Allen Njie
- Terrence Tisdell
- David Tweh

=== Madagascar ===
- Anicet Abel
- Jean Marcelin

=== Mali ===
- Moussa Bagayoko
- Saliou Guindo
- Djibril Sidibé
- Issouf Sissokho

=== Mauritius ===
- Willy Vincent

=== Niger ===
- Koffi Dan Kowa
- Moussa Maâzou
- Ali Mohamed
- Yussif Moussa

=== Nigeria ===
- Aliyu Adam
- Adeleke Adekunle
- Jerry Akose
- Sodiq Atanda
- Najib Yussuf Abdul
- Omar Abdul Aziz
- Ismail Abdul Razak
- Oluwasegun Abiodun
- Olubayo Adefemi
- Adebayo Adeleye
- James Adeniyi
- William Agada
- Olomuyiva Aganun
- Edith Agoye
- Dele Aiyenugba
- Goodness Ajayi
- George Akpabio
- Steven Alfred
- Michael Amanga
- Efe Ambrose
- Austin Amutu
- Izuchukwu Anthony
- Eugene Ansah
- Sunday Ayumi
- Magalan Ugochukwu Awala
- Taye Babalola
- Aliko Bala
- Fortune Bassey
- Marcus Bastos
- Yero Bello
- John Chibuike
- George Datoru
- Emmanuel Ebiede
- Anderson Ebimo West
- Ekigho Ehiosun
- Austin Ejide
- Eric Ejiofor
- Caleb Ekwenugo
- Blessing Eleke
- Evo Ememe
- Michael Emenalo
- Vincent Enyeama
- Anthony Eviparker
- Odeni George
- Fred Friday
- Ezekiel Henty
- Bruno Ibeh
- Shuaibu Ibrahim
- Goodnews Igbokwe
- Nosa Igiebor
- Harmony Ikande
- Philip Ipole
- Ibraheem Jabaar
- Ekundayo Jayeoba
- Benjamin Kuku
- Pascal Kondaponi
- Anthony Lukusa
- Henry Makinwa
- Odah Marshall
- Chimezie Mbah
- Ibrahim Muhammad
- Lawrence Nicholas
- Jacob Njoku
- Joseph Nwafor
- Anthony Nwakaeme
- Peter Nworah
- Jude Nworuh
- Atonye Nyingifa
- Nathan Oduwa
- Chikeluba Ofoedu
- Ibezito Ogbonna
- John Ogu
- Uche Okafor
- Michael Olaha
- Aaron Samuel Olanare
- Peter Olawale
- Thompson Oliha
- Michael Omoh
- Harrison Omoko
- Sunny Omoregie
- Peter Onyekachi
- Femi Opabunmi
- Bede Osuji
- Patrick Ovie
- Sunday Rotimi
- Uche Sherif
- Hamed Sholaja
- Stephen Sunday
- Samson Siasia
- Gavi Thompson
- Michael Tukura
- Muhammed Usman
- Ikouwem Utin
- Ugwu Uzochukwu
- Yakubu

=== Rwanda ===
- Saïd Makasi

=== Senegal ===
- Olivier Boissy
- Issa Cissokho
- Romuald da Costa
- Cheikh Gadiaga
- Moussa Konaté
- Ablaye Mbengue
- Seydiba Mendes
- Abdoulaye Seck
- Gora Tall
- Mamadou Touré Thiam
- Boubacar Traorè

=== Sierra Leone ===
- Alpha Conteh
- Kwame Quee
- Emmanuel Samadia

=== South Africa ===
- Thembinkosi Fanteni
- Bevan Fransman
- Tsepo Masilela
- Mihlali Mayambela
- Dino Ndlovu
- Siyabonga Nkosi
- Zama Rambuwane
- Siyanda Xulu

=== Swaziland ===
- John Mdluli

=== Tanzania ===
- Novatus Dismas

=== Togo ===
- Eric Akoto
- Arafat Djako
- Didier Kougbenya
- Emmanuel Mathias

=== Uganda ===
- Timothy Awany
- Fahad Bayo
- Aziz Kayondo
- Luwagga Kizito

=== Zambia ===
- Lameck Banda
- Evans Kangwa
- Kings Kangwa
- Kelvin Kapumbu
- Francis Kasonde
- Rodgers Kola
- Conlyde Luchanga
- Emmanuel Mayuka
- Emmanuel Mbola
- Richard Ngoma
- William Njovu
- Chaswe Nsofwa
- Ngosa Sunzu
- Gift Prosper Mphande
- Fwayo Tembo
- Junstine Zulu

=== Zimbabwe ===
- Wilfred Mugeyi
- Energy Murambadoro

== South American ==
=== Argentina ===
- Andrés Ricardo Aimar
- Hector Almandoz
- Pablo Bastianini
- Christian Berera
- Pablo Brandán
- Ignacio Canuto
- Roberto Colautti
- Diego Crosa
- Pablo del Rio
- Cristian Fabbiani
- Dario Fernandez
- Gustavo Fuentes
- Marcos Galarza
- Nicolás Gorobsov
- Guillermo Israilevich
- Pedro Joaquín Galván
- Oscar Garré
- Bryan Gerzicich
- Alejandro Kenig
- René Lima
- Fernando Lorefice
- Franco Mazurek
- Marcelo Meli
- Beto Naveda
- Carlos Olaran
- Víctor Ormazábal
- Javier Páez
- Fabio Pieters
- Gastón Sangoy
- Óscar Scarione

=== Brazil ===
- Abedi
- Allyson
- André Caldeira
- Adilson Bahia
- Roger Bernardo
- Bianor
- Gustavo Boccoli
- Breitner Morte de Carvalho
- Bruno Andrade
- Bruno
- Bruno Reis
- Bryan
- Cadu
- Caio
- Jefisley André Caldeira
- Capone
- Claudemir
- Claudir
- Daniel
- Danilo
- David Gomez
- Marcelo Toscano
- Marcus Diniz
- Dos Santos
- Douglas da Silva
- Dudu Cearense
- Eduardo Marques
- Elivelto
- Fábio Júnior
- Fabrício
- Fabrício Silva Dornellas
- Daniel Farias
- Farley
- Bernardo Frizoni
- Gabriel Lima
- Mateus Lima
- Gabriel Santos
- Gian
- Georginho
- Lucas Gaúcho
- Guti
- Heidor
- Humberto Foguinho
- Indio
- Léo Índio
- Joeano
- José Duarte
- Josue Gomes
- Júlio César
- Julio César da Silva
- Leandro
- Leandro Costa Miranda Moraes
- Leandro Simioni
- Lira
- Luanderson
- Lucas Salinas
- Jonatan Lucca
- Maicon
- Lúcio Maranhão
- Marcelo
- Márcio Giovanini
- Marcos Paulo Alves
- Marquinhos
- Matheusinho
- Mauricio
- Gustavo Marmentini
- Nivaldo
- Paulinho
- Pedro Sass
- Rafael Jataí
- Renan
- Rodrigo António
- Romário Pires
- Ramalho
- Ramon
- Renato
- Rômulo
- Farley Vieira Rosa
- Rubenilson
- Santos Washington
- Schwenck
- Lucas Serafim
- Silas
- Siston
- Juliano Spadacio
- Bruno Soares
- Tales Schutz
- Michael Thuíque
- Tiago Dutra
- Tuto
- Higor Vidal
- Wanderson
- Wellington
- Wescley Gonçalves
- Wigor
- William Soares
- Xavier
- Xavier Dirceu
- Willie

=== Bolivia ===
- Carlos Arias
- Luis Alberto Gutiérrez
- Miguel Hoyos
- Ronald Raldes
- Henry Vaca
- Guillermo Vizcarra

=== Chile ===
- Cristián Álvarez
- Mauricio Aros
- Pedro Campos
- Rodrigo Goldberg
- Manuel Iturra
- Milovan Mirosevic
- Manuel Neira
- Rafael Olarra
- Sebastián Rozental

=== Colombia ===
- Jonathan Agudelo
- Danilo Asprilla
- Jorge López Caballero
- Yair Castro
- Carlos Ceballos
- Gustavo Chará
- John Jairo Culma
- Iván Garrido
- Oswaldo Henríquez
- Deinner Quiñones
- Carlos Rivas

=== Ecuador ===
- Marlon de Jesús
- Jean Quiñónez

=== Paraguay ===
- Aldo Adorno
- Jorge Brítez
- Roberto Fabian Sanchez Doldan
- Dante López
- Santiago Ocampos

=== Peru ===
- Jair Céspedes
- Miguel Cevasco
- Paolo de la Haza
- Junior Viza

=== Uruguay ===
- Sebastián Abreu
- Edgardo Adinolfi
- Cristian González Aidinovich
- Martín Alaniz
- Joe Bizera
- Gary Kagelmacher
- Claudio Milar
- Claudio Rivero
- Felipe Jorge Rodríguez

=== Venezuela ===
- Carlos Espinoza
- Josua Mejías
- Andrés Túñez
- Freddy Vargas

== Central America and Caribbean ==
=== Costa Rica ===
- Rachid Chirino
- Mayron George
- Jimmy Marín
- Luis Marín
- Randy Ramírez
- John Jairo Ruiz

=== Curaçao ===
- Rangelo Janga
- Brandley Kuwas
- Darryl Lachman

=== Guadeloupe ===
- Mickaël Alphonse
- Yvann Maçon
- Ange-Freddy Plumain

=== Guatemala ===
- Nicholas Hagen

=== Guyana ===
- Morgan Ferrier
- Emery Welshman

=== Jamaica ===
- Peter Cargill
- Dennis Chin
- Paul Davis
- Maalique Foster
- Kevaughn Frater
- Dane Kelly
- Michael Seaton
- Newton Sterling

=== Martinique ===
- Johan Audel
- Jean-Sylvain Babin
- Rémi Maréval

=== Panama ===
- Abdiel Arroyo
- Alberto Blanco
- Omar Browne
- Davis Contreras
- Armando Cooper
- Armando Dely Valdés
- Freddy Góndola
- Eduardo Guerrero
- Cristian Martínez
- Alfredo Stephens
- Newton Williams
- Alberto Zapata

=== Suriname ===
- Tjaronn Chery
- Nigel Hasselbaink
- Touvarno Pinas
- Gleofilo Vlijter
- Roscello Vlijter
- Yanic Wildschut

=== Trinidad and Tobago ===
- Levi García
- Scott Sealy

== Asian ==
=== Australia ===
- Scott Higgins
- Nikita Rukavytsya
- Trent Sainsbury
- Ryan Strain

=== Japan ===
- Takuya Murayama

=== Kyrgyzstan ===
- Mirlan Murzaev

=== Turkmenistan ===
- Sergey Agashkov
- Valeri Broshin
- Andrei Zavyalov

=== Uzbekistan ===
- Igor Shkvyrin

== North American ==
=== Canada ===
- Tomer Chencinski
- Daniel Haber
- Milovan Kapor
- Tosaint Ricketts

=== Haiti ===
- Djimy Alexis
- Carnejy Antoine
- Frantzdy Pierrot

=== United States ===
- Hamisi Amani-Dove
- George Fochive
- Bryan Gerzicich

== Oceania ==
=== New Zealand ===
- Stefan Marinovic
