= List of 2008–09 Israeli football transfers =

The following is a list of transfers involving Israeli football clubs during the 2009–10 season.

== Bnei Sakhnin ==
=== In ===
- (Israel) Ahmed Saba - signed from (Israel) Hapoel Bnei Lod
- (Ghana) Bernard Dong Bortey - signed from (Ghana) Hearts of Oak
- (Republic of the Congo) Nsumbu Mazuwa - signed from (Israel) Hapoel Tel Aviv
- (Israel) Oshri Gita - signed from (Israel) Maccabi Haifa
- (Israel) Tal Hen - signed from (Israel) Hapoel Tel Aviv
- (Israel) Yaniv Luzon - signed from (Israel) Hapoel Petah Tikva

=== Out ===
- (Romania) Bogdan Apostu - free agent
- (Armenia) Ilya Yavruyan - signed for (Israel) Maccabi Tel Aviv
- (Israel) Islam Kana'an - signed for (Israel) Maccabi Ahi Nazareth
- (Colombia) John Jairo Culma - signed for (Israel) Maccabi Haifa
- (United States) Leonard Krupnik - signed for (Israel) Maccabi Haifa
- (Israel) Maor Buzaglo - signed for (Israel) Maccabi Tel Aviv

== Bnei Yehuda ==
=== In ===
- (Israel) Aviran Dalal - signed from (Israel) Hapoel Bnei Lod
- (Israel) Kfir Edri - signed from (Israel) Maccabi Herzliya
- (Israel) Kobi Moyal - on loan from (Israel) Beitar Jerusalem
- (Israel) Shai Nissim - on loan from (Israel) Beitar Jerusalem
- (Israel) Tomer Hemed - on loan from (Israel) Maccabi Haifa

=== Out ===
- (France) Cédric Bardon - signed for (Cyprus) Anorthosis Famagusta
- (Israel) Idan Malichi - signed for (Israel) Maccabi Petah Tikva
- (Ghana) Imoro Lukman - signed for (Cyprus) AEP Paphos
- (Israel) Nil Arbarbanel - signed for (Israel) Hakoah Ramat Gan
- (Israel) Salem Abu Siam - free agent
- (Israel) Yair Azulay - signed for (Israel) F.C. Ashdod
- (Israel) Ze'ev Haimovich - signed for (Israel) Maccabi Netanya

== Beitar Jerusalem ==
=== In ===
- (Argentina) Dario Fernandez - signed from (Greece) Panionios
- (Israel) Eliran Danin - back from (Israel) Maccabi Haifa
- (Israel) Moshe Ohayon - signed from (Israel) F.C. Ashdod
- (Israel) Oral Cohen - signed from (Israel) Hapoel Petah Tikva
- (Uruguay) Sebastián Abreu - signed from (Argentina) River Plate

=== Out ===
- (Israel) Gal Alberman - signed for (Germany) Borussia Mönchengladbach
- (Israel) Rômulo - signed for (Brazil) Cruzeiro
- (Israel) Sagi Strauss - signed for (Israel) Hapoel Nazareth Illit
- (Uruguay) Sebastián Abreu - signed by (Argentina) River Plate

=== Out on loan ===
- (Israel) Avi Reikan - on loan to (Israel) Hapoel Petah Tikva
- (Israel) Eytan Tibi - on loan to (Israel) F.C. Ashdod
- (Israel) Hen Azriel - on loan to (Israel) Hapoel Petah Tikva
- (Peru) Junior Viza - on loan to (Israel) Hapoel Petah Tikva
- (Israel) Kobi Moyal - on loan to (Israel) Bnei Yehuda
- (Israel) Shai Haddad - on loan to (Israel) Hapoel Ramat Gan
- (Israel) Shai Nissim - on loan to (Israel) Bnei Yehuda
- (Israel) Yonathan Zada - on loan to (Israel) Hapoel Kfar Saba

== F.C. Ashdod ==
=== In ===
- (Israel) Eitan Tibi - on loan from (Israel) Beitar Jerusalem
- (Israel) Moshe Ben Lulu - on loan from (Israel) Hakoah Ramat Gan
- (Israel) Yair Azulai - on loan from (Israel) Bnei Yehuda
- (Colombia) Carlos Ceballos - signed from (Israel) Maccabi Ahi Nazareth
- (Ghana) Kweku Essien - signed from (Ghana) Hearts of Oak

=== Out ===
- (Israel) Moshe Ohayon - signed for (Israel) Beitar Jerusalem

== Hakoah Ramat Gan ==
=== In ===
- (Israel) Amir Abu Arar - signed from (Israel) Maccabi Be'er Sheva
- (Cameroon) Ive Jeda - signed from (Israel) Hapoel Nazareth Illit
- (Israel) Nil Arbarbanel - signed from (Israel) Bnei Yehuda
- (Israel) Ofir Hemo - signed from (Israel) Ironi Rishon LeZion
- (Argentina) Alan Damian Bender - signed from (Argentina) Ferro Carril Oeste
- (Israel) Roman Haostov - signed from (Israel) Hapoel Marmorek
- (Israel) Sharon Gromanso - signed from (Israel) Ironi Ramat HaSharon
- (Israel) Tamir Por - signed from (Israel) Ironi Ramat HaSharon

=== Out ===
- (Israel) Ariel Weizman - free agent
- (Israel) Didi Ongar - signed for (Israel) Maccabi Petah Tikva
- (Israel) Hamudi Kiyal - free agent
- (Brazil) Jandson dos Santos - signed for (Israel) Maccabi Ironi Kiryat Ata
- (Argentina) Alan Damian Bender - free agent
- (Israel) Miki Atia - free agent
- (Israel) Moshe Ben Lulu - signed for (Israel) F.C. Ashdod
- (Israel) Raffi Cohen - signed for (Israel) Hapoel Ramat Gan
- (Brazil) William Soares - free agent

== Ironi Kiryat Shmona ==
=== In ===
- (Ghana) Kwabena Agouda - signed from (Israel) Hapoel Bnei Lod
- (Peru) Jair Céspedes - signed from (Peru) Universidad San Martín de Porres
- (Israel) Ohad Algarbli - signed from (Israel) Maccabi Ironi Kiryat Ata
- (Israel) Omer Peretz - signed from (Israel) Maccabi Tel Aviv
- (Israel) Yossi Betzalel - signed from (Israel)

=== Out ===
- (Israel) Maor Peretz - back (Israel) Hapoel Tel Aviv
- (Israel) Shavit Elimelech - signed for (Israel) Hapoel Petah Tikva
- (Israel) Wiyam Amashe - signed for (Israel) Maccabi Ahi Nazareth
- (Israel) Yossi Dora - signed for (Israel) Hapoel Haifa

== Hapoel Petah Tikva ==
=== In ===
- (Israel) Avi Reikan - on loan from (Israel) Beitar Jerusalem
- (Israel) Elnatan Salami - signed from (Israel) Maccabi Herzliya
- (Israel) Hen Azriel - on loan from (Israel) Beitar Jerusalem
- (Peru) Junior Viza - on loan from (Israel) Beitar Jerusalem
- (Ghana) Kone Jakarte - signed from (Israel) Hapoel Haifa
- (Israel) Nadiv Simantov - signed from (Israel) Hapoel Ra'anana
- (Israel) Shavit Elimelech - signed from (Israel) Ironi Kiryat Shmona

=== Out ===
- (Israel) Avi Peretz - free agent
- (Israel) Daniel Heidman - free agent
- (Israel) Lior Lansisky - free agent
- (Israel) Manor Hassan - free agent
- (Israel) Oral Cohen - signed from (Israel) Beitar Jerusalem
- (Democratic Republic of the Congo) Papi Kimoto - free agent
- (Israel) Yaniv Luzon - signed for (Israel) Bnei Sakhnin

== Hapoel Tel Aviv ==
=== In ===
- (Israel) Ben Luz - signed from (Israel) Hapoel Kfar Saba
- (Brazil) Douglas Da Silva - signed from (Israel) Hapoel Kfar Saba
- (Israel) Dudu Peles - back from (Israel) Hapoel Beer Sheva
- (Israel) Eran Zahavi - back from (Israel) Ironi Ramat HaSharon
- (Israel) Kfir Dar - signed from (Israel) Beitar Nes Tubruk
- (Israel) Maor Peretz - back from (Israel) Ironi Kiryat Shmona
- (Israel) Mahran Lala - signed from (Israel) Maccabi Ahi Nazareth
- (Ghana) Samuel Yeboah - signed from (Israel) Hapoel Kfar Saba
- (Israel) Yaniv Mizrahi - signed from (Israel) Beitar/Shimshon Tel Aviv

=== Out ===
- (Israel) Adi Sabag - free agent
- (Israel) Amar Mantzur - free agent
- (Israel) Baruch Dego - signed for (Israel) Maccabi Netanya
- (Brazil) Fábio Júnior Pereira - free agent
- (Israel) Galil Ben Sha'anan - signed for (Israel) Hapoel Haifa
- (Republic of the Congo) Nsumbu Mazuwa - signed for (Israel) Bnei Sakhnin
- (Israel) Shlomi Arbeitman - end of loan, destination still unclear
- (Israel) Tal Hen - signed for (Israel) Bnei Sakhnin
- (Turkey) Ümit Gonzalez - back to (Turkey) Fenerbahçe S.K.

== Maccabi Haifa ==
=== In ===
- (Colombia) John Culma - signed from (Israel) Bnei Sakhnin
- (United States) Leonard Krupnik - signed from (Israel) Bnei Sakhnin
- (Israel) Eyal Golsa - signed from (Israel) Beitar Nes Tubruk
- (Israel) Shlomi Arbeitman - back from (Israel) Hapoel Tel Aviv
- (Israel) Eden Ben Basat - back from (Israel) Hapoel Haifa

=== Out ===
- (Argentina) Diego Crosa - signed for (Argentina) Colón de Santa Fe
- (Israel) Eliran Danin - back to (Israel) Beitar Jerusalem
- (Croatia) Giovanni Rosso - signed for (Croatia) Hajduk Split
- (Brazil) Renato - free agent
- (Israel) René Lima - free agent

=== Out on loan ===
- (Israel) Oshri Gita - on loan to (Israel) Bnei Sakhnin
- (Israel) Tomer Hemed - on loan to (Israel) Bnei Yehuda
- (Israel) Tom Almadon - on loan to (Israel) Maccabi Ahi Nazareth

== Maccabi Netanya ==
=== In ===
- (Democratic Republic of the Congo) Alain Masudi - signed from (Israel) Maccabi Tel Aviv
- (Israel) Baruch Dego - signed from (Israel) Hapoel Tel Aviv
- (France) Gary Assous - signed from (France) AS Cannes
- (Israel) Ravid Gazal - signed from (Israel) Maccabi Tel Aviv
- (Israel) Shalev Menashe - signed from (Israel) Maccabi Herzliya
- (Israel) Ze'ev Haimovich - signed from (Israel) Bnei Yehuda

=== Out ===
- (Israel) Avi Strool - signed for (Belgium) K.S.C. Lokeren
- (Colombia) Jorge López Caballero - free agent

== Maccabi Petah Tikva ==
=== In ===
- (Israel) Didi Ongar - signed from (Israel) Hakoah Ramat Gan
- (Israel) Idan Malichi - signed from (Israel) Bnei Yehuda
- (Israel) Omer Buchsenbaum - signed from (Israel) Maccabi Herzliya
- (Argentina) Pablo Bastianini - Signed from (Venezuela) Caracas FC
- (Israel) Rotem Shemul - signed from (Israel) Hapoel Nazareth Illit
- (Israel) Yahav Yulezri - Signed from (Israel) Maccabi Haifa
- (Paraguay) Roberto Sanchez - signed from (Paraguay)

=== Out ===
- (Nigeria) Blessing Kaku - free agent
- (Georgia (country)) Irakli Geperidze - signed for (Israel) Hapoel Haifa
- (Serbia) Nenad Savić - free agent
- (Israel) Ohad Kadousi - signed for (Israel) Hapoel Be'er Sheva
- (Brazil) Xavier Dirceu - free agent
- (Israel) Dovev Gabay - free agent

== Maccabi Tel Aviv ==
=== In ===
- (Israel) Maor Buzaglo - signed from (Israel) Bnei Sakhnin
- (Israel) Guillermo Israilevich - signed from (Israel) Hapoel Kfar Saba
- (Bulgaria) Igor Tomašić - signed from (Bulgaria) Levski Sofia
- (Armenia) Ilya Yavruyan - signed from (Israel) Bnei Sakhnin
- (Armenia) Karlen Abramov - signed from (Uzbekistan) Navbahor Namangan
- (Liberia) Dulee Johnson - signed from (Sweden) AIK Fotboll

=== Out ===
- (Democratic Republic of the Congo) Alain Masudi - signed for (Israel) Maccabi Netanya
- (Israel) Amiran Shkalim - signed for (Israel) Hapoel Kfar Saba
- (Israel) Erez Mesika - signed for (Cyprus) AEK Larnaca
- (Uruguay) Joe Bizera - back to (Italy) Cagliari
- (Israel) Kobi Mussa - free agent
- (Israel) Omer Peretz - signed for (Israel) Ironi Kiryat Shmona
- (Israel) Ravid Gazal - signed for (Israel) Maccabi Netanya

== See also ==
- 2008–09 Israel State Cup
- 2008–09 Toto Cup Al
