= 2008–09 Israeli Premier League =

Israeli Premier League
- Season: 2008–09
- Dates: 30 August 2008 – 1 June 2009
- Champions: Maccabi Haifa; 6th Premier League title 11th top-flight title
- Runner up: Hapoel Tel Aviv
- Relegated: Hakoah Amidar Ramat Gan; Ironi Kiryat Shmona
- Champions League: Maccabi Haifa (second qualifying round)
- Europa League: Hapoel Tel Aviv (third qualifying round); Maccabi Netanya (second qualifying round); Bnei Yehuda (first qualifying round)
- Goals: 432
- Average goals/game: 2.18
- Top goalscorer: Barak Yitzhaki / Shimon Abuhatzira / Eliran Atar (14 goals)
- Biggest home win: Hapoel Tel Aviv 4–0 Beitar Jerusalem (9 February 2009); Beitar Jerusalem 4–0 Hakoah Ramat Gan (4 April 2009)
- Biggest away win: 8 games with a win by 3 goals^{[A]}
- Highest scoring: Hakoah Ramat Gan 2–4 Beitar Jerusalem (20 September 2008); F.C. Ashdod 4–2 Bnei Sakhnin (8 November 2008); F.C. Ashdod 3–3 Maccabi Netanya (20 December 2008) (6 goals)

The 2008–09 Israeli Premier League season began on 30 August 2008, and ended on 1 June 2009. Beitar Jerusalem were the defending champions, having won their 6th league title the previous year.

Two teams from Liga Leumit were promoted at the end of the previous season: Hakoah Amidar Ramat Gan and Hapoel Petah Tikva. The two teams relegated were Hapoel Kfar Saba and Maccabi Herzliya.

At a 24 June 2008 IFA administration meeting it was decided that the league would be expanded to 16 clubs for the following season. Due to the expansion, only one team was relegated directly to Liga Leumit, while five clubs were promoted. The eleventh-ranked team played in a play-off match against the sixth-ranked team from Liga Leumit.

Maccabi Haifa clinched their 11th title after a 0–2 win against Maccabi Netanya on 23 May 2009.

== Teams ==
Locations of the 2008–09 Israeli Premier League teams

Twelve teams took part in the 2008-09 Israeli Premier League season, including ten teams from the 2007-08 season, as well as two teams which were promoted from the 2007-08 Liga Leumit.

Hakoah Amidar Ramat Gan were promoted as champions of the 2007-08 Liga Leumit. Hapoel Petah Tikva were promoted as runners up. They both returned to the top flight after an absence of one season.

Hapoel Kfar Saba and Maccabi Herzliya were relegated after finishing in the bottom two places in the 2007-08 season.

=== Stadiums and Locations ===
Club	Stadium	Capacity
Beitar Jerusalem	Teddy Stadium	21,600
Bnei Yehuda	Bloomfield Stadium	15,700
Hapoel Tel Aviv	Bloomfield Stadium	15,700
Maccabi Tel Aviv	Bloomfield Stadium	15,700
Maccabi Haifa	Kiryat Eliezer Stadium	14,002
Hakoah Ramat Gan	Winter Stadium	8,000
Maccabi Netanya	Sar-Tov Stadium	7,500
F.C. Ashdod	Yud-Alef Stadium	7,800
Hapoel Petah Tikva	Petah Tikva Municipal Stadium	6,800
Maccabi Petah Tikva	Petah Tikva Municipal Stadium	6,800
Ironi Kiryat Shmona	Kiryat Shmona Municipal Stadium	5,300
Bnei Sakhnin	Doha Stadium	5,000

Beitar Jerusalem	Bnei Yehuda Hapoel Tel Aviv Maccabi Tel Aviv	Hakoah Ramat Gan
Teddy Stadium	Bloomfield Stadium	Winter Stadium
Maccabi Netanya	Maccabi Haifa	Hapoel Petah Tikva Maccabi Petah Tikva
Sar-Tov Stadium	Kiryat Eliezer Stadium	Petah Tikva Municipal Stadium
F.C. Ashdod	Bnei Sakhnin	Ironi Kiryat Shmona
Yud-Alef Stadium	Doha Stadium	Kiryat Shmona Stadium

=== Managerial changes ===
Team	Outgoing manager	Manner of departure	Date of vacancy	Position in table	Incoming manager	Date of appointment
Hapoel Ironi Kiryat Shmona	(Israel) Ran Ben Shimon	End of contract	1 June 2008	Pre-season	(Israel) Michele Dayan	1 June 2008
Maccabi Haifa	(Israel) Ronny Levy	End of contract	1 June 2008	Pre-season	(Israel) Elisha Levi	1 June 2008
Maccabi Netanya	(Israel) Reuven Atar	End of contract	1 June 2008	Pre-season	(Germany) Lothar Matthäus	1 June 2008
Bnei Sakhnin	(Israel) Elisha Levy	End of contract	1 June 2008	Pre-season	(Israel) Freddy David	1 June 2008
Maccabi Tel Aviv	(Israel) Nir Levin	End of contract	1 June 2008	Pre-season	(Israel) Ran Ben Shimon	1 June 2008
Bnei Yehuda	(Israel) Hezi Shirazi	End of contract	1 June 2008	Pre-season	(Israel) Freddy David	12 June 2008
Maccabi Petah Tikva	(Israel) Nitzan Shirazi	Resign	21 August 2008	Pre-season	(Israel) Guy Azouri	21 August 2008
Beitar Jerusalem	(Israel) Itzhak Shum	Sacked	3 September 2008	12th	(Israel) Reuven Atar	3 September 2008
Maccabi Tel Aviv	(Israel) Ran Ben Shimon	Sacked	2 November 2008	7th	(Israel) Avi Nimni	2 November 2008
Bnei Sakhnin	(Israel) Freddy David	Resign	9 November 2008	12th	(Israel) Eyal Lahman	9 November 2008
Hapoel Ironi Kiryat Shmona	(Israel) Michele Dayan	Sacked	30 November 2008	10th	(Israel) Eli Cohen	11 December 2008
Maccabi Petah Tikva	(Israel) Guy Azouri	Resign	22 December 2008	6th	(Israel) Ronny Levy	22 December 2008
Bnei Sakhnin	(Israel) Eyal Lahman	Sacked	8 March 2009	12th	(Israel) Eran Kulik	8 March 2009
Hapoel Ironi Kiryat Shmona	(Israel) Eli Cohen	Sacked	11 April 2009	12th	(Israel) Ran Ben Shimon	14 April 2009

=== Foreign players ===
Club	Player 1	Player 2	Player 3	Player 4	Player 5	Non-visa foreign	Former players
Beitar Jerusalem	(Argentina) Darío Fernández	(Chile) Cristián Álvarez				(Croatia) Tvrtko Kale^{2}	(Ghana) Derek Boateng (Uruguay) Sebastián Abreu
Bnei Sakhnin	(Colombia) **Sergio Novoa**	(Democratic Republic of the Congo) Paty Yeye Lenkebe	(Ghana) Awudu Okocha	(Ghana) **Ibrahim Basit**	(Guinea-Bissau) **Niche**		(Brazil) Maicon Santos (Democratic Republic of the Congo) Nsumbu Mazuwa (Ghana) Kweku Essien (Lithuania) Robertas Poškus
Bnei Yehuda	(Argentina) Pedro Galván	(Croatia) Hrvoje Kovačević	(Nigeria) Dele Aiyenugba	(Serbia) Milan Martinović	(Spain) Iván Garrido		
F.C. Ironi Ashdod	(Bosnia and Herzegovina) **Dragan Stojkić**	(Bulgaria) Dimitar Makriev	(Czech Republic) **Lubomír Kubica**	(Paraguay) **Silvio Borjas**	(Uruguay) Cristian González		(Brazil) Rogélio (Colombia) Carlos Ceballos (Poland) Grzegorz Szamotulski
Hakoah Amidar Ramat Gan	(Cameroon) **Joslain Mayebi**	(Nigeria) **Abdulkarim Lukman**	(Nigeria) **Joseph Nwafor**	(Nigeria) Michael Tukura			(Argentina) Alan Bender^{2} (Cameroon) Yves Djidda (Colombia) Carlos Ceballos (The Gambia) Ken Jammeh (The Gambia) Robert Badjie
Hapoel Petah Tikva	(Burkina Faso) Djakaridja Koné	(Democratic Republic of the Congo) M'peti Nimba	(Ghana) Stephen Offei	(Peru) **Jair Céspedes**	(Peru) Junior Viza	(Kazakhstan) Mark Gurman^{2}	(Ghana) Emmanuel Banahene
Hapoel Tel Aviv	(Brazil) Douglas da Silva	(Bulgaria) Dimitar Telkiyski	(Bulgaria) Elin Topuzakov	(Ghana) Samuel Yeboah	(Nigeria) Vincent Enyeama		
Ironi Kiryat Shmona	(Bolivia) **Luis Gutiérrez**	(Bulgaria) **Todor Kolev**	(Gabon) **Paul Kessany**	(Nigeria) **Yero Bello**	(Peru) **Miguel Cevasco**		(Brazil) Maicon Santos (Ghana) Abubakari Yahuza (Ghana) Kwabena Agouda (Peru) Jair Céspedes
Maccabi Haifa	(Colombia) Jhon Culma	(Ghana) **Ransford Osei**	(Nigeria) **Anderson West**	(South Africa) Thembinkosi Fanteni	(South Africa) Tsepo Masilela	(Brazil) Gustavo Boccoli^{1} (United States) Leonid Krupnik^{2}	
Maccabi Netanya	(Costa Rica) Luis Marín	(Panama) **Alberto Blanco**	(Panama) **Alberto Zapata**	(South Africa) Bevan Fransman	(South Africa) **Siyabonga Nkosi**		(Brazil) Humberto Foguinho (Cameroon) Francis Kioyo (Equatorial Guinea) Thierry Fidjeu (Ghana) Awudu Okocha (Ivory Coast) Georges Ba
Maccabi Petah Tikva	(Argentina) Pablo Bastianini	(France) Siramana Dembélé	(Georgia (country)) Irakli Geperidze	(North Macedonia) Boban Grnčarov		(Russia) Murad Magomedov^{1}	(Slovenia) Dalibor Stevanović
Maccabi Tel Aviv	(Bulgaria) Igor Tomašić	(Liberia) Dulee Johnson	(Serbia) Dragoslav Jevrić	(Trinidad and Tobago) **Scott Sealy**	(Zimbabwe) Emmanuel Mayuka	(Argentina) Guillermo Israilevich^{2} (Armenia) Yeghia Yavruyan^{1} (France) Jonathan Assous^{2} (United States) **Erik Hort**^{2}	(France) Rudy Haddad^{2} (France) Yannick Kamanan

In bold: Players that join the club mid-season

In Italic: Players that left the club mid-season

The following do not fill a Visa position:
^{1}Players who were born and started their professional career abroad but have since gained an Israeli passport or permanent residency, allowing them to play with Israeli status;
^{2}Players who were born and started their professional career abroad but are eligible for Israeli citizenship due to Jewish ancestry;

^{3}Israeli citizens who have chosen to represent another national team;

== League table ==
Pos	Team	Pld	W	D	L	GF	GA	GD	Pts	Qualification or relegation
1	Maccabi Haifa (C)	33	19	10	4	49	24	+25	67	Qualification for the Champions League second qualifying round
2	Hapoel Tel Aviv	33	17	10	6	49	28	+21	61	Qualification for the Europa League third qualifying round
3	Beitar Jerusalem (Note: Beitar Jerusalem did not obtain the license for competing in next year's European competitions because they failed to meet their commitments to UEFA. Since Beitar won the cup and the cup runners-up are league champions Maccabi Haifa, all Europa League spots were awarded to teams according to their league positions. Since Beitar also finished third in the league, Europa League spots were given to league runners-up Hapoel Tel Aviv, fourth-placed Maccabi Netanya and fifth-placed Bnei Yehuda.)	33	16	12	5	47	28	+19	57 (Note: Beitar Jerusalem were deducted two points due to Beitar fans pitch invasion the previous year against Maccabi Herzliya and one point due to racist calls from Beitar fans.)	
4	Maccabi Netanya	33	14	12	7	40	32	+8	54	Qualification for the Europa League second qualifying round (Note: Qualified because Beitar Jerusalem did not obtain the license for competing in next year's European competitions.)
5	Bnei Yehuda	33	14	7	12	38	31	+7	49	Qualification for the Europa League first qualifying round
6	Maccabi Tel Aviv	33	11	11	11	36	35	+1	44	
7	Maccabi Petah Tikva	33	8	15	10	26	33	−7	39	
8	F.C. Ironi Ashdod	33	10	8	15	41	48	−7	38	
9	Bnei Sakhnin	33	7	12	14	26	41	−15	33	
10	Hapoel Petah Tikva	33	8	7	18	30	42	−12	31	
11	Hakoah Amidar Ramat Gan (R)	33	6	11	16	26	46	−20	29	Qualification for the relegation play-offs
12	Ironi Kiryat Shmona (R)	33	6	9	18	24	44	−20	27	Relegation to Liga Leumit

Source: Israel Football Association
Rules for classification: 1st points; 2nd goal difference; 3rd matches won; 4th goals scored; 5th head-to-head; 6th decision match
(C) Champions; (R) Relegated

=== Positions by round ===
Team ╲ Round	1	2	3	4	5	6	7	8	9	10	11	12	13	14	15	16	17	18	19	20	21	22	23	24	25	26	27	28	29	30	31	32	33
Maccabi Haifa	1	2	2	2	2	1	1	1	2	1	1	1	1	1	1	1	1	1	1	1	1	1	1	1	1	1	2	1	2	1	1	1	1
Hapoel Tel Aviv	4	7	7	5	7	7	4	4	4	5	3	3	3	3	3	3	2	3	2	3	2	2	2	2	2	2	1	2	1	2	2	2	2
Beitar Jerusalem	12	12	6	7	9	9	6	9	7	4	6	6	6	4	4	5	4	4	4	4	4	4	4	4	3	3	3	3	3	3	3	3	3
Maccabi Netanya	6	1	1	1	1	2	2	2	1	2	2	2	2	2	2	2	3	2	3	2	3	3	3	3	4	4	4	4	4	4	4	4	4
Bnei Yehuda	10	8	11	11	12	11	12	10	11	12	10	9	8	9	7	7	6	5	5	6	5	5	5	5	5	5	5	5	5	5	5	5	5
Maccabi Tel Aviv	2	3	3	3	3	4	5	7	6	8	8	8	9	8	9	9	8	8	7	8	9	9	8	8	8	7	6	6	6	7	6	6	6
Maccabi Petah Tikva	5	4	4	4	4	3	3	3	3	3	4	4	5	6	6	4	5	6	6	5	6	6	7	7	7	6	7	7	7	6	7	8	7
F.C. Ironi Ashdod	11	5	8	9	8	8	9	8	5	7	5	7	7	5	5	6	7	7	8	7	7	7	6	6	6	8	8	8	8	8	8	7	8
Bnei Sakhnin	8	9	12	12	11	12	10	11	12	10	11	11	11	11	10	11	11	10	10	10	11	11	10	10	10	10	10	10	10	9	10	10	9
Hapoel Petah Tikva	7	10	5	8	6	5	7	5	8	6	7	5	4	7	8	8	9	9	9	9	8	8	9	9	9	9	9	9	9	10	9	9	10
Hakoah Amidar Ramat Gan	3	6	9	10	10	10	11	12	10	11	12	12	12	12	12	12	12	12	12	12	12	12	12	12	12	11	11	11	11	11	12	12	11
Ironi Kiryat Shmona	9	11	10	6	5	6	8	6	9	9	9	10	10	10	11	10	10	11	11	11	10	10	11	11	11	12	12	12	12	12	11	11	12

Source: Israel Football Association

== Results ==
The schedule consisted of three rounds. During first two rounds, each team played each other once home and away for a total of 22 matches. The pairings of the third round were then set according to the standings after first two rounds, giving every team a third game against each opponent for a total of 33 games per team.

=== First and second round ===
Home \ Away	BEI	BnS	BnY	ASH	HAR	HPT	HTA	IKS	MHA	MNE	MPT	MTA
Beitar Jerusalem	—	0–0	1–0	3–2	3–0	2–2	0–2	2–2	1–1	2–1	1–1	0–0
Bnei Sakhnin	0–0	—	0–2	0–2	0–1	0–3	1–0	1–0	0–1	0–1	2–1	2–3
Bnei Yehuda	0–3	2–0	—	1–0	2–2	1–0	3–0	0–1	0–1	1–1	1–0	3–2
F.C. Ironi Ashdod	1–2	4–2	0–2	—	3–2	4–1	1–0	2–0	1–3	3–3	1–1	1–0
Hakoah Amidar Ramat Gan	2–4	0–0	0–1	1–1	—	0–1	2–2	1–0	0–3	1–2	2–2	0–1
Hapoel Petah Tikva	0–2	1–1	1–0	2–1	1–0	—	0–2	3–0	1–4	0–0	0–1	0–1
Hapoel Tel Aviv	4–0	1–0	2–0	2–0	3–0	3–2	—	1–1	0–0	2–1	1–1	2–0
Ironi Kiryat Shmona	1–0	1–2	0–2	1–1	0–2	0–0	0–0	—	1–0	0–3	0–0	1–2
Maccabi Haifa	0–0	2–1	1–0	3–1	2–0	1–0	2–2	1–1	—	2–3	3–1	3–2
Maccabi Netanya	1–2	1–1	2–2	2–1	2–2	3–1	0–0	2–1	2–0	—	0–0	1–0
Maccabi Petah Tikva	0–1	1–0	0–0	2–3	1–0	2–1	1–1	2–1	2–0	1–1	—	0–0
Maccabi Tel Aviv	0–0	1–1	2–1	2–2	0–0	1–2	1–3	0–1	1–1	0–1	0–0	—

Source: Israel Football Association
Legend: Blue = home team win; Yellow = draw; Red = away team win.

=== Third round ===
Key numbers for pairing determination (number marks position after 22 games):

Rounds
23rd	24th	25th	26th	27th	28th	29th	30th	31st	32nd	33rd
3 – 12; 4 – 2; 5 – 1; 6 – 11; 7 – 10; 8 – 9	12 – 9; 10 – 8; 11 – 7; 1 – 6; 2 – 5; 3 – 4	4 – 12; 5 – 3; 6 – 2; 7 – 1; 8 – 11; 9 – 10	12 – 10; 11 – 9; 1 – 8; 2 – 7; 3 – 6; 4 – 5	5 – 12; 6 – 4; 7 – 3; 8 – 2; 9 – 1; 10 – 11	12 – 11; 1 – 10; 2 – 9; 3 – 8; 4 – 7; 5 – 6	6 – 12; 7 – 5; 8 – 4; 9 – 3; 10 – 2; 11 – 1	1 – 12; 2 – 11; 3 – 10; 4 – 9; 5 – 8; 6 – 7	12 – 7; 8 – 6; 9 – 5; 10 – 4; 11 – 3; 1 – 2	2 – 12; 3 – 1; 4 – 11; 5 – 10; 6 – 9; 7 – 8	12 – 8; 9 – 7; 10 – 6; 11 – 5; 1 – 4; 2 – 3

Home \ Away	BEI	BnS	BnY	ASH	HAR	HPT	HTA	IKS	MHA	MNE	MPT	MTA
Beitar Jerusalem	—	3–0	2–2	2–1	4–0	—	2–1	—	—	—	—	2–0
Bnei Sakhnin	—	—	3–1	3–2	—	—	—	—	0–0	0–0	—	0–3
Bnei Yehuda	—	—	—	—	1–0	2–1	—	0–0	0–1	2–0	1–1	—
F.C. Ironi Ashdod	—	—	0–3	—	—	1–0	—	2–0	0–3	0–0	—	—
Hakoah Amidar Ramat Gan	—	1–1	—	0–0	—	1–0	—	1–0	—	—	—	1–1
Hapoel Petah Tikva	0–0	2–2	—	—	—	—	0–1	—	—	—	2–0	1–2
Hapoel Tel Aviv	—	1–1	2–1	1–0	3–2	—	—	—	—	1–2	—	1–1
Ironi Kiryat Shmona	2–0	0–2	—	—	—	1–1	1–3	—	—	—	1–2	—
Maccabi Haifa	1–1	—	—	—	2–0	2–1	1–0	2–1	—	—	0–0	—
Maccabi Netanya	1–0	—	—	—	0–0	1–0	—	1–3	0–2	—	1–2	—
Maccabi Petah Tikva	0–2	0–0	—	0–0	0–2	—	1–2	—	—	—	—	0–3
Maccabi Tel Aviv	—	—	2–1	1–0	—	—	—	3–2	1–1	0–1	—	—

Source: Israel Football Association
Legend: Blue = home team win; Yellow = draw; Red = away team win.

== Relegation playoff ==
Hakoah Ramat Gan, as the 11th-placed team, faced the 6th-placed Liga Leumit team Maccabi Ahi Nazareth in a two-legged playoff. Hakoah Ramat Gan lost both games and were relegated to Liga Leumit.

2 June 2009
20:30 UTC+2

Maccabi Ahi Nazareth	2 – 1	Hakoah Ramat Gan
Ayeli 41'; Silvas 48'	Report	For 42'

Ilut Stadium, Ilut
Referee: Alon Yefet

6 June 2009
19:00 UTC+2

Hakoah Ramat Gan	1 – 2	Maccabi Ahi Nazareth
For 23'	Report	Jida 46'; Ayeli 76'

Winter Stadium, Ramat Gan
Referee: Eitan Tabrizi

== Season statistics ==
=== Scoring ===
- First goal of the season: Yossi Shivhon for Maccabi Tel Aviv against Bnei Yehuda, 5th minute (30 August 2008)
- Last goal of the season: Lior Rafaelov for Maccabi Haifa against Beitar Jerusalem, 58th minute (1 June 2009)
- First own goal of the season: Nir Davidovich (Maccabi Haifa) for F.C. Ashdod, 57th minute (30 August 2008)
- Fastest goal in a match: 39 seconds – Thembinkosi Fanteni for Maccabi Haifa against Maccabi Tel Aviv (27 October 2008)
- Goal scored at the latest point in a match: 90+5 minutes – Barak Badash for Hakoah Ramat Gan against Bnei Yehuda (13 September 2008)
- Widest winning margin: 4 goals:
  - Hapoel Tel Aviv 4–0 Beitar Jerusalem (9 February 2009)
  - Beitar Jerusalem 4–0 Hakoah Ramat Gan (4 April 2009)
- Most goals in a match: 6 goals:
  - Hakoah Ramat Gan 2–4 Beitar Jerusalem (20 September 2008)
  - F.C. Ashdod 4–2 Bnei Sakhnin (8 November 2008)
  - F.C. Ashdod 3–3 Maccabi Netanya (20 December 2008)

=== Discipline ===
- First yellow card of the season: Tamir Kahlon for Bnei Yehuda against Maccabi Tel Aviv, 6th minute (30 August 2008)
- First red card of the season: Ronnie Gafney for Maccabi Haifa against F.C. Ashdod, 59th minute (30 August 2008)
- Most yellow cards in a match: 12 yellow cards – Beitar Jerusalem against Maccabi Haifa (28 September 2008)
- Most red cards in a match: 4 red cards – F.C. Ashdod against Ironi Kiryat Shmona (13 September 2008)
- Most cards in a match: 15 cards (12 yellow and 3 red) – Beitar Jerusalem against Maccabi Haifa (28 September 2008)

== Top scorers ==
Rank	Player	Club	Goals
1	(Israel) Barak Yitzhaki	Beitar Jerusalem	14
1	(Israel) Shimon Abuhatzira	Hapoel Petah Tikva	14
1	(Israel) Eliran Atar	Bnei Yehuda	14
4	(Ghana) Samuel Yeboah	Hapoel Tel Aviv	13
5	(Bulgaria) Dimitar Makriev	F.C. Ashdod	11
5	(South Africa) Thembinkosi Fanteni	Maccabi Haifa	11
7	(Israel) David Revivo	F.C. Ashdod	10
7	(Argentina) Pedro Galván	Bnei Yehuda	10
9	(Israel) Maor Buzaglo	Maccabi Tel Aviv	9
9	(Israel) Lior Rafaelov	Maccabi Haifa	9
Total			432
Average per game			2.18

== See also ==
- 2008–09 Israel State Cup
- 2008–09 Toto Cup Al
- List of 2008–09 Israeli football transfers

== Notes ==
A. Biggest away win

Bnei Sakhnin 0–3 Hapoel Petah Tikva (1 November 2008)
Hakoah Ramat Gan 0–3 Maccabi Haifa (1 November 2008)
Bnei Yehuda 0–3 Beitar Jerusalem (8 November 2008)
Hapoel Petah Tikva 1–4 Maccabi Haifa (22 November 2008)
Ironi Kiryat Shmona 0–3 Maccabi Netanya (22 November 2008)
F.C. Ashdod 0–3 Maccabi Haifa (6 April 2009)
Bnei Sakhnin 0–3 Maccabi Tel Aviv (11 April 2009)
F.C. Ashdod 0–3 Bnei Yehuda (2 May 2009)
Maccabi Petah Tikva 0–3 Maccabi Tel Aviv (23 May 2009)
