= Dayan (given name) =

Dayan is a given name. Notable people with the name include:

- Dayan Díaz (born 1989), Colombian baseball player
- Dayan Gonzalez (born 1999), Cuban boxer
- Dayan Hochman-Vigil (fl. 2019), American attorney and politician
- Dayan Jayatilleka (born 1956), Sri Lankan academic, diplomat, writer and politician
- Dayan Khan (1472–1517), khagan of the Northern Yuan dynasty
- Dayan Khan (Khoshut) (died 1668), ruler of the Khoshut Khanate
- Dayan Kodua (born 1980), German-Ghanaian actress, author and model
- Dayan Lake (American football) (born 1997), Liberian American football player
- Dayan Rajapakse (born 1972), Sri Lankan physician, educator and businessman
- Dayan Téllez (born 2002), Mexican football goalkeeper
- Dayán Viciedo (born 1989), Cuban baseball player
- Dayan van der Westhuizen (born 1994), South African rugby player
- Dayan Witharana (born 1962), Sri Lankan singer and photographer

== See also ==
- Dayan (surname)
- Dayana, a given name
- Diane (given name)
