= Dayan =

Dayan or Daayan may refer to:

== Arts and entertainment ==
- Daayan (TV series), an Indian paranormal romance series
- Daayan, a 1996 Hindi short story collection by Bhisham Sahni

== People ==
- Dayan (surname), including a list of people with the surname
  - Moshe Dayan (1915–1981), Israeli military leader and politician
- Dayan (given name), including a list of people with the given name
  - Dayan Khan (1472–1517), khagan of the Northern Yuan dynasty

== Places ==
- Dayan, the Old Town of Lijiang, Yunnan, China
- Dayan, Evenk Autonomous Banner, Inner Mongolia, China
- Dayan, Fenghua, Ningbo, Zhejiang, China
- Dayan, Jiangyou, Sichuan, China
- Dayan, Iran
- Dayan Lake, in Bayan-Ölgii, Mongolia

== Other uses ==
- Dayan (rabbinic judge), Jewish religious judge in a beth din
- Dayan (witch), or dayaan, in Indian and Pakistani folklore
- Dayan, the smaller drum of the tabla set

== See also ==
- Dayana, a given name
- Dakin (disambiguation)
- Dayan Deerh, a Mongolian divinity
- Dayyán, a religious figure
- Ek Thi Daayan ('Once there was a witch'), a 2013 Indian Hindi-language supernatural horror thriller film
