= Foguinho =

Foguinho ([fo'giɲu] – little fire or small fire in the Portuguese language – generally a nickname used, in Brazil, to refer to men with reddish hair and beard) may refer to:

- Humberto Foguinho (born 1978), born Humberto Daniel Soares Martelo, Brazilian football midfielder
- Renan Foguinho (born 1989), born Renan Rodrigues da Silva, Brazilian football defensive midfielder
- Foguinho (footballer, born 1992), born Guilherme Seefeldt Krolow, Brazilian football midfielder
- Foguinho (footballer, born 2000), born Vinicius Xavier da Purificação Moutinho, Brazilian football attacking midfielder
