= Dayan (surname) =

Dayan (דיין) is a Hebrew surname. It means a Jewish religious judge in a Beth din—a position conferring social prestige in a traditional Jewish community, and therefore one whose memory is likely to be retained as a family's surname even after the passage of many generations.

Notable people with the surname include:

- Shmuel Dayan (1891–1968), Zionist activist and Israeli politician (father of Moshe)
  - Moshe Dayan (1915–1981), Israeli military leader and politician
  - Ruth Dayan (1917–2021), widow of Moshe
    - Assi Dayan (1945–2014), Israeli film director, actor (son of Moshe)
    - Yael Dayan (born 1939), Israeli politician and author (daughter of Moshe)
    - Uzi Dayan (born 1948), Israeli general and politician (nephew of Moshe)
    - Dani Dayan (born 1955), Chairman of Yad Vashem (relative)
    - Ilana Dayan (born 1964), Israeli investigative journalist, jurist and anchorwoman (relative)
- Charles Dayan (1792–1877), American lawyer and politician
- Charles Dayan (real estate developer) (born 1941), American real estate developer
- Colin Dayan, American professor
- Daniel Dayan (born 1943), French social scientist
- Dedi Ben Dayan (born 1978), Israeli football player
- Haim Dayan (born 1960), Israeli politician
- Michele Dayan (born 1961), Israeli football player and manager
- Emilia Dayan (fl. 1870), Egyptian stage actress
- Ortal Ben Dayan (born 1981), Israeli feminist blogger and activist
- Peter Dayan, neuroscience scholar
- Rebecca Dayan, French-American actress and model
- Roei Dayan (born 1984), Israeli football player
- Yosef Dayan (born 1945), Israeli political activist
- Yuval Dayan (born 1994), Israeli singer-songwriter

== See also ==
- Moshe Dayan Center for Middle Eastern and African Studies
- Dayan (given name)
