= Reinard =

Reinard may refer to:

- Megumi Reinard, a character from the anime Martian Successor Nadesico
- Reinard the Fox, a fox in medieval European literature

== People with the surname Reinard ==
- Julian Reinard (born 1983), German footballer
- Reinard Wilson (born 1973), American football linebacker
