= Vardis (name) =

Vardis is both a given name and a surname. Notable people with the name include:

- Vardis Fisher (1895–1968), American writer
- Vardis Vardinogiannis (born 1933), Greek billionaire
- Antonis Vardis (1948–2014), Greek composer
- Charles Vardis (1985–2021), Ghanaian footballer
