= Ahmed Abubakar Ndakene =

Nigerian politician

Federal Representative
- Constituency: Edu/Moro/Pategi

Personal details
- Born: 1972 (age 53–54)
- Party: All Progressives Congress (APC)
- Occupation: Politician

Ahmed Abubakar Ndakene is a Nigerian politician. He served as a member representing Edu/Moro/Pategi Federal Constituency in the House of Representatives. Born in 1972, he hails from Kwara State. He was elected into the House of Assembly at the 2019 elections under the All Progressives Congress (APC). He gained court victory in a suit filed against him by Mahmoud Bako on account of certificate forgery. He was succeeded by Ahmed Saba.
