= Erik Hort =

American soccer player

Personal information
- Full name: Erik Abraham Hort
- Date of birth: February 16, 1987 (age 39)
- Place of birth: Montebello, New York, United States
- Height: 5 ft 6 in (1.68 m)
- Position: Defender

Team information
- Current team: Sevilla FC Puerto Rico
- Number: 3

Youth career
- Sparta Prague

Senior career*
Years	Team	Apps	(Gls)
2005–2007	Sparta Prague B	5	(0)
2007–2008	Chicago Fire	0	(0)
2008	FK Slavoj Vyšehrad	4	(0)
2009	Maccabi Tel Aviv	0	(0)
2010	Hapoel Ra'anana	2	(0)
2010–2011	Sevilla FC Puerto Rico	12	(4)

International career^{‡}
2006	United States U20	3	(0)
- * Club domestic league appearances and goals as of 02:48, 21 August 2012 (UTC) ‡ National team caps and goals as of 00:00, 21 May 2007 (UTC)

Erik Hort (born February 16, 1987, in Montebello, New York) is an American soccer player who is a free agent.

Hort grew up in Montebello, NY. He is one of five children. His father, David Hort, is of Austrian descent, and his mother, Ora Hort, is of Israeli descent. Hort grew up In the academy PDA (Players Development Academy) In New Jersey. Hort was also a member of the Eastern New York ODP, Regional and National Team. With a very promising career ahead of him, Hort broke his leg in 2000 right before the National Team try outs, but quickly bounced back. In Hort's senior year of high school, He was discovered by Czech powerhouse Sparta Prague during a trip with the Regional team. He was eventually signed by them and spent one and a half seasons on their reserve team before joining the Fire in the fall of 2006. He has the ability to play several positions and can create opportunities with his great ability. After the year with the Fire Hort spent the next year going through two sports hernia surgeries in 2007–2008 before coming back and signing with Maccabi Tel Aviv. In 2009 Hort joined Maccabi Tel Aviv In the Israeli First Division where he signed for a year before moving to Hapoel Ra'anana also in the First Division, moving from the Second the year before.

He earned 3 caps with the United States U-20 men's national soccer team in 2006.

== Career statistics ==
Club performance			League		Cup		League Cup		Continental		Total	
Season	Club	League	Apps	Goals	Apps	Goals	Apps	Goals	Apps	Goals	Apps	Goals
Israel			League		Israel State Cup		Toto Cup		Europe		Total	
2008–09	Maccabi Tel Aviv	Liga Al	0	0	0	0	0	0	0	0	0	0
2009–10	Hapoel Ra'anana	Liga Al	0	0	0	0	1	0	0	0	1	0
Puerto Rico			League		Torneo de Copa de Puerto Rico		League Cup		North America		Total	
2010	Sevilla FC	PRSL	0	0	0	0	0	0	0	0	0	0
2011	Sevilla FC	USL Pro	3	0	0	0	0	0	0	0	3	0
Career total			3	0	0	0	1	0	0	0	4	0
