= Abdulkarim Lukman =

Nigerian footballer

Personal information
- Full name: Abdulkarim Lukman
- Date of birth: 6 September 1990 (age 36)
- Place of birth: Jos, Nigeria
- Height: 1.79 m (5 ft 10 in)
- Position: Midfielder

Team information
- Current team: Shabab Al Jeel

Senior career*
Years	Team	Apps	(Gls)
2008–2009	Hakoah Ramat Gan	4	(0)
2013–2014	Sunshine Stars		
2015–	Shabab Al Jeel		

International career
2007	Nigeria U-17	4	(0)
- * Club domestic league appearances and goals as of 5 November 2016

Abdulkarim Lukman (born 6 September 1990) is a Nigerian football midfielder playing for Yemeni club Shabab Al Jeel.

== Club career ==
Born in Jos, Lukman still teenager debuted professionally in Israel, playing with Hakoah Amidar Ramat Gan F.C. in the 2008–09 Israeli Premier League.

He spent some time back in Nigeria and with Sunshine Stars F.C. in 2013 and 2014.

Since 2014 he has been playing in Yemen with Shabab Al Jeel.

== International career ==
He was part of the Nigerian tournament winning team at the 2007 FIFA U-17 World Cup played in South Korea. He made 4 appearances.

== Honours ==
Nigeria U17

- FIFA U-17 World Cup: 2007
