= Dayana =

Dayana is a given name. Notable people with the name include:

- Dayana Cadeau (born 1966), Haitian-born Canadian American professional bodybuilder
- Dayana Cázares (born 1999), Mexican football midfielder
- Dayana Colmenares (born 1984), Miss Venezuela International 2007
- Dayana Garroz (born 1978), Venezuelan actress
- Dayana Kirillova (born 2002), Russian singer
- Dayana Martinez (born 1986), Venezuelan épée fencer
- Dayana Mendoza (born 1986), Venezuelan Miss Universe 2008 and contestant on Celebrity Apprentice
- Dayana Rodríguez (born 2001), Venezuelan footballer
- Dayana Yastremska (born 2000), Ukrainian professional tennis player

== See also ==
- Dayan (disambiguation)
- Laudakia dayana, a species of lizard
- Laelia dayana or Sophronitis dayana, a species of orchid endemic to Brazil
