= Tal Hen =

Israeli footballer

Tal Hen טל חן
Personal information
- Full name: Tal Hen טל חן
- Date of birth: August 4, 1979 (age 47)
- Place of birth: Holon, Israel
- Position: Center-back

Youth career
- Hapoel Tzafririm Holon

Senior career*
Years	Team	Apps	(Gls)
1997–2000	Hapoel Tzafririm Holon	67	(4)
2000–2001	Maccabi Netanya	25	(3)
2001–2003	Hapoel Haifa	45	(2)
2003–2008	Hapoel Tel Aviv	94	(6)
2008–2011	Bnei Sakhnin	61	(3)
2011–2013	Hapoel Ramat Gan	51	(0)
2013–2014	Hapoel Bnei Lod	23	(0)

International career
1999–2001	Israel U-21	14	(0)
- * Club domestic league appearances and goals

Tal Hen (Hebrew: טל חן; born August 4, 1979) is a former Israeli football player.

== Career ==
Hen began his career as a defender for Hapoel Tzafririm Holon F.C. youth team. Hen also captained the Israeli national youth team.

In 2000 Hen transferred to Maccabi Netanya.

A year later he moved to Hapoel Haifa who were relegated to the National League that season and played there the following year.

During the 2003/2004 season he transferred to Hapoel Tel Aviv. On his debut Tal scored the first goal of three that led the team to a victory against Beitar Jerusalem. That performance secured his place in the first team squad. Throughout the 2004/2005 season he was one of the most prominent players in the team as he was one of the players that helped Hapoel Tel Aviv avoid relegation from the Israeli Premier League. Due to his sterling performances Hen was called up to the Israel national football team.

He received the accolade of “Exceptional Player” from Hapoel Tel Aviv fans at the end of the 2004/2005 season.

He won the Israeli Cup in the 2005/2006 season, this was his first piece of silverware.

As a boy he supported Arsenal F.C. and has said his favourite player was Steve Bould

== Honours ==
- Israel State Cup (3):
  - 2006, 2007, 2013
- Toto Cup (Leumit) (1)
  - 2011
- Liga Leumit
  - 2011-12
