= Freddy David =

Israeli football manager (born 1965)

Freddy David פרדי דוד
Personal information
- Date of birth: 21 January 1965 (age 61)
- Place of birth: Israel

Senior career*
Years	Team	Apps	(Gls)
1986–1987	Hapoel Petah Tikva		

Managerial career
- 1994–1999: Hapoel Petah Tikva (youth)
- 1999–2000: Hapoel Petah Tikva (U19)
- 2000–2001: Ironi Rishon LeZion (assistant)
- 2001–2003: Hapoel Petah Tikva (assistant)
- 2003–2004: Hapoel Petah Tikva
- 2005–2008: Maccabi Herzliya
- 2008: Bnei Sakhnin
- 2009–2011: Maccabi Petah Tikva
- 2011–2012: Hapoel Ramat Gan
- 2013: Hapoel Tel Aviv
- 2014–2015: Maccabi Herzliya
- 2015–2016: Hapoel Katamon Jerusalem
- * Club domestic league appearances and goals

Freddy David (Hebrew: פרדי דוד; born 21 January 1965) is an Israel former football player and manager.

He previously managed Hapoel Petah Tikva, Maccabi Herzliya, Bnei Sakhnin, Maccabi Petah Tikva, and Hapoel Ramat Gan.

== Honours ==
- Toto Cup 2007
- Toto Cup (Leumit) 2011
- Liga Leumit 2011–12
