= Foguinho (footballer, born 2000) =

Brazilian footballer

Personal information
- Full name: Vinicius Xavier da Purificação Moutinho
- Date of birth: 17 July 2000 (age 26)
- Place of birth: Ouro Preto, Brazil
- Height: 1.69 m (5 ft 7 in)
- Position: Attacking midfielder

Team information
- Current team: Amazonas
- Number: 21

Youth career
- 2013–2016: Cruzeiro
- 2017: Guarani
- 2018: Juventus-SP
- 2018–2019: Botafogo
- 2019–2020: Chapecoense

Senior career*
Years	Team	Apps	(Gls)
2020–2023	Chapecoense	54	(6)
2021	→ Brusque (loan)	8	(0)
2022	→ Vitória (loan)	3	(0)
2023	→ São Bento (loan)	4	(0)
2023–	Amazonas	15	(0)
- * Club domestic league appearances and goals as of 15:06, 27 May 2022 (UTC)

Vinicius Xavier da Purificação Moutinho (born 17 July 2000), commonly known as Foguinho, is a Brazilian professional footballer who plays as an attacking midfielder for Amazonas.

== Club career ==
Born in Ouro Preto, Minas Gerais, Foguinho represented Cruzeiro, Guarani, Juventus-SP, Botafogo and Chapecoense as a youth. After impressing with the latter in the 2020 Copa São Paulo de Futebol Júnior, he was promoted to the first team and renewed his contract until 2023 on 13 February 2020.

Foguinho made his first team debut on 15 February 2020, in a 1–1 Campeonato Catarinense home draw against Criciúma; after coming on as a second-half substitute for Yann Rolim, he scored the equalizer after 14 minutes on the pitch.

== Career statistics ==
As of 26 October 2021

Club	Season	League			State League		Cup		Continental		Other		Total	
Club	Season	Division	Apps	Goals	Apps	Goals	Apps	Goals	Apps	Goals	Apps	Goals	Apps	Goals
Chapecoense	2020	Série B	18	2	7	2	2	1	—		—		27	5
Chapecoense	2021	Série A	8	0	7	0	1	0	—		1 (Note: Appearance(s) in Recopa Catarinense)	0	17	0
Chapecoense	Total		26	2	14	2	3	1	—		1	0	44	5
Brusque (loan)	2021	Série B	2	0	—		—		—		—		2	0
Career total			28	2	14	2	3	1	0	0	1	0	46	5
