= Pablo del Río =

Argentine footballer

Personal information
- Full name: Pablo Fernando del Río
- Date of birth: January 11, 1976 (age 50)
- Place of birth: Buenos Aires, Argentina
- Height: 1.73 m (5 ft 8 in)
- Position: Striker

Senior career*
Years	Team	Apps	(Gls)
1997–1999	Independiente	21	(0)
2000–2002	Banfield	52	(5)
2002	Beitar Jerusalem	11	(1)
2003	Aucas	8	(0)
2003–2004	Ferro Carril Oeste	14	(0)
2004–2005	San Martín de Mendoza	6	(0)
- * Club domestic league appearances and goals

Pablo del Río (born 11 January 1976 in Buenos Aires) is a former Argentine footballer. He played for a number of clubs in Argentina, Aucas in Ecuador and Beitar Jerusalem in Israel.
