= George Baysah =

Liberian footballer

Personal information
- Full name: George Baysah Yokoe
- Date of birth: March 1, 1991 (age 35)
- Place of birth: Montserrado County, Liberia
- Height: 1.78 m (5 ft 10 in)
- Position: Defensive midfielder

Youth career
- 2006: Watanga FC

Senior career*
Years	Team	Apps	(Gls)
2007–2009	LISCR	19	(3)
2009–2010	→ Hapoel Kfar Saba (loan)	32	(4)
2010–2011	Hapoel Kfar Saba	18	(3)
2011–2013	→ Maccabi Umm al-Fahm (loan)	5	(1)

International career
2006–2010	Liberia	7	(0)
- * Club domestic league appearances and goals

George Baysah Yokoe (born March 1, 1991) is a Liberian former footballer who played as a defender.

== Career ==
Baysah played for Hapoel Kfar Saba in Israel, for LISCR and Watanga FC in Liberia and for the Liberia national team.

=== International ===
Baysah made his international debut against Equatorial Guinea on 3 September 2006.
