= Jeff Tutuana =

Congolese footballer (born 1982)

Personal information
- Full name: Gemi Tutuana
- Date of birth: 20 March 1982 (age 44)
- Place of birth: Kinshasa, Zaire
- Height: 1.85 m (6 ft 1 in)
- Positions: Winger; striker

Senior career*
Years	Team	Apps	(Gls)
2000–2003	AS Vita Club		
2003–2005	Hapoel Haifa	32	(10)
2005–2006	Beitar Jerusalem	18	(4)
2006	Ashdod	0	(0)
2006	Maccabi Netanya	11	(0)
2006–2008	Enosis Neon Paralimni	31	(4)
2009	Ayia Napa FC	0	(0)
2009–2010	Olympiakos Nicosia	25	(6)
2010–2012	AEK Kouklion	0	(0)

International career
2002–2004	DR Congo	3	(0)
- * Club domestic league appearances and goals

Gemi Tutuana (born 20 March 1982), commonly known as Jeff Tutuana, is a Congolese former professional footballer who played as a winger or striker. He spent most of his career in Israel and Cyprus. Between 2002 and 2004 he made three appearances for the DR Congo national team.

== Career ==
Tutuana start playing football in a club called Japatra in the Congo. He played there from 1997 to 1999, then moved to a bigger football club called AS Vita Club, where he played from 2000 to 2002.

After that, he tried his luck in Belgium with one of his friends from Vita Club called Nsumbu Mazuwa, but the two did not pass the tests of the Belgian football clubs and had to use an offer that they had from Israel and were signed by Hapoel Haifa in 2003. They played together in Haifa from 2003 to 2005; during those years they won the Second Division and helped the team to reach the Israeli Premier League. However, after one season the team was relegated to the Second Division after finishing in last place.

Later he moved to Beitar Jerusalem who wanted him since the last season was over. He scored 4 goals in 19 games, suffered from a serious back injury and was released after one season and replaced by Spanish striker David Aganzo.

After being released he went to France to see his newborn daughter (his first child) and after he got his strength back he decided to train with the AS Saint-Étienne team. He then returned to Israel and was signed by F.C. Ashdod but almost was signed by AS Cannes, whose coach Luis Fernandez was the former coach of Beitar who had released Tutuana but wanted to see him plays for AS Cannes. He also played in Israel for Maccabi Netanya.

Tutuana then moved to Cyprus in 2006 and played for Enosis Neon Paralimni in the Cypriot First Division for two seasons. In 2009, he moved to Ayia Napa FC in the Cypriot Second Division and later to Olympiakos Nicosia.

Tutuana appeared for the DR Congo national team.
