= Ahmed Saba =

Nigerian politician

Ahmed Adam Saba

Federal Representative
- Preceded by: Ahmed Abubakar Ndakene
- Constituency: Edu/Moro/Patigi

Personal details
- Occupation: Politician

Ahmed Adam Saba is a Nigerian politician. He currently serve as a member of the House Representatives, representing Edu/Moro/Patigi of Kwara state in the 10th National assembly.
