= Idan Malichi =

Israeli footballer

Idan Malichi עידן מליחי
Personal information
- Date of birth: 11 June 1979 (age 47)
- Place of birth: Petah Tikva, Israel
- Position: Midfielder

Team information
- Current team: Ashbourne Rugby, Ashbourne

Youth career
- 1995–1997: Maccabi Petah Tikva

Senior career*
Years	Team	Apps	(Gls)
1997–2003	Maccabi Petah Tikva		
2003–2006	Beitar Jerusalem		
2006–2007	F.C. Ashdod	15	(0)
2007–2008	Bnei Yehuda Tel Aviv	13	(0)

International career
2000–2001	Israel U21	6	(0)
- * Club domestic league appearances and goals

Idan Malichi (Hebrew: עידן מליחי; born 11 June 1979) is an Israeli footballer who played for Bnei Yehuda Tel Aviv, F.C. Ashdod, Beitar Jerusalem and Maccabi Petah Tikva. At international level, Malichi was capped for the Israel national under-21 football team.

== Sports career ==
Malichi began in the Maccabi Petah Tikva youth team, and in 1997/1998 season he went to the first team of the club. In the first team Malichi won in the Toto Cup in 1999/2000 season and reached the Israel State Cup final in the next season.

In 2003/2004 season Malichi signed in Beitar Jerusalem. Because of the arrival of many foreign players to Beitar such as Jérôme Leroy and Fabrice Fernandes and because of many injuries, Malichi barely played with the team.
