= Oshri Gita =

Israeli footballer

Oshri Gita אושרי גיטא
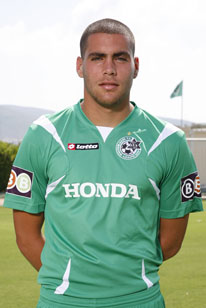
- Oshri Gita in 2015

Personal information
- Full name: Oshri Gita
- Date of birth: 2 July 1985 (age 41)
- Place of birth: Tirat Carmel, Israel
- Position: Striker

Youth career
- Maccabi Haifa

Senior career*
Years	Team	Apps	(Gls)
2003–2004	Maccabi Haifa	1	(0)
2004	Hapoel Haifa	6	(0)
2005	Maccabi Ahi Nazareth		
2005	Hapoel Nazareth Illit	0	(0)
2006	Hapoel Acre		
2006	Hapoel Ra'anana		
2007	Hakoah Ramat Gan	10	(3)
2007–2008	Maccabi Haifa	2	
2008–2011	Hapoel Acre	0	(0)
2011	Hapoel Ashkelon		(6)
2011–2012	Hapoel Ra'anana		(1)
- * Club domestic league appearances and goals as of 30 May 2007

Oshri Gita (Hebrew: אושרי גיטא; born 2 July 1985) is an Israeli retired football player. During the 2007–08 season, with Maccabi Haifa Oshri's goal against Hapoel Petah Tikva during the 2006–07 season, was ranked in the top ten goals of the season by Sport5. He holds a rather rare distinction in Israel, having run the fastest ten metre dash during tests at the Wingate Institute, beating the previous record held by Yakubu.
