= Daniel Dayan =

French social scientist

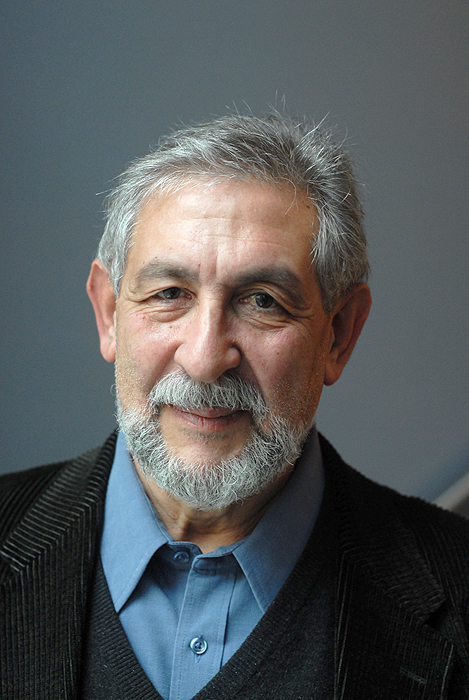
Daniel Dayan

Daniel Dayan is a French social scientist born in 1943. A fellow of the Marcel Mauss Institute at Ecole des Hautes Etudes en Sciences Sociales and the Levinas European Institute, Dayan has been Director of Research in Sociology at Centre National de la Recherche Scientifique, professor of Media Theory at the Institut d'Etudes Politiques (Sciences Po) Paris, and a Hans Speier Visiting Professor at the New school for Social Research.

Dayan holds degrees in anthropology, comparative literature, semiotics and film studies from the Sorbonne, Stanford University and L’Ecole des Hautes Etudes en Sciences Sociales where he received a Ph.D in Aesthetics under the direction of Roland Barthes.

Dayan has been a visiting lecturer and visiting professor in Media Sociology and Film Theory at numerous universities including Paris II-Institut Français de Presse, Paris III-Sorbonne Nouvelle, Hebrew University Jerusalem, Tel Aviv University, Moscow-RGGU, Milano, Stanford-France, The University of Southern California, The University of Pennsylvania, The University of Oslo, and The University of Geneva.

From 1999 to 2004 Dayan was a member of the European Science Foundation Media ("Changing media, Changing Europe"). In 2000 he was a resident of the Rockefeller Foundation, Bellagio. In 2001, he served as a foreign expert on media studies for the British "Research Assessment Exercise". In 2005 he was invited as a resident fellow at the Institute for Advanced Studies, Hebrew University, and as an Annenberg Scholar at the University of Pennsylvania. In 2006 he was the Free Speech visiting professor at the University of Bergen. In 2010, he received the ICA Fellows Award for the book Media Events: The Live Broadcasting of History, co-authored with American sociologist Elihu Katz. In 2013 he was invited to give the seventh William Phillips lecture (Partisan Review) in New York.

Dayan's work is available in 13 languages. His most recent books are La Terreur spectacle: Terrorisme et Télévision (Paris. INA-De Boek, 2006; translated into Portuguese in 2009); Televisao Das Audiencias aos Publicos (with Jose Carlos Abrantes, Lisboa, Livros Horizonte, 2006); Owning the Olympics. Narratives of the New China (with Monroe Price, N Y, Michigan University Press, 2008.

Dayan has been a translator, a journal editor, and a media commentator, in print and on screen. He took part in three documentaries and contributed chapters to about a hundred books or journals. including: Les Annales, Annals of the American Social and Political sciences; the American journal of Sociology;Communications; Le Débat; Film Quarterly The Journal of Communication; L’Homme; Religion; Terrain; Etudes; Media, Culture and Society; Partisan Review; Réseaux; Revista de Occidente.

== Current work: attention, visibility, regard ==
Dayan's work is characterized by an emphasis on visual forms in the mass media. It covers three interrelated areas: the aesthetics of cinema, the anthropology of television, and the sociology of media and publics. Dayan's current research is concerned with understanding the role of media in managing social attention. Dayan focuses on the anthropology of showing: ethnographic explorations of how granting, denying or imposing attention in situations of protest, conflict or controversy contribute to a discussion of the status of visibility in contemporary societies and its role in providing regard.

== Bibliography ==
Selected books:

- Western Graffiti: Jeu de l’image et Programmation du Spectateur dans un film de John Ford. Paris. Clancier -Guénaud. 1983
- Media Events. The Live Broadcasting of History. (with Elihu Katz.) Cambridge, Harvard University Press. 1992, 1994, 1996, & translations in French, Italian, Spanish, Portuguese, Japanese, Chinese, Korean, Polish.
- La Terreur Spectacle. Terrorisme et Télévision Paris. INA & De Boeck, 2006 & Portuguese translation: O terror Espectàculo. Terrorismo & Televisao, Lisboa, Editoria Setenta, 2009.
- Owning the Olympics: Narratives of the New China (with Monroe Price) Michigan University Press. 2008

Selected Papers:

- "The Tutor Code of Classical Cinema". Film Quarterly. University of California Press. Berkeley. Fall 1975-Chinese translation Li Youjao Structuralism & Semiotics. Beijing I987.
- "Rituels Publics à Usage Privé": (with Elihu Katz). Les Annales: Economie, Société, Civilisation. Paris, Armand Colin. n° 1–2, 1983
- "Présentation du Pape en voyageur: Télévision, Expérience rituelle et dramaturgie politique". Terrain. Carnets du Patrimoine Ethnologique...." Le Paraitre en Public". N° I5, Nov 1990.
- "Les Mystéres de la Réception". Le Débat n° 17. Paris. September 1992.
- "The peculiar Public of Television". Media, Culture & Society. vol 23, N° 6, London, November 2001
- "Mothers, Midwives and Abortionists. Genealogy and obstetrics of Audiences and Publics" in Sonia Livingstone, ed: Audiences and Publics. European Science Foundation. Bristol, Intellect Press, 2005
- "On Morality, distance and the other: a debate with Roger Silverstone". The International journal of Communication. Vol 1, January 2007
- "Sharing & Showing: Television, Attention, Monstration". Annals of the American Academy of Social and Political Sciences. Vol 625–1, 2009
- "Conquering, Visibility, Conferring Visibility. Visibility seekers and media performance". International journal of Communication, 7, 2013 (Special Issue "Communications as a discipline: Views from Europe")
- "On whose terms are you shown?" Pinchevsky, Couldry & Madianou, eds. Media & Ethics. London, Palgrave 2013
- "Media and the politics of Showing". The William Phillips Lecture, New York, Feb. 2013
