= Valentin Teodorica =

Romanian-Israeli footballer (born 1981)

Valentin Teodorica ולנטין תודוריקה
Personal information
- Date of birth: 26 January 1981 (age 45)
- Place of birth: Râmnicu Vâlcea, Romania
- Height: 1.83 m (6 ft 0 in)
- Position: Midfielder

Team information
- Current team: Hapoel Mevaseret Zion

Youth career
- Beitar Jerusalem

Senior career*
Years	Team	Apps	(Gls)
1999–2001	Beitar Jerusalem		
2001–2002	Hakoah Ramat Gan		
2002–2005	Hapoel Jerusalem		
2005–2007	Hapoel Kfar Saba	30	(0)
2007	Hapoel Jerusalem	6	(0)
2007–2008	Hapoel Mevaseret Zion	14	(1)
- * Club domestic league appearances and goals

Valentin Teodorica (Hebrew: ולנטין תודוריקה; born 26 January 1981) is a Romanian-Israeli professional association football player who played in the Israeli Premier League for Hapoel Kfar Saba and also played for Hapoel Mevaseret Zion, Hapoel Jerusalem, Hakoah Ramat Gan and Beitar Jerusalem.
