= Maor Peretz =

Israeli footballer

Maor Peretz מאור פרץ
Personal information
- Date of birth: 18 November 1983 (age 42)
- Height: 1.76 m (5 ft 9 in)
- Position: Defender

Senior career*
Years	Team	Apps	(Gls)
2000–2003	Ashdod		
2003–2004	Hapoel Nir Ramat HaSharon		
2004–2006	Ashdod		
2006–2007	Hapoel Tel Aviv		
2008	Hapoel Ironi Kiryat Shmona		
2008–2010	Ashdod		
2011	Hapoel Kfar Saba		
2011–2016	Maccabi Yavne		
- * Club domestic league appearances and goals

Maor Peretz (Hebrew: מאור פרץ; born 18 November 1983) is a retired Israeli football defender.
