= Alan Damián Bender =

Argentine-Israeli footballer

Alan Bender אלן בנדר
Personal information
- Full name: Alan Damián Bender אלן דמיאן בנדר
- Date of birth: 16 February 1986 (age 40)
- Place of birth: Buenos Aires, Argentina
- Height: 1.73 m (5 ft 8 in)
- Position: Striker

Senior career*
Years	Team	Apps	(Gls)
2005–2008	Ferro Carril Oeste	9	(0)
2008	Ironi Nir Ramat HaSharon	0	(0)
2008	Hakoah Amidar/Ramat Gan	4	(0)
2009–2011	Maccabi Ironi Kfar Yona	?	(?)
2011–2014	FC Punta del Este	?	(?)
- * Club domestic league appearances and goals as of 00:24, 13 October 2014(UTC)

Alan Damián Bender (Hebrew: אלן דמיאן בנדר; born 16 February 1986) is a retired Argentine-Israeli association football player who last played for Punta del Este in Uruguay.

== Playing career ==
Bender arrived in Israel and first trialled with Hapoel Tel Aviv. Due to his being Jewish, he was able to trial with the club since he would not count as a foreigner. Bender was passed on by Hapoel and decided to try to join other Israeli clubs.

After trialling with Ironi Nir Ramat HaSharon and playing a Toto Cup match with the club, Bender ended up signing with Hakoah Amidar/Ramat Gan. Despite impressing early in the season, Bender started to establish a poor reputation when he was fined for not taking training seriously. Just three months after joining the club, he was released by Hakoah due to his behavioral issues. After being released, he trialled at Maccabi Netanya. Then manager Lothar Matthäus was impressed by Bender, but decided not to sign him. After 2 season's with liga Alef side Maccabi Ironi Kfar Yona, Bender was released and returned to play in Uruguay. He retired in 2014.

== After retirement ==
Alan started a clothing store in Buenos Aires.

== Statistics ==
Club performance			League		Cup		League Cup		Continental		Total		
Season	Club	League	Apps	Goals	Apps	Goals	Apps	Goals	Apps	Goals	Apps	Goals	
Israel			League		Israel State Cup		Toto Cup		Europe		Total		
2008	Ironi Nir Ramat HaSharon	Liga Leumit	0	0	0	0	1	0	0	0	1	0	
2008	Hakoah Amidar/Ramat Gan	Ligat ha'Al	4	0	0	0	2	1	0	0	6	1	
2009	Maccabi Ironi Kfar Yona	Liga Alef	0	0	0	0	0	0	0	0	0	0	
Total	Israel			4	0	0	0	3	1	0	0	7	1
Career total													
