= Ravid Gazal =

Israeli footballer

Ravid Gazal רביד גזל
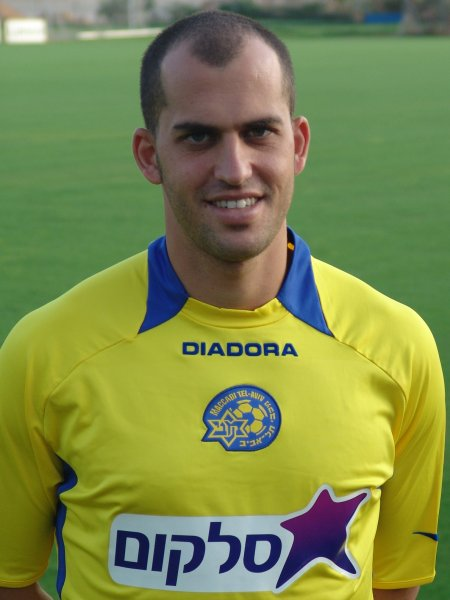

Personal information
- Full name: Ravid Gazal
- Date of birth: 9 June 1982 (age 44)
- Place of birth: Netanya, Israel
- Height: 1.73 m (5 ft 8 in)
- Position: Midfielder

Youth career
- 1991–2000: Maccabi Netanya

Senior career*
Years	Team	Apps	(Gls)
2000–2004	Maccabi Netanya	98	(2)
2004–2007	Maccabi Haifa	35	(0)
2005–2006	→ Hapoel Petah Tikva (loan)	24	(2)
2007–2008	Maccabi Tel Aviv	24	(0)
2008–2010	Maccabi Netanya	53	(6)
2010–2011	Hapoel Ashkelon	27	(2)
2011–2013	Hapoel Ironi Kiryat Shmona	44	(0)
2013	Hapoel Be'er Sheva	12	(1)
2013–2014	Bnei Sakhnin	22	(1)
2014–2015	Ironi Tiberias	19	(0)
2015–2016	Maccabi Ahi Nazareth	10	(1)
2016–2017	Maccabi Netanya	18	(0)
2017–2018	F.C. Tira	29	(1)
2018	Hapoel Bik'at HaYarden	7	(0)
2018–2019	F.C. Tira	18	(1)

International career
2001–2004	Israel U-21	16	(0)
2004–2008	Israel	9	(0)

Managerial career
- 2019–2021: Hapoel Kfar Saba (Assistant manager)
- 2021: Shimshon Kafr Qasim
- 2021–2022: F.C. Tira
- 2022–: Ironi Kiryat Shmona (Assistant manager)
- * Club domestic league appearances and goals

Ravid Gazal (Hebrew: רביד גזל; born June 9, 1982) is a retired Israeli footballer who now works as the assistant manager of Hapoel Kfar Saba.

== Early life ==
The son of Albert Gazal, a former footballer at Maccabi Netanya, Gazal followed in his father's footsteps when he joined at just nine years of age.

Gazal played for Maccabi Netanya's first squad for the first time in the 1999–2000 season (vs. Hapoel Petah Tikva) and played for Maccabi Netanya until the end of the 2003–04 season, when Maccabi Netanya was relegated and he transferred to Maccabi Haifa. During the season of 2005–06, he was moved on loan to Hapoel Petah-Tiqva and returned to Maccabi Haifa at the end of that season. In October 2007, he transferred to Maccabi Tel Aviv. At the end of the season of 2007–08 he returned to Maccabi Netanya.

On 6 November 2014 signed to Ironi Tiberias. On 13 October 2015 signed to Maccabi Ahi Nazareth.

Gazal has represented Israel at under 21 16 times and full national team 9 times.

== Honours ==
- Israeli Premier League
  - Winner (2): 2004–05, 2011–12
- Toto Cup
  - Winner (1): 2011–12
- Liga Leumit
  - Winner (1): 2016-17
