= Dayan Kodua =

German actress

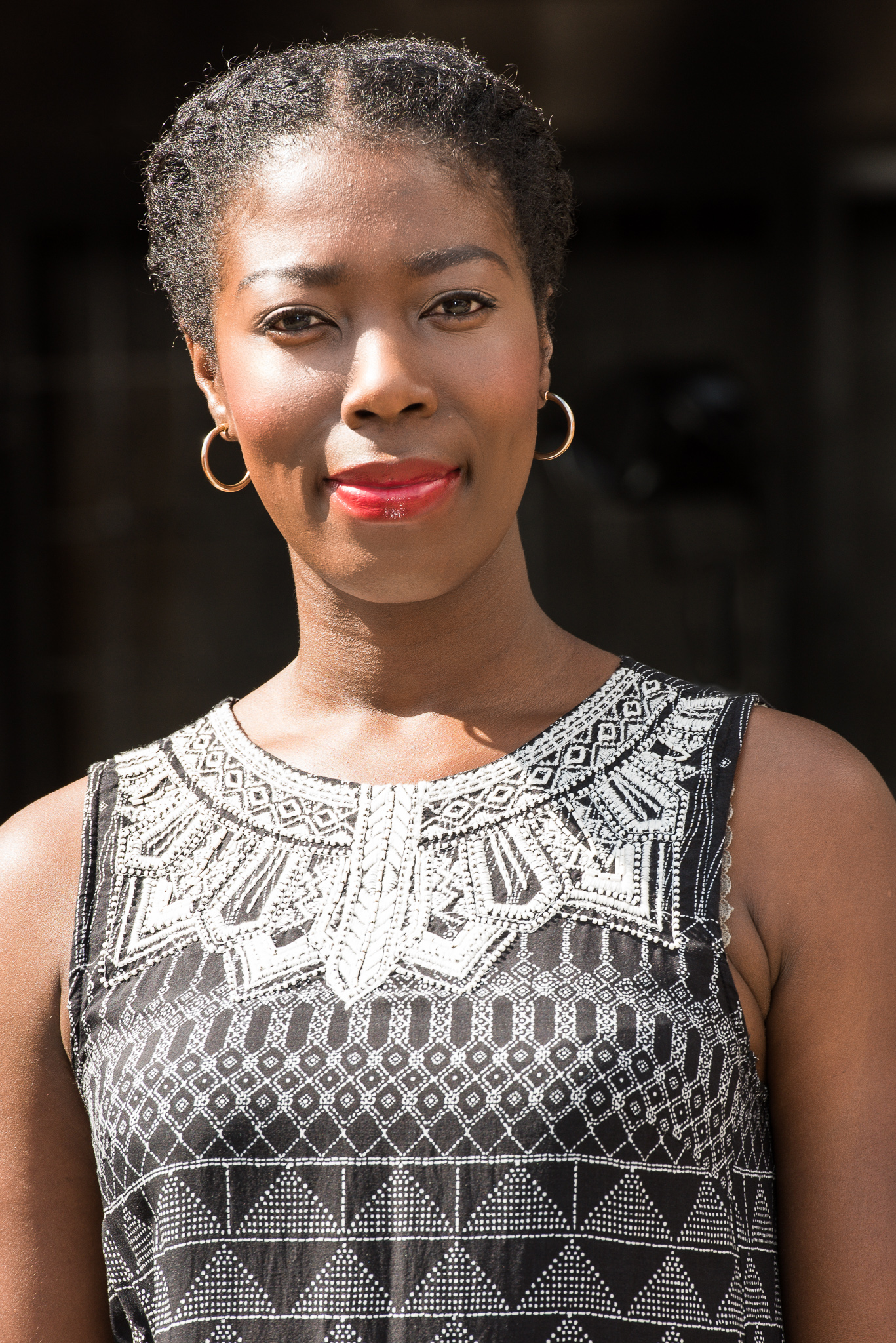
- Kodua in 2016
- Born: 7 September 1980 (age 46); Ghana
- Citizenship: Germany
- Occupations: Actress, author, model
- Notable work: My Black Skin: Black. Successful. German.
- Website: dayan-k.de

Dayan Kodua (born 7 September 1980) is a German actress, author and model of Ghanaian descent. In 2001, she became the first and only black woman to win a beauty contest in Germany. She has starred in a number of American and German movies and was honored ambassador for the African continent in Germany in 2005.

== Early life and education ==
Kodua was ten years old when her family relocated from Ghana to build a better future in Germany. She belongs to the "Ashanti" (warriors) tribe. German became her second mother tongue alongside her Akan language Twi; later she also mastered English and French. As a teenager, she sang and was a background dancer for Chris de Burgh, Sasha, Lou Bega, Haddaway, Right Said Fred and a few others.

At Kiel University of Applied Sciences, Kodua obtained a degree to become a state-certified economics assistant. She later pursued her passion to study acting at the Coaching Company Berlin. And then furthered at the Theater of Arts and Howard Fine Acting Studio in Los Angeles.

== Career ==
Soon she started modelling and became the first and so far only black Miss Schleswig-Holstein in 2001. Bookings for the fashion designers Thierry Mugler, Escada and Versace followed. She then began studying at the Coaching Company in Berlin. And she trained at Howard Fine, Theater of Arts and Tasha Smith Studio in Los Angeles.

In America, Kodua worked in major productions such as Boston Legal, Passions, and the feature films Crank and Lords of the Underworld.

She has also appeared in a number of German films and TV series, Shark Attack in the Mediterranean, Balko, Wolffs Revier, and Auf Herz und Nieren. In 2011, she took over Hannes Jaenicke and Anne Will a voice in the video game "AJABU – The legacy of the ancestors".

== Personal life ==
As of December 2014, she had a three-year-old son.

=== Philanthropy ===
Kodua has initiated and sponsored some charity projects, including: working for the Michael Jordan Foundation on the Catwalk at the House of Blues, Los Angeles, in 2006 with Angie Stone and Snoop Dogg. She founded Dayan international, which is also making a mark for her homeland Ghana. As the patron of GhanaHelp, she is particularly interested in the Hamburg organization IMIC eV, which campaigns for education for people with a migration background.

== Achievements ==
Dayan has become a "role model" for Africans in Europe. She was on the cover of the first issue of African Heritage in Europe.

Dayan was honored in 2005 as cultural ambassador for the African continent in Germany.

She is the author for the 2014 book My Black Skin: Black. Successful. German. In My Black Skin, 25 Afro-German personalities proudly show their dark skin. The protagonists from politics and business, art and culture, science and sports report how they made it to the top. They are role models and show that, regardless of skin color and origin, you can achieve anything if you only believe in yourself. She also authored a children's book titled Odo which was published in 2010.

In 2014, she was nominated for the "Emotion Award" and won the Nana Yaa Asantewaa Award in the Media category.

== Filmography (selection) ==
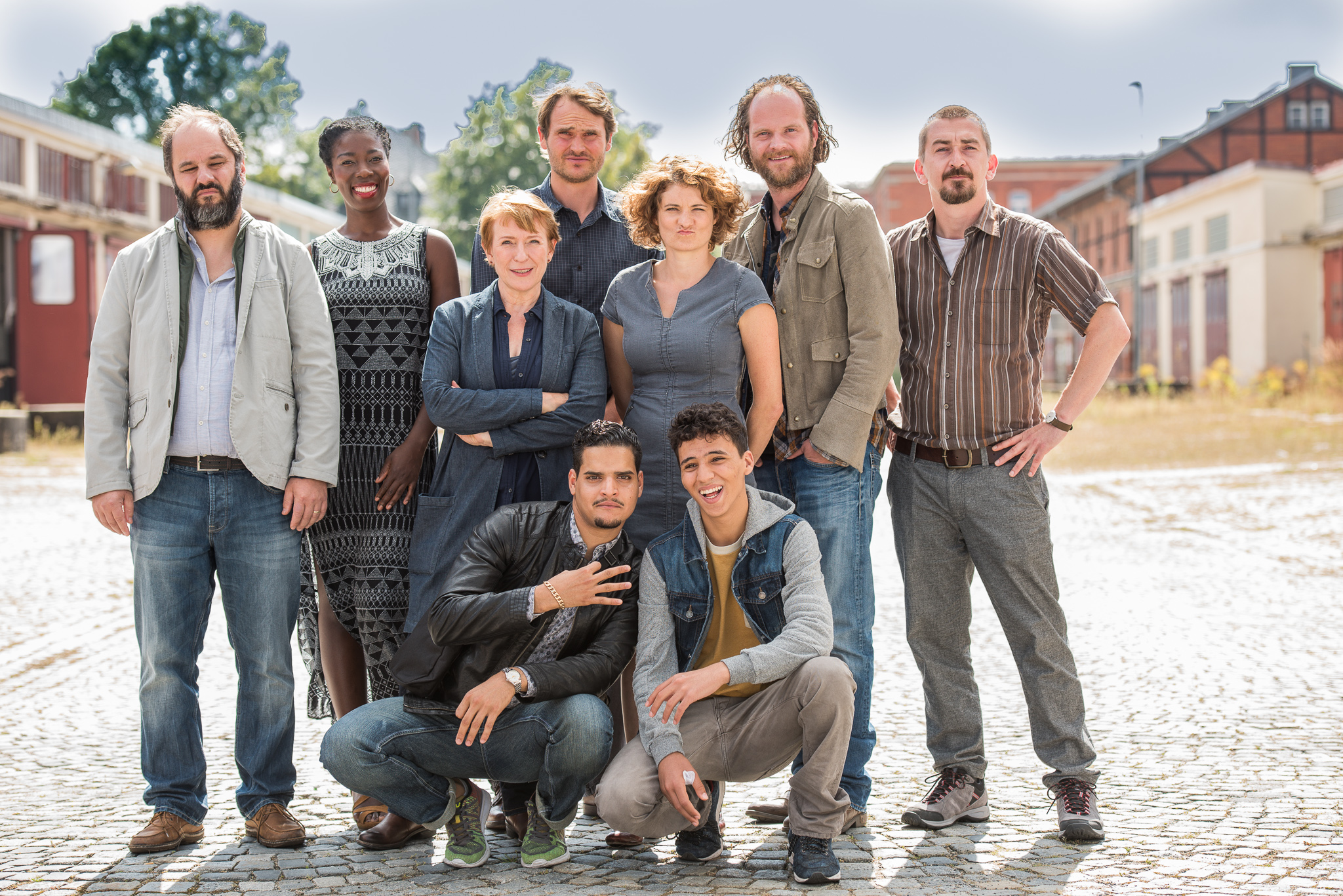
Kodua (second from left) with the cast of Tatort, 2016

=== Television ===
- 2002: Wenn zwei sich trauen
- 2003: Wahnsinnsweiber
- 2003: Shark Attack in the Mediterranean
- 2003: Balko – Death of a Driving Instructor
- 2008: Aktenzeichen XY… ungelöst
- 2008: Dr. Molly & Karl – His Fight
- 2009: Der Dicke – Behind Closed Doors
- 2010: Unter Verdacht – The Elegant Solution
- 2011: Die Pfefferkörner – Enslaved
- 2015: Männer! Alles auf Anfang – Men Economy
- 2016: Phoenixsee (6 episodes)
- 2016: Eltern allein zu Haus – Die Winters
- 2017: Tatort – In the End You Go Naked

=== Cinema ===
- 2004: The Stoning
- 2005: Lords of the Underworlds
- 2006: Crank
- 2007: Krauts, Doubts & Rock 'n' Roll
- 2012: Die elegante Lösung
- 2016: T.H.U.G: True Hustler Under God

=== University and Short Films ===
- 2006: In other Words
- 2009: Fremdenzimmer
- 2009: Peripheres Verlangen
- 2010: Wenn Bäume Puppen tragen

=== Theatre ===
- 2007: Diverting Devotion
- 2007: Barefoot in the Park
- 2013: Mephisto
