= Martin Peško =

Slovak footballer

Personal information
- Full name: Martin Peško
- Date of birth: 28 January 1972 (age 54)
- Place of birth: Slovakia
- Height: 1.88 m (6 ft 2 in)
- Position: Goalkeeper

Senior career*
Years	Team	Apps	(Gls)
1990–1996	FC Nitra		
1996–1997	MŠK Rimavská Sobota		
1997–1998	Hapoel Ashdod	30	(0)
1998–2000	Hapoel Tzafririm Holon	64	(0)
2000–2001	Maccabi Kiryat Gat	31	(0)
2001–2003	Maccabi Netanya	59	(0)
2003–2004	FC Nitra		
2004–2005	DAC Dunajská Streda		

Managerial career
- 2008: Maccabi Netanya (youth goalkeeping coach)
- * Club domestic league appearances and goals

Martin Peško is a Slovak retired footballer.

== Honours ==
- Israeli Second Division
  - 2000-01
