= Dayan Hochman-Vigil =

American attorney and politician

Member of the New Mexico House of Representatives from the 15th district
- Incumbent
- Assumed office January 15, 2019
- Preceded by: Sarah Maestas Barnes

Personal details
- Born: Santa Fe, New Mexico, U.S.
- Party: Democratic
- Education: Colorado College (BA); University of New Mexico (JD); McGill University (LL.M)

Dayan Hochman-Vigil is an American attorney and politician, currently serving as a member of the New Mexico House of Representatives from the 15th district, which includes a portion of Bernalillo County.

== Early life and education ==
Hochman-Vigil was born and raised in Santa Fe, New Mexico. She earned a Bachelor of Arts from Colorado College, a Juris Doctor from the University of New Mexico School of Law, and a Master's in Aviation and Space Law from McGill University.

== Career ==
After graduating from law school, Hochman-Vigil worked as a Public Interest Fellow at the American Civil Liberties Union in Denver. She also worked as a regulatory attorney in Washington, D.C., frequently interacting with the United States Department of Transportation, the Federal Aviation Administration, and the National Transportation Safety Board. She also served as Treasurer of the American Bar Association. Hochman-Vigil returned to New Mexico to practice law at Roybal-Mack & Cordova, PC.

In addition to her legal practice, Hochman-Vigil was elected to the New Mexico House of Representatives and assumed office on January 15, 2019, succeeding Sarah Maestas Barnes. In 2021, she was honored by Albuquerque Business First as one of its "40 Under Forty" awardees, recognizing young professionals for their leadership and contributions to the community.
