= Uche Sherif =

Nigerian footballer

Personal information
- Full name: Uche Sheriff
- Date of birth: September 3, 1983 (age 43)
- Place of birth: Nigeria
- Position: Defensive midfielder

Team information
- Current team: Sharks F.C.
- Number: 6

Senior career*
Years	Team	Apps	(Gls)
–2005	Enyimba International F.C.		
2005–2006	F.C. Ashdod		
2006–2007	Julius Berger FC		
2008	Sunshine Stars F.C.		
2008–	Sharks F.C.		
- * Club domestic league appearances and goals as of November 6, 2006

Uche Sherif (born September 3, 1983 in Nigeria) is a Nigerian footballer who is currently played for Sharks F.C.

Sherif formerly played as a defender for F.C. Ashdod, Israel since the 2005/2006 season, he came to F.C. Ashdod from Enyimba International F.C., during that season Sherif was bought by Haim Revivo, who is one of F.C. Ashdod owners. He was transferred at the end of the season to Julius Berger F.C. and in September 2008 from Sunshine Stars F.C. to Sharks F.C.
