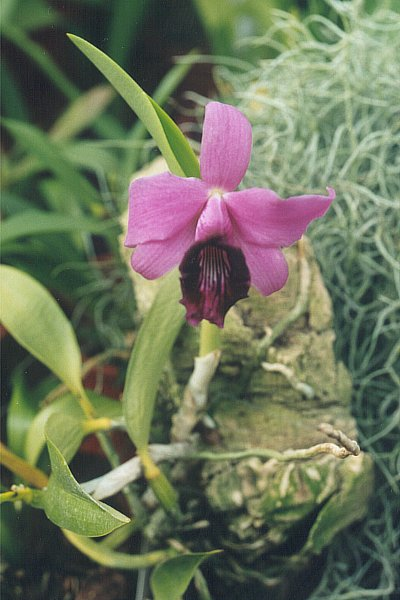
- Flower of Sophronitis dayana

Scientific classification
- Kingdom: Plantae
- Clade: Embryophytes
- Clade: Tracheophytes
- Clade: Spermatophytes
- Clade: Angiosperms
- Clade: Monocots
- Order: Asparagales
- Family: Orchidaceae
- Subfamily: Epidendroideae
- Genus: Cattleya
- Subgenus: Cattleya subg. Cattleya
- Section: Cattleya sect. Crispae
- Species: C. bicalhoi

Binomial name
- Cattleya bicalhoi Van den Berg

Synonyms
- Laelia dayana Rchb.f.; Laelia pumila var. dayana (Rchb.f.) Burbidge ex Dean; Laelia pumila ssp. dayana (Rchb.f.) Bicalho; Hadrolaelia dayana (Rchb.f.) Chiron & V.P.Castro; Sophronitis dayana (Rchb.f.) Van den Berg & M.W.Chase

= Cattleya bicalhoi =

Species of orchid

Cattleya bicalhoi, commonly known as Laelia dayana, is a species of orchid endemic to Brazil, from southern Minas Gerais to Rio de Janeiro.

Both Kew and the Royal Horticultural Society recognize this taxon as Cattleya bicalhoi.
