= Sunday Rotimi =

Nigerian footballer

Personal information
- Date of birth: 9 March 1980 (age 46)
- Place of birth: Benin City, Nigeria
- Height: 1.80 m (5 ft 11 in)
- Position: Goalkeeper

Team information
- Current team: Mekelle 70 Enderta
- Number: 12

Senior career*
Years	Team	Apps	(Gls)
1997–2000	Plateau United		
2001	Enyimba		
2001–2003	El-Kanemi Warriors		
2003–2004	Sunshine Stars FC		
2004–2005	Ironi Rishon leZion	28	(0)
2005–2006	Hapoel Ashkelon		
2006–2015	Dolphins		
2016–2018	Rivers United		
2018–	Mekelle 70 Enderta		

International career^{‡}
2001–	Nigeria	5	(0)
- * Club domestic league appearances and goals as of 26 May 2008 ‡ National team caps and goals as of 21 March 2011

Sunday Rotimi (born 9 March 1980) is a Nigerian footballer who plays as a goalkeeper for Ethiopian club Mekelle 70 Enderta.

== International ==
From 2001 to 2004 Rotimi played for the national team of Nigeria. He earned five total caps, not counting two "B" team games that were the last games Nigeria played at Lagos National Stadium. His last two appearances were shutouts over Ireland and Jamaica in the Unity Cup played at Charlton Athletic. Rotimi was called up by Nigeria coach Samson Siasia for the March 2011 Cup of Nations qualifier against Ethiopia as a cover for the injured Vincent Enyeama.
