= Julian Reinard =

German footballer (born 1983)

Personal information
- Date of birth: 5 March 1983 (age 43)
- Place of birth: Scherzingen, Switzerland
- Height: 1.87 m (6 ft 2 in)
- Position: Goalkeeper

Youth career
- SC Freiburg

Senior career*
Years	Team	Apps	(Gls)
2002–2006	SC Freiburg	11	(0)
2006	Hakoah Ramat Gan	1	(0)
2006–2007	FC Wil		
2007	BSV Schwenningen		
2007–2011	FC Neustadt		
2011	FC Kreuzlingen		
- * Club domestic league appearances and goals

Julian Reinard (born 5 March 1983) is a German former professional footballer who played as a goalkeeper.

== Career ==
Reinard first appeared in the Bundesliga on 21 March 2004 when SC Freiburg's first and second goalkeepers were injured. A year later, media and trainers viewed him as the potential future number one of Freiburg, but his performance during a 7–0 defeat against Bayern Munich and subsequent public criticism ended these prospects.

On 23 October 2006, while playing for Hakoah Amidar/Ramat Gan, he became the first German footballer to play a professional match in Israel. Due to groin problems, he left Ramat Gan and, after a brief spell at FC Wil, was without a team.
