= Michele Dayan =

Israeli footballer and manager

Michele Dayan מישל דיין
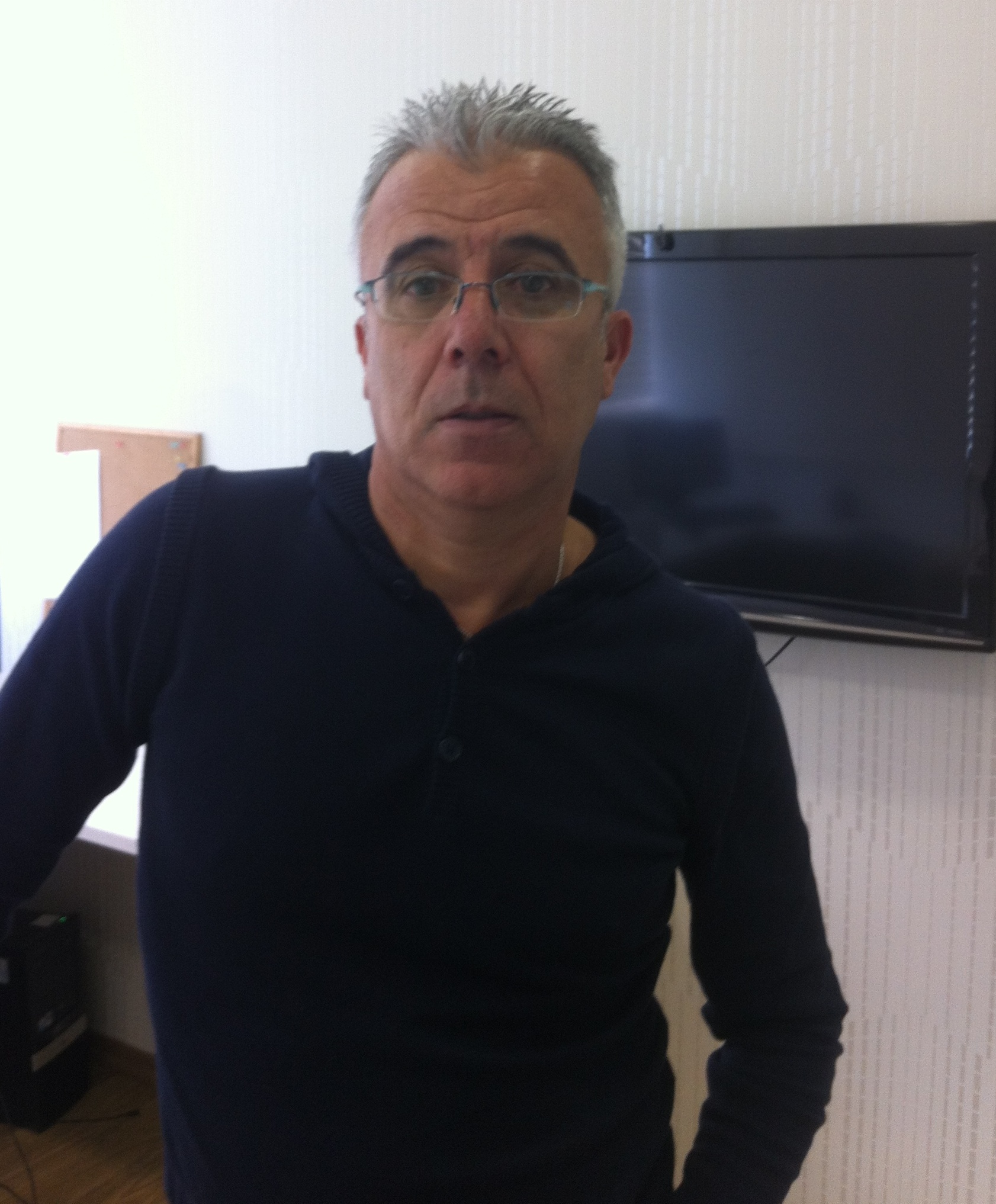

Personal information
- Full name: Michele Dayan
- Date of birth: 2 October 1961 (age 65)
- Place of birth: Jerusalem, Israel
- Position: Midfielder

Youth career
- Hapoel Jerusalem

Senior career*
Years	Team	Apps	(Gls)
	Hapoel Jerusalem		(60)
- Bnei Yehuda
- Hapoel Ashdod
- Hapoel Tzafririm Holon
- Beitar Ramla

Managerial career
- 2002–2004: Hapoel Jerusalem
- 2005–2006: Hapoel Ashkelon
- 2006–2007: Hapoel Jerusalem
- 2007–2008: Hapoel Bnei Lod
- 2008: Ironi Kiryat Shmona
- * Club domestic league appearances and goals

Michele Dayan (Hebrew: מישל דיין; born 2 October 1961) is a former Israeli footballer who works as a manager.

== Honours ==
- Liga Artzit (1):
  - 2001–02
