= Robert Badjie =

Gambian footballer

Personal information
- Full name: Robert Badjie
- Date of birth: 20 February 1984 (age 42)
- Place of birth: Banjul, Gambia
- Height: 1.95 m (6 ft 5 in)
- Position: Goalkeeper

Team information
- Current team: Ik Viljan
- Number: 1

Senior career*
Years	Team	Apps	(Gls)
2003–2008	Banjul Hawks	?	(?)
2008	Hakouah Ramat Gan	7	(0)
2009	Hapoel Jerusalem	16	(0)
2012–	Ik Viljan	0	(0)

International career^{‡}
2000–2007	Gambia U-20	2	(0)
2007–	Gambia	2	(0)
- * Club domestic league appearances and goals as of 16 November 2011 ‡ National team caps and goals as of 16 November 2011

Robert Badjie (born 20 February 1984) is a Gambian football goalkeeper who is currently playing for Swedish Division 3 side Ik Viljan.
