= Abubakari Yahuza =

Ghanaian footballer

Personal information
- Full name: Abubakari Yahuza
- Date of birth: 8 August 1983 (age 43)
- Place of birth: Sekondi-Takoradi, Ghana
- Position: Midfielder

Youth career
- 2000–2002: King Faisal Babes

Senior career*
Years	Team	Apps	(Gls)
2003–2005	King Faisal Babes	49	(0)
2005–2008	Hapoel Kfar Saba	80	(3)
2009	Hapoel Qiryat Shemona	6	(0)
2009–2012	New Edubiase United	17	(0)

International career
2004–2005	Ghana	5	(0)
- * Club domestic league appearances and goals

Ababkuri Yahuza (born 8 August 1983 in Sekondi-Takoradi) is a Ghanaian former football player.

== Career ==
After spells playing in Israel, Yahuza returned to Ghana where he played for New Edubiase United until he suffered a career-ending injury in 2012.

== International career ==
Yahuza has made several appearances for the Ghana national football team, including two qualifying matches for the 2006 FIFA World Cup. He was part of the Ghanaian 2004 Olympic football team, who exited in the first round, having finished in third place in group B.
