= Charles Vardis =

Ghanaian footballer (1985–2021)

Personal information
- Date of birth: 16 October 1985
- Place of birth: Ghana
- Date of death: 19 September 2021 (aged 35)
- Position: Defensive midfielder

Youth career
- Hearts of Oak

Senior career*
Years	Team	Apps	(Gls)
2004–2009	Hearts of Oak		
2008	→ Maccabi Herzliya (loan)	3	(0)
2009–?	New Edubiase United	2	(0)

International career
2006	Ghana U-23		
- * Club domestic league appearances and goals

Charles Vardis (16 October 1985 – 19 September 2021) was a Ghanaian professional footballer who played as a defensive midfielder.

== Club career ==
Vardis moved in summer 2008 from Hearts of Oak to Maccabi Herzliya F.C. on loan. He played for Hearts of Oak in the CAF Champions League and joined in summer 2009 newly promoted Ghana Premier League club New Edubiase United.

== International career ==
In 2006, Vardis was first called for the Black Meteors.

== Death ==
Vardis died on 19 September 2021.
