= Humberto Foguinho =

Brazilian footballer (born 1978)

Personal information
- Full name: Humberto Daniel Soares Martelo
- Date of birth: 31 October 1978 (age 48)
- Place of birth: Campinas, Brazil
- Height: 1.83 m (6 ft 0 in)
- Position: Midfielder

Senior career*
Years	Team	Apps	(Gls)
1998–2003	Ponte Preta		
2003	Internacional		
2004	SER Caxias		
2004–2005	Torino FC	12	(1)
2005–2006	Coritiba		
2006–2007	Pontevedra CF		
2008	Esporte Clube Santo André		
2008	Maccabi Netanya	8	(2)
- * Club domestic league appearances and goals

Humberto Daniel Soares Martelo , commonly known as Humberto Foguinho (born 31 October 1978) is a Brazilian former footballer.

Humberto Foguinho previously played for Ponte Preta, Coritiba and Internacional in the Campeonato Brasileiro Série A.
