= Nsumbu Mazuwa =

Congolese footballer (born 1982)

Mazowa Nsumbu
Personal information
- Full name: Emmanuel Mazuwa Nsumbu
- Date of birth: 24 September 1982 (age 44)
- Place of birth: Kinshasa, Zaïre
- Height: 1.85 m (6 ft 1 in)
- Position: Central midfielder

Senior career*
Years	Team	Apps	(Gls)
1999–2000	Tula-Mpaka	34	(0)
2000–2003	AS Vita Club	84	(0)
2003–2005	Hapoel Haifa	60	(9)
2005–2006	Beitar Jerusalem	31	(2)
2006–2007	Maccabi Netanya	29	(0)
2007–2008	Hapoel Tel Aviv	29	(0)
2008–2009	Bnei Sakhnin	13	(1)
2009	Kocaelispor	13	(0)
2009–2011	Istanbul B.B.	21	(0)
2012–2013	Samsunspor	11	(0)
2013	FELDA United F.C.	6	(0)
2015–2017	DC Motema Pembe		

International career
2002–2010	Congo DR	5	(0)
- * Club domestic league appearances and goals

Mazowa Nsumbu (born 24 September 1982) is a Congolese former professional footballer who played as a central midfielder.

Mazowa started his career in Congolese club Tula-Mpaka and later moved to play in AS Vita Club in Congo. He then tried his luck in Belgium, but was not signed by any club and moved to Israel to play for Hapoel Haifa with his friend from Vita Club, Jeff Tutuana. After two years in Hapoel Haifa he moved to Beitar Jerusalem FC with Jeff Tutuana and became one of the notable players of 2006. He played for Hapoel Tel Aviv after moving from Maccabi Natanya and after a season in Tel Aviv he moved to Bnei Sakhnin but in January 2009 he moved to Kocaelispor of the Turkey's Süper Lig and in July he moved to Istanbul B.B.

== Honours ==
- Congolese Cup: 2001
- Linafoot: 2003
- Liga Leumit: 2003–04
