= Kweku Essien =

Ghanaian footballer

Personal information
- Full name: Kweku Essien
- Date of birth: 12 December 1984 (age 41)
- Place of birth: Kumasi, Ghana
- Height: 1.85 m (6 ft 1 in)
- Position: Midfielder

Team information
- Current team: Eleven Wise
- Number: 21

Senior career*
Years	Team	Apps	(Gls)
2003–2005	Asante Kotoko		
2005–2008	F.C. Maamobi		
2006–2007	→ Accra Hearts of Oak SC (loan)	33	(5)
2007–2008	→ VfL Osnabrück (loan)	8	(1)
2008–2009	F.C. Ashdod		
2009–	Eleven Wise		

International career^{‡}
2006	Ghana	2	(0)
- * Club domestic league appearances and goals as of 7 August 2008 ‡ National team caps and goals as of 7 August 2008

Kweku Essien (born 12 December 1984 in Kumasi) is a Ghanaian football player who is currently playing for Eleven Wise of the Globacom Premier League. Essien is variable in the midfield, he can play as attacking or defensive midfielder.

== Career ==
Essien began his professional career in 2003 at Asante Kotoko but left the club in 2005 and moved to F.C. Maamobi. The central midfielder had a very good season at F.C. Maamobi in the 2005–06 Ghana Premier League season but was loaned out to Accra Hearts of Oak SC for $60,000 until June 2007. He was outstanding for King Faisal in their Premier League campaign, picking up 10 Most Valuable Player awards in the season. In 2007, he failed another trial, this time with Austrian side Sturm Graz. So far the MVP of Ghana football league for 2006–07 has failed to impress at Hertha BSC, Eintracht Frankfurt, TSG 1899 Hoffenheim, SCR Altach and now Sturm Graz. In July the same year, he was loaned out to German second division team VfL Osnabrück, but after six months in Germany he returned to F.C. Maamobi. In August 2008, was sold to F.C. Ashdod in Israel. After eight months in Israel he returned on 12 April 2009 to Ghana and signed with Eleven Wise.

== International ==
In 2006, Essien was capped two times for the Black Stars.

== Honours ==
- 2007 Most Valuable Player Glo Premier League
