= 2004–05 Israel State Cup =

Tournament details
- Country: Israel

Final positions
- Champions: Maccabi Tel Aviv (22nd Title)
- Runners-up: Maccabi Herzliya

The 2004–05 Israel State Cup was the 66th season of Israel's nationwide football cup competition and the 51st after the Israeli Declaration of Independence.

The competition was won by Maccabi Tel Aviv, who had beaten Maccabi Herzliya on penalties after 2–2 in the final.

By winning, Maccabi Tel Aviv qualified to the second round of the UEFA Cup.

== Results ==
=== Eighth Round ===
The draw for the Eighth Round was held on 27 January 2005. Most matches were played on 8 February 2005, except for the match between Hapoel Marmorek and Maccabi Tirat HaCarmel, which was played on 22 February 2005.

| Home team | Score | Away team |
|---|---|---|
| Hapoel Majd al-Krum | 0–4 | Hapoel Ashkelon |
| Beitar Giv'at Ze'ev | 2–3 | Hapoel Reineh |
| Maccabi Sha'arayim | 2–0 | Maccabi Kafr Yasif |
| Hapoel Ramat Gan | 1–0 | Maccabi Ramat Amidar |
| Hapoel Nahlat Yehuda | 2–1 | Hapoel Afula |
| Hapoel Bnei Lod | 3–4 | Maccabi Ironi Kiryat Ata |
| Bnei Baqa al-Gharbiyye | 0–4 | Maccabi Be'er Sheva |
| Hapoel Marmorek | 2–1 (a.e.t.) | Maccabi Tirat HaCarmel |

=== Ninth Round ===
Most matches were played between 1 March 2005 and 9 March 2005.

| Home team | Score | Away team |
|---|---|---|
| Hapoel Ra'anana | 3–2 | Hapoel Jerusalem |
| Maccabi Ironi Kiryat Ata | 1–3 | Hapoel Haifa |
| Hakoah Ramat Gan | 2–0 | Ironi Kiryat Shmona |
| Hapoel Nahlat Yehuda | 1–0 | Hapoel Reineh |
| Maccabi Sha'arayim | 2–3 (a.e.t.) | Hapoel Tzafririm Holon |
| Hapoel Acre | 1–1 (a.e.t.) (1–3 p.) | Maccabi Herzliya |
| Maccabi Tel Aviv | 3–1 | Hapoel Be'er Sheva |
| Maccabi Ahi Nazareth | 1–4 | Maccabi Haifa |
| Maccabi Petah Tikva | 2–1 | Hapoel Ramat Gan |
| Hapoel Kfar Saba | 2–3 | Maccabi Netanya |
| Hapoel Tel Aviv | 2–0 | Ironi Nir Ramat HaSharon |
| Hapoel Marmorek | 0–1 | Hapoel Ashkelon |
| Hapoel Rishon LeZion | 1–4 | F.C. Ashdod |
| Beitar Jerusalem | 0–1 | Hapoel Petah Tikva |
| Maccabi Be'er Sheva | 0–2 | Bnei Sakhnin |
| Bnei Yehuda | 5–1 | Hapoel Nazareth Illit |

=== Round of 16 ===
| 8 April 2005 | Hapoel Ashkelon | 6–0 | Hapoel Nahlat Yehuda | Ashkelon Municipal Stadium |
| | Radi 5'; Ben–Shushan 11'; Chacana 17'; Amar 19'; Cohen 50'; Fligman 76' | Report |

| 9 April 2005 | Hakoah Maccabi Ramat Gan | 1–0 | Bnei Sakhnin |
| | Breitner Carvalho 90+1' | Report |

| 9 April 2005 | Hapoel Ra'anana | 0–3 | Bnei Yehuda |
| | | Report | Biton 12'; Baldout 43'; Atar 75' |

| 9 April 2005 | Maccabi Herzliya | 3–0 (a.e.t.) | Hapoel Tzafririm Holon |
| | Luzon 103'; Halwani 110' (pen.); Janashvili 120' | Report |

| 9 April 2005 | Maccabi Petah Tikva | 1–0 | Hapoel Tel Aviv |
| | Udi 72' | Report |

| 9 April 2005 | Hapoel Haifa | 3–3 (3–2 p) | Maccabi Haifa | Kiryat Eliezer Stadium |
| | Tutuana 6', 62'; Hasarma 16' | Report | Tal 21' (pen.); Megrelashvili 44'; Xavier 79' | Referee: Shitrit |
| | Penalties |
| | Hasarma (penalty scored); Guiterrez (penalty scored); Elkayam (penalty missed); Nsumbu (penalty scored); Vermouth (penalty missed) | | (penalty missed) Xavier; (penalty scored) Colautti; (penalty missed) Gazal; (penalty scored) Boccoli; (penalty missed) Tal |

| 9 April 2005 | F.C. Ashdod | 2–3 | Maccabi Tel Aviv | Yud-Alef Stadium |
| | Zohar 23'; Ohayon 63' | Report | Mbamba 2', 78'; Eduardo Marques 60' |

| 11 April 2005 | Maccabi Netanya | 0–1 | Hapoel Petah Tikva | HaKufsa |
| | | Report | Shivhon 89' |

=== Quarter finals ===
| 20 April 2005 | Hakoah Maccabi Ramat Gan | 0–1 (a.e.t.) | Maccabi Petah Tikva | Winter Stadium |
| | | Report | Ganon 100' | Referee: Frost |

| 20 April 2005 | Hapoel Ashkelon | 3–0 | Bnei Yehuda | Ashkelon Municipal Stadium |
| | Chacana 33'; Amar 65'; Cohen 70' | Report | | Attendance: 4500 |

| 20 April 2005 | Hapoel Petah Tikva | 2–3 (a.e.t.) | Maccabi Herzliya |
| | Shivhon 11'; Jukan 74' | Report | Davis 85'; Titi 89'; Isiako 111' |

| 21 April 2005 | Hapoel Haifa | 1–2 | Maccabi Tel Aviv | Kiryat Eliezer Stadium |
| | Edri 34' | Report | Mbamba 3'; Prohorenkovs 89' |

=== Semi–finals ===
3 May 2005

| Hapoel Ashkelon | 1–1 (a.e.t.) | Maccabi Herzliya |
|---|---|---|
| Chacana 49' | Report | Isiako 33' |
Penalties
| Taher (penalty missed); Fligman (penalty scored); Kahlon (penalty scored); Ben-Shushan (penalty missed) | 2–4 | (penalty scored) Abu-Laben; (penalty scored) Tayer; (penalty scored) Luzon; (penalty scored) Kadoori |

Ramat Gan Stadium

3 May 2005

| Maccabi Petah Tikva | 1–2 (a.e.t.) | Maccabi Tel Aviv |
|---|---|---|
| Amer 49' | Report | Eduardo Marques 30'; Banai 113' (o.g.) |

Ramat Gan Stadium
Referee: Keinan

=== Final ===
18 May 2005

| Maccabi Tel Aviv | 2–2 (a.e.t.) | Maccabi Herzliya |
|---|---|---|
| Reis 25'; Mesika 96' | Report | Halewani 15'; Davis 111' |
Penalties
| Cohen (penalty scored); Abu Siam (penalty scored); Mishaelof (penalty scored); Reis (penalty scored); Dego (penalty scored) | 5–3 | (penalty scored) Abu-Laben; (penalty scored) Tayer; (penalty scored) Janah; (penalty missed) Rubin |

Ramat Gan Stadium
Attendance: 18500
Referee: Ya'akov
