= List of Argentine Jews =

The history of the Jews in Latin America began with seven sailors arriving in Christopher Columbus's crew. Since then, the Jewish population of Latin America has risen to more than 500,000 — most of whom live in Argentina, with large communities also present in Brazil. The following is a list of some prominent Argentine Jews:

== Athletes ==
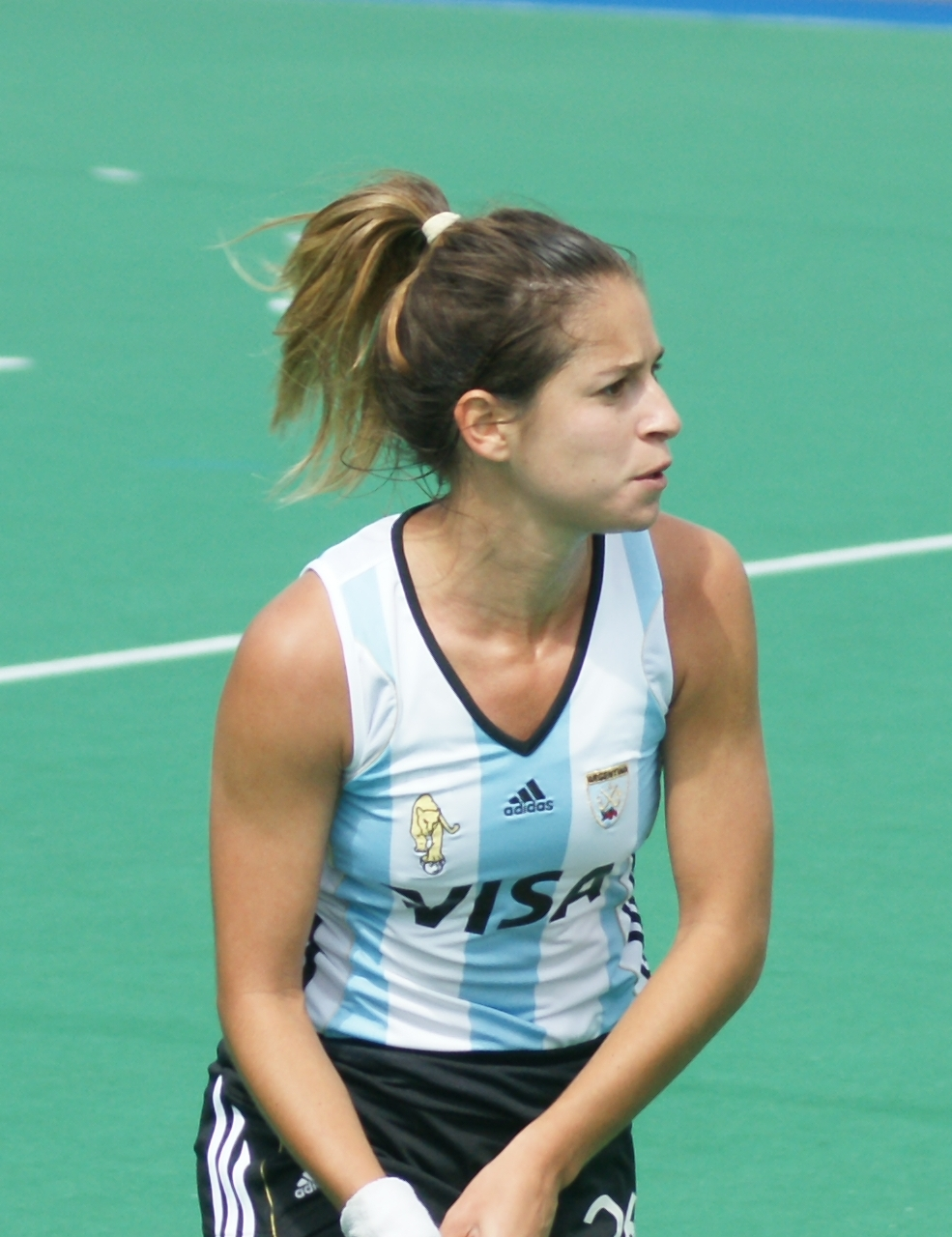
Giselle Kañevsky

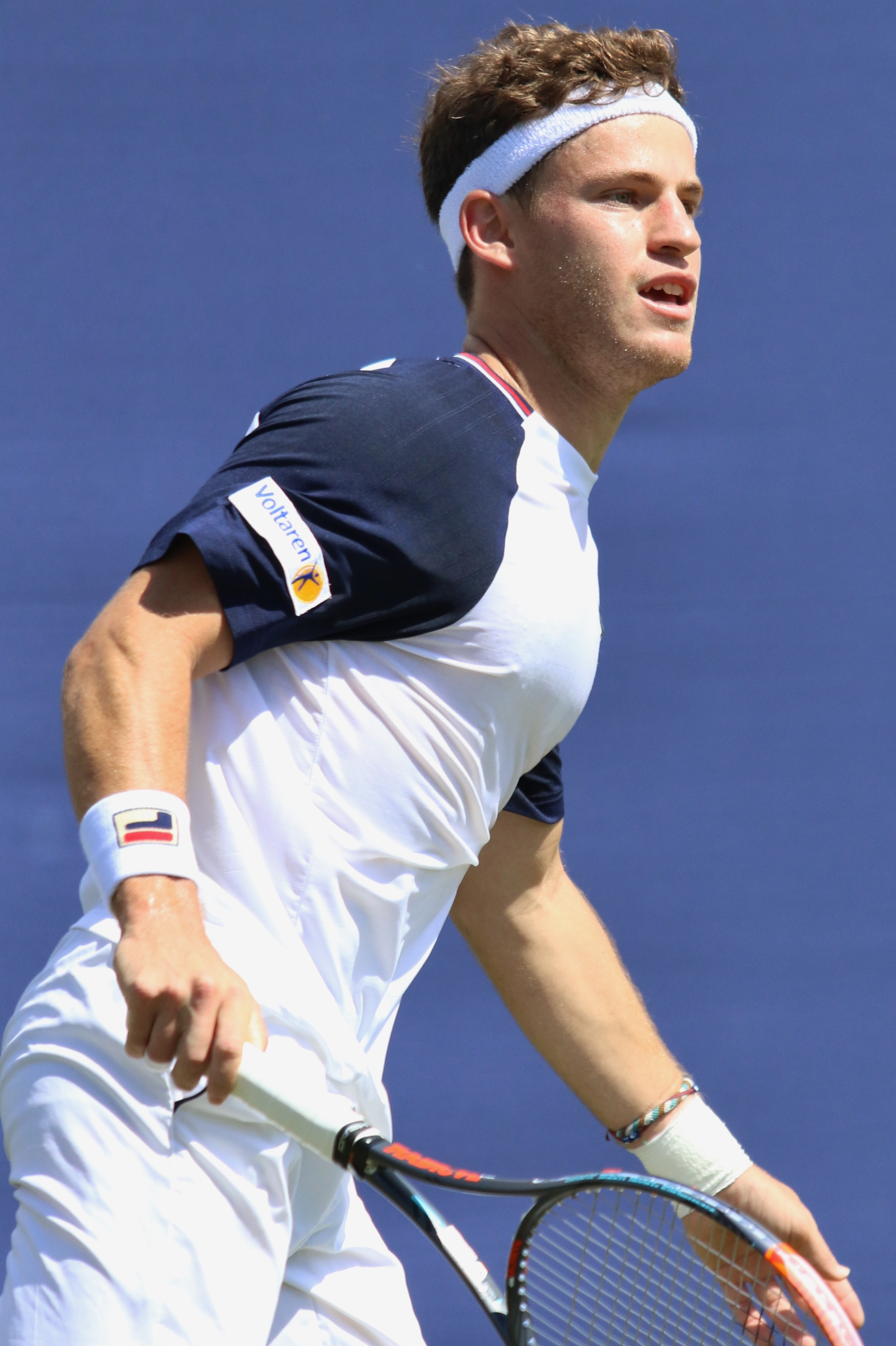
Diego Schwartzman

- Daniel Brailovsky – football player
- Carolina Duer – boxer
- Gastón Etlis – tennis player
- Nicolas Falczuk – football player
- Fernando Fligman – football player
- Naón Isidro – football player
- Martín Jaite – tennis player
- Waldo Kantor – volleyball player
- Giselle Kañevsky – field hockey player
- Valentina Kogan – handball player
- Nora Koppel – weightlifter
- Daniela Krukower – judoka
- Lucas Matías Licht – football player
- Bryan Man – football player
- Federico Mociulsky – football player
- José Pekerman – football coach
- Sergio Roitman – tennis player
- Martín Schusterman – rugby player
- Diego Schwartzman – tennis player
- Juan Pablo Sorín – football player
- Eial Strahman – football player
- Ezra Sued – football player
- Pablo Tabachnik – table tennis player
- Nicolás Tauber – football player
- Jonathan Tennenbaum – football player
- Nicolas Valansi – football player
- Alexis Weisheim – football player
- Fernando Zylberberg – field hockey player

== Businesspersons ==
- Marcos Galperin – co‑founder, chairman, president, and CEO of MercadoLibre
- Alejandro Romay – media mogul, owner of Canal 9, Radio Belgrano (es:Radio Belgrano), the Buenos Aires cable system (BAC), and Miami television station WJAN

== Entertainers ==
- Ernesto Acher – comedian and musician
- Héctor Babenco – film director
- Sebastián Borensztein – screenwriter and filmmaker
- Tato Bores – humorist
- Daniel Burman – filmmaker
- Julio Chávez – actor
- Jorge Guinzburg – journalist, theatrical producer, humorist and TV and radio host
- Marcos Mundstock – comedian, member of Les Luthier
- Daniel Rabinovich - comedian, member of Les Luthier
- Gerardo Sofovich – TV producer, humorist
- Hugo Sofovich – TV producer and humorist
- Max Berliner – Polish-Argentine actor, author, film director and theater director
- Norman Briski – well known theater actor, director and playwright
- Marcos Zucker – comedian

== Musicians ==
- Martha Argerich – concert pianist
- Daniel Barenboim – conductor and pianist
- Mario Davidovsky – composer
- Giora Feidman – klezmer musician
- Max Glücksmann – pioneer of the Argentine music and film industries
- Osvaldo Golijov – classical composer
- Alejandro Lerner – singer-songwriter
- Cesar Lerner – film composer
- Daniel Rabinovich – musician and entertainer
- Lalo Schifrin – composer
- Oscar Strasnoy – composer and conductor
- Andrés Calamaro – singer-songwriter

== Politicians ==
- José Alperovich – former governor of Tucumán Province
- Tania Bíder – revolutionary fighter
- Myriam Bregman – congresswoman
- Dani Dayan – Argentine-born Israeli politician
- Beatriz Rojkés de Alperovich – former provisional president of the Senate
- Daniel Filmus – government minister and former senator
- Itai Hagman – student leader and congressman
- Carlos Heller – banker and congressman
- César Jaroslavsky – former national congressman
- Axel Kicillof – governor of Buenos Aires Province
- Héctor Timerman – journalist, human rights activist and diplomat, former foreign minister
- Hugo Yasky – trade unionist and congressman

== Religion ==
- Sergio Bergman – rabbi, politician, pharmacist, writer and social activist
- Abraham Skorka – rabbi and biophysicist
- Isaac Sacca – rabbi

== Scientists ==
- László Bíró – inventor of the ballpoint pen
- César Milstein – immunologist, Nobel Prize in Medicine winner
- Gregory Chaitin – mathematician
- Beppo Levi – mathematician
- Cora Sadosky – mathematician
- Manuel Sadosky – mathematician

== Writers ==
- Marcos Aguinis – journalist, writer
- Marcelo Birmajer – writer
- Isidoro Blaisten – writer
- Sergio Chejfec – writer
- León Dujovne – writer, philosopher, journalist, essayist
- Samuel Eichelbaum – writer
- Juan Gelman – poet
- Alberto Gerchunoff – writer
- Noé Jitrik – essayist, literary critic
- Alberto Manguel – novelist and essayist
- Alejandra Pizarnik – poet
- Andrés Rivera – born Marcos Ribak, novelist
- Alejandro Rozitchner – essayist
- Ana María Shua – writer
- César Tiempo – born Israel Zeitlin, writer and screenwriter
- Jacobo Timerman – political commentator, journalist
- Bernardo Verbitsky – novelist
- Horacio Verbitsky – journalist
- Federico Andahazi – writer

== Others ==
- Mario Blejer – economist
- Raymundo Gleyzer – a cinema director kidnapped by the Argentine junta
- Miguel Najdorf – Polish-Argentine chess grandmaster
- Raquel Partnoy – painter
- Naomi Preizler – fashion model and artist
- Alberto Nisman – a lawyer who worked as a federal prosecutor, noted for being the chief investigator of the 1994 car bombing of the Jewish center in Buenos Aires, which killed 85 people, the worst terrorist attack in Argentina's history
- Damián Szifron – film and television director and screenwriter

== See also ==
- History of the Jews in Argentina
- List of Latin American Jews
- List of Argentines
- List of Jews
