= List of Harper's Bazaar Argentina cover models =

This list of Harper's Bazaar Argentina cover models (2011–2017; 2018–2019) is a catalog of cover models who have appeared on the cover of Harper's Bazaar Argentina, the Argentine edition of American fashion magazine Harper's Bazaar.

== 2011 ==
Issue	Cover model	Photographer
May	Naomi Preizler	Pat Battellini
June	Milagros Schmoll	Pat Battellini
July	Enikő Mihalik	Ben Hassett
August	Valeria Garcia	Pat Battellini
September	Tallulah Morton	Santiago Albanell
October	Tatiana Cotliar	Santiago Albanell
November	Sabrina Ioffreda	Pat Battellini
December	Lyoka Tyagnereva	Pat Battellini

== 2012 ==
Issue	Cover model	Photographer
January	Elisa Sednaoui	Nico Bustos
February	Dana Drori	Santiago Albanell
March	Magda Laguinge	Pat Battellini
April	Candice Swanepoel	Koray Birand
May	Naomi Preizler	Pat Battellini
June	Celeste Cid	Nacho Ricci
July	Penélope Cruz	Terry Richardson
August	Daria Zhemkova	Nacho Ricci
September	Tatiana Cotliar	Pat Battellini
October	Natalia Oreiro	Santiago Albanell
November	Sabrina Garciarena	Nacho Ricci
December	Magda Laguinge	Luciana Val & Franco Musso

== 2013 ==
Issue	Cover model	Photographer
January	Linda Vojtová	Pavel Havlicek
February	Olivia Palermo	Elliston Lutz
March	Lara Stone	Kacper Kasprzyk
April	Camila Castares	Pat Battellini
May	Carla Peterson	Santiago Albanell
June	Pau Bertolini	Pat Battellini
July	Leonora Balcarce	Santiago Albanell
August	Milagros Schmoll	Pat Battellini
September	Scarlett Johansson	Karl Lagerfeld
October	Naomi Preizler	Pat Battellini
November	Adriana Lima & Tyson Ritter	Max von Gumppenberg & Patrick Bienert
December	Carla Ciffoni	Pat Battellini

== 2014 ==
Issue	Cover model	Photographer
January	Stefanie Nazoyan	Chino Moro
February	Valeriane Le Moi	Pat Battellini
March	Rosie Huntington-Whiteley	Karl Lagerfeld
April	Romina Lanaro	Pat Battellini
May	Valeria Garcia	Pat Battellini
June	Kate Moss	Terry Richardson
July	Tetyana Melnychuk	Pat Battellini
August	Cecilia Méndez	Pat Battellini
September	Lady Gaga	Sebastian Faena
October	Charlize Theron	Nico Bustos
November	Sabrina Ioffreda	Luciana Val & Franco Musso
December	Martina Correa	Chino Moro

== 2015 ==
Issue	Cover model	Photographer
January	Lais Oliveira	Chino Moro
February	Georgia May Jagger	Nico Bustos
March	Mica Argañaraz	Sebastian Faena
April	Carla Ciffoni	Luciana Val & Franco Musso
May	Cameron Traiber	Gustavo Di Mario
June	Benjamín Vicuña	Santiago Albanell
July	Milagros Schmoll	Luciana Val & Franco Musso
August	Alexa Chung	Pat Battellini
September	Katy Perry	Jean-Paul Goude
October	Dolores Fonzi	Santiago Albanell
November	Mica Argañaraz	Luciana Val & Franco Musso
December	Cynthia Arrebola	Luciana Val & Franco Musso

== 2016 ==
Issue	Cover model	Photographer
January	Alina Baikova	Antoine Verglas
February	Melina Gesto	Santiago Albanell
March	Maria Senko	Pat Battellini
April	Julieta Cardinali	Luciana Val & Franco Musso
May	Sofía Sanchez de Betak	Luciana Val & Franco Musso
June	Jennifer Lawrence	Mario Sorrenti
July	Melina Gesto	Santiago Albanell
August	Milagros Ganame	Pat Battellini
September	Kanye West & Kim Kardashian	Karl Lagerfeld
October	Valentina Wende & Clara Etcheverry	Luciana Val & Franco Musso
November	Melina Gesto	Pedro Quintana
December	Señorita Bimbo	Gustavo Di Mario

== 2017 ==
Issue	Cover model	Photographer
January	Clara Alonso	Xavi Gordo
February	Madonna	Luigi & Iango
March	Dolores Fonzi	Luciana Val & Franco Musso
April	Jane Fonda	Nino Muñoz
May	Rocio Marconi	Gustavo Di Mario

== 2018 ==
Issue	Cover model	Photographer
December/January 2019	Mariana Zaragoza	Iván Aguirre

== 2019 ==
Issue	Cover model	Photographer
February	Winnie Harlow	Jacques Burga
March	Fernán Mirás (never published)	Pedro Quintana
