= 2004–05 Toto Cup Leumit =

Toto Cup Leumit
- Season: 2004–05
- Champions: Maccabi Netanya

The 2004–05 Toto Cup Leumit was the 16th time the cup was being contested as a competition for the second tier in the Israeli football league system, and the first time since 1998–99 that the competition was contested as a separate competition.

The competition was won by Maccabi Netanya, who had beaten Hapoel Kfar Saba 3–2 on penalties after 1–1 in the final.

== Format ==
The 12 Israeli Premier League clubs were split into three groups, each with 4 clubs. The two top clubs in each group, Along with the two best third-placed clubs, advanced to the quarter-finals.

== Group stage ==
The matches were played from 6 August to 30 November 2004.

=== Group A ===
Pos	Team	Pld	W	D	L	GF	GA	GD	Pts	HJE	HTZ	IKS	HAC
1	Hapoel Jerusalem (A)	6	3	0	3	9	9	0	9		1–0	4–3	1–2
2	Hapoel Tzafririm Holon (A)	6	2	2	2	10	9	+1	8	1–0		2–3	3–3
3	Ironi Kiryat Shmona (A)	6	2	2	2	10	10	0	8	1–2	0–0		1–1
4	Hapoel Acre	6	2	2	2	11	12	−1	8	2–1	2–4	1–2	

Source: Israel Toto Cup 2004/05
Rules for classification: 1st points; 2nd goal difference; 3rd matches won; 4th goals scored; 5th head-to-head; 6th decision match
(A) Advanced to quarter-finals

=== Group B ===
Pos	Team	Pld	W	D	L	GF	GA	GD	Pts	HRH	HKS	MHE	HRL
1	Hapoel Ramat HaSharon (A)	6	3	2	1	9	5	+4	11		3–3	1–1	2–0
2	Hapoel Kfar Saba (A)	6	3	2	1	9	7	+2	11	1–0		1–0	2–0
3	Maccabi Herzliya (A)	6	3	1	2	8	6	+2	10	0–2	4–2		2–0
4	Hapoel Rishon LeZion	6	0	1	5	0	8	−8	1	0–1	0–0	0–1	

Source: Israel Toto Cup 2004/05
Rules for classification: 1st points; 2nd goal difference; 3rd matches won; 4th goals scored; 5th head-to-head; 6th decision match
(A) Advanced to quarter-finals

=== Group C ===
Pos	Team	Pld	W	D	L	GF	GA	GD	Pts	MNE	HRA	MAN	HMR
1	Maccabi Netanya (A)	6	4	2	0	15	6	+9	14		1–1	4–2	0–0
2	Hapoel Ra'anana (A)	6	2	2	2	9	10	−1	8	0–4		2–0	3–0
3	Maccabi Ahi Nazareth	6	1	2	3	8	12	−4	5	2–3	2–2		1–1
4	Hakoah Amidar Ramat Gan	6	1	2	3	5	9	−4	5	1–3	3–1	0–1	

Source: Israel Toto Cup 2004/05
Rules for classification: 1st points; 2nd goal difference; 3rd matches won; 4th goals scored; 5th head-to-head; 6th decision match
(A) Advanced to quarter-finals

== Elimination rounds ==
=== Quarter-finals ===
Home team	Score	Away team
Hapoel Jerusalem	1–2	Maccabi Netanya
Hapoel Ramat HaSharon	1–3	Hapoel Kfar Saba
Hapoel Tzafririm Holon	1–0	Maccabi Herzliya
Hapoel Ra'anana	2–1	Ironi Kiryat Shmona

=== Semi-finals ===
19 January 2005	Hapoel Kfar Saba	3–0	Hapoel Ra'anana	Ness Ziona
	Weisheim 63'; Dahan 82', 84'	Report (in Hebrew)		Stadium: Ness Ziona Stadium; Attendance: 200

19 January 2005	Maccabi Netanya	1–0	Hapoel Tzafririm Holon	Ness Ziona
	Abdul Aziz 49'	Report (in Hebrew)		Stadium: Ness Ziona Stadium; Attendance: 200

=== Final ===
15 February 2015

Hapoel Kfar Saba	1–1 (a.e.t.)	Maccabi Netanya
Silva 45'	Report (in Hebrew)	Abdul Aziz 36'
Penalties
	2–3

Herzliya Municipal Stadium

== See also ==
- 2004–05 Toto Cup Al
- 2004–05 Toto Cup Artzit
