= 2003–04 Toto Cup Artzit =

Toto Cup Artzit
- Season: 2003–04
- Champions: Hapoel Ramat HaSharon

The 2003–04 Toto Cup Artzit was the 5th time the cup was being contested as a competition for the third tier in the Israeli football league system.

The competition was won by Hapoel Ramat HaSharon, who had beaten Hapoel Acre 2–1 on penalties after 0–0 in the final.

== Group stage ==
=== Group A ===
Pos	Team	Pld	W	D	L	GF	GA	GD	Pts	HAC	HHE	HBN	IKA	HAS	HMJ
1	Hapoel Acre (A)	10	9	1	0	22	5	+17	28	—	3–3	3–0	3–0	3–0	3–1
2	Hapoel Herzliya (A)	10	4	4	2	16	10	+6	16	0–1	—	0–0	0–0	1–2	3–1
3	Hapoel Beit She'an	10	3	3	4	6	13	−7	12	0–2	0–3	—	1–0	2–0	1–0
4	Maccabi Kiryat Ata	10	2	4	4	13	12	+1	10	1–2	0–1	1–1	—	3–0	0–2
5	Hapoel Ashkelon	10	3	1	6	17	20	−3	10	0–1	2–4	3–0	3–3	—	5–0
6	Ihud Bnei Majd al-Krum	10	2	1	7	9	23	−14	7	0–1	1–1	1–2	0–5	3–2	—

Source: rsssf.com (in Hebrew)
Rules for classification: 1st points; 2nd goal difference; 3rd matches won; 4th goals scored; 5th head-to-head; 6th decision match
(A) Advanced to the Semifinals

=== Group B ===
Pos	Team	Pld	W	D	L	GF	GA	GD	Pts	HRH	MKK	BST	HMK	MRA	HTR
1	Hapoel Ramat HaSharon (A)	10	8	1	1	23	5	+18	25	—	5–1	2–2	2–0	3–0	3–0
2	Maccabi Kafr Kanna (A)	10	6	0	4	19	14	+5	18	0–1	—	2–1	2–0	3–1	2–0
3	Beitar Shimshon Tel Aviv	10	5	2	3	28	14	+14	17	0–3	3–1	—	5–0	3–2	3–0
4	Hapoel Marmorek	10	4	1	5	10	21	−11	13	2–0	0–5	3–2	—	0–2	2–1
5	Maccabi Ramat Amidar	10	3	1	6	12	21	−9	10	0–1	1–2	0–8	1–1	—	2–0
6	Hapoel Tira	10	1	1	8	5	22	−17	4	0–3	2–1	1–1	1–2	0–3	—

Source: rsssf.com (in Hebrew)
Rules for classification: 1st points; 2nd goal difference; 3rd matches won; 4th goals scored; 5th head-to-head; 6th decision match
(A) Advanced to the Semifinals

== Knockout rounds ==
=== Semifinals ===
7 April 2004	Hapoel Acre	3–0	Hapoel Herzliya	Ramat Gan
	Levit 55'; Baliti 74'; Gaon 85'	Report		Stadium: Ramat Gan Stadium

7 April 2004	Hapoel Ramat HaSharon	3–2	Maccabi Kafr Kanna	Ramat Gan
	Yuz 5'; Shabo 13', 24' (pen.)	Report	Brick 72'; Shukarov 75'	Stadium: Ramat Gan Stadium

=== Final ===
20 April 2004

Hapoel Acre	0–0 (a.e.t.)	Hapoel Ramat HaSharon
Penalties
	1–2

== See also ==
- 2003–04 Toto Cup Al
