= Rafi Cohen (footballer, born 1965) =

Israeli footballer and manager (born 1965)

Rafi Cohen רפי כהן
Personal information
- Full name: Refael Cohen
- Date of birth: March 2, 1965 (age 61)
- Place of birth: Jerusalem, Israel
- Position: Striker

Youth career
- 1976–1980: Beitar Jerusalem

Senior career*
Years	Team	Apps	(Gls)
1980–1982	Hapoel Jerusalem		
1982–1985	Beitar Jerusalem		
1984–1989	Maccabi Petah Tikva		
1989–1994	Hapoel Petah Tikva	48	(10)

International career
1990	Israel	2	(0)

Managerial career
- 2001–2002: Beitar Shimshon Tel Aviv
- 2002–2004: Hakoah Ramat Gan
- 2004–2005: Hapoel Ashkelon
- 2005: Hapoel Petah Tikva
- 2006: Hapoel Haifa
- 2008: Beitar Shimshon Tel Aviv
- 2008–2012: Sektzia Ness Ziona
- 2012–2013: Hakoah Amidar Ramat Gan
- 2013: Ironi Nir Ramat HaSharon
- 2016–2017: Israel (assistant manager)
- 2019: Maccabi Yavne
- * Club domestic league appearances and goals

Rafi Cohen
Medal record

Representing Israel

Football

Maccabiah Games
Bronze medal – third place	1981 Maccabiah	Football

Rafi Cohen (Hebrew: רפי כהן; born March 2, 1965) is an Israeli footballer and manager, who currently serves as the assistant manager for the Israel national football team. He played in soccer for Hapoel Jerusalem, Beitar Jerusalem, Maccabi Petah Tikva, Hapoel Petah Tikva, and the Israel national football team. He has formerly managed Beitar Shimshon Tel Aviv, Hakoah Ramat Gan, Hapoel Ashkelon, Hapoel Petah Tikva, Hapoel Haifa, Beitar Shimshon Tel Aviv, Sektzia Ness Ziona, Hakoah Amidar Ramat Gan, Ironi Nir Ramat HaSharon, and Maccabi Yavne. He won a bronze medal with Team Israel at the 1981 Maccabiah Games.

== Career ==
Born in Jerusalem, Cohen joined Beitar Jerusalem at the age of 11. As a senior, Cohen moved to Hapoel Jerusalem, where he played until he returned to Beitar, in 1982. In 1984, Cohen moved to Petah Tikva, where he played for Maccabi and Hapoel until his retirement in 1994.

Cohen was part of the Israeli team in the 1981 Maccabiah Games, winning a bronze medal, and made two appearances with the senior squad in 1990.

Following retirement from active football, Cohen stayed at Hapoel Petah Tikva as youth coach and assistant coach until 2000. In 2001, Cohen was appointed as head manager for Beitar Shimshon Tel Aviv and led the team for 3rd place in Liga Artzit, just 3 points shy of promotion. The following season, Cohen was appointed as head manager of Hakoah Ramat Gan and led the club to promotion to second tier Liga Leumit. In 2004–05, Cohen once again won promotion from Liga Artzit, this time with Hapoel Ashkelon, while leading the club to the semi-finals of the State Cup and winning the 2004–05 Toto Cup Artzit.

Following his successes in third tier Liga Artzit, Cohen was appointed to coach Hapoel Petah Tikva in the Israeli Premier League, but was sacked after 8 matches. In 2009, Cohen once again won promotion from Liga Artzit with Sektzia Ness Ziona, and kept managing the team until 2012. At the beginning of the 2013–14 season, Cohen was appointed to coach Ironi Nir Ramat HaSharon, but was sacked early after a few matches.

== Honours ==
=== As player ===
- Israel State Cup
  - Winner: 1991–92
  - Runner-up: 1990–91
- Liga Leumit (top division)
  - Runner-up: 1989–90, 1990–91
- Toto Cup Leumit
  - Winner: 1989–90, 1990–91
- Maccabiah Football Tournament
  - Bronze medal: 1981

=== As manager ===
- Liga Artzit (third tier)
  - 2002–03 (with Hakoah Ramat Gan), 2004–05 (with Hapoel Ashkelon), 2008–09 (with Sektzia Ness Ziona)
- Toto Cup Artzit
  - 2004–05 (with Hapoel Ashkelon)
