= Rafi Cohen =

Rafi or Raphi Cohen may refer to:

- Rafi Cohen (footballer, born 1965), Israeli football striker and football manager
- Rafi Cohen (footballer, born 1970), Israeli football goalkeeper
- Rafi Cohen (footballer, born 1974), Israeli football striker
- Raphi Cohen (born 1975), Israeli chef
