= 2003–04 Toto Cup Al =

Toto Cup Al
- Season: 2003–04
- Champions: Maccabi Petah Tikva

The 2003–04 Toto Cup Al was the 20th season of the third most important football tournament in Israel since its introduction. This was the 5th and final edition to be played with clubs of both Israeli Premier League and Liga Leumit clubs.

The competition began on 8 August 2003 and ended on 20 May 2003, with Maccabi Petah Tikva beating Maccabi Haifa 3–0 in the final.

== Format change ==
The 24 Israeli Premier League and Liga Leumit clubs were divided into six groups, each with four clubs, with the six group winners, along with the two best runners-up, advancing to the quarter-finals.

== Group stage ==
The matches were played from 8 August 2003 to 29 October 2003.

=== Group A ===
| Pos | Team | Pld | W | D | L | GF | GA | GD | Pts | HPT | HNI | BEI | MTA |
|---|---|---|---|---|---|---|---|---|---|---|---|---|---|
| 1 | Hapoel Petah Tikva (A) | 6 | 2 | 3 | 1 | 10 | 9 | +1 | 9 | — | 2–2 | 2–1 | 1–1 |
| 2 | Hapoel Nazareth Illit | 6 | 2 | 2 | 2 | 9 | 8 | +1 | 8 | 3–2 | — | 1–1 | 0–1 |
| 3 | Beitar Jerusalem | 6 | 2 | 2 | 2 | 7 | 7 | 0 | 8 | 1–1 | 2–1 | — | 3–1 |
| 4 | Maccabi Tel Aviv | 6 | 2 | 1 | 3 | 6 | 7 | −1 | 7 | 1–2 | 0–2 | 0–1 | — |

Source: rsssf.com (in Hebrew)
Rules for classification: 1st points; 2nd goal difference; 3rd matches won; 4th goals scored; 5th head-to-head; 6th decision match
(A) Advanced to the quarter-finals

=== Group B ===
| Pos | Team | Pld | W | D | L | GF | GA | GD | Pts | MHA | BnS | MAN | HRG |
|---|---|---|---|---|---|---|---|---|---|---|---|---|---|
| 1 | Maccabi Haifa (A) | 6 | 4 | 2 | 0 | 10 | 3 | +7 | 14 | — | 0–0 | 1–1 | 3–1 |
| 2 | Bnei Sakhnin (A) | 6 | 2 | 3 | 1 | 3 | 2 | +1 | 9 | 0–1 | — | 1–0 | 0–0 |
| 3 | Maccabi Ahi Nazareth | 6 | 2 | 1 | 3 | 7 | 8 | −1 | 7 | 1–2 | 1–2 | — | 2–1 |
| 4 | Hapoel Ramat Gan | 6 | 0 | 2 | 4 | 3 | 10 | −7 | 2 | 0–3 | 0–0 | 1–2 | — |

Source: rsssf.com (in Hebrew)
Rules for classification: 1st points; 2nd goal difference; 3rd matches won; 4th goals scored; 5th head-to-head; 6th decision match
(A) Advanced to the quarter-finals

=== Group C ===
| Pos | Team | Pld | W | D | L | GF | GA | GD | Pts | ASH | HTA | HTZ | MHE |
|---|---|---|---|---|---|---|---|---|---|---|---|---|---|
| 1 | F.C. Ironi Ashdod (A) | 6 | 3 | 3 | 0 | 17 | 4 | +13 | 12 | — | 2–2 | 10–0 | 2–0 |
| 2 | Hapoel Tel Aviv | 6 | 2 | 2 | 2 | 9 | 8 | +1 | 8 | 1–1 | — | 1–0 | 3–0 |
| 3 | Hapoel Tzafririm Holon | 6 | 1 | 3 | 2 | 3 | 12 | −9 | 6 | 0–0 | 2–0 | — | 1–1 |
| 4 | Maccabi Herzliya | 6 | 1 | 2 | 3 | 5 | 10 | −5 | 5 | 1–2 | 3–2 | 0–0 | — |

Source: rsssf.com (in Hebrew)
Rules for classification: 1st points; 2nd goal difference; 3rd matches won; 4th goals scored; 5th head-to-head; 6th decision match
(A) Advanced to the quarter-finals

=== Group D ===
| Pos | Team | Pld | W | D | L | GF | GA | GD | Pts | MNE | HRA | HMR | HKS |
|---|---|---|---|---|---|---|---|---|---|---|---|---|---|
| 1 | Maccabi Netanya (A) | 6 | 3 | 1 | 2 | 17 | 11 | +6 | 10 | — | 2–1 | 5–0 | 6–6 |
| 2 | Hapoel Ra'anana | 6 | 2 | 2 | 2 | 7 | 10 | −3 | 8 | 2–0 | — | 1–1 | 0–0 |
| 3 | Hakoah Amidar Ramat Gan | 6 | 2 | 2 | 2 | 5 | 9 | −4 | 8 | 2–1 | 0–2 | — | 0–0 |
| 4 | Hapoel Kfar Saba | 6 | 1 | 3 | 2 | 13 | 12 | +1 | 6 | | 7–1 | 0–2 | — |

Source: rsssf.com (in Hebrew)
Rules for classification: 1st points; 2nd goal difference; 3rd matches won; 4th goals scored; 5th head-to-head; 6th decision match
(A) Advanced to the quarter-finals

=== Group E ===
| Pos | Team | Pld | W | D | L | GF | GA | GD | Pts | HBS | HRL | BnY | MKG |
|---|---|---|---|---|---|---|---|---|---|---|---|---|---|
| 1 | Hapoel Be'er Sheva (A) | 6 | 4 | 2 | 0 | 18 | 2 | +16 | 14 | — | 4–0 | 4–0 | 4–1 |
| 2 | Hapoel Rishon LeZion (A) | 6 | 3 | 2 | 1 | 7 | 5 | +2 | 11 | 0–0 | — | 1–0 | 0–0 |
| 3 | Bnei Yehuda | 6 | 2 | 1 | 3 | 7 | 10 | −3 | 7 | 1–1 | 1–3 | — | 2–1 |
| 4 | Maccabi Kiryat Gat | 6 | 0 | 1 | 5 | 2 | 17 | −15 | 1 | 0–5 | 0–3 | 0–3 | — |

Source: rsssf.com (in Hebrew)
Rules for classification: 1st points; 2nd goal difference; 3rd matches won; 4th goals scored; 5th head-to-head; 6th decision match
(A) Advanced to the quarter-finals

=== Group F ===
| Pos | Team | Pld | W | D | L | GF | GA | GD | Pts | MPT | HHA | IKS | HJE |
|---|---|---|---|---|---|---|---|---|---|---|---|---|---|
| 1 | Maccabi Petah Tikva (A) | 6 | 4 | 1 | 1 | 13 | 5 | +8 | 13 | — | 1–1 | 2–0 | 4–0 |
| 2 | Hapoel Haifa | 6 | 2 | 2 | 2 | 6 | 9 | −3 | 8 | 0–5 | — | 1–2 | 1–0 |
| 3 | Ironi Kiryat Shmona | 6 | 2 | 1 | 3 | 9 | 9 | 0 | 7 | 4–0 | 0–2 | — | 2–3 |
| 4 | Hapoel Jerusalem | 6 | 1 | 2 | 3 | 5 | 10 | −5 | 5 | 0–1 | 1–1 | 1–1 | — |

Source: rsssf.com (in Hebrew)
Rules for classification: 1st points; 2nd goal difference; 3rd matches won; 4th goals scored; 5th head-to-head; 6th decision match
(A) Advanced to the quarter-finals

== Knockout rounds ==
=== Quarter-finals ===
| 11 November 2003 | Hapoel Be'er Sheva | 1–2 (a.e.t.) | Maccabi Haifa | Be'er Sheva |
| | Eliyahu 67' (pen.) | Report | Zandberg 51'; López 115' | Stadium: Vasermil Stadium |

| 11 November 2003 | Hapoel Petah Tikva | 2–3 | Maccabi Netanya | Petah Tikva |
| | Edri 46'; Salami 90' | Report | Addo 72', 88'; Tzarfati 84' | Stadium: Municipal Stadium |

| 11 November 2003 | Maccabi Petah Tikva | 2–1 | Hapoel Rishon LeZion | Ramat Gan |
| | Refua 3'; Dubrovin 42' | Report | Kabudi 8' | Stadium: Ramat Gan Stadium |

| 12 November 2003 | Bnei Sakhnin | 1–0 | F.C. Ashdod |
| 14:00 | Lima 18' | Report |

=== Semifinals ===
| 17 December 2003 | Maccabi Haifa | 2–1 | Bnei Sakhnin | Ramat Gan |
| | Biruk 39'; Michael Zandberg 59' | Report | Brassart 24' | Stadium: Ramat Gan Stadium |

| 17 December 2003 | Maccabi Petah Tikva | 3–1 | Maccabi Netanya | Ramat Gan |
| 18:45 | Tuama 45'; Sarsur 57'; Golan 65' | Report | Tzarfati 10' | Stadium: Ramat Gan Stadium |

=== Final ===
28 January 2004
19:00

| Maccabi Petah Tikva | 3–0 | Maccabi Haifa |
|---|---|---|
| Dubrovin 50'; Menashe 53'; Golan 77' | Report |

Ramat Gan Stadium
Referee: Meir Levi

== See also ==
- 2003–04 Toto Cup Artzit
