= Naón Isidro =

Argentine-Israeli footballer

Naón Isidro נאון איזידורו
Personal information
- Date of birth: 12 November 1987 (age 38)
- Place of birth: Argentina
- Position: Striker

Youth career
- Newell's Old Boys

Senior career*
Years	Team	Apps	(Gls)
2008	Hapoel Nazareth Illit	5	(0)
2008–2009	Hapoel Ashkelon	24	(5)
2009–2010	Hapoel Marmorek	?	(?)
2010–2011	Hapoel Ashkelon	?	(?)
- * Club domestic league appearances and goals as of 00:24, 13 January 2013(UTC)

Naón Isidro (Hebrew: נאון איזידורו; born 12 November 1987) is an Argentine-Israeli association football player who plays as a forward; he has been a free agent since he was released from Hapoel Ashkelon in June 2011.

== Playing career ==
Isidoro arrived in Israel and first trialled with Maccabi Netanya. Actor Dubie Gal acted as the players agent and suggested Isidoro trial with Netanya to one of the club's supporters. The club were short on strikers and were attracted by the prospect of Isidoro not counting as a foreigner because he is Jewish. Isidoro failed to impress then manager, Reuven Atar and the club decided not to sign him. Isidoro then joined Hapoel Haifa on trial before landing a spot with Hapoel Nazareth Illit.

After a year of playing in Nazareth Illit, Isidoro moved to Ashkelon to join Hapoel Ashkelon. Within a short time of starting there, Isidoro found himself in the middle of the Gaza War as bombs fell on the city. During the war, Isidoro provided interviews for the media in Argentina to give them a perspective of what was going on on the ground. It became too difficult for Isidoro that he moved to Tel Aviv until the war ended. While playing for Ashkelon, Isidoro developed a friendship and even lived together with fellow Argentine Jew, Bryan Man. at June 2011 he was released from Hapoel Ashkelon and is currently a free agent.

== Statistics ==
Club performance			League		Cup		League Cup		Continental		Total	
Season	Club	League	Apps	Goals	Apps	Goals	Apps	Goals	Apps	Goals	Apps	Goals
Israel			League		Israel State Cup		Toto Cup		Europe		Total	
2007–2008	Hapoel Nazareth Illit	Liga Leumit	5	0	0	0	0	0	0	0	5	0
2008–2009	Hapoel Ashkelon	Liga Artzit	24	5	3	0	6	0	0	0	33	5
Total	Israel		29	5	3	0	6	0	0	0	38	5
Career total			29	5	3	0	6	0	0	0	38	5
