= Lanaro =

Lanaro is a surname. Notable people with this surname include:

- Dino Lanaro (1909–1998), Italian painter
- Germán Lanaro (born 1986), Argentinian football player
- Giovanni Lanaro (born 1981), Mexican-American pole vaulter
- Gustavo Lanaro (born 1986), Argentinian football player
- Romina Lanaro (born 1986), Argentinian fashion model
