= Omar Abdulaziz =

Omar Abdulaziz (Arabic: عمر عبد العزيز) or variant spellings may refer to:

- Umar ibn Abd al-Aziz, 8th Umayyad Caliph who ruled from 717 to 720, (born 680)
- Omar Abdel Aziz, Nigerian squash player, (born 1983)
- Omar Abdel Aziz, head of the Egyptian head of the Federation of Artistic Syndicates, see Cinema of Egypt
- Omar Abdul Aziz, Nigerian footballer, (born 1985)
- Omar Abdulaziz (footballer), Saudi footballer, (born 1983)
- Omar Abdulaziz (vlogger), Saudi dissident vlogger living in exile in Montreal, Canada
- Omar Abdulaziz Al-Sonain, Saudi footballer, (born 1995)
