= Zion Cohen =

Israeli football striker

Zion Cohen (Hebrew: ציון כהן; born March 7, 1983) is an Israeli football (soccer) striker who last played for Maccabi Tel Aviv.

The 22-year-old striker came from Hapoel Ashkelon, following Hapoel Rishon LeZion F.C., scored 15 goals in Ashkelon and promoted the team together with Carlos Chacana to the second league.

In July 2005, Cohen was found to have a genetic spleen problem, which caused him to resign from soccer.
