= Shai Biruk =

Israeli footballer

Shai Biruk שי בירוק
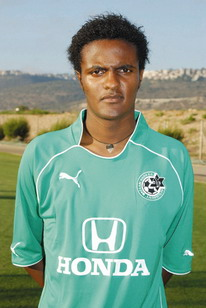

Personal information
- Date of birth: June 15, 1984 (age 42)
- Place of birth: Ethiopia
- Height: 6 ft 0 in (1.83 m)
- Position: Midfielder

Youth career
- 1999–2003: Beitar Nes Tubruk
- 2003: Ajax Amsterdam
- 2003–2004: Maccabi Haifa

Senior career*
Years	Team	Apps	(Gls)
2003–2006	Maccabi Haifa	45	(7)
2006–2007	Maccabi Netanya	20	(0)
2008	Hapoel Be'er Sheva	7	(0)
2008	Hapoel Bnei Lod	2	(0)
2011	Hapoel Ashkelon	11	(1)
2011–2012	Hapoel Kfar Saba	13	(1)

International career^{‡}
2000–2001	Israel U16	6	(0)
2001–2003	Israel U19	8	(3)
2004–2005	Israel U21	3	(0)
- * Club domestic league appearances and goals as of 1 July 2006 ‡ National team caps and goals as of 1 July 2006

Shai Biruk (Hebrew: שי בירוק; born June 15, 1984) is a footballer. Born in Ethiopia, he represented Israel at youth level.

== Career ==
Biruk accepted an offer to join the youth system in Amsterdam only to come back to Israel six months later citing homesickness. During his time at Ajax, he met a fellow Jewish Israeli footballer named Daniël de Ridder and was the first to report on Ajax having a Jewish Israeli on their books to the Israel Football Association.

He was the subject of a short tug of war between Tottenham Hotspur, Ajax Amsterdam and Maccabi Haifa FC. He decided to commit to Haifa and joined their youth team before making a call up to the full side about two seasons later. After three years in the full side, his contract was not renewed so he left on a free transfer. On August 21, 2006, he agreed to a one-year deal with Maccabi Netanya.

In the start of 2008 he moved to Hapoel Be'er Sheva. In July 2008 Biruk moved to Hapoel Bnei Lod where he last played football professionally, though he has never announced retirement.

As of June 2, 2010 Biruk is on trial with FC Thun. After a trial that lasted 4 months he is due to sign a contract with the club in January 2011, but in the end he signed for Hapoel Ashkelon.

== Honours ==
- Israeli Premier League:
  - Winner (3): 2003–04, 2004-05, 2005-06
  - Runner-up (1): 2006-07
