= Jonathan Tennenbaum =

Argentine-Israeli footballer

Jonny Tennenbaum ג'וני טננבאום
Personal information
- Full name: Jonathan Tennenbaum יונתן טננבאום
- Date of birth: 1 September 1979 (age 47)
- Place of birth: Argentina
- Position: Defender

Team information
- Current team: Hapoel F.C. Sandala Gilboa

Senior career*
Years	Team	Apps	(Gls)
2003–2004	Hakoah Ramat Gan	20	(2)
2004–2005	Hapoel Ashkelon	17	(5)
2005–2006	Maccabi Kiryat Ata	25	(1)
2006–2009	Hapoel Ra'anana	80	(3)
2009–2011	Hapoel Acre	27	(1)
2011–2015	Hapoel Afula	103	(0)
2015–2016	Maccabi Kiryat Ata	28	(0)
2016–2017	Hapoel F.C. Sandala Gilboa	27	(0)
- * Club domestic league appearances and goals

Jonathan "Jonny" Tennenbaum (Hebrew: יונתן "ג'וני" טננבאום; born 1 September 1979) is an Argentine-Israeli former association football player.

== Playing career ==
Tennenbaum arrived in Israel as part of the Argentine football team for the Maccabiah Games. Afterward one season with Hakoah Ramat Gan, he signed with Hapoel Ashkelon and played alongside fellow Argentine, Carlos Chacana.

After a successful time with Ashkelon, Tennenbaum made a stop with Maccabi Kiryat Ata before landing with Hapoel Ra'anana. The Argentine became a fixture in the Ra'anana line-up. In his last season with the club, Tennenbaum scored the crucial goal that promoted them to the Israeli Premier League and was named player of the week. Tennenbaum left Ra'anana after the season for Hapoel Acre.

== Statistics ==
Club performance			League		Cup		League Cup		Continental		Total	
Season	Club	League	Apps	Goals	Apps	Goals	Apps	Goals	Apps	Goals	Apps	Goals
Israel			League		Israel State Cup		Toto Cup		Europe		Total	
2006–2007	Hapoel Ra'anana	Liga Leumit	31	1	1	0	5	0	0	0	37	1
2007–2008	Hapoel Ra'anana	Liga Leumit	29	1	1	0	8	0	0	0	38	1
2008–2009	Hapoel Ra'anana	Liga Leumit	20	1	1	0	6	0	0	0	27	1
2009–2010	Hapoel Acre	Ligat ha'Al	26	1	0	0	5	0	0	0	31	1
Total	Israel											
Career total												

== Honours ==
- Liga Artzit (1):
  - 2004–05
- Liga Alef (North) (1):
  - 2012-13
