= 2008–09 Liga Artzit =

Israeli football season 2008–2009

The 2008–09 Liga Artzit season started on 5 September 2008 and ended on 29 May 2009.

Two teams from Liga Alef were promoted at the end of the previous season: Hapoel Umm al-Fahm and Maccabi Ironi Bat Yam along with two teams relegated from Liga Leumit: Hapoel Nazareth Illit and Hapoel Rishon LeZion.
The two teams relegated to Liga Alef were Hapoel Kfar Shalem and Maccabi HaShikma/Ramat Hen.

It was scheduled to be the last season before the league closing, as the top two divisions are both expanded to 16 clubs. As a result of the restructuring, the top seven clubs were promoted to Liga Leumit, whilst the eight-placed club played in a play-off against the 11th-placed club in Liga Leumit for a place in that division. The losers of that match and the bottom four clubs in Liga Artzit were relegated to Liga Alef, which has regained its status as the third tier of Israeli football.

== League table ==
Pos	Team	Pld	W	D	L	GF	GA	GD	Pts	Promotion or relegation
1	Sektzia Nes Tziona (C, P)	33	19	10	4	62	25	+37	67	Promotion to Liga Leumit
2	Hapoel Ashkelon (P)	33	18	9	6	46	24	+22	63	Promotion to Liga Leumit
3	Hapoel Marmorek (P)	33	17	9	7	60	28	+32	60	Promotion to Liga Leumit
4	Hapoel Rishon LeZion (P)	33	16	8	9	58	33	+25	56	Promotion to Liga Leumit
5	Ironi Bat Yam (P)	33	16	7	10	42	31	+11	55	Promotion to Liga Leumit
6	Beitar Shimshon Tel Aviv (P)	33	15	8	10	44	34	+10	53	Promotion to Liga Leumit
7	Hapoel Nazareth Illit (P)	33	14	7	12	37	25	+12	49	Promotion to Liga Leumit
8	Maccabi Kafr Kanna (R)	33	12	8	13	40	42	−2	44	Qualification for promotion play-offs
9	Hapoel Bnei Tamra (R)	33	8	9	16	41	45	−4	33	Relegation to Liga Alef
10	Hapoel Umm al-Fahm (R)	33	7	10	16	22	59	−37	30 (Note: Hapoel Umm al-Fahm were deducted 1 point due to contravention in the budgets control.)	Relegation to Liga Alef
11	Hapoel Bnei Jadeidi (R)	33	5	5	23	25	60	−35	20	Relegation to Liga Alef
12	Maccabi Ironi Tirat HaCarmel (R)	33	3	6	24	30	101	−71	15	Relegation to Liga Alef

Source: The Israel Football Association
Rules for classification: 1st points; 2nd goal difference; 3rd matches won; 4th goals scored; 5th head-to-head; 6th decision match.
(C) Champions; (P) Promoted; (R) Relegated

=== Positions by round ===
Team ╲ Round	1	2	3	4	5	6	7	8	9	10	11	12	13	14	15	16	17	18	19	20	21	22	23	24	25	26	27	28	29	30	31	32	33
Sektzia Nes Tziona	4	2	6	6	8	5	7	7	6	7	7	4	3	2	2	2	2	2	2	2	1	1	1	1	1	1	1	1	1	1	1	1	1
Hapoel Ashkelon	7	3	2	1	1	1	1	1	1	1	1	1	1	1	1	1	1	1	1	1	2	2	2	2	2	2	2	3	2	2	2	2	2
Hapoel Marmorek	2	6	4	2	6	4	6	6	7	6	5	6	6	7	7	6	7	6	6	6	6	6	5	6	5	4	4	5	4	4	4	3	3
Hapoel Rishon LeZion	3	1	3	7	5	7	5	4	4	2	2	2	2	4	3	3	3	3	3	3	3	3	3	3	3	3	3	2	3	3	3	4	4
Ironi Bat Yam	11	11	9	8	4	6	4	5	5	3	3	3	4	5	6	4	5	7	7	7	7	7	6	4	4	5	6	6	6	6	6	6	5
Beitar Shimshon Tel Aviv	8	4	1	3	2	2	2	2	2	4	4	5	5	3	5	5	6	5	4	5	5	5	7	5	6	6	5	4	5	5	5	5	6
Hapoel Nazareth Illit	9	5	7	4	3	3	3	3	3	5	6	7	7	6	4	7	4	4	5	4	4	4	4	7	7	7	7	7	8	7	7	7	7
Maccabi Kafr Kanna	1	7	5	5	7	8	8	8	8	8	8	8	8	8	8	8	8	8	8	8	8	9	9	9	9	8	8	8	7	8	8	8	8
Hapoel Bnei Tamra	5	10	11	10	10	11	9	10	11	11	10	10	10	10	10	10	10	10	10	10	10	8	8	8	8	9	9	9	9	9	9	9	9
Hapoel Umm al-Fahm	12	8	8	9	9	9	10	9	9	9	9	9	9	9	9	9	9	9	9	9	9	10	10	10	10	10	10	10	10	10	10	10	10
Hapoel Bnei Jadeidi	10	12	12	12	12	12	12	12	12	12	12	12	12	12	12	12	12	12	12	12	12	12	11	11	11	11	11	11	11	11	11	11	11
Maccabi Ironi Tirat HaCarmel	6	9	10	11	11	10	11	11	10	10	11	11	11	11	11	11	11	11	11	11	11	11	11	12	12	12	12	12	12	12	12	12	12

Source: The Israel Football Association

== Results ==
The schedule consisted of three rounds. During first two rounds, each team played each other once home and away for a total of 22 matches. The pairings of the third round were then set according to the standings after first two rounds, giving every team a third game against each opponent for a total of 33 games per team.

=== First and second round ===
Home \ Away	BTA	HBT	HAS	HBJ	HNI	HMK	HRL	HUF	IBY	MKK	MTC	SNT
Beitar Shimshon Tel Aviv		1–0	0–0	2–0	2–1	1–2	3–2	1–1	0–1	2–1	4–0	0–2
Hapoel Bnei Tamra	1–1		1–2	3–1	0–2	3–0	1–2	0–0	3–2	0–0	3–1	0–0
Hapoel Ashkelon	2–1	1–0		2–1	2–0	0–0	0–2	3–1	1–1	4–0	2–2	2–0
Hapoel Bnei Jadeidi	0–1	0–2	0–1		0–1	1–1	1–2	0–1	0–2	2–3	2–2	0–3
Hapoel Nazareth Illit	0–0	1–1	2–1	0–0		2–0	0–0	0–0	1–0	4–1	5–0	1–2
Hapoel Marmorek	2–0	4–1	0–1	4–1	1–0		2–1	0–1	4–0	0–0	0–0	3–3
Hapoel Rishon LeZion	0–1	0–0	0–1	1–1	2–0	0–0		2–2	0–0	4–1	6–1	3–0
Hapoel Umm al-Fahm	0–2	0–2	1–0	1–0	0–1	0–2	1–1		0–2	1–1	2–1	0–0
Ironi Bat Yam	1–0	2–1	1–0	1–0	0–2	2–1	0–2	0–0		0–0	6–0	1–3
Maccabi Kafr Kanna	0–0	0–0	1–2	3–1	0–1	3–1	0–0	0–0	1–0		3–1	3–0
Maccabi Ironi Tirat HaCarmel	0–2	1–1	2–2	1–2	0–2	1–3	1–4	2–2	0–2	3–1		0–2
Sektzia Nes Tziona	0–0	3–2	0–0	4–0	2–0	0–0	0–1	5–0	3–2	1–0	2–0	

Source: The Israel Football Association
Legend: Blue = home team win; Yellow = draw; Red = away team win.

=== Third round ===
Key numbers for pairing determination (number marks position after 22 games):

Rounds
23rd	24th	25th	26th	27th	28th	29th	30th	31st	32nd	33rd
3 – 12; 4 – 2; 5 – 1; 6 – 11; 7 – 10; 8 – 9	12 – 9; 10 – 8; 11 – 7; 1 – 6; 2 – 5; 3 – 4	4 – 12; 5 – 3; 6 – 2; 7 – 1; 8 – 11; 9 – 10	12 – 10; 11 – 9; 1 – 8; 2 – 7; 3 – 6; 4 – 5	5 – 12; 6 – 4; 7 – 3; 8 – 2; 9 – 1; 10 – 11	12 – 11; 1 – 10; 2 – 9; 3 – 8; 4 – 7; 5 – 6	6 – 12; 7 – 5; 8 – 4; 9 – 3; 10 – 2; 11 – 1	1 – 12; 2 – 11; 3 – 10; 4 – 9; 5 – 8; 6 – 7	12 – 7; 8 – 6; 9 – 5; 10 – 4; 11 – 3; 1 – 2	2 – 12; 3 – 1; 4 – 11; 5 – 10; 6 – 9; 7 – 8	12 – 8; 9 – 7; 10 – 6; 11 – 5; 1 – 4; 2 – 3

Home \ Away	BTA	HBT	HAS	HBJ	HNI	HMK	HRL	HUF	IBY	MKK	MTC	SNT
Beitar Shimshon Tel Aviv		3–0		6–1		1–0	1–3	0–2 (Note: Hapoel Umm al-Fahm received a technical loss of 2-0 to Beitar/Shimshon Tel Aviv because only six of their players showed up for the game.)				1–4
Hapoel Bnei Tamra			0–1		1–1	2–4				4–1	7–0	
Hapoel Ashkelon	0–1			2–1			3–1		0–0	1–2	5–1	
Hapoel Bnei Jadeidi		1–0						1–0	1–2	0–2	2–3	
Hapoel Nazareth Illit	0–0		0–1	0–1					0–1	2–1	2–0	
Hapoel Marmorek			1–1	3–0	2–0				2–0	3–0	3–1	
Hapoel Rishon LeZion		3–0		0–3	3–0	0–2		5–0 (Note: Hapoel Umm al-Fahm showed up for the game with eight players, the game was played until the referee stopped the game in the 30th minute after Hapoel Rishon LeZion was leading 5–0.)				0–4
Hapoel Umm al-Fahm		1–0	1–3		0–6	0–8					6–0	
Ironi Bat Yam	1–1	3–0					1–3	1–0				1–1
Maccabi Kafr Kanna	4–1						2–0	1–0	1–3			0–1
Maccabi Ironi Tirat HaCarmel	5–3						1–5		0–3	0–4		0–3
Sektzia Nes Tziona		3–2	0–0	1–1	1–0	2–2		7–0				

Source: The Israel Football Association
Legend: Blue = home team win; Yellow = draw; Red = away team win.

== Promotion playoff ==
Maccabi Kafr Kanna as the 8th-placed team faced the 11th-placed Liga Leumit team Ironi Ramat HaSharon for a two-legged playoff, Maccabi Kafr Kanna lost both games and were relegated to Liga Alef.

2 June 2009
16:30 UTC+2

Ironi Ramat HaSharon	2 – 1	Maccabi Kafr Kanna
Banahene 73', 85'; Shabo (penalty missed)	Report	Zilka 45'

Grundman Stadium, Ramat HaSharon
Referee: Meir Levi

5 June 2009
15:30 UTC+2

Maccabi Kafr Kanna	0 – 1	Ironi Ramat HaSharon
	Report	Banahene 19'

Azmi Nassar Stadium, Kafr Kanna
Referee: Assaf Keinan

== Season statistics ==
=== Scoring ===
- First goal of the season: Wajdi Abu Yones for Bnei Tamra against Maccabi Tirat HaCarmel, 2nd minute (5 September 2008)
- Widest winning margin: 8 goals: Hapoel Umm al-Fahm 0–8 Hapoel Marmorek (29 May 2009)
- Most goals in a match: 8 goals: Hapoel Umm al-Fahm 0–8 Hapoel Marmorek (29 May 2009)

=== Discipline ===
- First yellow card of the season: Roshdi Soph for Bnei Tamra against Maccabi Tirat HaCarmel, 13th minute (5 September 2008)
- First red card of the season: Moshe Ben Haim for Ironi Bat Yam against Hapoel Rishon LeZion, 73rd minute (29 August 2008)

== Top scorers ==
Rank	Player	Club	Goals
1	(Israel) Yosef Asayag	Sektzia Nes Tziona	15
2	(Israel) Shay Abuksis	Sektzia Nes Tziona	14
3	(Israel) Ofir Halwani	Hapoel Umm al-Fahm / Beitar Shimshon Tel Aviv	11
3	(Israel) Nissim Ben David	Hapoel Ashkelon	11
3	(Israel) Bryan Man	Hapoel Ashkelon	11
6	(Israel) Mati Avraham	Ironi Bat Yam	10
6	(Israel) Wajdi Abu Yones	Bnei Tamra	10
6	(Israel) Ofer Shitrit	Hapoel Rishon LeZion	10
6	(Israel) Shlomi Tolado	Beitar Shimshon Tel Aviv	10
10	(Israel) Enon Barda	Hapoel Ashkelon	9
10	(Israel) Mordechai Kol Tuv	Hapoel Nazareth Illit	9
Total			505
Average per game			2.55

== See also ==
- List of Israeli football transfers 2008–09
- 2008–09 Toto Cup Artzit
