= Salem Abu Siam =

Israeli footballer (born 1983)

Salem Abu Siam سالم أبو صيام סאלם אבו-סיאם
Personal information
- Full name: Salem Abu Siam
- Date of birth: 8 March 1983 (age 43)
- Place of birth: Lod, Israel
- Position: Left back

Team information
- Current team: Shimshon Kafr Qasim

Youth career
- 2002: Maccabi Tel Aviv

Senior career*
Years	Team	Apps	(Gls)
2001–2006	Maccabi Tel Aviv	94	(1)
2006–2008	Bnei Yehuda	44	(0)
2008	Hapoel Acre	7	(0)
2009–2010	Hapoel Petah Tikva	12	(0)
2010–2017	Hapoel Bnei Lod	158	(14)
2017–2018	Shimshon Kafr Qasim	28	(5)
2018	Shimshon Bnei Tayibe	1	(0)

International career
2001	Israel U19	6	(0)
2002–2005	Israel U21	14	(0)
- * Club domestic league appearances and goals

Salem Abu Siam (Arabic: سالم أبو سيام, Hebrew: סאלם אבו-סיאם; born 8 March 1983) is a former Israeli professional footballer.

== Career ==
=== Youth career ===
Salem was part of the youth side at Maccabi Tel Aviv that won two straight championship titles as well as a cup title. It was inevitable that he would be promoted to the first side where he eventually received a starting role.

=== Maccabi Tel Aviv ===
While in his first season at Maccabi Tel Aviv, they won a league championship and in his third season, Abu Siam was playing in the UEFA Champions League. Abu Siam, although as a Beduin belongs to a group not totally identified with the Arab community and therefore is not exactly of the same ethnic background as other Arab Israeli footballers such as Salim Tuama, Salah Hasarma or Abbas Suan, often had to turn the other cheek to racist remarks shouted at those players (or occasionally at him) by Maccabi fans, who are known for their often flagrantly personally offensive chants, and are often ranked highest on the Israeli press's tally for most racist fan community.

=== Bnei Yehuda Tel Aviv ===
At the beginning of the 2006–07 season Abu Siam made the eyebrow-raising decision to sign with one of Mac TA's crosstown rivals, Bnei Yehuda Tel Aviv, a club with a fanatical fanbase smaller than Maccabi's, but more violent. Although at the beginning of the season the fans ridiculed the decision to sign the club's first Arab player, the furor soon died down, which came to a surprise following similar affairs with Beitar Jerusalem that had occurred in 2005 and 2006 in regards to efforts to sign Muslim Nigerian player Ndala Ibrahim.

=== Hapoel Petah Tikva ===
Abu Siam signed a one-year contract with Hapoel Petah Tikva in October 2009.

== Statistics ==
Club performance			League		Cup		League Cup		Continental		Total	
Season	Club	League	Apps	Goals	Apps	Goals	Apps	Goals	Apps	Goals	Apps	Goals
Israel			League		Israel State Cup		Toto Cup		Europe		Total	
2006–2007	Bnei Yehuda	Ligat ha'Al	26	0	1	0	5	1	0	0	32	1
2007–2008	Bnei Yehuda	Ligat ha'Al	18	0	1	1	5	0	0	0	24	1
2008–2009	Hapoel Acre	Liga Leumit	6	0	1	0	0	0	0	0	7	0
2009–2010	Hapoel Petah Tikva	Ligat ha'Al	13	0	1	1	0	0	0	0	14	1
2010–2011	Hapoel Bnei Lod	Liga Leumit	4	0	0	0	0	0	0	0	4	0
2011–2012	Hapoel Bnei Lod	Liga Leumit	19	2	2	1	4	0	0	0	25	3
Career total			-	-	-	-	-	-	-	-	-	-
