= My Two Worlds =

Novel by Sergio Chejfec

My Two Worlds is a novel by the Argentine writer Sergio Chejfec. The book follows a first-person narrator as he takes a walk through an unnamed Brazilian city. It depicts the narrator's wandering both physically and mentally through an unfamiliar environment that reminds him of other walks he has taken in other cities. Chejfec says he set the novel in Brazil because it is an immense country that is culturally and linguistically different from the rest of Latin America, which gives the character space to get lost in and reflect on the separation within himself. The character leads a divided existence where the material world and the world of thought are in constant tension.

Critics have praised My Two Worlds for its "perverse, profound magic" and its "penetrating" insights into the mind, but showed less enthusiasm for its "affectations" and tendency to exhaust the reader.

The original Spanish-language edition of the book was published in 2008 by Alfaguara Argentina under the title Mis dos mundos. In 2011, an English translation by Margaret Carson was published by Open Letter Books.
