= 2003–04 Liga Artzit =

The 2003–04 Liga Artzit season saw Ironi Nir Ramat HaSharon win the title and promotion to Liga Leumit alongside runners-up Hapoel Acre. Hapoel Tira and Hapoel Beit She'an were relegated to Liga Alef.

Beitar Avraham Be'er Sheva who had been relegated from Liga Leumit the previous season and were due to play in Liga Artzit in 2003–04, folded in the summer of 2003. Their place was taken by Hapoel Marmorek, the best runners-up in Liga Alef.

== Final table ==
Pos	Team	Pld	W	D	L	GF	GA	GD	Pts	Promotion or relegation
1	Ironi Nir Ramat HaSharon	33	21	9	3	58	19	+39	72	Promoted to Liga Leumit
2	Hapoel Acre	33	18	10	5	59	25	+34	64	Promoted to Liga Leumit
3	Hapoel Ashkelon	33	15	8	10	65	42	+23	53	
4	Maccabi Ironi Kiryat Ata	33	13	13	7	52	34	+18	52	
5	Maccabi Kafr Kanna	33	11	13	9	51	49	+2	46	
6	Hapoel Herzliya	33	12	6	15	45	47	−2	42	
7	Maccabi Ramat Amidar	33	12	5	16	34	50	−16	41	
8	Hapoel Marmorek	33	9	12	12	45	43	+2	39	
9	Hapoel Majd al-Krum	33	10	8	15	34	49	−15	38	
10	Beitar Shimshon Tel Aviv	33	9	9	15	37	49	−12	36	
11	Hapoel Tira	33	9	6	18	33	63	−30	33	Relegated to Liga Alef
12	Hapoel Beit She'an	33	6	7	20	23	66	−43	25	Relegated to Liga Alef

Source: rsssf.com
