= Meir Itzhaki =

Israeli footballer

Personal information
- Full name: Meir Itzhaki
- Place of birth: Israel

Senior career*
Years	Team	Apps	(Gls)
- Hapoel Ramat HaSharon
- * Club domestic league appearances and goals

Meir Itzhaki (Hebrew: מאיר יצחקי) is a former Israeli footballer who from 1997 owned Ironi Nir Ramat HaSharon.
