= Sergio Chejfec =

Argentine Jewish writer (1956–2022)

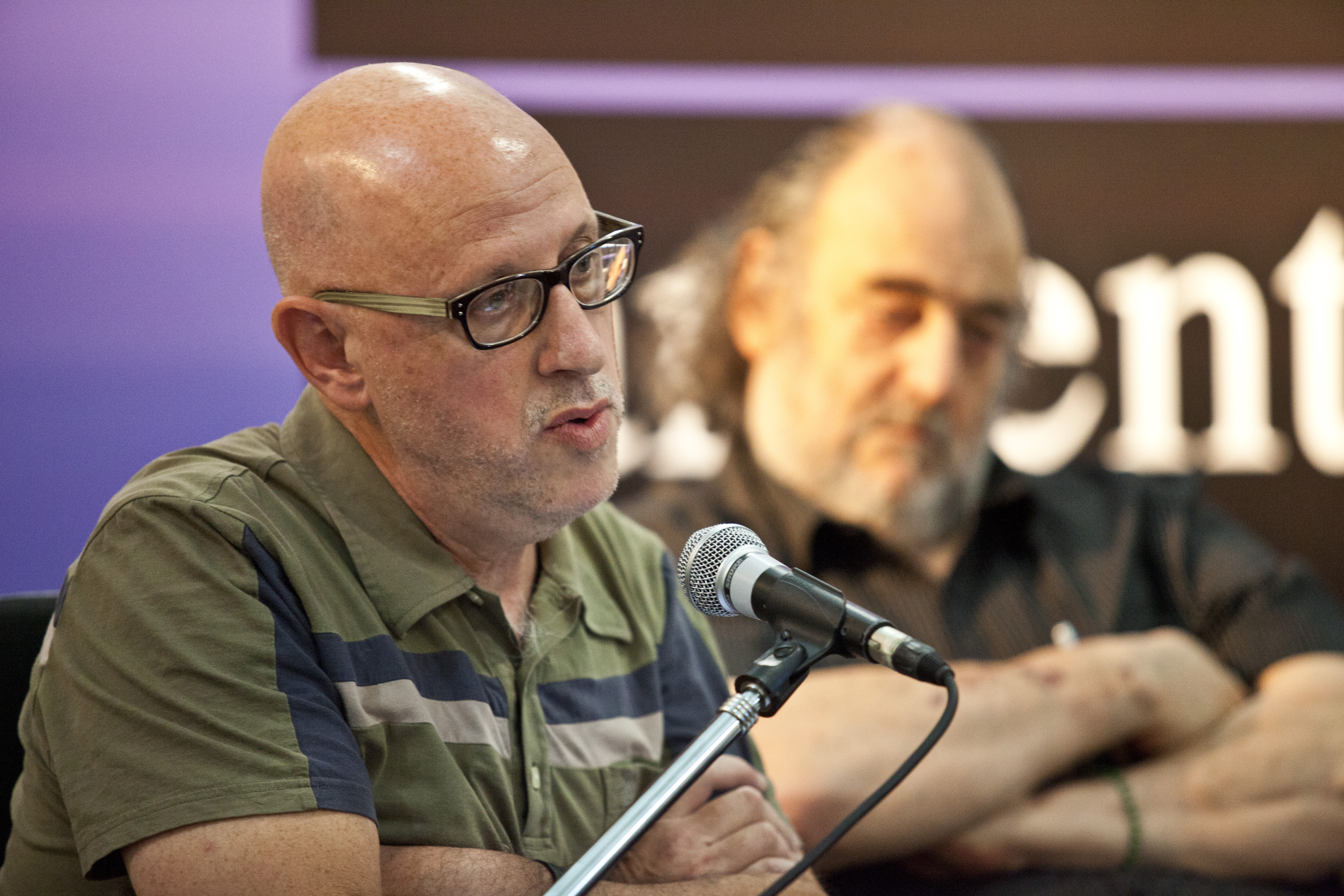
- Born: 28 November 1956; Buenos Aires, Argentina
- Died: 2 April 2022 (aged 65); New York, New York, United States
- Occupation: Writer

Sergio Chejfec (28 November 1956 – 2 April 2022) was an Argentine Jewish writer. He was born in Buenos Aires in 1956. Chejfec published eighteen books, including novels, essays, short stories, and a poetry collection. From 1990 to 2005 he lived in Venezuela, where he published Nueva sociedad, a journal of politics, culture and the social sciences. He most recently lived in New York City and held the position of Distinguished Writer in Residence in the M.F.A. Creative Writing program in Spanish at New York University.

His works include Lenta biografía (1990), Los planetas (1999), Boca de lobo (2000), Los incompletos (2004), Baroni: un viaje (2007), Mis dos mundos (2008), and La experiencia dramática (2012). He has been compared to Juan José Saer, which he found flattering but not accurate. His novels usually feature a slow-paced narration that interweaves a minimal plot with reflection. Memory, political violence, and Jewish-Argentine culture and history are some of the recurring themes in his work.

Chejfec's installation at the Kochi-Muziris Biennale 2017, "Dissemination of a Novel," was based on his novel, Baroni, a Journey.

Chejfec died in New York City on 2 April 2022, at the age of 65.

== Awards and honors ==
- 2000 Fellow, John Simon Guggenheim Foundation
- 2007 Fellow, Civitella Ranieri Foundation
- 2013 International Dublin Literary Award, longlist, My Two Worlds
- 2013 Best Translated Book Award, shortlist, The Planets
- 2014 Second National Literature Award (Argentina) for Modo linterna
- 2014 National Translation Award, longlist, The Dark

== Bibliography ==
- Lenta biografía. Buenos Aires: Puntosur, 1990.
- Moral. Buenos Aires: Puntosur, 1990.
- El aire. Buenos Aires: Alfaguara, 1992.
- Cinco. Saint-Nazaire (France): M.E.E.T., 1996.
- El llamado de la especie. Rosario (Argentina): Beatriz Viterbo, 1997.
- Los planetas. Buenos Aires: Alfaguara, 1999.
- Boca de lobo. Buenos Aires: Alfaguara, 2000.
- Tres poemas y una merced, in Diario de Poesía 62 (2002), Buenos Aires.
- Gallos y huesos. Buenos Aires: Santiago Arcos, 2003.
- Los incompletos. Buenos Aires: Alfaguara, 2004.
- El punto vacilante. Buenos Aires: Norma, 2005.
- Baroni: un viaje. Buenos Aires: Alfaguara, 2007.
- Mis dos mundos. Barcelona: Candaya, 2008.
- Sobre Giannuzzi. Buenos Aires: bajo la luna, 2010.
- La experiencia dramática. Buenos Aires: Alfaguara, 2012.
- Hacia la ciudad eléctrica. La Plata, Argentina: El Broche, 2012.
- Modo linterna. Buenos Aires: Editorial Entropía, 2013.
- Últimas noticias de la escritura Buenos Aires: Editorial Entropía, 2015.
- Teoría del ascensor España: Jekyll and Jill, 2016.
- El visitante. Buenos Aires: Editorial Excursiones, 2017.
- 5, Jekyll and Jill, 2019.

== English translations ==
- My Two Worlds (Open Letter, 2011), translated by Margaret Carson.
- The Planets (Open Letter, 2012), translated by Heather Cleary.
- The Dark (Open Letter, 2013), translated by Heather Cleary.
- A Studio in the Gallery: The Playful Universe of Ignacio Iturria (Neuberger Museum of Art, Purchase College, SUNY, 2017), translated by Julia Sanches.
- Baroni, a Journey (Almost Island, 2017), translated by Margaret Carson.
- The Incompletes(Open Letter, 2019), translated by Heather Cleary
- Notes Toward a Pamphlet (Ugly Duckling Presse, 2020), translated by Whitney DeVos.
