= Raphi Cohen =

Israeli chef (born 1975)

Rafi Cohen
- רפי כהן
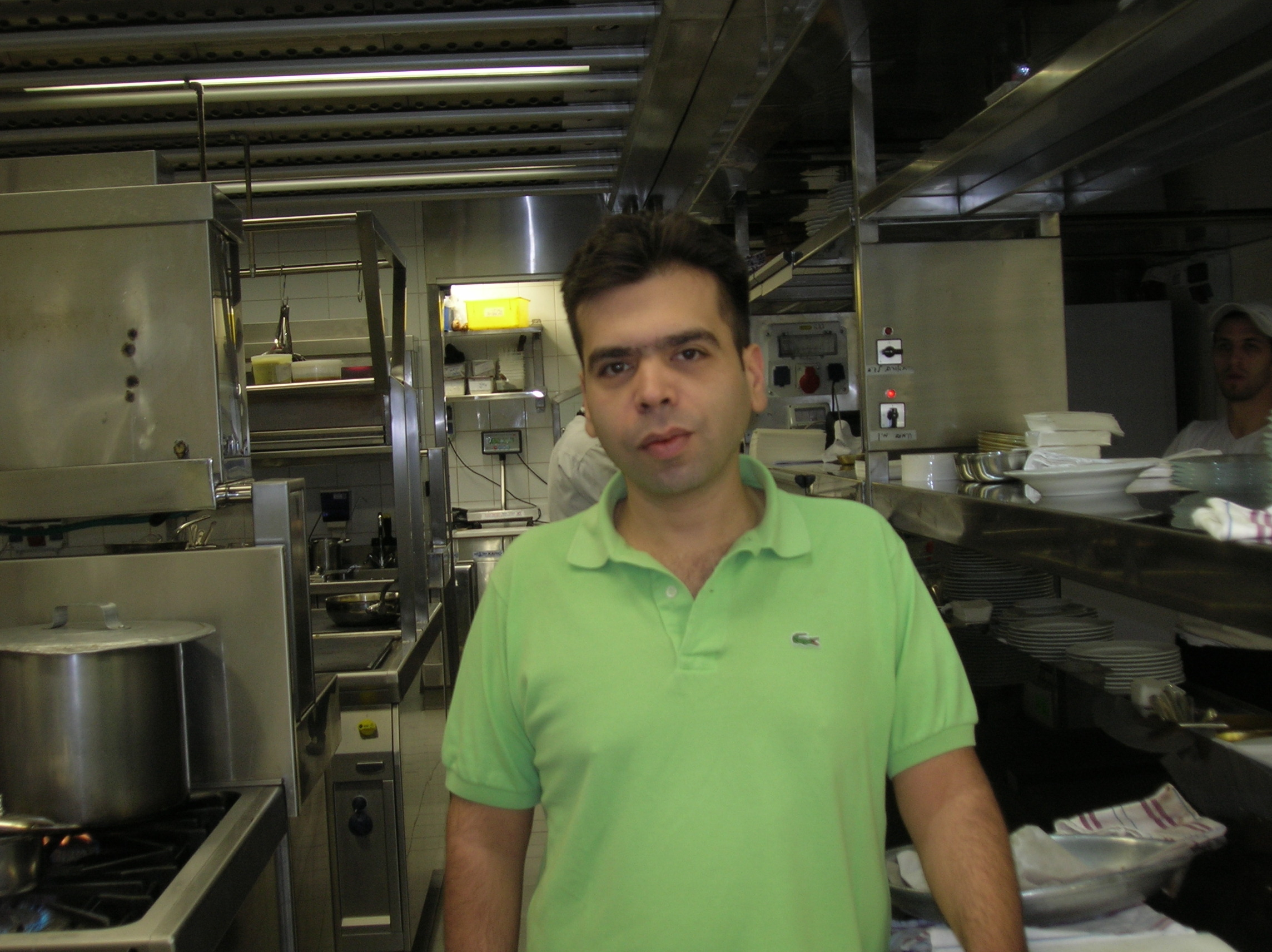
- Raphi Cohen, 2011
- Born: 1975 (age 50–51); Tel Aviv
- Occupation: Chef

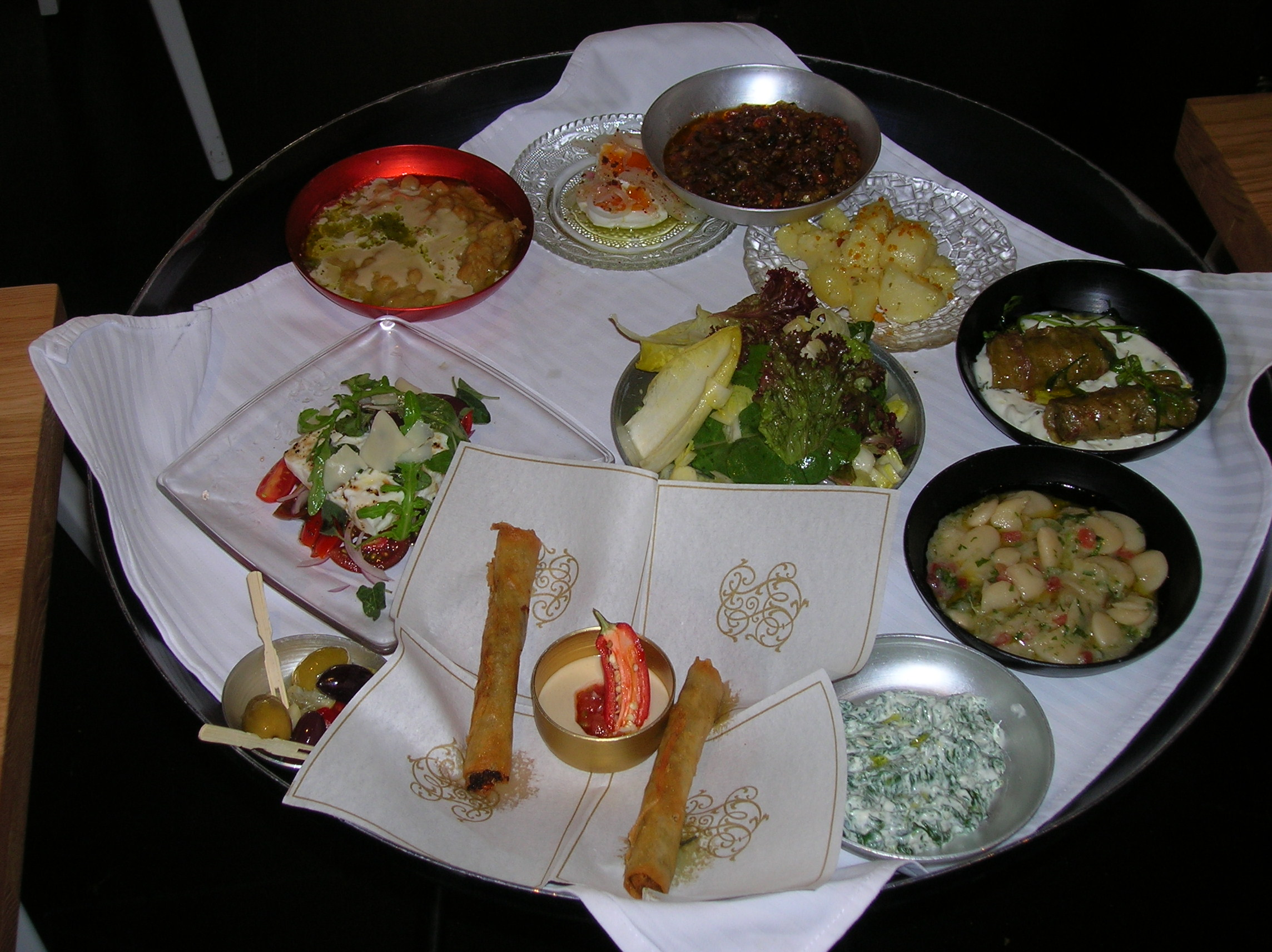
Appetizers in Rafael restaurant

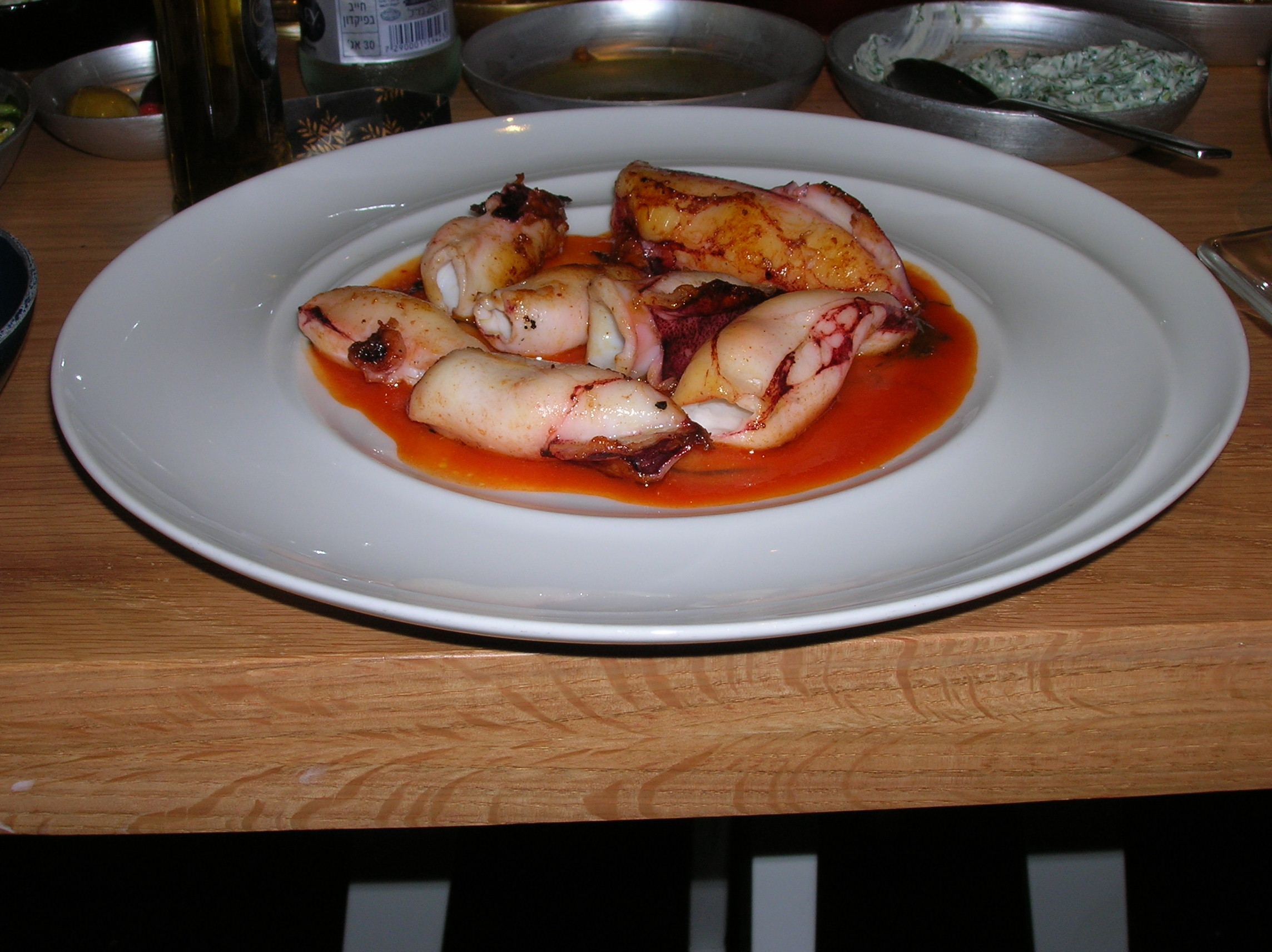
Calamari a la plancha in Rafael restaurant

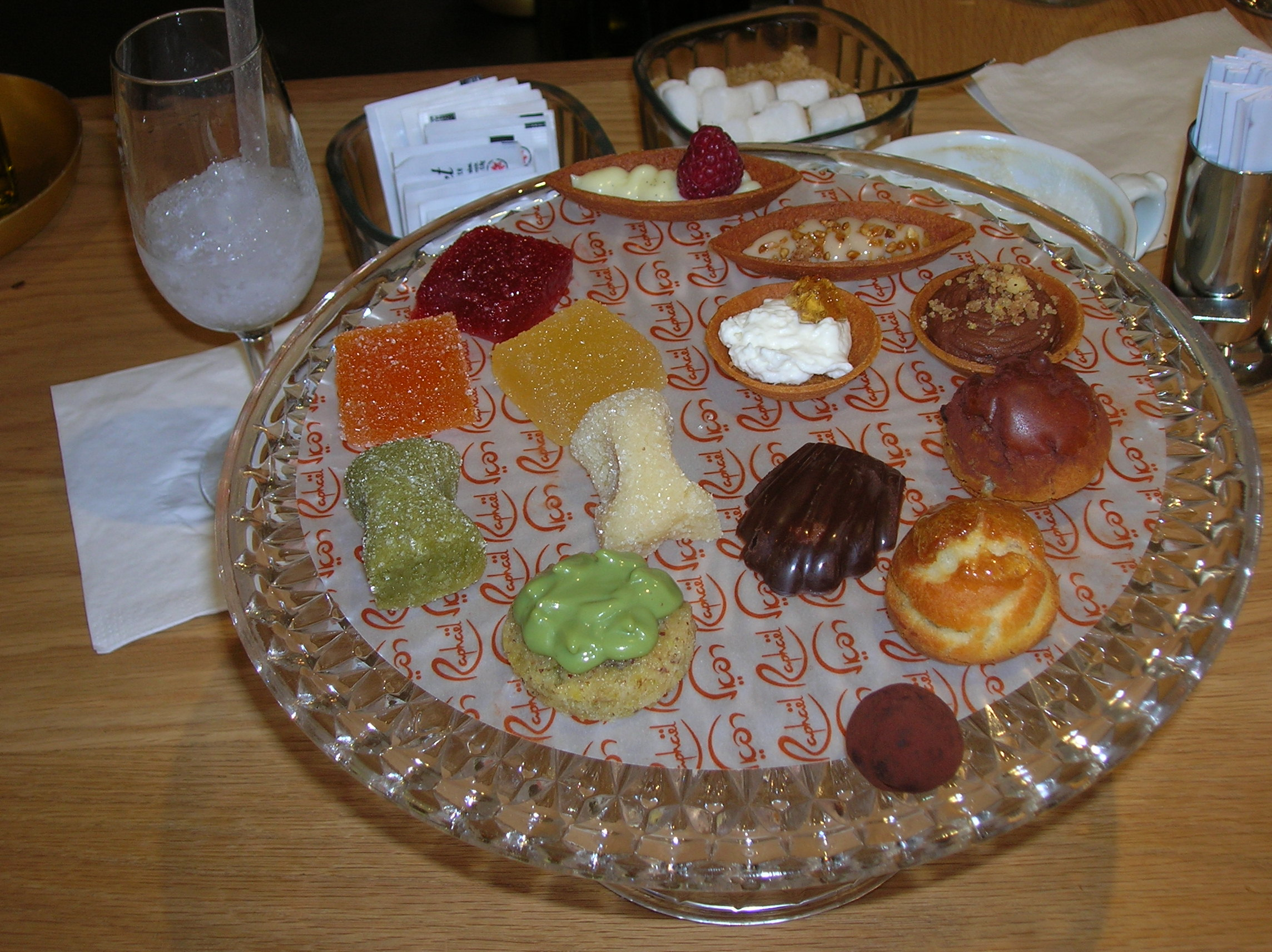
Assortment of handmade Petits Fours in Rafael restaurant

Raphi Cohen (Hebrew: רפי כהן; born 1975 in Jerusalem) is an Israeli chef. He is the former owner of the "Raphael" bistro restaurant.

== Biography ==
Raphi Cohen was raised in the German Colony, Jerusalem, and started his apprenticeship at age 13 in King David Hotel pastry. As a teenager he worked in Grappa restaurant. When Arcadia restaurant in Jerusalem opened in 1995, he started working there during his military service.

After Cohen finished his military service he went abroad for three years. He worked with Alain Passard and Pierre Gagnaire in Paris, France, Marco Pierre White in London, Britain, and at the hotel restaurant Don Alfonso in Sant'Agata sui due Golfi near Naples, Italy. All four chefs held three star ratings in Michelin Guide at the time.

When Cohen came back to Israel, he was appointed as chef in large of La Regence at the King David Hotel in Jerusalem. In 2001, at age 25, he opened Raphael restaurant in King David Hotel, Tel Aviv. In the restaurant menu, Cohen combined Haute cuisine with Moroccan cuisine that he learned from his grandmother, serving dishes like Moroccan Cigars and Couscous. Frommer's Guide wrote that "Chef Raphi Cohen is among Israel's best, and his ever-changing menu reflects a feel for French/Mediterranean cuisine heavily touched with the flavors of Israel."

Your way site wrote, "Chef Raphi Cohen that is considered to be one the top chefs and one of the most surprising chefs in Israeli cuisine...The Rafael restaurant is definitely one of the good restaurants of Tel Aviv."

Telavivme writes "considered as one of the top-chef's restaurants in Tel Aviv."

It was chosen as one of the ten best restaurants in Israel by Sagi Cohen, Maariv's Food critic. It was also chosen as one of the best restaurants in Israel by Daniel Rogov, Haaretz food and wine critic, and as one of the ten best restaurants in Israel by Al Hashulchan magazine.

Since 2015 Cohen had been involved in legal battles with former employees from one of his restaurants, which he accused of embezzlement. At the climax of the ordeal Cohen broke down and was hospitalized.

In April 2017 his famous restaurant "Raphael" was shut down after many workers have not been paid in months, and Cohen could not be reached.

On September 7, 2017, Cohen was arrested at the Ben-Gurion international airport upon his return to Israel, for failing to appear in court hearings regarding charges of assault that he was facing.

On November 6, 2017 he was arrested again for suspicion of delivering death threats to a former business partner.

In April 2018 Cohen officially filed for bankruptcy. In 2022, his bankruptcy proceedings were closed by court order, releasing his debt obligations.
