= Haim Shabo =

Israeli footballer and manager

Haim Shabo חיים שאבו
Personal information
- Full name: Haim Shabo
- Date of birth: April 1, 1973 (age 53)
- Place of birth: Ramat HaSharon, Israel
- Position: Forward

Youth career
- Hapoel Ramat HaSharon

Senior career*
Years	Team	Apps	(Gls)
1989–2009	Hapoel Ramat HaSharon		
1990–1999	Maccabi Petah Tikva		
1991–1992	→ Shimshon Tel Aviv		
1999	Maccabi Herzliya		
1999–2007	Hapoel Herzliya		
2007–2008	Beitar Shimshon Tel Aviv		
2009–2010	Maccabi HaShikma Ramat Hen		
2010–2011	Hapoel Hod HaSharon		

Managerial career
- 2011–2013: Hapoel Ramat HaSharon (youth)
- 2013–2015: Hapoel Ramat HaSharon
- 2015–2016: Maccabi Herzliya
- 2016: Hapoel Kfar Shalem
- 2016–2018: Hapoel Ramat HaSharon
- 2018: Hapoel Kfar Saba
- 2019–2020: Beitar Jerusalem (assistant manager)
- 2020–2021: Hapoel Petah Tikva
- 2021: Hapoel Rishon LeZion
- * Club domestic league appearances and goals

Haim Shabo (Hebrew: חיים שאבו) is a former Israeli footballer and current manager.

He is of a Tunisian-Jewish descent.

== Honours ==
- Liga Artzit
  - 2003–04
- Toto Cup Artzit
  - 2003–04
