= Luciana Val and Franco Musso =

Argentine photographer duo

Luciana Val (born 31 January 1971, Buenos Aires, Argentina) and Franco Musso (born 10 December 1974, San Miguel de Tucumán, Tucumán) are an Argentine photographer duo. They work together on commercial and personal projects. Their work has been published in books and international fashion magazines.

Paris by Luciana Val & Franco Musso

== Biography ==
Luciana Val and Franco Musso first met while studying at the Manuel Belgrano Fine Arts School in Buenos Aires. They took part in several art exhibitions after graduating and became involved in photography both as a work of art and a line of work. They were soon introduced to the fashion world and began shooting both editorial and advertising in Buenos Aires, where they quickly became known for their unique style. Luciana worked as a photography editor at Superlab magazine, an independent publication that appeared during the 90s, while Franco Musso started a modeling career that sent him abroad to work in campaigns and fashion shows.

== Paris ==
Val and Musso moved to Paris in 2002, following the economic crisis in their country. In 2004 they won the 19th Festival international de mode et de photographie à Hyères with a series of surrealist miniature still life. Since then, their work has been widely published in magazines such as: 10 Magazine, Harper’s Bazaar, Vogue Italia, Japanese Vogue, Numéro, Numéro Tokyo, Russian Vogue, The Sunday Times, The New York Times, Vanity Fair UK, Vogue Turkey and V Magazine. Their style has been sought after for the advertising campaigns of luxury and fashion clients like Cartier, Chanel, Dior Joaillerie, Dom Perignon, Givenchy, Gucci, Kate Spade, Lanvin, L’Oréal Le Printemps, Louis Vuitton, Piper by Victor & Rolf, Repetto, Roger Vivier and Yves Saint Laurent, among others.

In 2009 they were commissioned to create the photography for the sixth studio album by French electronic music duo Air. In 2012 Val and Musso shot the 111th Anniversary Collection for Bergdorf Goodman.

== Alice in Wonderland ==
They collaborate frequently with Argentine fashion designers Vero Ivaldi and Pablo Ramírez, with whom they worked for the Alice in Wonderland project that accompanied the release of the film by Tim Burton of the same name. The resulting photographs were displayed during Buenos Aires Fashion Week and later auctioned for the Make a Wish foundation.

== Buenos Aires' first fashion retrospective ==
Over the months of July and August 2013, the city of Buenos Aires held its first great fashion design retrospective at the Centro Cultural Recoleta by the name "De Gino Bogani al diseño de autor". Val and Musso were approached to create the images that would illustrate the exhibition, along with over 100 dresses and accessories. The show focused on the career of Gino Bogani, whose elaborate and over-the-top creations have dressed Argentine celebrities for the last decades and also included pieces from a wide array of designers, ranging from established and commercial to emerging and experimental ones. The exhibit was seen by over fifty thousand visitors, and a book containing the photographs created by Luciana and Franco was published.

== Recent work ==
The year 2014 found them showing their work at the Museum of Modern Art in Buenos Aires, in Eduardo Costa’s restaging of Fashion Fiction, and opening an individual exhibition called Lullaby at the Galerie Madé in Paris. In April 2015 they participated in a retrospective celebrating the 30th anniversary of Hyères’ International Festival of Fashion and Photography. Later that year, they prepared a huge exhibition showcasing their collaborations with fashion designer Pablo Ramírez. Under the name Magia Negra (Black Magic), this exhibit featured photographs, garments and video. It first opened at the Osde Foundation in the Argentine city of Rosario and afterwards it travelled to the foundation’s main building in Buenos Aires, gathering great levels of attendance and media coverage in both cities.

== Books ==
Their work has been published in the following books:

- Dior: New Looks, Jerome Gautier (Author), Harper Collins (Publisher), 2015, (ISBN 978-0062410887)
- Hair: Fashion and Fantasy, Laurent Philippon (Author), Natasha Fraser-Cavassoni (Contributor), Daphne Guinness (Contributor), Thames & Hudson (Publisher), 2013, (ISBN 978-0500291085)
- Louis Vuitton: City Bags, Marc Jacobs (Contributor), Florence Muller (Contributor), Takashi Murakami (Contributor), Rizzoli International Publications (Publisher), October 2013, (ISBN 978-0847840878)
- Louis Vuitton / Marc Jacobs: In Association with the Musee des Arts Decoratifs, Pamela Golbin (Editor), Yves Carcelle (Preface), Helene David Weill (Preface), Beatrice Salmon (Preface), Veronique Belloir (Contributor), Rizzoli International Publications (Publisher). April 2012, (ISBN 978-0847840878)
- Dior Joaillerie, Michele Heuze (Author), Victoire de Castellane (Preface), Rizzoli International Publications (Publisher), March 2012, (ISBN 978-0847837182)
- High Heels: Fashion, Femininity & Seduction, Valerie Steele (Author), Tim Blanks (Author), Philip Delamore (Author), James Crump (Author), Ivan Vartanian (Editor), Goliga (Publisher), January 2012, (ISBN 978-1935202691)
- Mon carnet d'addresses, Chantal Thomass (Author), Dominique Foufelle (Contributor), Valérie Vangreveninge (Contributor), Victoire Meneur (Contributor), Editions du Chêne (Publisher), 2011, (ISBN 978-2812304781)
- Atlas of Fashion Designers, Laura Eceiza (Author), Rockport Publishers (Publisher), September 2010, (ISBN 978-1592536610)
- Delvaux: 180 Years of Belgian Luxury, Hettie Judah (Author), Vronique Pouillard (Author), Lannoo Publishers (Publisher), April 2010, (ISBN 978-9020985993)
- Babeth, Babeth Djian (Photographer), Steidl (Publisher), November 2008, (Publisher), (ISBN 978-3865214829)
