= Alexis Weisheim =

Argentine footballer

Personal information
- Full name: Héctor Alexis Weisheim
- Date of birth: 15 January 1981 (age 45)
- Place of birth: Piedras Blancas, Argentina
- Position: Striker

Team information
- Current team: Club Sanjustino de San Justo

Youth career
- Unión de Santa Fe

Senior career*
Years	Team	Apps	(Gls)
2000–2004	Unión de Santa Fe	6	(0)
2004–2006	Hapoel Kfar Saba	18	(5)
2006–2007	Hapoel Haifa	0	(0)
2007	Maccabi Ironi Tirat haCarmel	18	(2)
2007	Hapoel Acre	2	(0)
2007–2008	Hapoel Asi Gilboa	20	(10)
2008–2009	Maccabi Kafr Kanna	13	(3)
2009	Ironi Umm al-Fahm	13	(5)
2009–2011	F.C. Karmiel Safed	0	(0)
2011–2012	M.S. Givat Olga	?	(?)
2013–2015	Atlético Paraná	?	(?)
2015–	Club Sanjustino de San Justo	?	(?)
- * Club domestic league appearances and goals as of 07:36, 21 October 2014 (UTC)

Alexis Weisheim (born 15 January 1981 in Entre Ríos Province) is an Argentine footballer who is playing for Club Sanjustino de San Justo.

== Biography ==
=== Personal life ===
Weisheim has diabetes.

In 2006, he signed for Israeli side Hapoel Kfar Saba.

His last spell in Israel was with M.S. Givat Olga, where he was released in June 2012. He later returned to Argentina, and continues to play there in lower-level leagues, currently with Club Sanjustino de San Justo.

== Statistics ==
Club performance			League		Cup		League Cup		Continental		Total	
Season	Club	League	Apps	Goals	Apps	Goals	Apps	Goals	Apps	Goals	Apps	Goals
Israel			League		Israel State Cup		Toto Cup		Europe		Total	
2005–2006	Hapoel Kfar Saba	Ligat ha'Al	3	0	0	0	4	2	0	0	7	2
2006–2007	Hapoel Haifa	Liga Leumit	0	0	0	0	6	1	0	0	6	1
2007	Maccabi Ironi Tirat haCarmel	Liga Artzit	18	2	0	0	0	0	0	0	18	2
2007	Hapoel Acre	Liga Leumit	2	0	0	0	1	0	0	0	3	0
2007–2008	Hapoel Asi Gilboa	Liga Alef	20	10	5	4	1	0	0	0	26	14
2008–2009	Maccabi Kafr Kanna	Liga Artzit	13	3	1	1	4	0	0	0	18	4
2009	Ironi Umm al-Fahm	Liga Alef	13	5	0	0	0	0	0	0	13	5
2009–2010	F.C. Karmiel Safed	Liga Alef	0	0	0	0	0	0	0	0	0	0
2010–2011	F.C. Karmiel Safed	Liga Alef	0	0	0	0	0	0	0	0	0	0
2011–2012	M.S. Givat Olga	Liga Alef	0	0	0	0	0	0	0	0	0	0
Total	Israel		-	-	-	-	-	-	-	-	-	-
Career total			-	-	-	-	-	-	-	-	-	-
