= Bruno Reis =

Portuguese footballer

Personal information
- Full name: Bruno Miguel Carapeto Reis
- Date of birth: 20 July 1999 (age 27)
- Place of birth: Portimão, Portugal
- Height: 1.76 m (5 ft 9 in)
- Position: Midfielder

Team information
- Current team: Differdange 03
- Number: 8

Youth career
- 2011–2019: Portimonense

Senior career*
| Years | Team | Apps | (Gls) |
| 2019–2025 | Portimonense | 9 | (0) |
| 2023–2024 | → Covilhã (loan) | 17 | (3) |
| 2025– | Differdange 03 | 1 | (0) |
- * Club domestic league appearances and goals as of 3 August 2025

Bruno Miguel Carapeto Reis (born 20 July 1999) is a Portuguese professional footballer who plays as a midfielder for Luxembourgish club Differdange 03.

== Career ==
Reis signed his first professional contract with his childhood club Portimonense on 2 November 2017. He made his professional debut for Portimonense in a 2–0 Primeira Liga loss to Vitória de Guimarães on 16 February 2019.

In July 2023, Portimonense sent Reis on a season-long loan to Liga 3 side Sporting da Covilhã.

On 24 June 2025, Reis joined Differdange 03 in Luxembourg.
