= Naomi Preizler =

Argentine model, artist (born 1990)

- Born: 12 October 1990 (age 35); Buenos Aires, Argentina
- Occupations: Model, artist
- Years active: 2006–present
- Modeling information
- Height: 1.78 m (5 ft 10 in)
- Hair color: Blonde
- Eye color: Green
- Agency: Pink Models Management (Buenos Aires; mother agency); Elite Model Management (New York); Iconic Management (Hamburg); Oui Management (Paris); Premier Model Management (London); Traffic Models (Barcelona)
- Website: Official website

Naomi Preizler (born 12 October 1990) is an Argentine fashion model and artist, known for her "longilinear silhouette, long blonde hair and androgynous face."

== Career ==
Although discovered at age 14 by a model scout, Preizler did not begin her international modelling career until she finished high school. She started her national modelling career, however, at age 15. Dubbed the "girl of the moment" by Clarín in 2013, she has walked for Chanel, Givenchy, Balenciaga, Alexander Wang, Vivienne Westwood, Jean Paul Gaultier and Jeremy Scott, among others. She has also been photographed for Harper's Bazaar Argentina, Vogue Russia, Vogue Italia, Interview, Love and Grit. Preizler was the face of BAFWEEK fall/winter 2012. She also sang in BAFWEEK 2013, closing the Desiderata fashion show.

Preizler has also gained recognition as an artist. She studied at the New York Academy of Art and Art Students League of New York. She usually draws while queuing for fashion castings and fittings, inspired by the clothes and the models. Inspired by Expressionists like Gustav Klimt and Oskar Kokoschka, Preizler usually draws women, "reflective faces" and self-portraits. Some of her sketches are developed into paintings using gaudy colors and exaggerated features. Jean Paul Gaultier owns a watercolor she made of him and Beth Ditto at the finale of his spring/summer 2011 show. The Argentine brand AY Not Dead launched a collection of shirts with drawings by Preizler, which are tributes to Niki de Saint Phalle who focused on the curves of the female body. She has also collaborated with Vogue Italia and Harvey Nichols on an illustration project for its spring/summer 2012 collection.

Preizler releases music under the moniker MUÑEKI77A. In January 2026, she released a collaborative song with the band Ladrones, titled "Extra XD".

== Personal life ==
Preizler was raised in an artistic family, her father being an architect and sometimes oil painter, and her grandmother a sculptor. Preizler resides in Brooklyn, New York and Buenos Aires.

Preizler is of German descent. She is also Jewish. Her grandparents were Jewish immigrants who went to Argentina fleeing from Nazism. In the romantic novel festival Romántica Buenos Aires, she paid homage to them through a performance in which she read their love letters, shared apple cake that she cooked with her grandmother's recipe, and wore a dress that belonged to her.

== See also ==
- List of German Argentines
- List of Argentine Jews
