= 2004–05 Toto Cup Artzit =

Toto Cup Artzit
- Season: 2004–05
- Champions: Hapoel Ashkelon (3rd title)

The 2004–05 Toto Cup Artzit was the 6th time the cup was being contested as a competition for the third tier in the Israeli football league system.

The competition was won by Hapoel Ashkelon, who had beaten Hapoel Ramat Gan 4–2 on penalties after 3–3 in the final.

== Group stage ==
=== Group A ===
Pos	Team	Pld	W	D	L	GF	GA	GD	Pts	HRG	MBS	HMK	SRH	MTC	MKK
1	Hapoel Ramat Gan (A)	10	4	4	2	16	11	+5	16	—	1–1	1–0	4–2	4–0	5–0
2	Maccabi Be'er Sheva (A)	10	3	6	1	14	4	+10	15	0–0	—	4–0	1–2	0–0	5–0
3	Hapoel Marmorek	10	4	3	3	16	15	+1	15	1–1	1–1	—	0–0	3–0	2–3
4	Maccabi HaShikma Ramat Hen	10	3	4	3	14	15	−1	13	0–0	0–0	2–3	—	2–1	3–2
5	Maccabi Ironi Tirat HaCarmel	10	2	4	4	9	15	−6	10	3–0	0–0	1–3	2–2	—	1–1
6	Maccabi Kafr Kanna	10	3	1	6	14	23	−9	10	4–0	0–2	2–3	2–1	0–1	—

Source: rsssf.com (in Hebrew)
Rules for classification: 1st points; 2nd goal difference; 3rd matches won; 4th goals scored; 5th head-to-head; 6th decision match
(A) Advanced to the Semifinals

=== Group B ===
Pos	Team	Pld	W	D	L	GF	GA	GD	Pts	HAS	HHE	HMJ	IKA	MRA	BST
1	Hapoel Ashkelon (A)	10	8	1	1	24	8	+16	25	—	3–1	3–2	3–0	2–0	3–1
2	Hapoel Herzliya (A)	10	5	2	3	19	16	+3	17	1–1	—	4–2	1–2	2–1	3–2
3	Ihud Bnei Majd al-Krum	10	5	0	5	18	19	−1	15	0–4	1–2	—	3–1	2–0	2–1
4	Maccabi Kiryat Ata	10	5	0	5	16	17	−1	15	2–1	0–1	2–3	—	2–1	0–1
5	Maccabi Ramat Amidar	10	4	0	6	13	17	−4	12	0–2	1–0	2–1	1–3	—	2–0
6	Beitar Shimshon Tel Aviv	10	1	1	8	11	24	−13	4	1–2	2–2	0–2	0–3	3–5	—

Source: rsssf.com (in Hebrew)
Rules for classification: 1st points; 2nd goal difference; 3rd matches won; 4th goals scored; 5th head-to-head; 6th decision match
(A) Advanced to the Semifinals

== Knockout rounds ==
Home team	Score	Away team
Hapoel Ramat Gan	2–0	Hapoel Herzliya
Hapoel Ashkelon	2–0	Maccabi Be'er Sheva

=== Final ===
2 April 2005
16:00

Hapoel Ramat Gan	3–3 (a.e.t.)	Hapoel Ashkelon
Penalties
	2–4

Haberfeld Stadium
Referee: Moshe Perian

== See also ==
- 2004–05 Toto Cup Al
- 2004–05 Toto Cup Leumit
