= Romina Lanaro =

Argentine fashion model (born 1986)

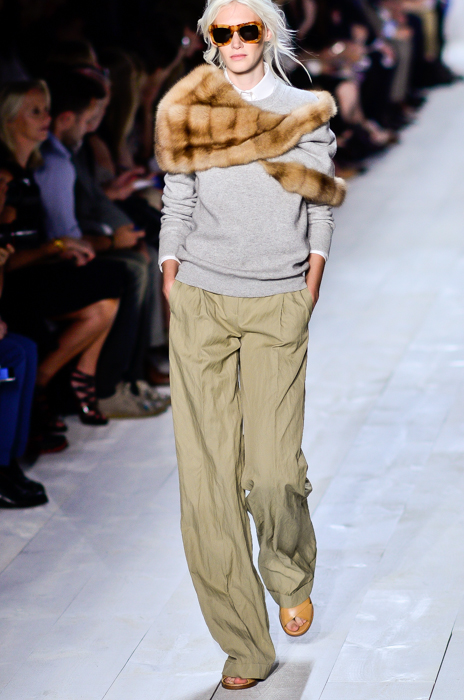
- Lanaro at Michael Kors Spring 2014 Collection
- Born: Romina Soledad Lanaro; October 19, 1986 (age 39); Rosario, Santa Fe, Argentina
- Spouse: Federico Moyano
- Modeling information
- Height: 1.82 m (6 ft 0 in)
- Hair color: Blonde
- Eye color: Blue
- Agency: DNA, Viva, Why Not

Romina Lanaro (born October 19, 1986) is an Argentine fashion model.

She was born in Rosario, Santa Fe, and began to work as model at the age of 14 when she moved to Buenos Aires. At 17 years old she moved to Paris and then to Milan where she worked for notable designers and fashion houses, such as Prada, Armani, Chloé, Emanuel Ungaro, Elie Saab, Chanel, Christian Dior, Christian Lacroix, Gucci, Jean Paul Gaultier, Paco Rabanne, Versace and Viktor and Rolf and magazines like Numéro, Marie Claire, ELLE, Harper's Bazaar UK, Allure and German and Spanish Vogue. She has appeared in many advertisement campaigns, including Alessandro Dell'Acqua, Dolce & Gabbana and Mulberry.

== Personal ==
On Saturday, 27 December 2008, Lanaro married model Federico Moyano in La Plata, Argentina. Their son, Máximo, was born on 22 September 2010.
