= Shlomi Edri =

Israeli footballer

Shlomi Edri שלומי אדרי
Personal information
- Full name: Shlomi Edri
- Date of birth: May 29, 1982 (age 44)
- Place of birth: Mazkeret Batya, Israel
- Height: 1.74 m (5 ft 8 1/2 in)
- Position: Striker

Youth career
- 1990–1997: Mazkeret Batya
- 1998–2001: Maccabi Haifa

Senior career*
Years	Team	Apps	(Gls)
2001–2002	Maccabi Herzliya		(2)
2002–2004	Hapoel Petah Tikva	57	(8)
2004–2005	Bnei Sakhnin	19	(1)
2005	Hapoel Haifa	15	(5)
2005–2006	Maccabi Netanya	28	(2)
2006–2007	Hakoah Ramat Gan	19	(1)
2007–2008	Hapoel Ironi Rishon LeZion	30	(7)
2008–2009	Hapoel Acre	27	(4)
2009	Maccabi Ahi Nazareth	5	(0)
2010	F.C. Umm al-Fahm	14	(3)
2010–2011	Maccabi HaShikma Ramat Hen	14	(1)
2011	Hapoel Ramat Gan	5	(0)
2011–2012	Carl Zeiss Jena	4	(0)
2011	Carl Zeiss Jena II	6	(6)
2012–2015	Bnei Eilat	30	(3)

International career
2003	Israel U-21	3	(0)
- * Club domestic league appearances and goals

Shlomi Edri (Hebrew: שלומי אדרי; born May 29, 1982) is an Israeli footballer who is playing for Bnei Eilat in Liga Alef. In the 2011–2012 season he has played for the German club, Carl Zeiss Jena.
