= Carlos Chacana =

Argentine footballer (born 1976)

Carlos Chacana קרלוס צ'קאנה
Personal information
- Full name: Carlos Alberto Chacana
- Date of birth: 23 June 1976 (age 50)
- Place of birth: San Miguel de Tucumán, Argentina
- Height: 1.76 m (5 ft 9 in)
- Position: Winger

Team information
- Current team: Dizengoff Tel Aviv

Youth career
- 1992–1997: San Martín de Tucumán

Senior career*
Years	Team	Apps	(Gls)
1997–2001	San Martín de Tucumán	70	(11)
2001–2002	River Plate	0	(0)
2002	Quilmes	6	(0)
2003	Al Arabi Kuwait	?	(?)
2003–2004	Hapoel Nazareth Illit	?	(?)
2004–2005	Hapoel Ashkelon	0	(15)
2005	Hapoel Kfar Saba	1	(0)
2006	Ironi Kiryat Shmona	13	(4)
2006–2008	Hapoel Ramat Gan	64	(10)
2008–2009	NK Celje	15	(2)
2009–2013	Hapoel Ramat Gan	118	(11)
2013–2014	Hapoel Ashkelon	35	(3)
2014–2015	San Martín de Tucumán	4	(0)
2016–2018	Hapoel Kfar Shalem	69	(13)
2018–2019	F.C. Ironi Or Yehuda	33	(5)
2019–2020	Hapoel Kiryat Ono	16	(2)
2020–2025	HaMakhtesh Givatayim	69	(58)
2023–2024	→ Maccabi HaShikma Ramat Hen (loan)	8	(1)
2024–2025	→ Bnei Herzliya	28	(5)
2025–	Maccabi HaShikma Ramat Hen	15	(1)
2026–	→ Dizengoff Tel Aviv	3	(0)
- * Club domestic league appearances and goals as of 1 March 2026

Carlos Chacana (Hebrew: קרלוס צ'קאנה; born 23 June 1976) is an Argentine-Israeli professional footballer who plays as a winger fo Agudat HaMakhtesh.

== Biography ==
Born in San Miguel de Tucumán, Carlos Chacana was raised in Tucumán Province in Argentina by his mother and grandfather, after his father left when he was a child. He says that after every goal he scores, he says a prayer for his grandfather. Chacana began to play football in his neighborhood and local tournaments. He was scared at first about playing actual club football though because he did not have enough money for shoes.

== Career ==
=== Start in Argentina ===
At the age of 16, Chacana began training with Club Atlético San Martín de Tucumán after being pressured to by his grandfather. The club supplied Chacana with a pair of football boots and occasionally with transportation to training. In 1997, he played his first professional match for San Martín in a Primera B Nacional match. Slowly, he cracked the first team and started to score goals. During a league match against Club Atlético Tucumán, officials from River Plate were impressed by his play. The next day Chacana found himself on a bus to Buenos Aires.

The players at River Plate gave him the nickname, "El Burrito de Tucumán" because of the resemblance between him and Ariel Ortega. Because Chacana entered though in midseason, he could only take part in Copa Libertadores matches. At the end of the season, Ramón Díaz was appointed manager and Chacana left for Quilmes.

=== Kuwait ===
After a short time at Quilmes, Chacana made his first departure to the Middle East. His time at Al Arabi was cut short due to the Iraq War.

=== Israel ===
In 2003 Chacana arrived at Liga Artzit side Hapoel Nazareth Illit. Club officials told him that since his wife, Priscila Radusky, is Jewish, he would receive special benefits as a new immigrant under the Law of Return. Originally, Chacana was not interested in immigrating, but was later convinced. After just one season, he was released by Nazareth Illit. He returned to San Martín de Tucumán but felt that he needed to return to Israel in order to prove people wrong. Israeli agent, Gilad Katsav, arranged for him to join Hapoel Ashkelon where he became an instant success and fan favorite. He was given a new nickname in Ashkelon, "El Loco Lindo" and achieved celebrity in the city. During his season at Ashkelon, the club reached the semi-final of the Israel State Cup and gained promotion to the Liga Leumit

After a short term at Hapoel Kfar Saba, Chacana left for Ironi Kiryat Shmona. When the season ended, Chacana signed a US $50,000 contract with Hapoel Ramat Gan of the Liga Leumit, despite having an offer from F.C. Ashdod in the Israeli Premier League. The primary reason for Chacana's signing with Ramat Gan, was because a fan of the club was willing to pay for the entire treatment of his sons bout with leukemia.

When his contract ended with Hapoel Ramat Gan, he had an unsuccessful trial with Maccabi Petah Tikva. Though having more offers from Israeli clubs, Chacana signed a new one-year deal with Slovenian side, NK MIK CM Celje. During his debut match against NK Maribor, he scored his team's second goal in a 3:3 draw. His family remained in Israel though, where his son underwent further treatments at Sheba Medical Center.

== Honours ==
Hapoel Ashkelon

- Liga Artzit: 2004–05
- Toto Cup Artzit: 2004–05

Hapoel Ramat Gan

- Liga Artzit: 2006–07
- Toto Cup Artzit: 2006–07
- Liga Leumit: 2011–12
- Toto Cup Leumit: 2011
- Israel State Cup: 2013

Al-Arabi SC

- GCC Champions League: 2003

Individual

- Liga Artzit top scorer: 2004–05
