= Fernando Fligman =

Argentine-Israeli footballer

Fernando Fligman פרננדו פליגמן
Personal information
- Full name: Fernando Nahuel Fligman פרננדו פליגמן
- Date of birth: 1 September 1983 (age 43)
- Place of birth: Argentina
- Height: 1.80 m (5 ft 11 in)
- Position: Striker

Team information
- Current team: Atlético Concepción

Youth career
- San Martín

Senior career*
Years	Team	Apps	(Gls)
2004	Maccabi Tel Aviv	1	(0)
2004–2005	→ Hapoel Ashkelon (loan)	-	(-)
2005	Atletico Ñuñorco	-	(-)
2006	Central Norte	-	(-)
2008–	Atlético Concepción	-	(-)
- * Club domestic league appearances and goals as of 00:24, 13 September 2009 (UTC)

Fernando Nahuel Fligman (Hebrew: פרננדו פליגמן; born 1 September 1983) is an Argentine-Israeli association football player who is currently with Atlético Concepción.

== Playing career ==
In 2004, Fligman signed a three-year contract with Maccabi Tel Aviv for $70,000 a year. Due to late registration, Maccabi could not register him as an Israeli player, even though he had immigrated under the terms of the Law of Return and is Jewish. Fligman made his league debut in a Premier League match between Maccabi Tel Aviv and Hapoel Be'er Sheva when he came on as a substitute in the 68th minute.

== Honours ==
=== Club ===
- Hapoel Ashkelon (Official Tournaments)
  - Liga Artzit: 2004–05

== Statistics ==
Club performance			League		Cup		League Cup		Continental		Total	
Season	Club	League	Apps	Goals	Apps	Goals	Apps	Goals	Apps	Goals	Apps	Goals
Israel			League		Israel State Cup		Toto Cup		Europe		Total	
2004	Maccabi Tel Aviv	Ligat ha'Al	1	0	0	0	0	0	0	0	1	0
2004–2005	Hapoel Ashkelon	Liga Artzit	-	-	-	-	-	-	-	-	-	-
Total	Israel		-	-	-	-	-	-	-	-	-	-
Career total			-	-	-	-	-	-	-	-	-	-
