= Omar Abdul Aziz =

Nigerian footballer (born 1985)

Omar Abdul Aziz عمر عبد العزيز
Personal information
- Full name: Omar Abdul Aziz
- Date of birth: 26 December 1985 (age 40)
- Place of birth: Nigeria
- Height: 5 ft 8 in (1.73 m)
- Position: Striker

Senior career*
Years	Team	Apps	(Gls)
2003–2004	Enyimba		
2004–2005	Maccabi Netanya	21	(5)
2005–2006	Hapoel Jerusalem		
2006–2007	FC Senec	2	(0)
2007–2008	Hapoel Nazareth Illit	20	(5)
2008–2009	Hapoel Acre	40	(5)
- * Club domestic league appearances and goals

Omar Abdul Aziz (Arabic: عمر عبد العزيز; Hebrew: עומר עבדול עזיז; born 26 December 1985) is a Nigerian football striker.

== Honours ==
- Liga Leumit:
  - Runner-up (2): 2004–05, 2008–09
- Toto Cup (Leumit):
  - Winner (1): 2004–05
