= Salah Hasarma =

Israeli footballer and manager

Salah Hasarma صالح حصارمة
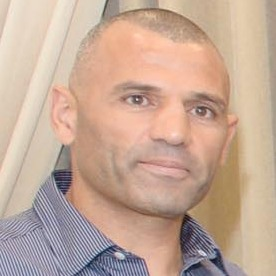

Personal information
- Full name: Salah Hasarma
- Date of birth: February 24, 1974 (age 52)
- Place of birth: Bi'ina, Israel
- Height: 6 ft 0 in (1.83 m)

Youth career
- Maccabi Bi'ina

Senior career*
Years	Team	Apps	(Gls)
1992–1994	Maccabi Bi'ina		
1994–1998	Hapoel Tayibe		
1998–2000	Bnei Sakhnin		
2000–2001	Hapoel Tayibe		
2001–2002	Bnei Sakhnin		
2002–2004	Bnei Yehuda	26	(1)
2004–2005	Hapoel Haifa	30	(3)
2005–2006	Bnei Sakhnin	31	(2)
2006–2013	Ironi Kiryat Shmona	215	(21)

Managerial career
- 2013–2015: Ironi Kiryat Shmona (U19)
- 2015–2016: Ironi Kiryat Shmona
- 2016–2020: Israel U16
- 2020–2021: F.C. Kafr Qasim
- 2021–2023: Bnei Sakhnin (U19)
- * Club domestic league appearances and goals

Salah Hasarma (Arabic: صالح حصارمة, Hebrew: סאלח חסארמה) is a retired Israeli footballer who works now as a manager.

== Honours ==
=== League ===
- Israeli Premier League (1):
  - 2011–12
- Israeli Second Division (3):
  - 1995-96, 2006-07, 2009-10

=== Cup ===
- Toto Cup (2):
  - 2010–11, 2011–12
- Toto Cup (Leumit) (2):
  - 2006–07, 2009–10
