= Hapoel Nir Ramat HaSharon F.C. =

Israeli football club

Hapoel Nir Ramat HaSharon
- Full name: Hapoel Nir Ramat HaSharon Football Club
- Founded: 1957; 68 years ago
- Ground: Grundman Stadium, Ramat HaSharon
- Capacity: 4,300
- Owner: Ramat HaSharon Municipality
- Chairman: Yitzhak Egelman
- Manager: Amir Nussbaum
- League: Liga Alef North
- 2024–25: Liga Leumit, 13th of 16 (relegated)
Home colours	Away colours

Hapoel Nir Ramat HaSharon Football Club (Hebrew: מועדון כדורגל הפועל ניר רמת השרון) is an Israeli football club based in Ramat HaSharon. Founded in 1957, the club is currently competing in Liga Alef, and plays its home matches at Grundman Stadium.

== History ==
The club was founded in 1957 as Hapoel Ramat HaSharon, the club was promoted to Liga Artzit (The second division back then) in 1984. In the 1984–85 season they narrowly missed out on promotion to Liga Leumit (then the top division), after losing 1–0 to Hapoel Jerusalem on the final day of the season; had they won, they would have been promoted in Jerusalem's place. The following season they were relegated to Liga Alef, and two seasons later to Liga Bet.

In 1996 the club returned to Liga Alef and in summer 1997 merged with Maccabi Nir Ramat HaSharon, a club which was named after Nir Itzhaki, by his brother and the club's chairmen, Meir Itzhaki, after Maccabi was refused funding by the local council. The merged club took the name Hapoel Ironi Nir Ramat HaSharon.

In 1999–2000 they finished second in their division. Due to Beitar Tel Aviv and Shimshon Tel Aviv merging, the club was promoted to Liga Artzit (now the third tier) to fill the vacancy. In 2002–03 they narrowly avoided relegation, finishing one place above the relegation zone. The following season they won the league to earn promotion back to the second division. In the same season they also won the Liga Artzit Toto Cup.

The club escaped relegation in 2004–05 after Maccabi Ahi Nazareth had two points deducted. The following season they finished third from bottom again, but avoided the drop.

In the 2009–10 season the club made one of its biggest achievements in the club's history when the team reached the semi-final of the Israel State Cup.

In the 2010–11 season the club won the Toto Cup Leumit and got promoted to the Israeli Premier League for the first time in the history of the club after they finished as champions of Liga Leumit. In June 2013, the club changed its name from Ironi Nir Ramat HaSharon to Hapoel Nir Ramat HaSharon and changed its logo.

In the 2012–13 season, the club achieved its best placing to date, when they finished sixth in the Israeli Premier League. However, in the following season, the club finished second bottom and relegated to Liga Leumit.

== Current squad ==
As of 8 February 2025

No.	Pos.	Nation	Player
4	DF	(Israel) ISR	Michael Merenstein
8	MF	(Israel) ISR	Roi Har
12	DF	(Israel) ISR	Ben Hayun
16	MF	(Israel) ISR	Omer Ifrah
18	MF	(Israel) ISR	Roy Zarzevski
21	MF	(Israel) ISR	Ido Madvil
28	DF	(Israel) ISR	Uri Magbo
39	FW	(Israel) ISR	Agam Hanoun
42	DF	(Israel) ISR	Rotem Garame

No.	Pos.	Nation	Player
44	MF	(Israel) ISR	Ido Gueta
55	DF	(Israel) ISR	Guy Raish
65	GK	(Israel) ISR	Itay Mashiah
77	FW	(Israel) ISR	Shay Balahssan
99	FW	(Israel) ISR	Yossi Bitton
—	GK	(Israel) ISR	Benjamin Machini
—	MF	(Israel) ISR	Eden Otachi
—	FW	(Israel) ISR	Yoel Abuhatzira

== Honours ==
=== League ===
Honour	No.	Years
Second tier	1	2010–11
Third tier	1	2003–04
Fourth tier	2	1966–68, 1978–79

=== Cups ===
Honour	No.	Years
Toto Cup (second division)	1	2010–11
Toto Cup (third division)	1	2003–04

== Managers ==
- (Israel) Tzvika Tzemah (July 1, 2004 – July 30, 2008)
- (Israel) Eran Kulik (2010)
- (Israel) Guy Levy (July 1, 2010 – June 30, 2011)
- (Israel) Meni Koretski (interim) (2011)
- (Israel) Yehoshua Feigenbaum (Dec 5, 2011 – May 13, 2012)
- (Israel) Nissan Yehezkel (May 14, 2012 – Sept 4, 2012)
- (Israel) Benny Tabak (Sept 4, 2012 – June 30, 2013)
- (Israel) Rafi Cohen (born 1965) (July 1, 2013 – Oct 7, 2013)
- (Israel) Haim Shabo (Oct 8, 2013 – Jun 8,2015)
- (Israel) Lior Zada (Jun 8, 2015–2016)
- (Israel) Meni Koretski (2016)
- (Israel) Haim Shabo (2016–2018)
- (Israel) Oren Rotem (2018)
- (Israel) Eli Cohen (2018–2019)
- (Israel) Noam Shoham (2019-)
