= Bryan Man =

Argentine-Israeli footballer (born 1983)

Bryan Man בריאן מן
Personal information
- Date of birth: 8 December 1983 (age 42)
- Place of birth: Argentina
- Position: Striker

Team information
- Current team: Hacoaj Buenos Aires
- Number: 7

Youth career
- Hapoel Ra'anana
- Maccabi Tel Aviv

Senior career*
Years	Team	Apps	(Gls)
2000–2005	Maccabi Tel Aviv	42	(11)
2004-2005	Hapoel Ra'anana	-	(-)
2004–2005	Quilmes Atlético Club		
2005	Bnei Yehuda	10	(03)
2006	Hapoel Ramat Gan	1	(0)
2006–2007	Hapoel Ra'anana	17	(2)
2007–2008	Maccabi HaShikma Ramat Hen	30	(21)
2008–2010	Hapoel Ashkelon	56	(23)
2011 – ?	Maccabi Buenos Aires	-	(?)

International career^{‡}
1999	Israel U16	3	(0)
- * Club domestic league appearances and goals as of 08:49, 23 January 2016 (UTC) ‡ National team caps and goals as of 08:49, 23 January 2016 (UTC)

Brian Alberto Men (Hebrew: בריאן מן; born 8 December 1983) is an Argentine-Israeli professional football (soccer) player.

== Biography ==
=== Early life ===
Man made aliyah with his family in 1990 under the Law of Return. His parents had a difficult time adapting to live in Israel, so they returned to Argentina. Bryan and his sister Michelle returned to Israel though.

=== Playing career ===
After going through the ranks of Maccabi Tel Aviv's youth academy, Man did not play often Nir Klinger. Man himself attributes this to Klinger's preference of foreign strikers and not domestic strikers from the youth ranks. Later he played with small scale clubs, and in June 2010 was released from Hapoel Ashkelon. He is a free agent and lives in Ashkelon.

=== National team career ===
Man made his debut for a national side when he appeared for the Israel national under-16 football team on 29 December 1999, when they played their Swiss counterparts in a locally organized tournament. He ended up playing two more games in the following two days against the Turkish and Austrian sides. He is eligible to play for Israel and Argentina national teams.

=== Personal life ===
Man has five tattoos, including a tattoo of the number 7 (his preferred shirt number) and of the crest of his favorite football club
