= Hapoel Ironi Ashkelon F.C. =

Israeli football club

Hapoel Ashkelon
- Full name: Hapoel Ashkelon Football Club מועדון כדורגל הפועל אשקלון
- Founded: 1955; 2024 (as "Ironi Ashkelon")
- Ground: Sala Stadium, Ashkelon
- Capacity: 5,250
- Manager: Yair Azulay
- League: Liga Gimel South
| Home colours | Away colours |

Hapoel Ashkelon F.C. (Hebrew: מועדון כדורגל הפועל אשקלון, Moadon Kaduregel Hapoel Ashkelon) was an Israeli football club based in Ashkelon. It was reestablished in 2024 as "Ironi Ashkelon".

== History ==
After being founded in 1955, Hapoel Ashkelon spent their first few decades in the lower leagues of Israeli football. 1995–96 they won Liga Alef South division and promoted to Liga Artzit (then the second tier) and in 1996–97, they achieved second successive promotion, to Liga Leumit (then the top tier) as Liga Artzit champions. However, the club finished bottom of the division, with a points deduction. In 1999–2000, they were relegated to the third tier (which became Liga Artzit following the formation of the Israeli Premier League as the top tier in 1999), before returning to the second tier (now Liga Leumit), after winning Liga Artzit in the 2004–05 season. The club reached the State Cup final for the first time in 2007, but despite taking the lead, lost 5–4 on penalties to Hapoel Tel Aviv after a 1–1 draw. At the end of the season, the club finished 11th and relegated to Liga Artzit.

In 2008–09, the club finished as runners-up in Liga Artzit and promoted back to Liga Leumit.

In 2009–10, the club finished as runners-up in Liga Leumit and promoted back to the Israeli Premier League. Just a season later, the club finished 15th, and relegated back to Liga Leumit.

In 2013–14, the club finished 15th in Liga Leumit, and relegated to Liga Alef. The club made an immediate return to Liga Leumit, after winning Liga Alef South division in the following season. In 2015–16, the club won the Leumit Toto Cup following a victory of 1–0 against F.C. Ashdod. At the end of the season, they finished as runners-up and made a return to the Israeli Premier League, their second successive promotion under the guidance of Yuval Naim.

=== Little Argentina ===
Over the years, Hapoel Ashkelon has developed a tradition of signing Argentine footballers, both Jewish and non-Jewish. Many times, there were two Argentine players who played together and developed an attacking partnership together. Among those who have represented Argentina within the squad have been Bryan Man, Carlos Chacana, Naón Isidro, Jonny Tennenbaum, Fernando Fligman and Gastón Sangoy.

=== Relegation and Dissolution ===
In the 2022/23 Liga Bet season, Hapoel Ashkelon faced a devastating 9–0 defeat against Bnei Ashdod, leading to their relegation to Liga Gimel. Subsequently, the club dissolved, citing financial and organizational challenges. However, in the following season (2023/2024), Hapoel Ashkelon did not sign up for participation in Liga Gimel, The lack of support from the Ashkelon Municipality also played a pivotal role in the club's downfall. This lack of backing contributed to Hapoel Ashkelon's decline from the first league to the lowest league within a span of just six years, marking a somber end to the once-prominent football club's presence in the competitive football landscape.

=== Refoundation ===
In summer 2024 the club refounded in Liga Gimel as "Ironi Ashkelon".

== Notable former managers ==
- Rafi Cohen (born 1965)
