= 2007–08 Beitar Jerusalem F.C. season =

Beitar Jerusalem
2007-08 season
- Chairman: (Russia) Arcadi Gaydamak
- Manager: (Israel) Itzhak Shum
- Ligat Ha'Al: 1st
- State Cup: Winners
- Toto Cup: Semi-finals
- Top goalscorer: League: Rômulo(12); All: Rômulo(16)
- Highest home attendance: 21,000 Vs. Copenhagen (CL Q2, 7 August 2007)
- Lowest home attendance: 7,000 Vs. Bnei Yehuda F.C. (10 May 2008)
- Average home league attendance: 13,500
| Home colours | Away colours |

The 2007–08 season is Beitar Jerusalem's 39th season in the Israeli Premier League.

It won the Championship and State Cup, making that season the most successful in all Beitar history at the time.

== First team ==
Note: Flags indicate national team as defined under FIFA eligibility rules; some limited exceptions apply. Players may hold more than one non-FIFA nationality.

| No. | Pos. | Nation | Player |
|---|---|---|---|
| 1 | GK | CRO | Tvrtko Kale |
| 2 | DF | CHI | Cristián Álvarez |
| 3 | DF | ISR | David Amsalem (captain) |
| 4 | DF | ISR | Arik Benado (vice captain) |
| 5 | DF | ISR | Shimon Gershon |
| 6 | DF | ISR | Tomer Ben Yosef |
| 7 | FW | ISR | Amit Ben Shushan |
| 8 | MF | ISR | Aviram Baruchyan |
| 9 | FW | ISR | Barak Itzhaki |
| 10 | FW | ISR | Toto Tamuz |
| 11 | MF | ISR | Idan Tal |
| 12 | DF | ISR | Shmuel Kozokin |

| No. | Pos. | Nation | Player |
|---|---|---|---|
| 14 | DF | ISR | Yoav Ziv |
| 15 | MF | ISR | Michael Zandberg |
| 19 | MF | ISR | Gal Alberman |
| 20 | MF | GHA | Derek Boateng |
| 22 | GK | ISR | Sagi Strauss |
| 23 | MF | PER | Junior Viza |
| 24 | MF | ISR | Shai Haddad |
| 25 | DF | ISR | Matan Barashi |
| 26 | FW | ISR | Hen Azriel |
| 28 | FW | BRA | Rômulo |
| 30 | GK | ISR | Ariel Harush |

== Ligat Ha'Al (Premier League) ==
| 19 August 2007 1 | Beitar Jerusalem | 3 – 0 | Bnei Yehuda | Jerusalem, Israel |
| 20:50 | Tamuz 12'; Zandberg 62'; Álvarez 87' | | | Stadium: Teddy Stadium; Attendance: 11,500 |

| 26 August 2007 2 | Hapoel Tel Aviv | 1 – 2 | Beitar Jerusalem | Tel Aviv, Israel |
| 20:50 | Júnior 39' | | Rômulo 75'; Itzhaki 79' | Stadium: Bloomfield Stadium; Attendance: 14,500 |

| 15 September 2007 3 | Beitar Jerusalem | 4 – 2 | Maccabi Herzliya | Jerusalem, Israel |
| 19:30 | Rômulo 45,62'; Baruchyan 55,67' | | Malka 3'; Buksenbaum 27' | Stadium: Teddy Stadium; Attendance: 9,500 |

| 30 September 2007 4 | Bnei Sakhnin | 2 – 2 | Beitar Jerusalem | Sakhnin, Israel |
| 20:50 | Yavourian 15'; Buzaglo 43' | | Rômulo 2'; Itzhaki 85' | Stadium: Doha Stadium; Attendance: 5,500 |

| 7 October 2007 5 | Beitar Jerusalem | 5 – 0 | FC Ashdod | Jerusalem, Israel |
| 19:30 | Rômulo 35,64'; Baruchyan 52'; Zandberg 75'; Tal 89' | | | Stadium: Teddy Stadium; Attendance: 12,500 |

| 20 October 2007 6 | Maccabi Petah Tikva | 1 – 2 | Beitar Jerusalem | Petah Tikva, Israel |
| 19:35 | Golan 15' | | Ben Shushan 44,63' | Stadium: Petah Tikva Municipal Stadium; Attendance: 5,500 |

| 28 October 2007 7 | Beitar Jerusalem | 2 – 0 | Maccabi Tel Aviv | Jerusalem, Israel |
| 20:50 | Itzhaki 16'; Boateng 90+2' | | | Stadium: Teddy Stadium; Attendance: 19,000 |

| 4 November 2007 8 | Maccabi Haifa | 0 – 0 | Beitar Jerusalem | Haifa, Israel |
| 20:50 | | | | Stadium: Kiryat Eliezer Stadium; Attendance: 13,500 |

| 10 November 2007 9 | Beitar Jerusalem | 0 – 0 | Ironi Kiryat Shmona | Jerusalem, Israel |
| 19:30 | | | | Stadium: Teddy Stadium; Attendance: 10,000 |

| 25 November 2007 10 | Maccabi Netanya | 0 – 1 | Beitar Jerusalem | Netanya, Israel |
| 20:50 | | | Rômulo 63' | Stadium: Kufsa; Attendance: 5,500 |

| 1 December 2007 11 | Beitar Jerusalem | 4 – 0 | Hapoel Kfar Saba | Jerusalem, Israel |
| 19:30 | Tal 33'; Rômulo 55'; Tamuz 84'; Alberman 88' | | | Stadium: Teddy Stadium; Attendance: 11,000 |

| 9 December 2007 12 | Bnei Yehuda | 0 – 3 | Beitar Jerusalem | Tel Aviv, Israel |
| 20:50 | | | Tal 45'; Alberman 73,82' | Stadium: Bloomfield Stadium; Attendance: 7,500 |

| 16 December 2007 13 | Beitar Jerusalem | 1 – 0 | Hapoel Tel Aviv | Jerusalem, Israel |
| 20:50 | Álvarez 44' | | | Stadium: Teddy Stadium; Attendance: 20,000 |

| 5 January 2008 14 | Maccabi Herzliya | 1 – 1 | Beitar Jerusalem | Herzliya, Israel |
| 19:30 | Menashe 41' | | Tal 52' | Stadium: Herzliya Municipal Stadium; Attendance: 5,500 |

| 12 January 2008 15 | Beitar Jerusalem | 0 – 1 | Bnei Sakhnin | Jerusalem, Israel |
| 19:30 | | | Buzaglo 89' | Stadium: Teddy Stadium*Redius Game |

| 20 January 2008 16 | FC Ashdod | 1 – 2 | Beitar Jerusalem | Ashdod, Israel |
| 20:50 | Revivo 41' | | Rômulo 32'; Baruchyan 63' | Stadium: Yud Alef Stadium; Attendance: 5,500 |

| 26 January 2008 17 | Beitar Jerusalem | 2 – 1 | Maccabi Petah Tikva | Jerusalem, Israel |
| 19:00 | Ben Shushan 13'; Baruchyan 60' | | Damari 85' | Stadium: Teddy Stadium; Attendance: 9,000 |

| 3 February 2008 18 | Maccabi Tel Aviv | 0 – 0 | Beitar Jerusalem | Tel Aviv, Israel |
| 20:50 | | | | Stadium: Bloomfield Stadium; Attendance: 14,500 |

| 16 February 2008 20 | Ironi Kiryat Shmona | 0 – 3 | Beitar Jerusalem | Kiryat Shmona, Israel |
| 19:30 | | | Rômulo 15'; Alberman 45'; Ben Shushan 69' | Stadium: Kiryat Shmona Municipal Stadium; Attendance: 3,500 |

| 19 February 2008 19 | Beitar Jerusalem | 1 – 0 | Maccabi Haifa | Jerusalem, Israel |
| 20:00 | Ben Shushan 16' | | | Stadium: Teddy Stadium; Attendance: 16,000 |

| 24 February 2008 21 | Beitar Jerusalem | 2 – 0 | Maccabi Netanya | Jerusalem, Israel |
| 20:00 | Tal 43'; Alberman 89' | | | Stadium: Teddy Stadium; Attendance: 11,000 |

| 2 March 2008 22 | Hapoel Kfar Saba | 1 – 1 | Beitar Jerusalem | Kfar Saba, Israel |
| 19:30 | Dayan 90' | | Rômulo 1' | Stadium: Levita Stadium; Attendance: 5,500 |

| 8 March 2008 23 | Maccabi Haifa | 0 – 1 | Beitar Jerusalem | Haifa, Israel |
| 19:30 | | | Boateng 1' | Stadium: Kiryat Eliezer Stadium; Attendance: 13,500 |

| 15 March 2008 24 | Beitar Jerusalem | 4 – 0 | Maccabi Petah Tikva | Jerusalem, Israel |
| 19:15 | Ben Shushan 17'; Baruchyan 63'; Tal 73'; Rômulo 90' | | | Stadium: Teddy Stadium; Attendance: 12,000 |

| 22 March 2008 25 | Hapoel Kfar Saba | 0 – 4 | Beitar Jerusalem | Kfar Saba, Israel |
| 19:30 | | | Boateng 12'; Ziv 43'; Alberman 65'; Tal 86' | Stadium: Levita Stadium; Attendance: 5,500 |

| 30 March 2008 26 | Beitar Jerusalem | 1 – 1 | Maccabi Tel Aviv | Jerusalem, Israel |
| 20:50 | Boateng 53' | | Shivhon 28' | Stadium: Teddy Stadium; Attendance: 18,000 |

| 6 April 2008 27 | Hapoel Tel Aviv | 3 – 1 | Beitar Jerusalem | Tel Aviv, Israel |
| 20:50 | Dego 29'; Junior 40'; Telkisky 71' | | Zandberg 8' | Stadium: Bloomfield Stadium; Attendance: 14,500 |

| 5 May 2008 29 | FC Ashdod | 1 – 0 | Beitar Jerusalem | Ashdod, Israel |
| 20:50 | Tzokol 71' | | | Stadium: Yud Alef Stadium; Attendance: 6,500 |

| 10 May 2008 30 | Beitar Jerusalem | 0 – 1 | Bnei Yehuda | Jerusalem, Israel |
| 19:30 | | | Biton 39' | Stadium: Teddy Stadium; Attendance: 7,000 |

| 17 May 2008 31 | Beitar Jerusalem | 3 – 0 | Maccabi Netanya | Jerusalem, Israel |
| 19:30 | Baruchyan 33'; Zandberg 56'; Tamuz 61' | | | Stadium: Teddy Stadium; Attendance: 13,500 |

| 20 May 2008 28 | Beitar Jerusalem | 3 – 1 | Maccabi Herzliya | Jerusalem, Israel |
| 19:30 | Álvarez 11'; Baruchyan 14'; Alberman 89' | | Reikan 52' | Stadium: Teddy Stadium; Attendance: 10,500 |

| 24 May 2008 32 | Ironi Kiryat Shmona | 3 – 2 | Beitar Jerusalem | Kiryat Shmona, Israel |
| 19:00 | Oforoi 30'; Kojok 51'; Avidor 88' | | Tamuz 29,32' | Stadium: Kiryat Shmona Municipal Stadium; Attendance: 4,500 |

| 30 May 2008 33 | Beitar Jerusalem | 1 – 2 | Bnei Sakhnin | Jerusalem, Israel |
| 16:00 | Tamuz 66' | | Buzaglo 7'; Bugdan 79' | Stadium: Teddy Stadium; Attendance: 11,000 |

=== League table ===
| Pos | Team | Pld | W | D | L | GF | GA | GD | Pts | Qualification or relegation |
|---|---|---|---|---|---|---|---|---|---|---|
| 1 | Beitar Jerusalem (C) | 33 | 20 | 7 | 6 | 61 | 23 | +38 | 67 | Qualification for the Champions League second qualifying round |
| 2 | Maccabi Netanya | 33 | 16 | 10 | 7 | 40 | 24 | +16 | 58 | Qualification for the UEFA Cup second qualifying round |
| 3 | Ironi Kiryat Shmona | 33 | 15 | 11 | 7 | 43 | 34 | +9 | 56 | Qualification for the UEFA Cup first qualifying round |
| 4 | Bnei Sakhnin | 33 | 15 | 10 | 8 | 35 | 29 | +6 | 55 | Qualification for the Intertoto Cup second round |
| 5 | Maccabi Haifa | 33 | 13 | 8 | 12 | 38 | 27 | +11 | 47 | |

Source: The Israel Football Association
Rules for classification: 1) points; 2) goal difference; 3) number of goals scored.
(C) Champions

== State Cup ==
| 27 February 2008 Round of 32 | Bnei Sakhnin | 1 – 1 (a.e.t.) (1 – 3 p) | Beitar Jerusalem | Sakhnin, Israel |
| 20:15 | Yavruyan 52' | | Zandberg 26' | Stadium: Doha Stadium; Attendance: 5,500 |
| | Penalties |
| | Culma (penalty scored); Yavruyan (penalty missed); Ganayem (penalty missed); Buzaglo (penalty missed) | | (penalty scored) Alberman; (penalty scored) Tal; (penalty missed) Gershon; (penalty scored) Rômulo |

| 11 March 2008 Round of 16 | Maccabi Ahi Nazareth | 0 – 3 | Beitar Jerusalem | Nazareth, Israel |
| 20:15 | | | Zandberg 47'; Baruchyan 75'; Alberman 90' | Stadium: Ilut Stadium; Attendance: 4,500 |

| 2 April 2008 Quarter-final | Beitar Jerusalem | 3 – 2 | Hapoel Kfar Saba | Jerusalem, Israel |
| 19:00 | Ben Shushan 1,27'; Ziv 85' | | Gonzales 73'; Talker 75' | Stadium: Teddy Stadium; Attendance: 14,500 |

| 16 April 2008 Semi-final | Beitar Jerusalem | 1 – 0 (a.e.t.) | Maccabi Netanya | Ramat Gan, Israel |
| 21:00 | Ziv 102' | | | Stadium: Ramat Gan Stadium; Attendance: 30,000 |

| 13 May 2008 Final | Hapoel Tel Aviv | 0 – 0 (a.e.t.) (4 – 5 p) | Beitar Jerusalem | Ramat Gan, Israel |
| 20:30 | | | | Stadium: Ramat Gan Stadium; Attendance: 40,000 |
| | Penalties |
| | Antebi (penalty scored); Badir (penalty scored); Júnior (penalty scored); Abutbul (penalty scored); Dego (penalty missed); Oved (penalty missed) | | (penalty scored) Alberman; (penalty scored) Zandberg; (penalty scored) Tal; (penalty missed) Boateng; (penalty scored) Tamuz; (penalty scored) Gershon |

== UEFA Champions League ==
=== Second qualifying round ===
| 31 July 2007 First leg | FC Copenhagen (Denmark) | 1 – 0 | (Israel) Beitar Jerusalem | Copenhagen, Denmark |
| 20:00 | Allbäck 5' | | | Stadium: Parken Stadium; Attendance: 19,500 |

| 7 August 2007 Second leg | Beitar Jerusalem (Israel) | 1 – 1 (a.e.t.) (1 – 2 agg.) | (Denmark) FC Copenhagen | Jerusalem, Israel |
| 21:00 | Itzhaki 61' | | Allbäck 103' | Stadium: Teddy Stadium; Attendance: 21,000 |
