= 2007–08 in Israeli football =

Football in Israel
- Season: 2007–08

The 2007–08 season was the 76th season of competitive football in Israel.

== 2007–08 Israeli Premier League ==
Pos	Team	Pld	W	D	L	GF	GA	GD	Pts	Qualification or relegation
1	Beitar Jerusalem (C)	33	20	7	6	61	23	+38	67	Qualification for the Champions League second qualifying round
2	Maccabi Netanya	33	16	10	7	40	24	+16	58	Qualification for the UEFA Cup second qualifying round
3	Ironi Kiryat Shmona	33	15	11	7	43	34	+9	56	Qualification for the UEFA Cup first qualifying round
4	Bnei Sakhnin	33	15	10	8	35	29	+6	55	Qualification for the Intertoto Cup second round
5	Maccabi Haifa	33	13	8	12	38	27	+11	47	
6	Maccabi Tel Aviv	33	11	8	14	43	43	0	41	
7	Hapoel Tel Aviv	33	12	5	16	35	40	−5	41	Qualification for the UEFA Cup first qualifying round (Note: Since Beitar Jerusalem won both Israeli State Cup and the Israeli Premier League championship, then the cup-runner-up, Hapoel Tel Aviv, awarded with entry to the 2008–09 UEFA Cup.)
8	F.C. Ashdod	33	11	6	16	36	52	−16	39	
9	Bnei Yehuda	33	11	5	17	31	43	−12	38	
10	Maccabi Petah Tikva	33	10	7	16	28	39	−11	37	
11	Hapoel Kfar Saba (R)	33	9	10	14	37	54	−17	37	Relegation to Liga Leumit
12	Maccabi Herzliya (R)	33	7	9	17	32	51	−19	30	Relegation to Liga Leumit

Source: The Israel Football Association
Rules for classification: 1) points; 2) goal difference; 3) number of goals scored.
(C) Champions; (R) Relegated

=== Israeli Premier League Transfers 2007–08 ===
List of Israeli football transfers 2007–08

== 2007–08 Liga Leumit ==
Pos	Team	Pld	W	D	L	GF	GA	GD	Pts	Promotion or relegation
1	Hakoah Amidar Ramat Gan	33	16	9	8	41	30	+11	57	Promoted to Premier League
2	Hapoel Petah Tikva	33	16	6	11	40	27	+13	54	Promoted to Premier League
3	Hapoel Haifa	33	15	7	11	36	29	+7	52	
4	Hapoel Be'er Sheva	33	14	9	10	31	18	+13	51	
5	Hapoel Bnei Lod	33	14	7	12	41	42	−1	49	
6	Hapoel Ramat Gan	33	13	9	11	33	38	−5	48	
7	Hapoel Ra'anana	33	11	13	9	34	31	+3	46	
8	Ironi Ramat HaSharon	33	11	10	12	33	37	−4	43	
9	Maccabi Ahi Nazareth	33	10	11	12	37	39	−2	41	
10	Hapoel Acre	33	9	10	14	29	32	−3	37	
11	Ironi Rishon LeZion	33	7	16	10	31	38	−7	37	Relegated to Liga Artzit
12	Hapoel Nazareth Illit	33	5	7	21	28	53	−25	22	Relegated to Liga Artzit

== 2007–08 State Cup ==
2007–08 Israel State Cup Final:

May 13, 2008

Hapoel Tel Aviv	4 – 5 (p) 0 – 0 (a.e.t.)	Beitar Jerusalem
Yigal Antebi (pen.); Walid Badir (pen.); Fábio Jr. (pen.); Shay Abutbul (pen.); Baruch Dego (penalty missed); Reuven Oved (penalty missed)		Gal Alberman (pen.); Michael Zandberg (pen.); Idan Tal (pen.); Derek Boateng (penalty missed); Toto Tamuz (pen.); Shimon Gershon (pen.)

Ramat Gan Stadium, Ramat Gan
Attendance: 41,000
Referee: Meir Levi

Beitar Jerusalem wins the 2007–08 Israeli State Cup

== 2007–08 Toto Cup Al ==
Maccabi Haifa wins the 2007–08 Toto Cup Al.

== European Competitions ==
=== 2007–08 UEFA Champions League ===
Second Qualifying Round

Team 1	Agg.	Team 2	1st leg	2nd leg
F.C. Copenhagen (Denmark)	2 – 1	(Israel) Beitar Jerusalem	1 – 0	1 – 1

=== 2007–08 UEFA Cup ===
First Qualifying Round

Team 1	Agg.	Team 2	1st leg	2nd leg
FC Santa Coloma (Andorra)	1 – 4	(Israel) Maccabi Tel Aviv	1 – 0	0 – 4

Second Qualifying Round

Team 1	Agg.	Team 2	1st leg	2nd leg
UD Leiria (Portugal)	1 – 0	(Israel) Maccabi Netanya	0 – 0	1 – 0
Maccabi Tel Aviv (Israel)	2 – 4	(Turkey) Kayseri Erciyesspor	1 – 1	1 – 3
NK Široki Brijeg (Bosnia and Herzegovina)	0 – 6	(Israel) Hapoel Tel Aviv	0 – 3	0 – 3

First Round

Team 1	Agg.	Team 2	1st leg	2nd leg
Hapoel Tel Aviv (Israel)	1 – 0	(Sweden) AIK	0 – 0	1 – 0

Group Stage

Pos	Team	Pld	W	D	L	GF	GA	GD	Pts	Qualification	GET	TOT	AND	AAB	HTA
1	(Spain) Getafe	4	3	0	1	7	5	+2	9	Advance to knockout stage	—	—	2–1	—	1–2
2	(England) Tottenham Hotspur	4	2	1	1	7	5	+2	7	Advance to knockout stage	1–2	—	—	3–2	—
3	(Belgium) Anderlecht	4	1	2	1	5	4	+1	5	Advance to knockout stage	—	1–1	—	—	2–0
4	(Denmark) AaB	4	1	1	2	7	7	0	4		1–2	—	1–1	—	—
5	(Israel) Hapoel Tel Aviv	4	1	0	3	3	8	−5	3		—	0–2	—	1–3	—

25 October 2007
Anderlecht	2 – 0	Hapoel Tel Aviv
8 November 2007
Hapoel Tel Aviv	0 – 2	Tottenham Hotspur
29 November 2007
Getafe	1 – 2	Hapoel Tel Aviv
19 December 2007
Hapoel Tel Aviv	1 – 3	Aalborg

=== 2007–08 UEFA Intertoto Cup ===
Second Round

Team 1	Agg.	Team 2	1st leg	2nd leg
Maccabi Haifa (Israel)	2 – 2 (p)	(Romania) CF Gloria 1922 Bistriţa	0 – 2	2 – 0

== National team ==
Date	Venue	Opponents	Score	Competition	Scorers
22 August 2007	Dinamo Stadium, Belarus (A)	Belarus	1 – 2	F	Shimon Gershon
8 September 2007	Wembley Stadium, London (A)	England	0 – 3	ECQ	--
13 October 2007	Maksimir Stadium, Zagreb (A)	Croatia	0 – 1	ECQ	--
17 October 2007	Ramat Gan Stadium, Ramat Gan (H)	Belarus	2 – 1	F	Gal Alberman, Aviram Baruchyan
17 November 2007	Ramat Gan Stadium, Ramat Gan (H)	Russia	2 – 1	ECQ	Elyaniv Barda, Omer Golan
21 November 2007	Ramat Gan Stadium, Ramat Gan (H)	North Macedonia	1 – 0	ECQ	Elyaniv Barda
6 February 2008	Ramat Gan Stadium, Ramat Gan (H)	Romania	1 – 0	F	Yossi Benayoun

Key

- H = Home match
- A = Away match
- F = Friendly
- ECQ = European Championship qualifier
