= List of 2007–08 Israeli football transfers =

This is a list of Israeli football transfers for the 2007–08 season. Only moves featuring at least one Israeli Premier League club are listed.

== 2007 ==
=== May ===
Date	Nat	Name	Moving from	Moving to	Fee
21 May 2007	(Argentina)	Javier Páez	Hapoel Tel Aviv	(Argentina) Olimpo	Free
23 May 2007	(Australia)	Scott Higgins	Maccabi Herzliya	Adelaide United	Free
22 May 2007	(Brazil)	Ramalho	Beitar Jerusalem	Maccabi Tel Aviv	Free
22 May 2007	(Brazil)	Schwenck	Beitar Jerusalem	(South Korea) Pohang Steelers	Free
22 May 2007	(Brazil)	Tuto	Beitar Jerusalem	(Brazil) São Caetano	Free
24 May 2007	(Chile)	Manuel Neira	Hapoel Tel Aviv	(Chile) Unión Española	Free
24 May 2007	(Israel)	Hamudi Brick	Bnei Sakhnin	Hapoel Acre	Free
25 May 2007	(Nigeria)	Ibezito Ogbonna	Hapoel Tel Aviv	(Romania) CFR Cluj	Free
25 May 2007	(Ghana)	Omar Sanny	Bnei Sakhnin	Hapoel Acre	Free
29 May 2007	(Chile)	Sebastián Rozental	Maccabi Petah Tikva	Maccabi Netanya	Free
29 May 2007	(Cameroon)	Emmanuel Emangoa	Hapoel Ashkelon	Ironi Kiryat Shmona	Free
30 May 2007	(Israel)	Avishay Jano	Maccabi Netanya	Ironi Tiberias	Free
30 May 2007	(Cameroon)	Patrick Suffo	Maccabi Petah Tikva	F.C. Ashdod	Free
31 May 2007	(France)	Yannick Kamanan	Maccabi Herzliya	Maccabi Tel Aviv	Free
31 May 2007	(Serbia)	Miljan Mrdaković	Maccabi Tel Aviv	(Portugal) Vitória S.C.	Free
31 May 2007	(Israel)	Eyal Shen	Hapoel Ashkelon	Hapoel Kfar Saba	Free
31 May 2007	(Israel)	Kfir Edri	Maccabi Herzliya	Hapoel Kfar Saba	Free
31 May 2007	(Chile)	Rafael Olarra	Maccabi Haifa	Universidad de Chile	Free

=== June ===
Date	Name	Nat	Moving from	Moving to	Fee
1 June 2007	Ivos Yovaldio	(Democratic Republic of the Congo)	Ironi Kiryat Shmona	Hapoel Petah Tikva	Free
1 June 2007	Idan Srur	(Israel)	Hapoel Petah Tikva	Hapoel Tel Aviv	Loan Return
1 June 2007	Tomer Haliva	(Israel)	F.C. Ashdod	Hapoel Tel Aviv	Loan Return
2 June 2007	Pati Yablanka	(Democratic Republic of the Congo)	Maccabi Herzliya	Bnei Sakhnin	Free
2 June 2007	Yeghia Yavruyan	(Armenia)	Ironi Kiryat Shmona	Bnei Sakhnin	Free
5 June 2007	Yossi Abukasis	(Israel)	Hapoel Tel Aviv	Retired	Retired
7 June 2007	Shavit Elimelech	(Israel)	Hapoel Tel Aviv	Ironi Kiryat Shmona	Free
7 June 2007	Aviv Haddad	(Israel)	Hapoel Ashkelon	Maccabi Tel Aviv	Undisclosed
7 June 2007	Benny Haddad	(Israel)	Bnei Sakhnin	Hakoah Amidar Ramat Gan	Free
7 June 2007	Israel Zviti	(Israel)	Maccabi Netanya	Hapoel Petah Tikva	Free
10 June 2007	Yaniv Elul	(Israel)	Bnei Yehuda Tel Aviv	F.C. Ashdod	Free
10 June 2007	Shalev Menashe	(Israel)	Hapoel Kfar Saba	F.C. Ashdod	Free
11 June 2007	Eliran Danin	(Israel)	Hapoel Kfar Saba	Beitar Jerusalem	Free
12 June 2007	Haim Megrelashvili	(Israel)	Maccabi Haifa	(Netherlands) Vitesse Arnhem	$400,000
14 June 2007	Dudu Biton	(Israel)	Beitar Nes Tubruk	Maccabi Tel Aviv	Free
15 June 2007	Assaf Mendes	(Israel)	Maccabi Netanya	Hapoel Acre	Free
16 June 2007	Ahmed Kasoum	(Israel)	Hapoel Petah Tikva	Bnei Sakhnin	Free
17 June 2007	Ronny Gafney	(Israel)	Beitar Jerusalem	Maccabi Haifa	Free
18 June 2007	José Filho Duarte	(Brazil)	Hapoel Kfar Saba	Bnei Yehuda	$50,000
18 June 2007	Yahav Youlzari	(Israel)	Bnei Yehuda	Hakoah Amidar Ramat Gan	Free
18 June 2007	Eyal Tartazki	(Israel)	Maccabi Herzliya	Hapoel Haifa	Free
19 June 2007	Itzik Kornfine	(Israel)	Beitar Jerusalem	Retired	Retired
19 June 2007	Dan Roman	(Israel)	Hakoah Amidar Ramat Gan	Maccabi Tel Aviv	Undisclosed
19 June 2007	Barak Badash	(Israel)	Bnei Yehuda	Hakoah Amidar Ramat Gan	Free
20 June 2007	Hen Ezra	(Israel)	Beitar Nes Tubruk	Maccabi Netanya	$50,000
20 June 2007	Lior Asulin	(Israel)	Bnei Yehuda	Hapoel Tel Aviv	$500,000
21 June 2007	Elyaniv Barda	(Israel)	Hapoel Tel Aviv	(Belgium) Racing Genk	$65,000
22 June 2007	Tvrtko Kale	(Croatia)	Maccabi Tel Aviv	Beitar Jerusalem	$300,000
22 June 2007	Haim Benon	(Israel)	Hapoel Nazareth Illit	Bnei Sakhnin	Free
23 June 2007	Reuven Oved	(Israel)	Bnei Yehuda	Hapoel Tel Aviv	Free
24 June 2007	Assi Domb	(Israel)	Bnei Yehuda	Hakoah Amidar Ramat Gan	Free
24 June 2007	Abedi	(Brazil)	(Brazil) Vasco da Gama	Hapoel Tel Aviv	Undisclosed
24 June 2007	Ohad Kadousi	(Israel)	Bnei Sakhnin	Maccabi Petah Tikva	Free
25 June 2007	Selver Hodžić	(Bosnia and Herzegovina)	(Switzerland) FC Thun	Bnei Yehuda	Undisclosed
25 June 2007	Rami Halis	(Israel)	Hapoel Ashkelon	Maccabi Herzliya	Free
25 June 2007	Tomer Tayar	(Israel)	Ironi Kiryat Shmona	F.C. Ashdod	Free
25 June 2007	Vincent Enyeama	(Nigeria)	Bnei Yehuda	Hapoel Tel Aviv	$600,000
25 June 2007	M'peti Nimba	(Democratic Republic of the Congo)	Ironi Kiryat Shmona	Hapoel Petah Tikva	Free
26 June 2007	Pieter Merlier	(Belgium)	(Belgium) S.V. Zulte Waregem	Maccabi Herzliya	Undisclosed
26 June 2007	Mitja Mörec	(Slovenia)	(Austria) SK Sturm Graz	Maccabi Herzliya	$130,000
26 June 2007	Sagi Strauss	(Israel)	Hapoel Nazareth Illit	Beitar Jerusalem	Free
27 June 2007	Gil Vermouth	(Israel)	Hapoel Tel Aviv	(Belgium) K.A.A. Gent	$330,000
28 June 2007	Salim Tuama	(Israel)	Hapoel Tel Aviv	(Belgium) Standard Liège	$1,300,000

=== July ===
Date	Name	Nat	Moving from	Moving to	Fee
1 July 2007	Kfir Udi	(Israel)	none	Maccabi Herzliya	Free
2 July 2007	Moshe Biton	(Israel)	Maccabi Tel Aviv	Bnei Yehuda	Free
2 July 2007	Nir Nachum	(Israel)	Hapoel Ashkelon	F.C. Ashdod	Free
4 July 2007	Dragoslav Jevrić	(Montenegro)	(Turkey) Ankaraspor	Maccabi Tel Aviv	Free
4 July 2007	Nsumbu Mazuwa	(Democratic Republic of the Congo)	Maccabi Netanya	Hapoel Tel Aviv	$80,000
4 July 2007	Neal Abarbanel	(Israel)	Hapoel Tel Aviv	Bnei Yehuda	Free
4 July 2007	Shai Banai	(Israel)	Hapoel Nazareth Illit	Maccabi Herzliya	Free
4 July 2007	Ze'ev Haimovich	(Israel)	Hapoel Petah Tikva	Bnei Yehuda	Free
5 July 2007	Orel Edri	(Israel)	Maccabi Yavne	Maccabi Tel Aviv	Free
5 July 2007	Oz Yifrach	(Israel)	Hapoel Be'er Sheva	Maccabi Tel Aviv	Free
5 July 2007	Emmanuel Pappoe	(Ghana)	Hapoel Kfar Saba	(Cyprus) AEK Larnaca	Free
5 July 2007	Yossi Rosen	(Israel)	Hakoah Amidar Ramat Gan	Bnei Yehuda	Free
5 July 2007	Dele Aiyenugba	(Nigeria)	(Nigeria) Enyimba	Bnei Yehuda	Free
5 July 2007	Mauricio Solis	(Costa Rica)	(Guatemala) Comunicaciones	Maccabi Netanya	Free
5 July 2007	Tomer Hemed	(Israel)	Maccabi Haifa	Bnei Sakhnin	Loan
6 July 2007	Łukasz Surma	(Poland)	(Poland) Legia Warszawa	Maccabi Haifa	Free
6 July 2007	Eden Ben-Basat	(Israel)	Maccabi Haifa	Hapoel Haifa	Loan
7 July 2007	Saïd Makasi	(Rwanda)	Hapoel Petah Tikva	Maccabi Herzliya	Free
7 July 2007	Yossi Biton	(Israel)	Hapoel Tel Aviv	Ironi Kiryat Shmona	Loan
8 July 2007	Ori Uzan	(Israel)	Maccabi Netanya	Hapoel Kfar Saba	Free
8 July 2007	Cristian Álvarez	(Chile)	(Chile) Universidad Católica	Beitar Jerusalem	Free
8 July 2007	Valdiram	(Brazil)	(Brazil) Vasco da Gama	F.C. Ashdod	Free
9 July 2007	Klemi Saban	(Israel)	(Romania) Steaua București	Maccabi Netanya	Free
10 July 2007	Yaniv Azran	(Israel)	F.C. Ashdod	Maccabi Tel Aviv	$775,000
10 July 2007	Lucien Mettomo	(Cameroon)	(Switzerland) FC Lucerne	Ironi Kiryat Shmona	Free
11 July 2007	Idan Tal	(Israel)	(England) Bolton Wanderers	Beitar Jerusalem	Free

== 2008 ==
=== May ===
Date	Nat	Name	Moving from	Moving to	Fee
6 May 2008	(France)	Gary Assous	(France) AS Cannes	Maccabi Netanya	Free
