= 2007–08 Toto Cup Al =

Tournament details
- Country: Israel
- Teams: 12

Final positions
- Champions: Maccabi Haifa (4th title)
- Runners-up: Bnei Sakhnin

Tournament statistics
- Matches played: 47
- Goals scored: 119 (2.53 per match)
- Top goal scorer(s): (Armenia) Yeghia Yavruyan (Brazil) Renato Ribeiro (6)

The 2007–08 Toto Cup Al was the 24th season of the third most important football tournament in Israel since its introduction and the third edition involving Premier League clubs only.

The final, played at Ramat Gan Stadium on 19 December 2007, was won by Maccabi Haifa, who had beaten Bnei Sakhnin 2–0 in the final.

== Format change ==
The 12 Premier League clubs were divided to three groups, with four teams in each group, playing a double round-robin tournament. The top two teams and the two best third-place finishers from the three groups advanced to the quarter-finals.

== Group stage ==
The matches were played from 4 August 2007 to 14 November 2007

=== Group A ===
Pos	Team	Pld	W	D	L	GF	GA	GD	Pts	MNE	MHA	ASH	MHE
1	Maccabi Netanya (A)	6	2	3	1	9	4	+5	9		1–1	3–1	4–0
2	Maccabi Haifa (A)	6	2	3	1	7	5	+2	9	1–0		0–0	2–4
3	F.C. Ashdod (A)	6	1	4	1	5	6	−1	7	0–0	0–0		3–2
4	Maccabi Herzliya	6	1	2	3	8	14	−6	5	1–1	0–3	1–1	

Source: football.org.il (in Hebrew)
Rules for classification: 1st points; 2nd goal difference; 3rd matches won; 4th goals scored; 5th head-to-head; 6th decision match
(A) Advanced to the quarter finals

=== Group B ===
Pos	Team	Pld	W	D	L	GF	GA	GD	Pts	BEI	BnY	HKS	HTA
1	Beitar Jerusalem (A)	6	4	1	1	14	4	+10	13		1–2	2–0	5–0
2	Bnei Yehuda (A)	6	4	1	1	10	6	+4	13	1–1		3–1	1–2
3	Hapoel Kfar Saba	6	1	1	4	8	12	−4	4	1–3	1–2		4–1
4	Hapoel Tel Aviv	6	1	1	4	4	14	−10	4	0–2	0–1	1–1	

Source: football.org.il (in Hebrew)
Rules for classification: 1st points; 2nd goal difference; 3rd matches won; 4th goals scored; 5th head-to-head; 6th decision match
(A) Advanced to the quarter finals

=== Group C ===
Pos	Team	Pld	W	D	L	GF	GA	GD	Pts	MTA	BnS	MPT	IKS
1	Maccabi Tel Aviv (A)	6	4	1	1	10	6	+4	13		2–1	2–0	2–1
2	Bnei Sakhnin (A)	6	3	1	2	9	6	+3	10	1–2		3–0	2–0
3	Maccabi Petah Tikva (A)	6	2	1	3	6	7	−1	7	0–1	2–0		3–0
4	Ironi Kiryat Shmona	6	0	3	3	5	11	−6	3	2–2	1–1	1–1	

Source: football.org.il (in Hebrew)
Rules for classification: 1st points; 2nd goal difference; 3rd matches won; 4th goals scored; 5th head-to-head; 6th decision match
(A) Advanced to the quarter finals

== Knockout rounds ==
=== Quarter-finals ===
Team 1	Agg.	Team 2	1st leg	2nd leg
Maccabi Haifa	2–0	Maccabi Tel Aviv	1–0	1–0
Bnei Yehuda	5–1	F.C. Ashdod	2–1	3–0
Maccabi Petah Tikva	2–3	Beitar Jerusalem	1–1	1–2
Bnei Sakhnin	3–0	Maccabi Netanya	2–0	1–0

=== Semifinals ===
12 December 2007	Bnei Sakhnin	1–1 (a.e.t.) (3–1 p)	Bnei Yehuda	Ramat Gan
16:45	Yavruyan 34'	Report	E. Biton 57'	Stadium: Ramat Gan Stadium; Referee: Alon Yefet
	Penalties
	Khalaila (penalty scored); Culma (penalty scored); Yavruyan (penalty scored)		(penalty missed) Rosen; (penalty missed) Hodžić; (penalty scored) Abu Siam; (penalty missed) Haimovich

12 December 2007	Maccabi Haifa	2–2 (a.e.t.) (8–7 p)	Beitar Jerusalem	Ramat Gan
19:45	Maimon 40'; Renato 76'	Report	Tal 18' (pen.); Alberman 59'	Stadium: Ramat Gan Stadium; Referee: Meir Levi
	Penalties
	Katan (penalty missed); Harazi (penalty scored); Renato (penalty scored); Afek (penalty scored); Gita (penalty scored); Maimon (penalty scored); Hanuka (penalty scored); Hemed (penalty scored); Paulinho (penalty scored)		(penalty scored) Alberman; (penalty scored) Zandber; (penalty scored) Gershon; (penalty missed) Azriel; (penalty scored) Tal; (penalty scored) Benado; (penalty scored) Ziv; (penalty scored) Boateng; (penalty missed) Kale

=== Final ===
19 December 2007
19:00

Maccabi Haifa	2–0	Bnei Sakhnin
Renato 53' (pen.), 87'	Report

Ramat Gan Stadium
Referee: Menashe Mashiah

== See also ==
- Toto Cup
- 2007–08 Israeli Premier League
- 2007–08 Toto Cup Leumit
