= Haliva (surname) =

Haliva is a Hebrew surname, a transliteration of any of חליוה, חליווה, חליבה. Notable people with the surname include:

- Aharon Haliva, former Israeli Major general (Aluf) who commanded the Israel Defense Forces' Military Intelligence Directorate
- Shlomo Haliva, Israeli serial rapist, murderer and suspected serial killer
- Tomer Haliva, Israeli footballer

== See also ==
- Haleva
- Halavi
- Haliva
- Halevi
