= Aviv Hadad =

Israeli football player

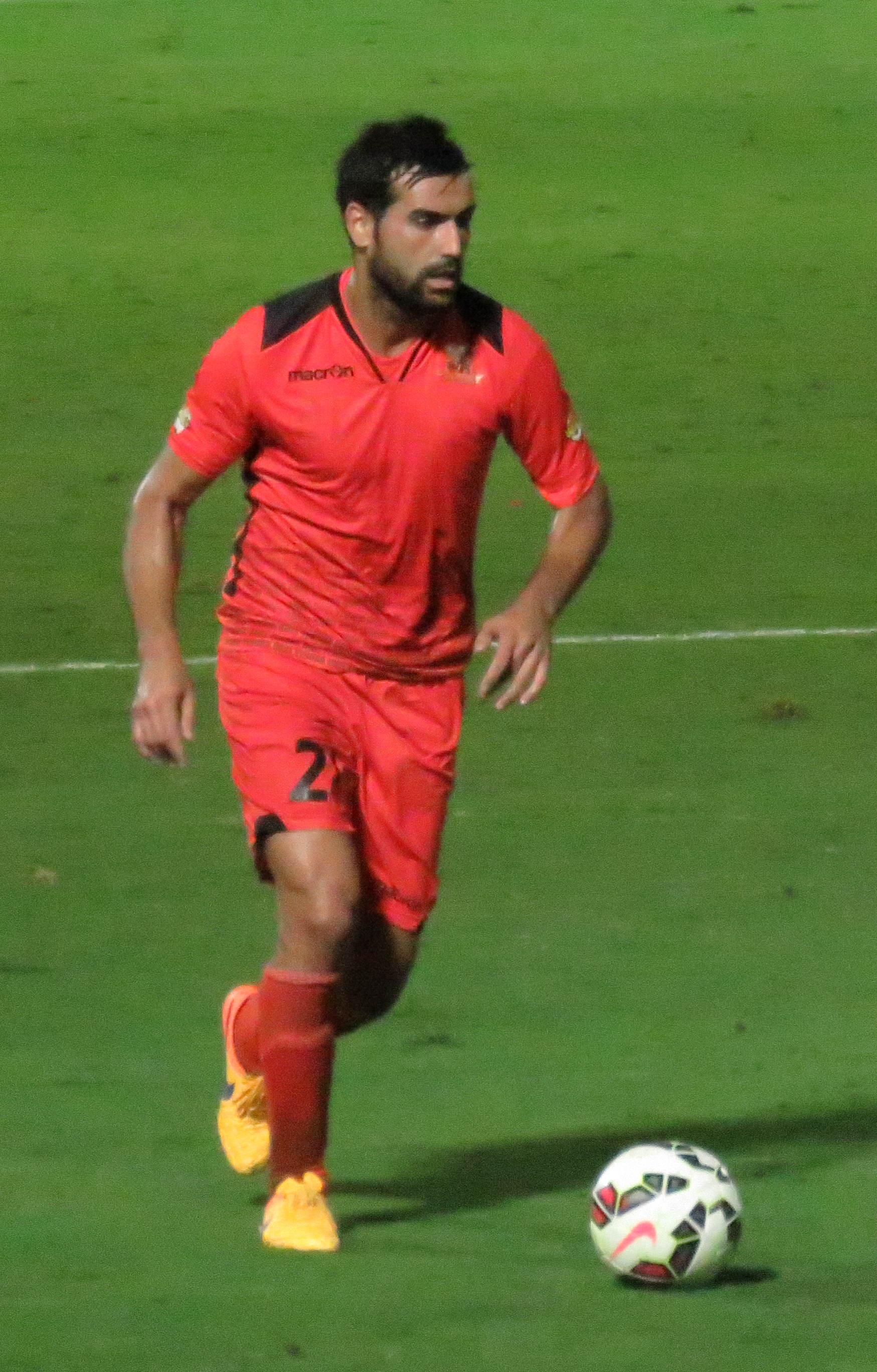
- Hadad playing for Bnei Yehuda in 2015

Personal information
- Full name: Aviv Hadad
- Date of birth: 4 February 1984 (age 42)
- Place of birth: Beit Aryeh-Ofarim, West Bank
- Position: Center back

Team information
- Current team: Hapoel Baqa al-Gharbiyye

Youth career
- Maccabi Tel Aviv

Senior career*
Years	Team	Apps	(Gls)
2003–2009	Maccabi Tel Aviv	1	(0)
2003–2004	→ Maccabi Kiryat Gat		
2004–2005	→ Ironi Ramat HaSharon		
2005–2007	→ Hapoel Ashkelon	62	(1)
2007–2009	→ Hakoah Amidar Ramat Gan	52	(0)
2009–2016	Bnei Yehuda Tel Aviv	167	(5)
2016	Hapoel Bnei Lod	13	(1)
2016–2017	Ironi Nesher	32	(1)
2017	Hakoah Amidar Ramat Gan	4	(0)
2017–2018	Hapoel Umm al-Fahm	23	(0)
2018	Hapoel Hod HaSharon	4	(0)
2018	Hapoel Shefa-'Amr	3	(0)
2018–2019	Hapoel Bnei Zalafa	17	(0)
2019	Shimshon Bnei Tayibe	9	(2)
2019–2020	Maccabi Kiryat Ata	22	(2)
2020–2021	Hapoel Baqa al-Gharbiyye	12	(3)
2021–2022	Elitzur Jaffa Tel Aviv	18	(1)
2022–2023	Roei Heshbon Tel Aviv	23	(6)
2023–	Maccabi Yehud-Monosson	3	(0)
- * Club domestic league appearances and goals as of 1 August 2023

Aviv Hadad (Hebrew: אביב חדד; born 4 February 1984) is an Israeli football player who is of a Tunisian-Jewish origin. He is currently playing for Maccabi Yehud-Monosson.

== Career ==
Hadad began his career in the youth team of Maccabi Tel Aviv. Between 2003 and 2007, Hadad was loaned to 3 different clubs: Maccabi Kiryat Gat, Ironi Ramat Hasharon and Hapoel Ashkelon. At the beginning of the 2007–08 season he returned to his boyhood club and Played three games in the Toto Cup, but was loaned to Hakoah Amidar Ramat Gan, which won the league and was promoted. The following season, still playing for Hakoah Amidar Ramat Gan, the club finished second-bottom and lost the relegation promotion and dropped back to the Liga Leumit.

At the beginning of the 2009–10 season Hadad was transferred to Bnei Yehuda Tel Aviv.

== Honours ==
- Liga Leumit
  - Winner (2): 2007–08, 2014–15
- Israel State Cup
  - Runner-up (2): 2007, 2010
- Toto Cup Leumit
  - Runner-up (2): 2007, 2014
