= 2007–08 Toto Cup Leumit =

Toto Cup Leumit
- Season: 2007–08
- Champions: Hapoel Petah Tikva

The 2007–08 Toto Cup Leumit was the 19th time the cup was being contested. The final was played at Haberfeld Stadium on 18 December 2007.

The winners were Hapoel Petah Tikva, beating Hakoah Amidar Ramat Gan 2–0 in the final.

== Group stage ==
=== Group A ===
Pos	Team	Pld	W	D	L	GF	GA	GD	Pts	HHA	HPT	HBL	HRA	HRL	MAN
1	Hapoel Haifa (A)	10	6	1	3	15	8	+7	19		0–1	3–0	1–3	1–0	3–1
2	Hapoel Petah Tikva (A)	10	5	2	3	13	9	+4	17	2–1		2–0	1–0	0–1	1–1
3	Hapoel Bnei Lod	10	4	2	4	10	14	−4	14	0–0	0–3		2–1	2–0	3–2
4	Hapoel Ra'anana	10	4	1	5	13	10	+3	13	0–1	2–0	1–2		1–1	2–0
5	Hapoel Rishon LeZion	10	3	2	5	6	10	−4	11	0–1	2–2	1–0	1–0		0–1
6	Maccabi Ahi Nazareth	10	3	2	5	12	18	−6	11	1–4	2–1	1–1	1–3	2–0	

Source: Toto Cup Leumit 2007/2008 IFA (in Hebrew)
Rules for classification: 1st points; 2nd goal difference; 3rd matches won; 4th goals scored; 5th head-to-head; 6th decision match
(A) Advanced to the semifinals

=== Group B ===
Pos	Team	Pld	W	D	L	GF	GA	GD	Pts	HBS	HAR	HNI	HRG	HRH	HAC
1	Hapoel Be'er Sheva (A)	10	7	2	1	18	2	+16	23		1–1	2–0	0–0	4–0	1–0
2	Hakoah Amidar Ramat Gan (A)	10	6	2	2	15	8	+7	20	0–2		4–1	3–0	2–0	1–0
3	Hapoel Nazareth Illit	10	5	0	5	13	17	−4	15	0–4	1–3		1–2	2–0	2–1
4	Hapoel Ramat Gan	10	3	2	5	10	14	−4	11	1–0	0–1	1–2		2–2	1–3
5	Hapoel Ramat HaSharon	10	3	1	6	10	22	−12	10	0–3	3–0	0–3	2–1		0–3
6	Hapoel Acre	10	2	1	7	9	12	−3	7	0–1	0–0	0–1	0–2	2–3	

Source: Toto Cup Leumit 2007/2008 (Group B) IFA (in Hebrew)
Rules for classification: 1st points; 2nd goal difference; 3rd matches won; 4th goals scored; 5th head-to-head; 6th decision match
(A) Advanced to the semifinals

=== Semifinals ===
4 December 2007
16:00

Hakoah Amidar Ramat Gan	2–2 (a.e.t.)	Hapoel Haifa
Eliyahu 65'; Rosh 91'	Report	Avrahami 81' Levy 105'
Penalties
Badash (penalty scored); Eliyahu (penalty scored); Unger (penalty scored); Elkayam (penalty scored)	4–1	(penalty missed) Janah; (penalty scored) Harush; (penalty missed) Kiwan

Ramat Gan Stadium
Referee: Rami Ben Itzhak

4 December 2007
18:50

Hapoel Be'er Sheva	1–2	Hapoel Petah Tikva
Simioni 81'	Report	Kimoto 20'; Nagar 90'

Ramat Gan Stadium
Referee: Asher Cohen

=== Final ===
18 December 2007
17:00

Hapoel Petah Tikva	2–0	Hakoah Amidar Ramat Gan
Luzon 24'; Kimoto 83'	Report

Haberfeld Stadium, Rishon LeZion
Referee: Eitan Shmuelevich

== See also ==
- Toto Cup
- 2007–08 Liga Leumit
- 2007–08 in Israeli football
