= Tomer Ben Yosef =

Israeli footballer

Tomer Ben Yosef תומר בן יוסף
Personal information
- Full name: Tomer Ben Yosef
- Date of birth: 2 September 1979 (age 47)
- Place of birth: Petah Tikva, Israel
- Height: 1.80 m (5 ft 11 in)
- Position: Defender

Youth career
- 1992–1995: Maccabi Petah Tikva

Senior career*
Years	Team	Apps	(Gls)
1995–2005	Maccabi Petah Tikva	200	(1)
2005–2012	Beitar Jerusalem	108	(4)
2012–2013	Hapoel Tel Aviv	0	(0)

International career^{‡}
2004–2007	Israel	7	(0)
- * Club domestic league appearances and goals as of 15 May 2010 ‡ National team caps and goals as of 17 July 2009

Tomer Ben Yosef (Hebrew: תומר בן יוסף; born September 2, 1979) is an Israeli football player who plays as a central defender.

He started playing for Maccabi Petah Tikva in the Youth level alongside team-mates such as Gal Alberman and Omer Golan.

In his 10 years in Petah Tikva, Tomer won the Toto Cup, reached 2nd place in the league and also the State Cup Final.

In 2005 Ben Yosef was transferred to Beitar Jerusalem. In 2006 the veteran Arik Benado moved to Beitar. Initially, there were doubts whether Ben Yosef would stay in Beitar but eventually he stayed and maintained a consistent fixed role in the squad.

In September 2012, Ben-Yosef signed at Hapoel Tel Aviv for one year, After being released from Beitar Jerusalem.

== Honours ==
- Israeli championships
  - 2006–07, 2007–08
- State Cup
  - 2008, 2009
- Toto Cup
  - 2003-04, 2009–10
