= Tomer Eliyahu =

Israeli footballer

Tomer Eliyahu תומר אליהו
Personal information
- Full name: Tomer Eliyahu
- Date of birth: 25 February 1975 (age 51)
- Place of birth: Bat Yam, Israel
- Positions: Defender; midfielder

Youth career
- 1982–1993: Hapoel Tel Aviv

Senior career*
Years	Team	Apps	(Gls)
1993–1998	Hapoel Tel Aviv	76	(3)
1998–2003	Ironi Rishon LeZion	151	(3)
1999–2000	→ Hapoel Kfar Saba	6	(0)
2003–2005	Bnei Sakhnin	57	(1)
2005–2006	Hapoel Acre	-	(-)
2006–2007	Hapoel Beersheba	29	(0)
2007–2008	Hakoah Amidar Ramat Gan	32	(0)
2012	Hapoel Bat Yam	5	(1)
- * Club domestic league appearances and goals

Tomer Eliyahu (Hebrew: תומר אליהו; born 25 February 1975) is a retired Israeli professional association football player. Known as a journeyman, Eliyahu played more than 350 matches in thirteen seasons in Israel's Ligat ha'Al filling in as both a defender and a midfielder.

== Biography ==
=== Early life ===
Eliyahu started playing football at age 7 with Hapoel Tel Aviv. He was brought up to Hapoel's first team by then manager, Moshe Sinai.

=== Professional career ===
After the 2001/02 season, Eliyahu signed a two-year contract worth US $110,000 per season.

=== Bnei Sakhnin ===
After Ironi Rishon LeZion was relegated to the Liga Leumit, Eliyahu signed a contract with Bnei Sakhnin. During the 2004/05 season, a small fight broke out after a 2-0 loss to Hapoel Tel Aviv. In the ensuing violence, the referee, Assaf Keinan was attacked and a police officer was stabbed. In an interview after the incident, Eliyahu became extremely vocal about an underlying anti-semitism toward Bnei Sakhnin by referees as the team was an Arab team. Eliyahu said that he had not experienced such disdain from match officials at any of his previous clubs. After two seasons with Bnei Sakhnin, Eliyahu attracted interest from Beitar Jerusalem but opted to sign with Hapoel Acre of the Liga Leumit.

=== Hakoah Amidar/Ramat Gan ===
After one full season in Ramat Gan, Eliyahu was forced to retire due to back problems.

== Honours ==
=== With Bnei Sakhnin ===
- State Cup: 2003/04

=== With Hapoel Acre ===
- Toto Cup (Leumit): 2005/06

=== With Hakoah Maccabi Amidar/Ramat Gan ===
- Liga Leumit: 2007/08

== Statistics ==
Club performance			League		Cup		League Cup		Continental		Total	
Season	Club	League	Apps	Goals	Apps	Goals	Apps	Goals	Apps	Goals	Apps	Goals
Israel			League		Israel State Cup		Toto Cup		Europe		Total	
2006-07	Hapoel Beersheba	Liga Leumit	29	0	1	0	9	0	0	0	39	0
2007-08	Hakoah Maccabi Amidar/Ramat Gan	Liga Leumit	31	0	2	0	8	4	0	0	41	4
2008-09	Hakoah Maccabi Amidar/Ramat Gan	Ligat ha'Al	1	0	0	0	0	0	0	0	1	0
Total	Israel											
Career total												
