= Haleva =

Haleva is a Hebrew surname. Notable people with the surname include:

- Ishak Haleva (1940–2025), Turkish rabbi
- Jerry Haleva (born 1945 or 1946), American actor

== See also ==
- Halavi
- Haliva
- Halevi
- Haliva
