= Israel Zviti =

Israeli footballer and scout

Israel Zviti ישראל זביטי
Personal information
- Full name: Israel Zviti
- Date of birth: January 15, 1980 (age 46)
- Place of birth: Netanya, Israel
- Height: 5 ft 11 in (1.80 m)
- Position: Midfielder

Team information
- Current team: Maccabi Netanya

Youth career
- 1992–1997: Maccabi Netanya

Senior career*
Years	Team	Apps	(Gls)
1997–2007	Maccabi Netanya	239	(10)
2007–2008	Hapoel Petah Tikva	21	(0)
2008–2009	Ironi Nir Ramat HaSharon	24	(0)
2009–2010	Hapoel Kfar Saba	7	(0)
2010–2011	Maccabi HaShikma Ramat Hen	25	(0)

International career
1994	Israel U16	4	(0)
1998–2001	Israel U21	13	(1)

Managerial career
- 2015–2016: Beitar Tubruk (assistant manager)
- 2016: Beitar Tubruk (U-15)
- 2017: Maccabi Netanya (U-16)
- * Club domestic league appearances and goals

Israel Zviti (Hebrew: ישראל זביטי; born 15 January 1980) is a retired Israeli footballer who now works as a scout for Maccabi Netanya.

== Honours ==
- Israeli Youth Championship:
  - Winner (1): 1994–95
- Youth State Cup:
  - Winner (1): 1996
- Israeli Second Division:
  - Winner (1): 1998-99
  - Runner-up (2): 2004–05, 2007–08
- Toto Cup (Leumit):
  - Winner (2): 2004–05, 2007–08
- Israeli Premier League:
  - Runner-up (1): 2006–07

== Club career statistics ==
(correct as of March 2011)

Club	Season	League			Cup			Toto Cup			Total		
Club	Season	Apps	Goals	Assists	Apps	Goals	Assists	Apps	Goals	Assists	Apps	Goals	Assists
Maccabi Netanya	1997–98	11	0	0	0	0	0	1	0	0	12	0	0
Maccabi Netanya	1998–99	21	2	2	0	0	0	2	0	0	23	2	2
Maccabi Netanya	1999–00	34	2	1	1	0	0	3	0	0	38	2	1
Maccabi Netanya	2000–01	34	0	2	0	0	0	0	0	0	34	0	2
Maccabi Netanya	2001–02	28	0	4	1	0	0	2	0	0	31	0	4
Maccabi Netanya	2002–03	24	3	2	1	0	0	7	0	0	32	3	2
Maccabi Netanya	2003–04	28	1	0	1	0	0	7	0	0	36	1	0
Maccabi Netanya	2004–05	30	1	7	1	0	0	5	1	1	36	2	8
Maccabi Netanya	2005–06	18	1	0	0	0	0	5	1	0	23	2	0
Maccabi Netanya	2006–07	11	0	0	1	0	0	7	0	0	19	0	0
Hapoel Petah Tikva	2007–08	21	0	0	1	0	0	10	0	0	31	0	0
Ironi Nir Ramat HaSharon	2008–09	24	0	0	1	0	0	3	1	0	28	1	0
Hapoel Kfar Saba	2009–10	7	0	1	0	0	0	2	0	0	9	0	1
Maccabi HaShikma Ramat Hen	2010–11	25	0	1	0	0	0	0	0	0	25	0	1
Career		313	10	20	8	0	0	54	3	1	375	13	21
