= Rômulo (footballer, born 1982) =

Brazilian footballer

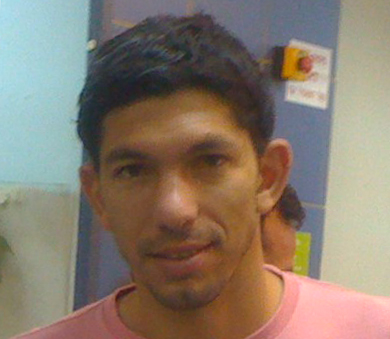
- Rômulo in 2008

Personal information
- Full name: Rômulo Marques Antoneli
- Date of birth: 25 February 1982 (age 44)
- Place of birth: Inhaúmas-GO, Brazil
- Height: 1.87 m (6 ft 2 in)
- Position: Forward

Youth career
- 2000–2001: Botafogo

Senior career*
Years	Team	Apps	(Gls)
2002–2003	Botafogo		
2003	Ituano		
2003	→ Comercial-SP (loan)		
2004–2005	Ituano	31	(17)
2005	→ Mainz 05 (loan)	8	(0)
2005–2006	→ Grêmio (loan)	26	(11)
2007	Cruzeiro	2	(2)
2007–2008	→ Beitar Jerusalem (loan)	31	(12)
2008–2010	Cruzeiro		
2009	→ Strasbourg (loan)	1	(0)
2009	→ Coritiba (loan)	5	(1)
2010	Atlas	3	(0)
2010	Guarani	8	(1)
2011	Grêmio Prudente		
2011	Brasiliense	6	(2)
2011	Westerlo	0	(0)
2011	Ironi Nir Ramat HaSharon	4	(0)
2012	Fortaleza		
2013	CRAC		
2013	Audax Rio		
2013	Valletta	3	(1)
2014	Trindade	11	(2)
2014	CRAC	3	(0)
- * Club domestic league appearances and goals

Rômulo Marques Antoneli (born 25 February 1982) is a Brazilian former professional footballer who played as a forward.

== Career ==
Rômulo was born in Inhaúmas-GO, Brazil.

After weeks of speculation, where it was thought that he might even go to Deportivo de La Coruña, Cruzeiro produced a bid twice as high as Grêmio's for the player. He did eventually move to Cruzeiro, but Cruzeiro later loaned him out to Beitar Jerusalem in August 2007 for one year. Rômulo joined the French Ligue 2 club RC Strasbourg on a six-month loan from Cruzeiro, on 8 September 2009 Coritiba signed the forward on loan from Cruzeiro until December 2009.

When the loan ended, he was transferred to Atlas of Mexico. After spending six months in Mexico, he returned to his home country Brazil and joined Guarani. Then, he moved to Grêmio Prudente from Guarani in January 2011. On 29 June 2011, Rômulo joined Belgian side Westerlo from Brasiliense, signing a one-year contract. But after just over two months at Belgium side, he moved to Israeli club Ironi Nir Ramat HaSharon. In July 2013, he joined Maltese club Valletta on a one-year deal.

== Honours ==
=== Club ===
- Goiás State League: 2002
- Brazilian League (3rd division): 2003
- Israeli Premier League: 2007–08
- Israel State Cup: 2007–08

=== Individual ===
- Goiás State League's top scorer: 2003
