= Renato Ribeiro =

Brazilian footballer

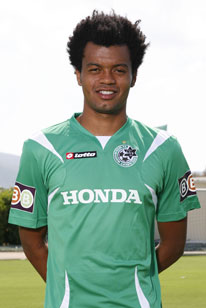

Personal information
- Full name: Renato Eduardo de Oliveira Ribeiro
- Date of birth: 28 April 1985 (age 41)
- Place of birth: Belo Horizonte, Brazil
- Height: 1.83 m (6 ft 0 in)
- Position: Attacking midfielder

Youth career
- 2002: Atlético Mineiro

Senior career*
Years	Team	Apps	(Gls)
2003–2005	Atlético Mineiro	48	(7)
2006	Corinthians	26	(3)
2007	Vasco da Gama	5	(0)
2007–2008	Maccabi Haifa	27	(7)
2009–2011	Cabofriense	0	(0)
2009	→ Botafogo (loan)	22	(5)
2010	→ Vitória (loan)	20	(0)
2011	→ Sport Recife (loan)	0	(0)
2011	→ Guarani (loan)	5	(0)
2012	Guarani	14	(2)
2013	Paulista	0	(0)
2013–2014	São Caetano	10	(1)
2014	Paulista		

International career
–2005	Brazil U20		
- * Club domestic league appearances and goals

Renato Eduardo de Oliveira Ribeiro (born 28 April 1985), known as Renato Ribeiro, is a Brazilian retired footballer who played as an attacking midfielder.

== Biography ==
Born in Belo Horizonte, Renato Ribeiro started his career at Atlético Mineiro. In 2006, he was signed by Corinthians, at that time associated with MSI. It was reported that MSI bought the rights of Renato. In January 2007 he joined Vasco. In summer 2007 he left for Israeli team Maccabi Haifa. In January 2009 Renato returned to Brazil, with Maccabi Haifa kept a percentage of economic rights on the player after terminating his contract which should last until 2010. He signed a 3-year contract with Cabofriense from Rio de Janeiro lower league, which acted as a proxy for the investor. He immediately left for Botafogo, also a club from Rio state. In 2010, he was signed by Esporte Clube Vitória.

On 8 January 2011 Renato Ribeiro moved to Sport Recife. In April 2011 he left for Guarani. He was released in February 2012 by Cabofriense and without a club until re-signed by Guarani in June 2012.
