= Shlomo Haliva =

Israeli convicted rapist and murderer (born 1949)

- שלמה חליוה
- Born: 1949 (age 76–77); Hadera, Israel
- Other name: "The Weeping Rapist"
- Convictions: Murder; Rape (7 counts)
- Penalty: Life imprisonment

Details
- Victims: Several attempted rapes (one conviction); 5 rapes (convicted); one rape and murder (convicted); suspicions in 2–10 rape-and-murder cases
- Span of crimes: 1969–1983
- Country: Israel
- States: Central (convicted); Haifa (suspected)
- Date apprehended: 1969 (suspended sentence); 1970 imprisoned for rape; main sentence 1991 for 1983 murder
- Imprisoned at: Shita Prison

Shlomo Haliva (Hebrew: שלמה חליוה; born 1949), known as The Weeping Rapist, is an Israeli serial rapist, murderer and suspected serial killer. While serving a rape sentence he was imprisoned for in 1976, Haliva was convicted for the murder of a woman in 1983, when he was sentenced to life imprisonment. He was released after 47 years in April 2024.

== Early life ==
Haliva was born in Hadera, four months after his parents had immigrated from Egypt. Shortly after his birth, the family moved to Acre. After completing 8 years of elementary school, he attended high school for two years, studying for a time at the Air Force Technical School before being drafted into the Israel Defense Forces at the age of 17, where he joined the Paratroopers Brigade.

== Sexual crimes ==
Haliva's first entanglement with the law was when he was a soldier in 1969, when he attempted to rape a Dutch tourist visiting Acre. He met her when he was on his way to his parents' house, and volunteered to give her a tour of the Old City. When they passed under an underground tunnel, he tried to carry out his plot but she managed to fend him off and escaped. At trial, he apologized. He was sentenced to pay a fine of IL100 and to two years probation.

In April 1969, after the trial had concluded, he was patrolling while carrying an Uzi, when he chanced upon a tourist who was waiting for a ride at the road junction in Atlit. Haliva introduced himself as a member of kibbutz Beit Oren and suggested that she go with him so that he could take a car left by his brother and travel to Tel Aviv together. When they reached the entrance, he attacked the woman in a field, wrapping his arm around her neck and raping her, traumatizing the woman, who later on would need psychiatric treatment. The newspapers later reported that after committing the rape, Haliva burst into tears, claiming that he had no idea what he had done. He then presented her his soldier's certificate, escorted the victim to a bus stop and left. From this incident, he was nicknamed "The Weeping Rapist."

Two months after his sentence, in August 1969, he met another tourist hitchhiking for a ride near a checkpoint in Haifa. They rode together to the workshops in the bay, where he attacked the woman and raped her while threatening with a gun. A few months later, she spotted him by accident while riding in a taxi, leading to his arrest.

While still on probation, he sexually assaulted another girl in Haifa in October 1969. He had met the girl on a dark street corner and raped her after asking her for directions. After some residents of the area were awoken by her scream, he fled the scene.

In November 1970, he was sentenced to 7 years imprisonment. The two years of probation imposed on him in June 1969 (following the attempted rape against the tourist) were added up in prison. On October 26, 1975, Haliva was released on parole and returned to his parents' home in Acre.

On February 2, 1976, he was arrested again on suspicion of committing five rapes after his release.

In November of that year, Haliva escaped from prison custody when he asked the guards to go to the bathroom, but was quickly recaptured in the village of Maccabiah. He was described by the guards as a "pleasant and educated guy."

In 1978, Haliva was convicted of five counts of rape and sentenced to 22 years imprisonment. He was nicknamed "The Weeping Rapist" because he would apologize to his victims after the act.

=== Murders of Leonor Ben Lulu and Irit Yaakovi ===
In 1976, when he was arrested on suspicion of rape, Haliva was questioned in regard to the rape-murders of two women, Leonor Ben Lulu and Irit Yaakovi.

Ben Lulu was 24 years old when she disappeared on January 23, 1976, while hitchhiking at the Arlozorov Junction (now Namir Road) in Tel Aviv on her way back home to Tiberias, where her family were celebrating her nephew's birthday. That Friday, employees of the Egged bus company were on strike, and there were no buses that travelled from Tel Aviv to Tiberias. On February 17, Ben Lulu's body was found in a eucalyptus grove near Netanya. She had been undressed, raped and then redressed, except for her shoes, which were left next to the body. Her killer had suffocated her to death with her own scarf and a hairbrush from her handbag, which he tightened around her neck. Her watch, ring and purse were missing from the crime scene.

Yaakovi, 23, disappeared on October 26, 1975, after leaving Haifa to travel to the Maagan Michael kibbutz where she lived. Her body was found on November 2 in an avocado orchard near the Maagan Michael Junction, naked and in a state of advanced decay, with severe skull fractures sustained after being raped.

Haliva confessed to killing Leonor Ben Lulu, with investigators claiming that he provided an accurate description of the body's location, but wrongfully claimed that he had buried it, which was untrue. The prosecution ruled that his confession was inadmissible, with Shlomo himself later claiming that he had confessed under duress. Ben Lulu's brother, a policeman at the time, said he thought it was him nonetheless.

=== Murder of Orly Dubi ===
Between November 13 and 16, 1983, Haliva was on prison leave, and during that period, a soldier named Orly Dubi disappeared on November 15. Her body was found in the Netanya area on December 14 in a state of advanced decomposition, naked and lying on her stomach. Her body had been discarded at a chromite processing plant belonging to the Ordan company. Dubi's personal belongings, most of her clothes, purse and identification were found scattered, some in the immediate vicinity and some in the water canal, on the other side of the road. Her bra and straps were tied in a knot around her neck, and from this, pathologists concluded that she had been strangled with it.

After finding the body, the police suspected Haliva might have been involved, and they questioned him about it. Although he was not considered a serious suspect, he uncharacteristically asked to visit his ailing father, which was denied, as it was a lie. He then asked again, this time accompanied by police officers, which was granted. While on the trip, Haliva managed to escape, but was recaptured a few days later in a yeshiva in Jerusalem. An examination of his clothes — a black leather jacket, a blue flannel shirt and jeans — revealed traces of chromite. Since this mineral's chemical properties were identical to those found on the victim's clothing, and the fact that it was unique to the Ordan company and could not be natural, researchers connected Haliva to the crime scene, using it as their primary evidence at trial. In prison interviews, Haliva sounded concerned about the clothes he was wearing and even tried to disrupt proceedings, apparently out of fear that witnesses would identify his clothing. Analysis of his semen determined that it matched that found on Dubi's body.

On October 31, 1991, Haliva was convicted by the District Court, composed of Justices Shulamit Wallenstein, Yaakov Kedmi and Edna Shatzky, of murder. He was sentenced to life imprisonment for the murder of Orly Dubi. According to the verdict, Haliva contacted Dubi while they were travelling together on a bus. Dubi, who was tired, had asked the driver to wake her when they reached Netanya, but the driver had forgotten to stop. Haliva shouted "Netanya, Netanya", disembarking with her and saying that he would escort her there. The puncture shape of the bus card found on Dubi was the same. However, the bus drivers misidentified both Haliva and Dubi, claiming that he was around 25 and short, and she was short and chubby, while Shlomo was 34 years old and tall, and Orly skinny and tall. Haliva himself claimed that he had an alibi, allegedly staying at his parents' home in Kiryat Yam on that night. The judges ruled that after leaving the local cinema, he had noticed Dubi getting off the bus, following and befriending her.

On October 17, 1995, his appeal to the Supreme Court was rejected unanimously in a ruling by Justices Eliyahu Matza, Yitzhak Zamir and Zvi Tal.

=== Coastal Highway murders ===
From the late 1960s to the mid-1980s, the bodies of at least ten young women were found along the Coastal Highway. Among them was that of soldier Rachel Heller, age 19, in 1974, whose body was found in the sand near the Sdot Yam kibbutz, and the body of British tourist Jacqueline Smith, age 24, whose body was found on May 26, 1972. At the time of these murders, Haliva worked as a milkman in prison, and he was periodically allowed prison leave. His files were destroyed, making it difficult to verify if he had been on leave from prison at the time of these murders, although there was some evidence, and it was even mentioned during one of the investigations that he had murdered the two women. Because there was no conclusive evidence, Haliva was never convicted, and another man, Amos Baranes, was even wrongfully convicted of Heller's murder. Baranes was imprisoned for eight and a half years before being released on a presidential pardon after a policeman concluded that he was innocent and the judge who had originally found him guilty reviewed the evidence and agreed. His conviction was overturned in 2002.

The murders were reminiscent in nature and cruelty to the murder of Orly Dubi, the only killing he has been convicted of, done while Shlomo was on prison leave. All victims had been strangled with clothing, their bodies were moved, a foreign object was inserted into the genitalia, they were stabbed with a sharp object and, in the murders of Heller and Smith, were mutilated with a peeler. A serial killer was suspected to be behind all the killings, but since the Israel Prison Service (IPS) could not give the exact dates of Haliva's prison leaves, it could not be determined if he was the culprit in the other murders.

In the second season of Shadow of Truth, airing on Hot, it was alleged that Haliva was the elusive "Coastal Highway Killer." The creators of the show complained that he threatened to harm them after they decided to visit him in prison. Following the second season of Shadow of Truth, the investigation files were reopened, but quickly led to dead ends, as they were not in-depth and lacked conclusive evidence.

=== Aftermath and release ===
Haliva never confessed or apologized for his actions, denying that he committed Dubi's killing, despite the fact that he revealed details only the killer would know. Also, prison informers have claimed he has bragged about numerous rapes and several murders.

After 47 years of imprisonment, Shlomo Haliva was released on April 19, 2024.

== See also ==
- Shomrat gang rape (Israel 1988)
