= Tomer Tayar =

Israeli footballer

Tomer Tayar תומר תאיר
Personal information
- Full name: Tomer Tayar
- Date of birth: January 15, 1983 (age 43)
- Place of birth: Netanya, Israel
- Position: Midfielder

Youth career
- Maccabi Netanya

Senior career*
| Years | Team | Apps | (Gls) |
| 2000–2004 | Maccabi Netanya | 19 | (0) |
| 2004–2005 | Hapoel Ra'anana | | |
| 2005 | Bnei Sakhnin | 2 | (0) |
| 2006–2007 | Ironi Kiryat Shmona | 41 | (9) |
| 2007–2008 | F.C. Ashdod | 4 | (0) |
| 2008–2009 | Hapoel Acre | 43 | (7) |
| 2009–2010 | Hapoel Ramat Gan | 18 | (1) |
| 2010–2011 | Hapoel Ramat HaSharon | 8 | (0) |

International career
| 2003 | Israel U21 | 1 | (0) |
- * Club domestic league appearances and goals

Tomer Tayar (Hebrew: תומר תאיר; born 15 January 1983) is a former Israeli footballer who played as a midfielder. He is of a Tunisian-Jewish descent, He played for several clubs in the Israeli leagues, including Maccabi Netanya, Ironi Kiryat Shmona, and Hapoel Acre. He also represented the Israel U21 national team in 2003.

== Honours ==
- Liga Leumit (1):
  - 2006-07
- Toto Cup (Leumit) (1):
  - 2006-07
