= Gal Alberman =

Israeli footballer (born 1983)

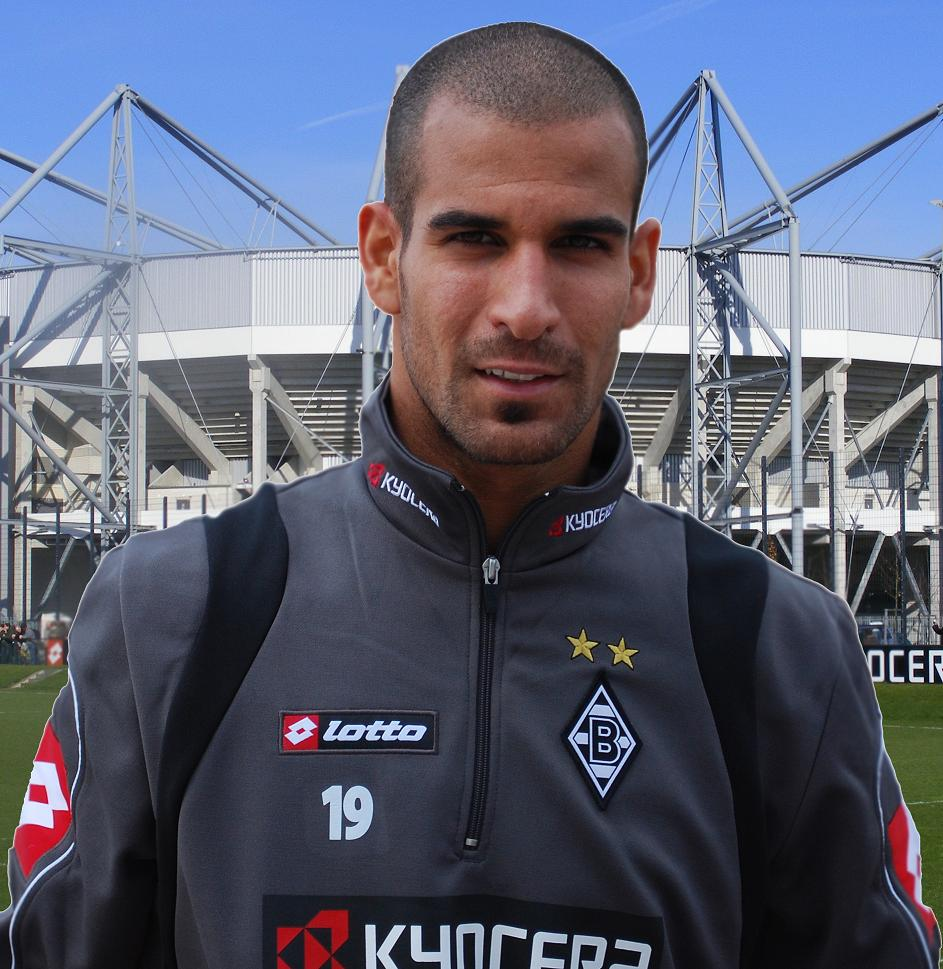
- Alberman with Borussia Mönchengladbach in 2008

Personal information
- Date of birth: 17 April 1983 (age 43)
- Place of birth: Oranit, Israel
- Height: 1.79 m (5 ft 10 in)
- Position: Defensive midfielder

Youth career
- Maccabi Petah Tikva

Senior career*
Years	Team	Apps	(Gls)
2000–2005	Maccabi Petah Tikva	90	(11)
2005	Tenerife	12	(0)
2006–2008	Beitar Jerusalem	66	(11)
2008–2010	Borussia Mönchengladbach	16	(0)
2010–2017	Maccabi Tel Aviv	216	(5)
2017–2019	Maccabi Haifa	29	(0)
Total		429	(27)

International career
1999	Israel U16	2	(0)
2001	Israel U19	6	(0)
2003–2005	Israel U21	12	(2)
2002–2015	Israel	36	(1)

Managerial career
- 2019–2020: Maccabi Haifa (assistant)
- 2021–: Maccabi Haifa (general manager)
- * Club domestic league appearances and goals

Gal Alberman (Hebrew: גל אלברמן; born 17 April 1983) is an Israeli former professional footballer who played as a defensive midfielder.

== Club career ==
=== Maccabi Petah Tikva ===
Alberman was born in Oranit, Israel, to a Jewish family. Alberman started playing for Maccabi Petah Tikva in the youth levels. He playing alongside Tomer Ben-Yosef and Omer Golan, among others. In his five years in Petah Tikva, he won the Toto Cup, reached second place in the premier league and also the State Cup final.

=== Tenerife, Beitar Jerusalem, Borussia Mönchengladbach ===
In July 2005, he was transferred to CD Tenerife in Spain's Segunda División. In January 2006, however, he returned to Israel, teaming up with Beitar Jerusalem.

In the end of season 2007–08 Alberman was chosen for the best player of the season.

Alberman was transferred on 2 June 2008 on a four-year deal to Borussia Mönchengladbach, who had just gained promotion from the 2. Bundesliga.

=== Maccabi Tel-Aviv ===
On 31 August 2010, he was purchased by Maccabi Tel Aviv after a long-term negotiation. He finished his first season in Tel Aviv with 30 appearances and one goal in the last match of the season. In the 2011–12 season with the arrival of new coach Nir Levine, he started playing more frequently and eventually was appointed as the new captain. On 13 May 2012, his contract was extended for two more years.

In the 2012–13 season, he had 34 appearances in the league. During this season he was the vice captain after Sheran Yeini was appointed. At the end of the season, he won his first championship with Maccabi. The next season, Alberman won his second championship. On 19 May 2014, he extended his contract for two more years. In the 2014–15 season, he won with Maccabi their first ever domestic treble after winning the Israeli Premier League, the Israeli State Cup and the Toto Cup.

On 25 August 2015, he qualified with Maccabi to the Champions League group stage after passing FC Basel in the playoffs.

In June 2017, Alberman left Maccabi Tel Aviv and signed for Maccabi Haifa.

On 6 June 2019, Alberman announced his retirement at the age of 36.

== International career ==
On 20 November 2002, Alberman made his debut in the national team in a friendly match against Macedonia. On 17 October 2007, he scored his first goal for the team during a friendly match against Belarus. After not being included in the squad since 2010 FIFA World Cup qualification, he was called up for the 2014 FIFA World Cup qualification and eventually participated in five matches.

Alberman announced on 27 August 2015 that he had retired from international football.

== Career statistics ==
Scores and results list Israel's goal tally first, score column indicates score after each Alberman goal.

List of international goals scored by Gal Alberman
No.	Date	Venue	Opponent	Score	Result	Competition
1	17 October 2007	Ramat Gan Stadium, Ramat Gan, Israel	Belarus	2–1	2–1	Friendly

== Honours ==
Maccabi Petah Tikva

- Toto Cup Top Division: 2003–04

Beitar Jerusalem

- Israeli Premier League: 2006–07, 2007–08
- Israel State Cup: 2007–08

Maccabi Tel Aviv

- Israeli Premier League: 2012–13, 2013–14, 2014–15
- Toto Cup Top Division: 2014–15
- Israel State Cup: 2014–15

Individual

- Footballer of the Year in Israel: 2008
