= Tomer Haliva =

Israeli footballer

Tomer Haliva תומר חליבה
Personal information
- Full name: Tomer Haliva
- Date of birth: September 27, 1979 (age 47)
- Place of birth: Beersheba, Israel
- Height: 1.80 m (5 ft 11 in)
- Position: Right back

Youth career
- Hapoel Be'er Sheva

Senior career*
Years	Team	Apps	(Gls)
1998–2001	Hapoel Be'er Sheva		
2001–2002	Hapoel Mashos-Segev Shalom		
2002	Hapoel Tzafririm Holon		
2002–2005	Hapoel Be'er Sheva	73	(5)
2005–2006	Beitar Jerusalem	23	(1)
2006–2007	Hapoel Tel Aviv	9	(0)
2007	F.C. Ashdod	8	(1)
2007	Hapoel Ironi Kiryat Shmona	0	(0)
2008	Hapoel Be'er Sheva	12	(0)
2008	Hapoel Bnei Lod	14	(0)
2009	Hakoah Maccabi Amidar Ramat Gan	4	(0)
2009–2010	Maccabi Be'er Sheva	34	(0)

International career^{‡}
2004	Israel	2	(0)
- * Club domestic league appearances and goals as of 27 November 2009 ‡ National team caps and goals as of 27 November 2009

Tomer Haliva (Hebrew: תומר חליבה; born September 27, 1979) is an Israeli football full back playing for Maccabi Be'er Sheva.

Haliva began his career as a defender for Hapoel Be'er Sheva youth team, and in 1997-1998 season he moved to the first team of the club. He played for Be'er Sheva sporadically until 2004–2005, moving to other lower league clubs the likes of Hapoel Tzafririm Holon (national league at the time) and Hapoel Mashosh-Segev Shalom (Liga Bet).

In 2005-2006 Haliva transferred to Beitar Jerusalem and a year later he moved to Hapoel Tel Aviv and signed a 3 years-contract, but on January he transferred to F.C. Ashdod.
