= 2007–08 Israeli Premier League =

Israeli Premier League
- Season: 2007–08
- Champions: Beitar Jerusalem; 2nd Premier League title 6th top-flight title
- Relegated: Hakoah Amidar Ramat Gan and Hapoel Petah Tikva
- Champions League: Beitar Jerusalem (second qualifying round)
- Europa Cup: Hapoel Tel Aviv (group stage); Maccabi Netanya (second qualifying round); Maccabi Tel Aviv (second qualifying round)
- Goals scored: 459
- Average goals/game: 2.318
- Top goalscorer: (Ghana) Samuel Yeboah (15)
- Biggest home win: Beitar Jerusalem 5-0 F.C. Ashdod (7 October 2007)
- Biggest away win: F.C. Ashdod 1-6 Maccabi Netanya (29 September 2007)
- Highest scoring: F.C. Ashdod 1-6 Maccabi Netanya (29 September 2007)
- Longest unbeaten run: Beitar Jerusalem (16 games)

The 2007–08 Israeli Premier League season began on 18 August 2007 and ended on 1 June 2008, with Beitar Jerusalem win their second consecutive title.

Two teams from Liga Leumit were promoted at the end of the previous season: Ironi Kiryat Shmona and Bnei Sakhnin. The two teams relegated were Hakoah Amidar Ramat Gan and Hapoel Petah Tikva.

== Teams and Locations ==
Locations of the 2007–08 Israeli Premier League teams

Twelve teams took part in the 2007-08 Israeli Premier League season, including ten teams from the 2006-07 season, as well as two teams which were promoted from the 2006-07 Liga Leumit.

Ironi Kiryat Shmona were promoted as champions of the 2006-07 Liga Leumit. Bnei Sakhnin were promoted as runners up. Bnei Sakhnin returned after an absence of one season, while Ironi Kiryat Shmona made their debut in the top flight.

Hakoah Amidar Ramat Gan and Hapoel Petah Tikva were relegated after finishing in the bottom two places in the 2006-07 season.

Club	Stadium	Capacity
Beitar Jerusalem	Teddy Stadium	21,600
Bnei Yehuda	Bloomfield Stadium	15,700
Hapoel Tel Aviv	Bloomfield Stadium	15,700
Maccabi Tel Aviv	Bloomfield Stadium	15,700
Maccabi Haifa	Kiryat Eliezer Stadium	14,002
Maccabi Herzliya	Herzliya Municipal Stadium	8,100
F.C. Ashdod	Yud-Alef Stadium	7,800
Maccabi Netanya	Sar-Tov Stadium	7,500
Maccabi Petah Tikva	Petah Tikva Municipal Stadium	6,800
Hapoel Kfar Saba	Levita Stadium	5,800
Ironi Kiryat Shmona	Kiryat Shmona Municipal Stadium	5,300
Bnei Sakhnin	Doha Stadium	5,000

Beitar Jerusalem	Bnei Yehuda Hapoel Tel Aviv Maccabi Tel Aviv	Hapoel Kfar Saba	Maccabi Herzliya
Teddy Stadium	Bloomfield Stadium	Levita Stadium	Herzliya Municipal Stadium
Maccabi Netanya	Maccabi Haifa	Maccabi Petah Tikva	
Sar-Tov Stadium	Kiryat Eliezer Stadium	Petah Tikva Municipal Stadium	
F.C. Ashdod	Bnei Sakhnin	Ironi Kiryat Shmona	
Yud-Alef Stadium	Doha Stadium	Kiryat Shmona Stadium	

== League table ==
Pos	Team	Pld	W	D	L	GF	GA	GD	Pts	Qualification or relegation
1	Beitar Jerusalem (C)	33	20	7	6	61	23	+38	67	Qualification for the Champions League second qualifying round
2	Maccabi Netanya	33	16	10	7	40	24	+16	58	Qualification for the UEFA Cup second qualifying round
3	Ironi Kiryat Shmona	33	15	11	7	43	34	+9	56	Qualification for the UEFA Cup first qualifying round
4	Bnei Sakhnin	33	15	10	8	35	29	+6	55	Qualification for the Intertoto Cup second round
5	Maccabi Haifa	33	13	8	12	38	27	+11	47	
6	Maccabi Tel Aviv	33	11	8	14	43	43	0	41	
7	Hapoel Tel Aviv	33	12	5	16	35	40	−5	41	Qualification for the UEFA Cup first qualifying round (Note: Since Beitar Jerusalem won both Israeli State Cup and the Israeli Premier League championship, then the cup-runner-up, Hapoel Tel Aviv, awarded with entry to the 2008–09 UEFA Cup.)
8	F.C. Ashdod	33	11	6	16	36	52	−16	39	
9	Bnei Yehuda	33	11	5	17	31	43	−12	38	
10	Maccabi Petah Tikva	33	10	7	16	28	39	−11	37	
11	Hapoel Kfar Saba (R)	33	9	10	14	37	54	−17	37	Relegation to Liga Leumit
12	Maccabi Herzliya (R)	33	7	9	17	32	51	−19	30	Relegation to Liga Leumit

Source: The Israel Football Association
Rules for classification: 1) points; 2) goal difference; 3) number of goals scored.
(C) Champions; (R) Relegated

== Results ==
The schedule consisted of three rounds. During first two rounds, each team played each other once home and away for a total of 22 matches. The pairings of the third round were then set according to the standings after first two rounds, giving every team a third game against each opponent for a total of 33 games per team.

=== First and second round ===
Home \ Away	BEI	BnS	BnY	ASH	HKS	HTA	IKS	MHA	MHE	MNE	MPT	MTA
Beitar Jerusalem	—	0–1	3–0	5–0	4–0	1–0	0–0	1–0	4–2	2–0	2–1	2–0
Bnei Sakhnin	2–2	—	0–0	3–0	1–1	1–0	0–0	1–1	0–3	0–0	1–0	3–2
Bnei Yehuda	0–3	3–0	—	3–2	0–2	1–1	1–1	0–3	0–1	1–2	0–1	0–4
F.C. Ashdod	1–2	3–1	3–0	—	2–4	1–1	0–0	1–0	0–1	1–6	1–3	0–0
Hapoel Kfar Saba	1–1	0–0	0–0	3–1	—	1–1	2–3	0–3	2–3	1–2	0–0	0–3
Hapoel Tel Aviv	1–2	0–1	1–0	0–2	1–2	—	0–1	2–0	0–2	0–1	2–1	1–0
Ironi Kiryat Shmona	0–3	0–0	2–1	2–1	2–2	2–1	—	1–1	3–0	0–0	2–1	1–0
Maccabi Haifa	0–0	0–1	1–0	3–0	2–1	2–0	1–0	—	1–1	0–2	0–1	3–1
Maccabi Herzliya	1–1	0–1	0–2	1–1	0–0	2–3	1–3	0–1	—	1–2	1–1	1–3
Maccabi Netanya	0–1	1–2	0–0	3–0	2–3	0–0	0–0	2–1	0–0	—	1–0	1–0
Maccabi Petah Tikva	1–2	2–0	1–0	0–0	0–1	2–1	3–1	1–1	1–1	0–0	—	3–2
Maccabi Tel Aviv	0–0	0–0	3–1	1–1	0–1	1–3	2–2	0–3	2–0	0–2	2–1	—

Source: Israel Football Association
Legend: Blue = home team win; Yellow = draw; Red = away team win.

=== Third round ===
Home \ Away	BEI	BnS	BnY	ASH	HKS	HTA	IKS	MHA	MHE	MNE	MPT	MTA
Beitar Jerusalem	—	1–2	0–1	—	—	—	—	—	3–1	3–0	4–0	1–1
Bnei Sakhnin	—	—	1–3	1–2	2–0	0–1	—	1–0	—	1–1	—	—
Bnei Yehuda	—	—	—	2–0	3–0	2–3	—	—	2–0	—	—	0–1
F.C. Ashdod	1–0	—	—	—	3–1	2–1	2–0	2–0	—	—	—	—
Hapoel Kfar Saba	0–4	—	—	—	—	—	1–3	1–0	3–3	—	—	2–3
Hapoel Tel Aviv	3–1	—	—	—	0–1	—	2–0	1–1	2–1	—	—	—
Ironi Kiryat Shmona	3–2	0–1	2–0	—	—	—	—	—	2–2	—	1–0	3–1
Maccabi Haifa	0–1	—	0–1	—	—	—	2–1	—	3–0	—	0–0	3–3
Maccabi Herzliya	—	0–2	—	2–0	—	—	—	—	—	0–2	0–1	1–0
Maccabi Netanya	—	—	3–2	1–0	1–1	3–0	1–2	0–2	—	—	—	—
Maccabi Petah Tikva	—	0–4	0–1	0–3	1–0	1–2	—	—	—	0–1	—	—
Maccabi Tel Aviv	—	3–1	—	2–0	—	2–1	—	—	—	0–0	2–1	—

Source: Israel Football Association
Legend: Blue = home team win; Yellow = draw; Red = away team win.

== Goals ==
=== Top Goalscorers ===
Rank	Player	Club	Goals
1	(Ghana) Samuel Yeboah	Hapoel Kfar Saba	15
2	(Brazil) Rômulo	Beitar Jerusalem	12
2	(France) Yannick Kamanan	Maccabi Tel Aviv	12
2	(Israel) Moshe Biton	Bnei Yehuda	12
5	(Bulgaria) Dimitar Makriev	F.C. Ashdod	11
6	(Nigeria) Yero Bello	Ironi Kiryat Shmona	10
6	(Armenia) Yeghia Yavruyan	Bnei Sakhnin	10
8	(Israel) Yossi Shivhon	Maccabi Tel Aviv	9
8	(Israel) Maor Buzaglo	Bnei Sakhnin	9
8	(Israel) Yuval Avidor	Ironi Kiryat Shmona	9

Source: The Israel Football Association

== IFPA Leading Players of Season 2007–08 ==
=== Best Player of the Year ===
- (Israel) Gal Alberman - Beitar Jerusalem

=== Best Foreign Player of the Year ===
- (Ghana) Derek Boateng - Beitar Jerusalem

=== Best Manager of the Year ===
- (Israel) Itzhak Shum - Beitar Jerusalem

=== Discovery of the Year ===
- (Israel) Maor Buzaglo - Bnei Sakhnin

=== Best Goalkeeper of the Year ===
- (Israel) Liran Strauber - Maccabi Netanya

=== Best Defender of the Year ===
- (Israel) Arik Benado - Beitar Jerusalem

== See also ==
- List of Israeli football transfers 2007-08
- 2007–08 Toto Cup Al
