= 2007–08 Liga Leumit =

Israeli football season

The 2007–08 Liga Leumit season began on 17 August 2007 and ended on 24 May 2008. Hakoah Amidar Ramat Gan won the title and were promoted to the Premier League alongside runners-up Hapoel Petah Tikva. Ironi Rishon LeZion and Hapoel Nazareth Illit were relegated to Liga Artzit

== Final table ==
Pos	Team	Pld	W	D	L	GF	GA	GD	Pts	Promotion or relegation
1	Hakoah Amidar Ramat Gan	33	16	9	8	41	30	+11	57	Promoted to Premier League
2	Hapoel Petah Tikva	33	16	6	11	40	27	+13	54	Promoted to Premier League
3	Hapoel Haifa	33	15	7	11	36	29	+7	52	
4	Hapoel Be'er Sheva	33	14	9	10	31	18	+13	51	
5	Hapoel Bnei Lod	33	14	7	12	41	42	−1	49	
6	Hapoel Ramat Gan	33	13	9	11	33	38	−5	48	
7	Hapoel Ra'anana	33	11	13	9	34	31	+3	46	
8	Ironi Ramat HaSharon	33	11	10	12	33	37	−4	43	
9	Maccabi Ahi Nazareth	33	10	11	12	37	39	−2	41	
10	Hapoel Acre	33	9	10	14	29	32	−3	37	
11	Ironi Rishon LeZion	33	7	16	10	31	38	−7	37	Relegated to Liga Artzit
12	Hapoel Nazareth Illit	33	5	7	21	28	53	−25	22	Relegated to Liga Artzit

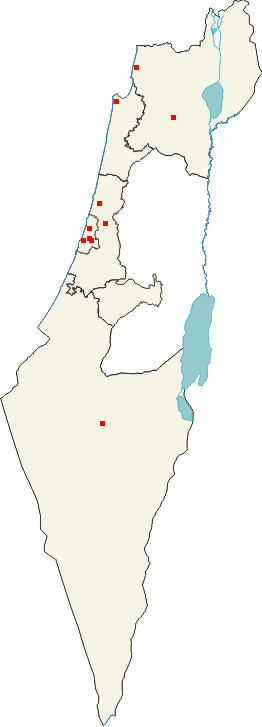

== Results ==
=== First round ===
Home team	Score	Away team
Round 1
Hapoel Be'er Sheva	0–1	Hapoel Ra'anana
Hakoah Amidar Ramat Gan	1–0	Hapoel Bnei Lod
Hapoel Acre	1–1	Hapoel Nazareth Illit
Maccabi Ahi Nazareth	1–1	Hapoel Haifa
Ironi Rishon LeZion	1–1	Hapoel Ramat Gan
Ironi Ramat HaSharon	1–1	Hapoel Petah Tikva
Round 2
Hapoel Ra'anana	2–0	Hapoel Petah Tikva
Hapoel Ramat Gan	1–0	Ironi Ramat HaSharon
Hapoel Haifa	2–1	Ironi Rishon LeZion
Hapoel Nazareth Illit	0–2	Maccabi Ahi Nazareth
Hapoel Bnei Lod	2–0	Hapoel Acre
Hapoel Be'er Sheva	3–0	Hakoah Amidar Ramat Gan
Round 3
Hakoah Amidar Ramat Gan	1–1	Hapoel Ra'anana
Hapoel Acre	1–0	Hapoel Be'er Sheva
Maccabi Ahi Nazareth	1–3	Hapoel Bnei Lod
Ironi Rishon LeZion	2–1	Hapoel Nazareth Illit
Ironi Ramat HaSharon	0–1	Hapoel Haifa
Hapoel Petah Tikva	2–1	Hapoel Ramat Gan
Round 4
Hapoel Bnei Lod	3–0	Ironi Rishon LeZion
Hapoel Be'er Sheva	1–0	Maccabi Ahi Nazareth
Hakoah Amidar Ramat Gan	3–1	Hapoel Acre
Hapoel Ra'anana	0–0	Hapoel Ramat Gan
Hapoel Haifa	0–0	Hapoel Petah Tikva
Hapoel Nazareth Illit	1–0	Ironi Ramat HaSharon
Round 5
Hapoel Acre	0–1	Hapoel Ra'anana
Maccabi Ahi Nazareth	4–0	Hakoah Amidar Ramat Gan
Ironi Rishon LeZion	2–0	Hapoel Be'er Sheva
Ironi Ramat HaSharon	2–5	Hapoel Bnei Lod
Hapoel Petah Tikva	3–2	Hapoel Nazareth Illit
Hapoel Ramat Gan	2–1	Hapoel Haifa
Round 6
Hapoel Be'er Sheva	2–0	Ironi Ramat HaSharon
Hakoah Amidar Ramat Gan	2–0	Ironi Rishon LeZion
Hapoel Acre	0–0	Maccabi Ahi Nazareth
Hapoel Ra'anana	2–2	Hapoel Haifa
Hapoel Nazareth Illit	1–1	Hapoel Ramat Gan
Hapoel Bnei Lod	0–2	Hapoel Petah Tikva
Round 7
Maccabi Ahi Nazaret	1–0	Hapoel Ra'anana
Ironi Rishon LeZion	2–1	Hapoel Acre
Ironi Ramat HaSharon	2–1	Hakoah Amidar Ramat Gan
Hapoel Petah Tikva	1–1	Hapoel Be'er Sheva
Hapoel Ramat Gan	0–3	Hapoel Bnei Lod
Hapoel Haifa	3–1	Hapoel Nazareth Illit
Round 8
Hapoel Ra'anana	1–1	Hapoel Nazareth Illit
Hapoel Bnei Lod	1–0	Hapoel Haifa
Hapoel Be'er Sheva	4–0	Hapoel Ramat Gan
Hakoah Amidar Ramat Gan	1–0	Hapoel Petah Tikva
Hapoel Acre	0–3	Ironi Ramat HaSharon
Maccabi Ahi Nazareth	2–2	Ironi Rishon LeZion
Round 9
Ironi Rishon LeZion	0–0	Hapoel Ra'anana
Ironi Ramat HaSharon	0–0	Maccabi Ahi Nazareth
Hapoel Petah Tikva	3–0	Hapoel Acre
Hapoel Ramat Gan	0–0	Hakoah Amidar Ramat Gan
Hapoel Haifa	1–0	Hapoel Be'er Sheva
Hapoel Nazareth Illit	1–1	Hapoel Bnei Lod
Round 10
Hapoel Ra'anana	1–2	Hapoel Bnei Lod
Hapoel Be'er Sheva	1–2	Hapoel Nazareth Illit
Hakoah Amidar Ramat Gan	2–1	Hapoel Haifa
Hapoel Acre	3–0	Hapoel Ramat Gan
Maccabi Ahi Nazareth	1–3	Hapoel Petah Tikva
Hapoel Acre	0–0	Ironi Ramat HaSharon
Round 11
Ironi Ramat HaSharon	0–1	Hapoel Ra'anana
Hapoel Petah Tikva	3–0	Ironi Rishon LeZion
Hapoel Ramat Gan	1–2	Maccabi Ahi Nazareth
Hapoel Haifa	1–0	Hapoel Acre
Hapoel Nazareth Illit	0–1	Hakoah Amidar Ramat Gan
Hapoel Bnei Lod	0–1	Hapoel Be'er Sheva

=== Second round ===
Home team	Score	Away team
Round 12
Hapoel Ra'anana	1–0	Hapoel Be'er Sheva
Hapoel Bnei Lod	1–3	Hakoah Amidar Ramat Gan
Hapoel Nazareth Illit	0–2	Hapoel Acre
Hapoel Haifa	0–0	Maccabi Ahi Nazareth
Hapoel Ramat Gan	0–0	Ironi Rishon LeZion
Hapoel Petah Tikva	0–1	Ironi Ramat HaSharon
Round 13
Maccabi Ahi Nazareth	0–0	Hapoel Nazareth Illit
Hapoel Acre	3–0	Hapoel Bnei Lod
Hakoah Amidar Ramat Gan	0–2	Hapoel Be'er Sheva
Hapoel Petah Tikva	3–0	Hapoel Ra'anana
Ironi Ramat HaSharon	1–1	Hapoel Ramat Gan
Ironi Rishon LeZion	1–0	Hapoel Haifa
Round 14
Hapoel Nazareth Illit	3–2	Ironi Rishon LeZion
Hapoel Haifa	0–3	Ironi Ramat HaSharon
Hapoel Ramat Gan	1–2	Hapoel Petah Tikva
Hapoel Ra'anana	1–2	Hakoah Amidar Ramat Gan
Hapoel Be'er Sheva	0–0	Hapoel Acre
Hapoel Bnei Lod	4–0	Maccabi Ahi Nazareth
Round 15
Ironi Rishon LeZion	0–0	Hapoel Bnei Lod
Maccabi Ahi Nazareth	0–2	Hapoel Be'er Sheva
Hapoel Acre	0–1	Hakoah Amidar Ramat Gan
Hapoel Ramat Gan	1–0	Hapoel Ra'anana
Hapoel Petah Tikva	0–2	Hapoel Haifa
Ironi Ramat HaSharon	1–0	Hapoel Nazareth Illit
Round 16
Hapoel Ra'anana	0–0	Hapoel Acre
Hakoah Amidar Ramat Gan	1–0	Maccabi Ahi Nazareth
Hapoel Be'er Sheva	1–1	Ironi Rishon LeZion
Hapoel Bnei Lod	0–3	Ironi Ramat HaSharon
Hapoel Nazareth Illit	1–0	Hapoel Petah Tikva
Hapoel Haifa	1–2	Hapoel Ramat Gan
Round 17
Hapoel Haifa	2–1	Hapoel Ra'anana
Hapoel Ramat Gan	1–0	Hapoel Nazareth Illit
Hapoel Petah Tikva	2–1	Hapoel Bnei Lod
Ironi Ramat HaSharon	1–1	Hapoel Be'er Sheva
Ironi Rishon LeZion	1–1	Hakoah Amidar Ramat Gan
Maccabi Ahi Nazareth	1–1	Hapoel Acre
Round 18
Hapoel Be'er Sheva	0–1	Hapoel Petah Tikva
Hapoel Bnei Lod	2–0	Hapoel Ramat Gan
Hapoel Nazareth Illit	1–1	Hapoel Haifa
Hapoel Ra'anana	1–0	Maccabi Ahi Nazaret
Hapoel Acre	2–2	Ironi Rishon LeZion
Hakoah Amidar Ramat Gan	0–0	Ironi Ramat HaSharon
Round 19
Hapoel Petah Tikva	0–0	Hakoah Amidar Ramat Gan
Ironi Ramat HaSharon	0–1	Hapoel Acre
Ironi Rishon LeZion	1–1	Maccabi Ahi Nazareth
Hapoel Nazareth Illit	0–1	Hapoel Ra'anana
Hapoel Haifa	0–1	Hapoel Bnei Lod
Hapoel Ramat Gan	1–0	Hapoel Be'er Sheva
Round 20
Hapoel Ra'anana	2–0	Ironi Rishon LeZion
Maccabi Ahi Nazareth	2–1	Ironi Ramat HaSharon
Hapoel Acre	0–1	Hapoel Petah Tikva
Hakoah Amidar Ramat Gan	0–1	Hapoel Ramat Gan
Hapoel Be'er Sheva	0–1	Hapoel Haifa
Hapoel Bnei Lod	2–1	Hapoel Nazareth Illit
Round 21
Hapoel Bnei Lod	1–1	Hapoel Ra'anana
Hapoel Nazareth Illit	1–2	Hapoel Be'er Sheva
Hapoel Haifa	0–0	Hakoah Amidar Ramat Gan
Hapoel Ramat Gan	2–1	Hapoel Acre
Hapoel Petah Tikva	2–2	Maccabi Ahi Nazareth
Ironi Ramat HaSharon	0–0	Hapoel Acre
Round 22
Hapoel Ra'anana	1–2	Ironi Ramat HaSharon
Ironi Rishon LeZion	0–2	Hapoel Petah Tikva
Maccabi Ahi Nazareth	2–1	Hapoel Ramat Gan
Hapoel Acre	1–0	Hapoel Haifa
Hakoah Amidar Ramat Gan	2–1	Hapoel Nazareth Illit
Hapoel Be'er Sheva	1–1	Hapoel Bnei Lod

=== Third round ===
Home team	Score	Away team
Round 23
Hapoel Ra'anana	0–1	Hapoel Nazareth Illit
Hapoel Ramat Gan	1–3	Hakoah Amidar Ramat Gan
Maccabi Ahi Nazareth	1–2	Hapoel Petah Tikva
Hapoel Haifa	1–0	Hapoel Acre
Hapoel Bnei Lod	3–0	Ironi Ramat HaSharon
Hapoel Be'er Sheva	1–0	Ironi Rishon LeZion
Round 24
Hapoel Nazareth Illit	3–2	Ironi Rishon LeZion
Ironi Ramat HaSharon	0–0	Hapoel Be'er Sheva
Hapoel Acre	0–0	Hapoel Bnei Lod
Hapoel Petah Tikva	0–2	Hapoel Haifa
Hakoah Amidar Ramat Gan	1–0	Maccabi Ahi Nazareth
Hapoel Ra'anana	0–0	Hapoel Ramat Gan
Round 25
Hapoel Ramat Gan	3–1	Hapoel Nazareth Illit
Maccabi Ahi Nazareth	2–4	Hapoel Ra'anana
Hapoel Haifa	1–1	Hakoah Amidar Ramat Gan
Hapoel Bnei Lod	2–1	Hapoel Petah Tikva
Hapoel Be'er Sheva	0–0	Hapoel Acre
Ironi Rishon LeZion	1–1	Ironi Ramat HaSharon
Round 26
Hapoel Nazareth Illit	2–3	Ironi Ramat HaSharon
Hapoel Acre	0–0	Ironi Rishon LeZion
Hapoel Petah Tikva	0–0	Hapoel Be'er Sheva
Hakoah Amidar Ramat Gan	1–2	Hapoel Bnei Lod
Hapoel Ra'anana	1–2	Hapoel Haifa
Hapoel Ramat Gan	1–1	Maccabi Ahi Nazareth
Round 27
Maccabi Ahi Nazareth	2–1	Hapoel Nazareth Illit
Hapoel Haifa	0–1	Hapoel Ramat Gan
Hapoel Bnei Lod	2–2	Hapoel Ra'anana
Hapoel Be'er Sheva	0–1	Hakoah Amidar Ramat Gan
Ironi Rishon LeZion	0–2	Hapoel Petah Tikva
Ironi Ramat HaSharon	4–2	Hapoel Acre
Round 28
Hapoel Nazareth Illit	0–2	Hapoel Acre
Hapoel Petah Tikva	0–1	Ironi Ramat HaSharon
Hakoah Amidar Ramat Gan	3–1	Ironi Rishon LeZion
Hapoel Ra'anana	0–0	Hapoel Be'er Sheva
Hapoel Ramat Gan	4–1	Hapoel Bnei Lod
Maccabi Ahi Nazareth	1–1	Hapoel Haifa
Round 29
Hapoel Haifa	2–0	Hapoel Nazareth Illit
Hapoel Bnei Lod	1–2	Maccabi Ahi Nazareth
Hapoel Be'er Sheva	1–0	Hapoel Ramat Gan
Ironi Rishon LeZion	0–0	Hapoel Ra'anana
Ironi Ramat HaSharon	1–1	Hakoah Amidar Ramat Gan
Hapoel Acre	2–0	Hapoel Petah Tikva
Round 30
Hapoel Petah Tikva	1–1	Hapoel Nazareth Illit
Hakoah Amidar Ramat Gan	2–0	Hapoel Acre
Hapoel Ra'anana	4–2	Ironi Ramat HaSharon
Hapoel Ramat Gan	1–1	Ironi Rishon LeZion
Maccabi Ahi Nazareth	0–1	Hapoel Be'er Sheva
Hapoel Haifa	0–2	Hapoel Bnei Lod
Round 31
Hapoel Nazareth Illit	0–1	Hapoel Bnei Lod
Hapoel Be'er Sheva	3–0	Hapoel Haifa
Ironi Rishon LeZion	1–0	Maccabi Ahi Nazareth
Ironi Ramat HaSharon	1–0	Hapoel Ramat Gan
Hapoel Acre	0–0	Hapoel Ra'anana
Hapoel Petah Tikva	1–0	Hakoah Amidar Ramat Gan
Round 32
Hakoah Amidar Ramat Gan	4–0	Hapoel Nazareth Illit
Hapoel Ra'anana	0–2	Hapoel Petah Tikva
Hapoel Ramat Gan	2–1	Hapoel Acre
Maccabi Ahi Nazareth	1–1	Ironi Ramat HaSharon
Hapoel Haifa	2–1	Ironi Rishon LeZion
Hapoel Bnei Lod	0–1	Hapoel Be'er Sheva
Round 33
Hapoel Nazareth Illit	1–2	Hapoel Be'er Sheva
Ironi Rishon LeZion	1–1	Hapoel Bnei Lod
Ironi Ramat HaSharon	1–2	Hapoel Haifa
Hapoel Acre	4–0	Maccabi Ahi Nazareth
Hapoel Petah Tikva	2–0	Hapoel Ramat Gan
Hakoah Amidar Ramat Gan	3–3	Hapoel Ra'anana

== Top goalscorers ==
Rank	Name	Club	Goals
1	(Israel) Eden Ben Basat	Hapoel Haifa	13
1	(Israel) Muhammed Kiyal	Hakoah Amidar Ramat Gan	13
3	(Israel) Sharon Gormanzo	Ironi Ramat HaSharon	12
3	(Israel) Lala Al Ma'aran	Maccabi Ahi Nazareth	12
3	(Brazil) Leandro Simioni	Hapoel Be'er Sheva	12
6	(Democratic Republic of the Congo) M'peti Nimba	Hapoel Petah Tikva	11

== See also ==
- List of Israeli football transfers 2007–08
- 2007–08 Toto Cup Leumit
