= M'peti Nimba =

Congolese footballer

Personal information
- Date of birth: 25 March 1983 (age 43)
- Place of birth: Kinshasa, DR Congo
- Height: 1.86 m (6 ft 1 in)
- Position: Striker

Senior career*
| Years | Team | Apps | (Gls) |
| 2002–2003 | SC Inter Kinshasa | | |
| 2004–2005 | Ironi Ramat HaSharon | | |
| 2005–2006 | Hapoel Acre | | |
| 2006–2007 | Hapoel Kiryat Shmona | 30 | (15) |
| 2007–2009 | Hapoel Petah Tikva | 49 | (13) |
| 2009–2010 | Hapoel Kiryat Shmona | 7 | (0) |
| 2010 | Changsha Ginde | 9 | (0) |
| 2010–2011 | Maccabi Ironi Bat Yam | 27 | (6) |
| 2011–2012 | Hapoel Kfar Saba | 7 | (2) |

International career
| 2002 | Congo DR | 1 | (0) |
- * Club domestic league appearances and goals as of September 9, 2008

M'peti Nimba (born 25 March 1983) is a Congolese football striker.

== Honours ==
- Liga Leumit (1):
  - 2006-07
- Toto Cup (Leumit) (2):
  - 2006-07, 2009
