= Michael Zandberg =

Israeli footballer

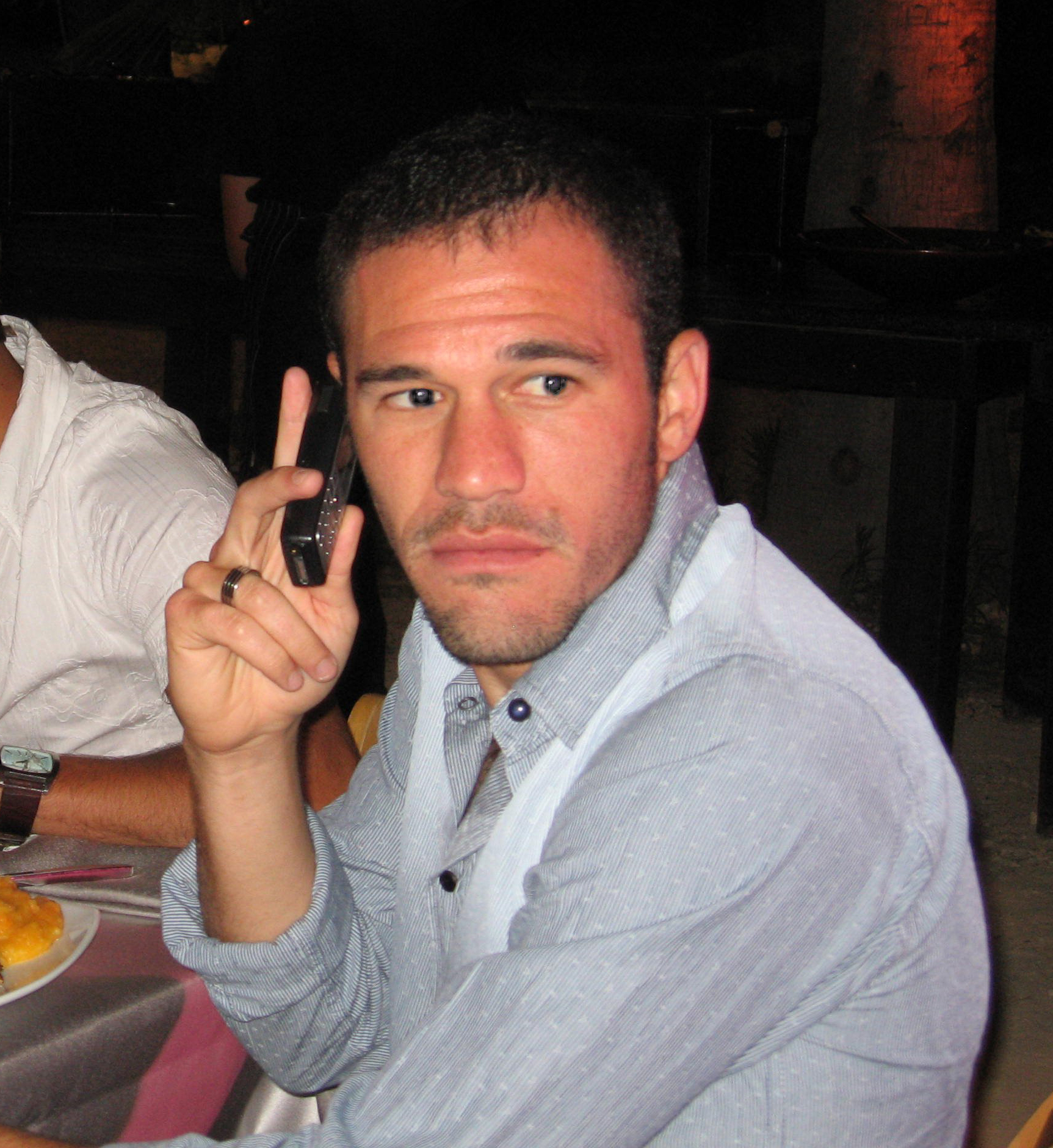
- Zandberg in 2007

Personal information
- Date of birth: April 16, 1980 (age 46)
- Place of birth: Ramat Gan, Israel
- Height: 1.80 m (5 ft 11 in)
- Position: Winger

Youth career
- 1995–1998: Hapoel Ramat Gan

Senior career*
Years	Team	Apps	(Gls)
1998–2002	Hapoel Petah Tikva	109	(14)
2002–2006	Maccabi Haifa	117	(33)
2006–2009	Beitar Jerusalem	85	(10)
2009–2010	Hapoel Tel Aviv	14	(1)
2010	Bnei Yehuda	12	(0)
2010–2011	Maccabi Petah Tikva	29	(2)
2011–2012	Hapoel Haifa	10	(0)
2012–2013	Hapoel Ramat Gan	21	(2)
2013–2015	Ironi Nir Ramat HaSharon	52	(1)
2015–2017	Hapoel Rishon LeZion	57	(2)
2017–2018	Hapoel Ramat Gan	15	(0)
2020–2021	F.C. HaMakthesh Givatayim	5	(2)

International career
1997	Israel U-18	5	(1)
1999–2001	Israel U-21	10	(4)
2002–2007	Israel	20	(4)

Managerial career
- 2020–2021: Hapoel Tel Aviv U17
- 2021–2022: Hapoel Tel Aviv U19
- 2022–2023: Hapoel Tel Aviv (assistant)
- 2023–2025: Maccabi Tel Aviv U19
- 2025: Hapoel Ramat Gan
- * Club domestic league appearances and goals

Michael Zandberg (Hebrew: מיכאל זנדברג; born April 16, 1980) is an Israeli former football player

== Career ==
He played for Hapoel Petah Tikva until he was 22 years of age, playing 130 games in all club competitions.

In the summer of 2002 he moved to Maccabi Haifa where he played four years. He won three championships, a Toto Cup and also played in the UEFA Champions League with Haifa. Zandberg made 172 caps in all club competitions, scoring 43 goals and provided 20 assists while part of the club.

In the 2000s, Zandberg was one of the best wingers in Israeli football and was a regular member of the Israel national team having won 20 caps for the national side. In that time period, Zandberg received interest from teams in the Eredivisie, the Premier League, and from the Bundesliga.

In the summer of 2006, Zandberg transferred to Beitar Jerusalem for a four-year contract worth $1,200,000. Overall in all club competitions he played 106 games, scored 15 goals, and provided 22 assists in three seasons at Beitar.

In May 2007, it was revealed that Zandberg had agreed on a $600,000 one-year contract with English side Sheffield United, but when Sheffield United was relegated to the English 2nd division on the final day of the season, Zandberg decided against the move.

At the end of 2006–07 Israeli Premier League, Zandberg was chosen as the Player of the Season.

In July 2009, he signed a one-year contract with Hapoel Tel Aviv worth $150,000. After half a season with Hapoel he was transferred to Bnei Yehuda.

In July 2010, he signed a one-year contract with Maccabi Petah Tikva.

After a very poor season in Petah Tikva he was again on the move, this time landing a one-year deal with Hapoel Haifa.

In July 2012, he signed with Hapoel Ramat Gan, his boyhood club.

On October 17, 2018, Zandberg announced his retirement from an active game at the age of 38. In 2020, at the age of 40, he came back from retirement and joined Hamakthesh Givatayim.

== Personal life ==
His sister is Israeli politician Tamar Zandberg.

== Honours ==
- Israeli Premier League (5):
  - 2003–04, 2004–05, 2005–06, 2006–07, 2007–08
- Toto Cup (1):
  - 2005–06
- State Cup (2):
  - 2008, 2013
- Israeli Footballer of the Year (1):
  - 2007
