= Derek Boateng =

Ghanaian footballer

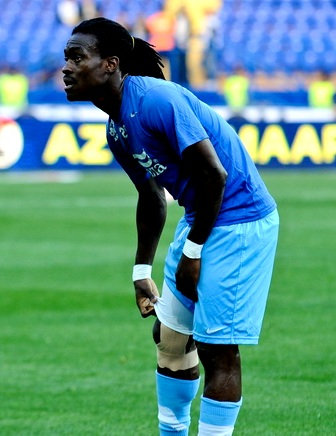

Personal information
- Full name: Derek Owusu Boateng
- Date of birth: 2 May 1983 (age 43)
- Place of birth: Accra, Ghana
- Height: 6 ft 1 in (1.85 m)
- Position: Midfielder

Youth career
- Liberty Professionals

Senior career*
Years	Team	Apps	(Gls)
1999–2001	Kalamata	27	(9)
2001–2003	Panathinaikos	34	(6)
2002–2003	→ OFI (loan)	12	(1)
2003–2006	AIK	55	(5)
2006–2008	Beitar Jerusalem	72	(8)
2008–2009	1. FC Köln	10	(0)
2009–2011	Getafe	77	(2)
2011–2013	Dnipro Dnipropetrovsk	23	(2)
2013–2014	Fulham	3	(0)
2014	Rayo Vallecano	0	(0)
2014–2015	Eibar	13	(0)
2016–2017	Rayo OKC	28	(0)
2017	OFI	13	(2)
Total		367	(35)

International career^{‡}
2001–2013	Ghana	47	(1)
- * Club domestic league appearances and goals as of 29 April 2017 ‡ National team caps and goals as of 9 February 2013

Derek Owusu Boateng (/ˈboʊtɛŋ/ BOH-teng; born 2 May 1983) is a Ghanaian former professional footballer who played as a defensive midfielder. Born in Ghana, Boateng went on to play professional football in Greece, Sweden, Israel, Germany, Spain, Ukraine, England, and the United States during a career that spanned between 1999 and 2017. A full international between 2001 and 2013, he won 47 caps for the Ghana national team and represented his country at the 2006 and 2010 FIFA World Cups.

== Club career ==
=== Early career ===
Boateng was born in Accra, Greater Accra, where he played for the local side Liberty Professionals.

=== Greece ===
He signed for Kalamata in Greece when he was 16. In 2001, Boateng joined another Super League club, Panathinaikos. In 2002, Boateng was unable to keep his place in the Panathinaikos squad and was sent on loan to OFI.

=== AIK ===
He signed for AIK in August 2003. In the 2004 season, AIK was relegated from Allsvenskan for the third time in the history of the club. In the following season, AIK gained promotion after winning the Superettan, distancing runners-up Östers IF by nine points. Boateng extended his contract with AIK for one more year until the end of 2007. When he left for Beitar Jerusalem, Boateng stated in an interview that he loves Sweden and AIK, and that he one day will come back to Allsvenskan and AIK the team he supports.

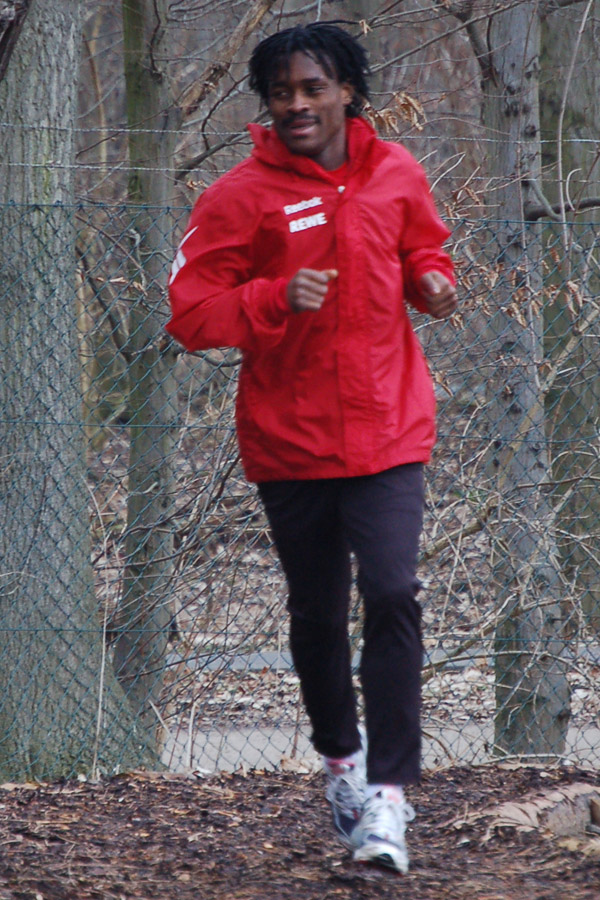
Derek Boateng training with 1. FC Köln

=== Beitar Jerusalem ===
In July 2006, Boateng signed with Beitar Jerusalem until January 2009. Boateng helped Beitar Jerusalem to win the league for the fifth time in their history, and for the first time for 10 years, contributing four goals in the campaign.

The 2007–08 season started off poorly for Boateng, as he got sent off during Beitar Jerusalem's first official game of the season, in leg one of the second qualifying round for the 2007–08 UEFA Champions League, away to F.C. Copenhagen. Beitar Jerusalem lost 2–1 on aggregate and were eliminated. Boateng ended the season with another championship for Beitar Jerusalem. At the Israel State Cup final, Boateng missed a penalty in a thrilling penalty shootout against Hapoel Tel Aviv, but Beitar Jerusalem secured the title with a 5–4 win at the shootout, and secured an historical double.

The 2008–09 season started with yet another early elimination at the second qualification round for the UEFA Champions League, this time with a 5–0 away defeat to Wisła Kraków, and 6–2 in aggregate.

Whilst with Beitar, Boateng received financial backing whilst raising a lawsuit against his former agent.

=== Köln and Getafe ===
On 21 January 2009, Boateng signed a four-year contract with 1. FC Köln. However, on 31 July 2009, Getafe CF signed him from Köln for one million euros. He stayed at the Spanish club for just over two seasons, making 61 appearances and scoring two goals.

=== Dnipro Dnipropetrovsk ===
On 20 June 2011, Boateng completed a move to Ukrainian club FC Dnipro Dnipropetrovsk, signing a four-year contract. For Dnipro Derek mostly played in the 2011–12, while the next season he was side benched by the head coach after playing the first couple of games for the first team. Later after playing some games for the reserve team, Boateng lost interest of playing for the club at all.

=== Fulham ===
In May 2013, Boateng confirmed that he had moved on a free transfer to Premier League side Fulham on Ghanaian radio. He said, "I have signed a two-year deal with Fulham and will be training with them for the first time [on Tuesday]. "I believe it's a good move and I'm finally happy to see this deal [confirmed]."

Fulham officially confirmed Boateng signed a one-year deal with an option for a further year on 22 May 2013. He featured in the 2013–14 English Premier League opener against Sunderland where he played only 65 minutes and was substituted by Giorgos Karagounis.

=== Rayo Vallecano and Eibar ===
After his contract with Fulham expired, Boateng decided to join Spanish club Rayo Vallecano on 3 June 2014. However, only two months later, he was deemed surplus to requirements by manager Paco Jémez, and rescinded his link with the Madrid outfit on 18 August.

Hours after rescinding with Rayo, Boateng signed a one-year deal with fellow league club SD Eibar.

After leaving Eibar, Boateng returned to Beitar Jerusalem to train with them whilst looking for a move in the upcoming transfer window.

=== Rayo OKC ===
On 25 January 2016, Boateng signed with expansion side Rayo OKC of the North American Soccer League.

=== OFI ===
On 30 January 2017, Boateng signed with Football League side OFI till the end of the season. It is expected with his experience to help the club in his effort to be promoted in the Super League Greece.

== International career ==
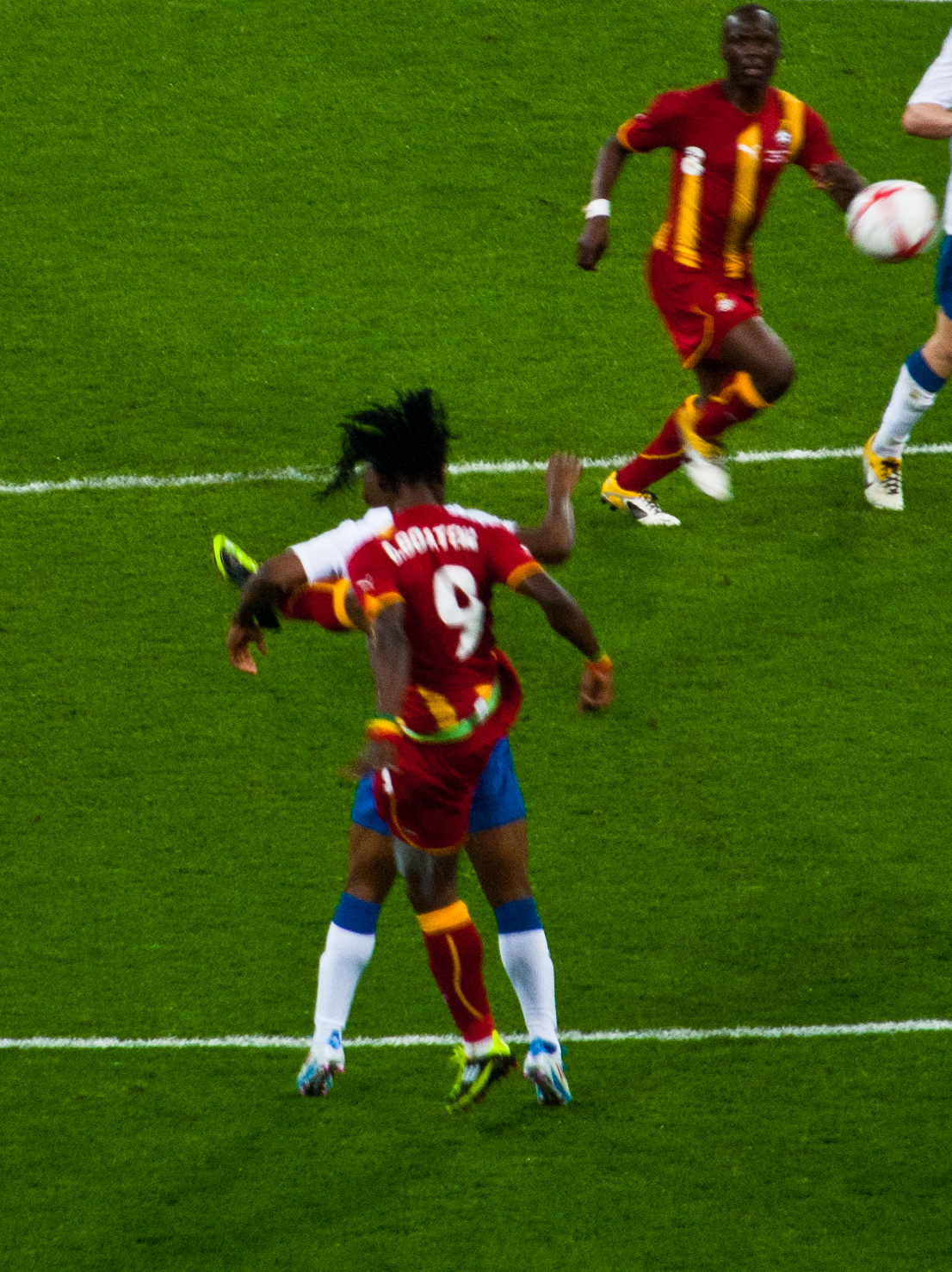
Boateng in action with the squad number 9, for the Ghana national team against England national team.

While playing for Panathinaikos in 2001, Boateng also played for the Ghana national football team at the FIFA World Youth Championship in Argentina, in which Ghana progressed to the final. After participating in a friendly with Ghana against French club Nice, he was selected for the Ghana squad at the 2006 FIFA World Cup. He made his first FIFA World Cup appearance on 17 June 2006, when he replaced Otto Addo at half-time in the 2–0 win against the Czech Republic. He was also selected for the national team for the 2010 FIFA World Cup, in which Ghana progressed to the quarter-finals.

== Career statistics ==
=== International ===
Appearances and goals by national team and year

Team	Year	Apps	Goals
Ghana	2001	1	0
Ghana	2002	6	1
Ghana	2003	3	0
Ghana	2004	1	0
Ghana	2005	0	0
Ghana	2006	5	0
Ghana	2007	2	0
Ghana	2008	0	0
Ghana	2009	1	0
Ghana	2010	3	0
Ghana	2011	8	0
Ghana	2012	10	0
Ghana	2013	7	0
Total		47	1

== Honours ==
AIK

- Superettan: 2005

Beitar Jerusalem

- Israeli Premier League: 2006–07, 2007–08
- Israel State Cup: 2008

Ghana U20

- FIFA World Youth Championship runner-up: 2001

Individual

- 2007–08 Israeli Premier League Best Foreign Player of the Year
