= Moshe Biton =

Israeli footballer

Moshe Biton משה ביטון
Personal information
- Date of birth: November 18, 1982 (age 43)
- Place of birth: Bat Yam, Israel
- Position: Forward

Youth career
- Maccabi Jaffa
- Maccabi Petah Tikva FC

Senior career*
Years	Team	Apps	(Gls)
2001–2002	Maccabi Petach Tikva FC	6	(0)
2002–2004	Beitar Jerusalem	17	(2)
2004–2006	Bnei Yehuda	57	(17)
2006–2007	Maccabi Tel Aviv F.C.	27	(4)
2007–2011	Bnei Yehuda	74	(18)
2011–2012	Hapoel Haifa	6	(0)
2012–2014	Maccabi Jaffa	30	(5)

International career
2005–2006	Israel	4	(0)
- * Club domestic league appearances and goals

Moshe Biton (Hebrew: משה ביטון; born 18 November 1982) is an Israeli footballer.
