= Idan Tal =

Israeli footballer (born 1975)

Idan Tal עידן טל
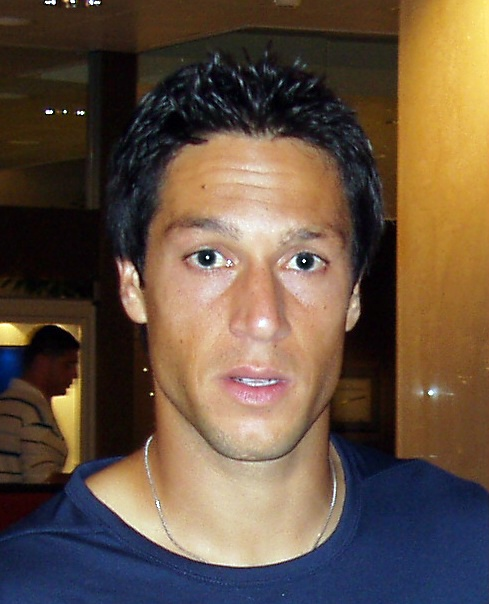
- Tal in 2006

Personal information
- Date of birth: 13 September 1975 (age 51)
- Place of birth: Beersheba, Israel
- Height: 1.80 m (5 ft 11 in)
- Position: Midfielder

Youth career
- Hapoel Jerusalem

Senior career*
| Years | Team | Apps | (Gls) |
| 1994–1996 | Hapoel Jerusalem | 2 | (0) |
| 1997–1998 | Maccabi Petah Tikva | 71 | (10) |
| 1998–2000 | Hapoel Tel Aviv | 14 | (2) |
| 1999–2000 | → Mérida (loan) | 36 | (5) |
| 2000 | Maccabi Petah Tikva | 7 | (1) |
| 2000–2002 | Everton | 29 | (2) |
| 2003 | Rayo Vallecano | 6 | (0) |
| 2003–2006 | Maccabi Haifa | 109 | (30) |
| 2006–2007 | Bolton Wanderers | 16 | (0) |
| 2007–2011 | Beitar Jerusalem | 122 | (16) |
| 2011–2013 | Hapoel Jerusalem | 53 | (3) |
| Total | | 465 | (69) |

International career
| 1995–1997 | Israel U21 | 13 | (2) |
| 1998–2007 | Israel | 69 | (6) |

Managerial career
- 2013: Hapoel Jerusalem
- * Club domestic league appearances and goals

Idan Tal (Hebrew: עידן טל; born 13 September 1975) is an Israeli former professional footballer who played as a midfielder.

== Early life ==
Tal was born in Beersheba, Israel, and is Jewish. He lives in Haifa, is married to Doreen, and has two children, Miron and Amit.

== Club career ==
Tal started his career at Hapoel Jerusalem FC, moving to Maccabi Petah Tikva midway through the 1996–97 season. He joined his next club, Hapoel Tel Aviv, in the same period of 1998–99, winning the Israel State Cup with the side (its first title in 11 years).

In 1999–2000 Tal represented CP Mérida in Spain. Even though the Extremadura team finished in sixth position in the second division, it would be relegated due to irregularities, and he returned to Maccabi Petah Tikva, playing a handful of games before changing teams – and countries – again, as he signed with Everton in October 2000, appearing sparingly over the course of two 1/2 seasons.

In January 2003 Tal was released and returned to Spain, joining La Liga side Rayo Vallecano and suffering another relegation, this time on the pitch. In the summer, he signed for Maccabi Haifa.

On 9 November 2005, Tal received French citizenship, a process that took him five years to complete: his eligibility came through his wife Doreen, of French descent. The fact that he had acquired a European passport, along with his contract with Maccabi being due to expire at the end of the season, allowed him to renegotiate a return to Europe on a free transfer, where he would not count as a foreign player. In July 2006 he left the national champions to return to England, signing with Bolton Wanderers and sharing teams with compatriot Tal Ben Haim.

During his sole season, as Bolton qualified for the UEFA Cup as seventh, Tal appeared almost exclusively from the bench (12 out of his 16 Premier League appearances). He scored once, against Doncaster Rovers for the season's FA Cup. In July 2007, at nearly 32, he was sold to Beitar Jerusalem, signing a three-year contract worth £246,000.

Tal returned to Hapoel Jerusalem in July 2011, agreeing to a three-year deal with the second level outfit. On 26 October 2011, he revealed that, although he had signed a long-term contract, he would retire at the end of the season if he did not achieve promotion to the top flight, which eventually happened yet Tal continued to play for Hapoel. In April of the following year he was given a US$2000 fine and a month-long suspension by the club, after an argument with Hapoel manager Michael Kadosh.

== International career ==
Tal earned 69 caps for the Israel national team during nine years, scoring five goals.

== Managerial career ==
On 30 June 2013, Tal was appointed the manager of Hapoel Jerusalem. In December he left the job due to poor results.

== Managerial statistics ==
| Team | Nat | From | To | Record | | | | |
| Team | Nat | From | To | G | W | D | L | Win % |
|---|---|---|---|---|---|---|---|---|
| Hapoel Jerusalem | (Israel) | 30 June 2013 | 4 December 2013 | 13 | 3 | 5 | 5 | 23.08 |
| Total | | | | 13 | 3 | 5 | 5 | 23.08 |

== Honours ==
- Israeli League: 2003–04, 2004–05, 2005–06, 2007–08
- Israeli Cup: 1998–99, 2007–08, 2008–09
- Toto Cup: 2005–06, 2009–10

Individual

- Israeli Player of the Year: 2004–05
