= 2007–08 Israel State Cup =

Tournament details
- Country: Israel

Final positions
- Champions: Beitar Jerusalem (6th title)
- Runners-up: Hapoel Tel Aviv

The 2007–08 Israel State Cup (Hebrew: גביע המדינה, Gvia HaMedina) was the 69th season of Israel's nationwide football cup competition and the 54th after the Israeli Declaration of Independence.

The competition was won by Beitar Jerusalem who had beaten Hapoel Tel Aviv on penalties after 0–0 in the final.

As Beitar Jerusalem won the double, Hapoel Tel Aviv qualified to the 2008–09 UEFA Cup, entering in the first qualifying round.

== Calendar ==
Round	Date
First round	September 28 and 29, 2007
Second round	October 5 and 6, 2007
Third round	October 12 to 17, 2007
Fourth round	October 30, 2007
Fifth round	December 4, 2007
Sixth round	January 8 and 15, 2008
Seventh Round	January 22, 2008
Eighth Round	February 5, 2008
Ninth Round	February 26 and 27, 2008
Round of 16	March 11 and 12, 2008
Quarterfinals	April 1 and 2, 2008
Semifinals	April 16, 2008
Final	May 13, 2008

== Results ==
=== Seventh Round ===
Home team	Score	Away team
F.C. Maccabi Nazareth Illit	0–1	Maccabi Ironi Bat Yam
Maccabi Kafr Kanna	3–1	Maccabi Sektzia Ma'alot-Tarshiha
Maccabi Ironi Kiryat Ata	3–0	Hapoel Mevaseret Zion
Hapoel Bnei Jadeidi	1–0 (a.e.t.)	Hapoel Kfar Shalem
Maccabi HaShikma Ramat Hen	2–2 (a.e.t.) (2–4 p.)	Hapoel Marmorek
Hapoel Azor	1–2	Maccabi Yavne
Beitar Safed	1–0	Hapoel Tzafririm Holon
Maccabi Ironi Tirat HaCarmel	7–0	Beitar Nahariya
Beitar Ironi Ma'ale Adumim	3–3 (a.e.t.) (2–3 p.)	Hapoel Asi Gilboa
Hapoel Hadera	3–1	Hapoel Bnei Tamra
Hapoel Ashkelon	2–4 (a.e.t.)	Hapoel Umm al-Fahm
Sektzia Nes Tziona	6–0	Maccabi Kiryat Malakhi

Byes: Beitar Shimshon Tel Aviv, Hapoel Bnei Jisr az-Zarqa, Hapoel Iksal, Hapoel Jerusalem.

=== Eighth Round ===
Home team	Score	Away team
Hapoel Bnei Jadeidi	2–2 (a.e.t.) (3–4 p.)	Hapoel Asi Gilboa
Maccabi Kafr Kanna	2–1	Hapoel Jerusalem
Hapoel Marmorek	3–2	Hapoel Iksal
Beitar Shimshon Tel Aviv	3–1	Maccabi Ironi Tirat HaCarmel
Hapoel Hadera	2–1	Beitar Safed
Maccabi Ironi Bat Yam	4–1	Maccabi Yavne
Hapoel Bnei Jisr az-Zarqa	0–4	Hapoel Umm al-Fahm
Sektzia Nes Tziona	1–3	Maccabi Ironi Kiryat Ata

=== Ninth Round ===
Home team	Score	Away team
Ironi Nir Ramat HaSharon	3–1 (a.e.t.)	Hapoel Ra'anana
Maccabi Ironi Kiryat Ata	1–0	Hapoel Bnei Lod
Hapoel Ramat Gan	1–0	Hapoel Asi Gilboa
Bnei Yehuda	2–0	Maccabi Kafr Kanna
Hapoel Petah Tikva	4–3	Maccabi Herzliya
Ironi Rishon LeZion	1–0	Hapoel Acre
Maccabi Ironi Bat Yam	0–2	Hakoah Amidar Ramat Gan
Hapoel Hadera	0–4	Maccabi Ahi Nazareth
Hapoel Be'er Sheva	1–1 (a.e.t.) (4–1 p.)	Hapoel Marmorek
Beitar Shimshon Tel Aviv	1–0 (a.e.t.)	Maccabi Tel Aviv
Hapoel Haifa	1–2 (a.e.t.)	Hapoel Kfar Saba
F.C. Ashdod	0–2	Ironi Kiryat Shmona
Hapoel Tel Aviv	3–1	Hapoel Nazareth Illit
Maccabi Petah Tikva	0–2	Maccabi Haifa
Maccabi Netanya	3–3 (a.e.t.) (3–1 p.)	Hapoel Umm al-Fahm
Bnei Sakhnin	1–1 (a.e.t.) (1–3 p.)	Beitar Jerusalem

=== Round of 16 to the Final ===
Games were played from March 11, 2008 to May 13, 2008.

Round of 16
March 12, 2008
Ironi Kiryat Shmona	2
Maccabi Ironi Kiryat Ata	1
March 11, 2008
Beitar Shimshon Tel Aviv	2
Hapoel Petah Tikva	0
March 12, 2008
Hapoel Be'er Sheva	0
Hapoel Tel Aviv	1
March 11, 2008
Bnei Yehuda	1
Ironi Nir Ramat HaSharon	0
March 11, 2008
Maccabi Ahi Nazareth	0
Beitar Jerusalem	3
March 11, 2008
Ironi Rishon LeZion	4
Hapoel Kfar Saba	5
March 11, 2008
Hakoah Ramat Gan	0 (5)
Hapoel Ramat Gan	0 (3)
March 12, 2008
Maccabi Netanya	1
Maccabi Haifa	0

Quarter-finals
April 2, 2008
Ironi Kiryat Shmona	1
Beitar Shimshon Tel Aviv	2
April 2, 2008
Hapoel Tel Aviv	2
Bnei Yehuda	0
April 2, 2008
Beitar Jerusalem	3
Hapoel Kfar Saba	2
April 1, 2008
Hakoah Ramat Gan	1 (0)
Maccabi Netanya	1 (3)

Semi-finals
April 16, 2008
Beitar Shimshon Tel Aviv	1 (8)
Hapoel Tel Aviv	1 (9)
April 16, 2008
Beitar Jerusalem	1
Maccabi Netanya	0

Final
May 13, 2008
Hapoel Tel Aviv	0 (4)
Beitar Jerusalem	0 (5)

2007–08 Israel State Cup Winners
Beitar Jerusalem
