= Football in Israel =

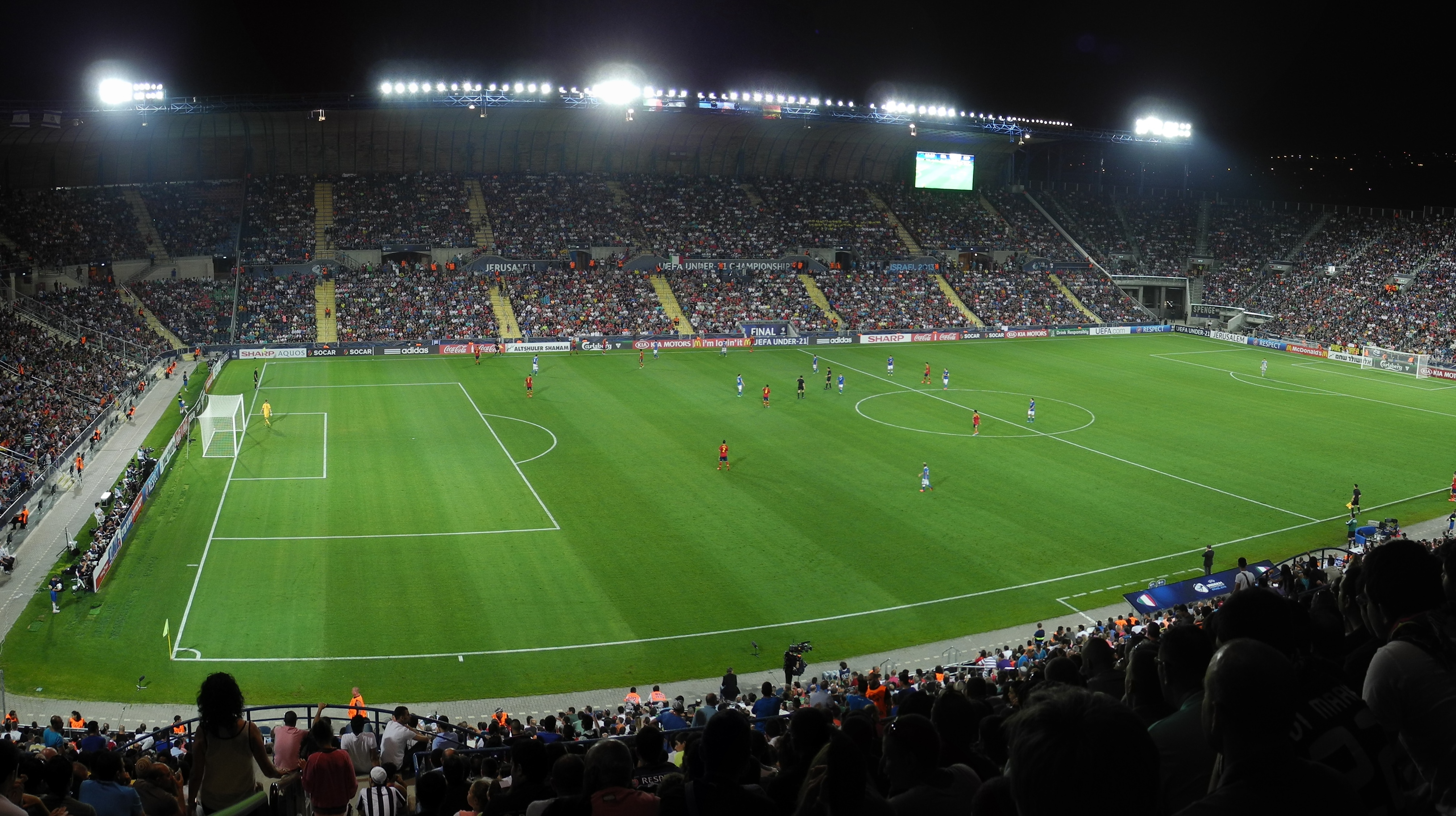
- Teddy Stadium, home of Israel national football team and two Israeli clubs
- Country: Israel
- Governing body: Israel Football Association
- National team: Men's national team

National competitions
- Israel State Cup; Toto Cup; Israel Super Cup

Club competitions
- Israeli Premier League; Liga Leumit; Liga Alef; Liga Bet; Liga Gimel

International competitions
- UEFA Champions League; UEFA Europa League; UEFA Conference League; Super Cup; FIFA Club World Cup; FIFA Intercontinental Cup; FIFA World Cup (National Team); European Championship (National Team); UEFA Nations League (National Team)

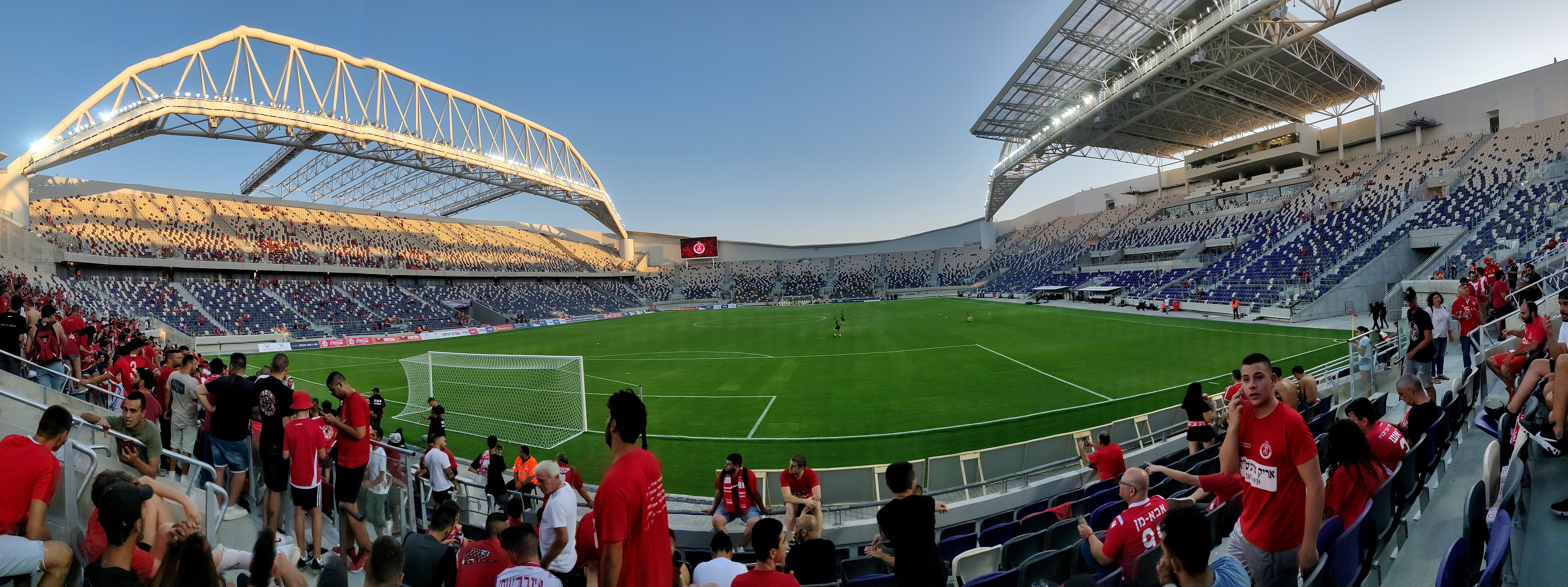
Bloomfield Stadium in Tel Aviv, home of Maccabi Tel Aviv and Hapoel Tel Aviv

Football (Hebrew: כַּדוּרֶגֶל, Kaduregel, lit. 'legball'), also known as soccer, is the most popular sport in Israel. Approximately 55% of the people in Israel are considered association football fans. Football as an organised sport, first developed in the United Kingdom, who controlled Mandatory Palestine during the days of the British Mandate.

The Israel Football Association joined the Asian Football Confederation in 1954, but was expelled in 1974 due to political pressure from Arab and Muslim members in the context of the Arab–Israeli conflict. In the late 1970s and 1980s, the Israel Football Association was not affiliated with any confederation. During this period, the Israeli national teams were only playing in FIFA competitions occasionally in OFC, UEFA and CONMEBOL qualifying tournaments. Finally, it was admitted to UEFA as an associate member in 1992 and as a full member in 1994, therefore their teams compete as part of Europe in all international competitions.

== Israel Football Association ==
The Israel Football Association (IFA) is the governing body of football in the State of Israel. All of Israel's professional football clubs must be members, and hundreds of semi-professional and amateur clubs also belong.

== League system ==
As of the 19-20 season, the Israeli football league system has five levels and 16 different divisions, all run by the IFA. Promotion and relegation operate between each level, allowing clubs to progress from bottom to top within four seasons.

=== Structure ===
The current structure of the Israeli league system is this:

- Israeli Premier League: the top division operates at the national level and has 14 member clubs
- Liga Leumit: the second division operates at the national level and has 16 member clubs
- Liga Alef: the third division is split into two regional leagues (north and south) and has 32 member clubs (16 in each division)
- Liga Bet: the fourth division is split into four regional leagues (two in the north, two in the south) and has 64 member clubs (16 in each division)
- Liga Gimel: the fifth division is split into eight regional leagues and has 114 member clubs (between 11 and 16 in each division)

== Cups ==
In Israel, there are two major cup competitions: the State Cup and the Toto Cup.

=== State Cup ===
The State Cup (Hebrew: גביע המדינה, Gvia HaMedina) is the Israeli equivalent of the English FA Cup, and is open to all Israeli clubs, with clubs at the higher levels entering in the later rounds. It is a straightforward knock-out cup. The winner qualifies for the UEFA Europa Conference League.

=== Toto Cup ===
The Toto Cup (Hebrew: גביע הטוטו, Gvia HaToto) is the Israeli equivalent of the English League Cup, the main difference being that there is a separate cup for the top and second divisions. The cup is played first in a group stage, with the highest placed teams qualifying for the knock-out stages. The winner does not qualify for the UEFA Europa Conference League.

== Title Holders ==
Season	League Champions	State Cup holder	Toto Cup holder
1928–29 ( SC)	Not Held	Hapoel Tel Aviv; Maccabi Hasmonean Jerusalem	Not Held
1929–30 ( SC)	Not Held	Maccabi Tel Aviv	Not Held
1930–31 ( SC)	Not Held	Maccabi Tel Aviv	Not Held
1931–32 (PL)	British Police	Not Held	Not Held
1932–33 (PL, SC)	Not Held	British Police	Not Held
1933–34 (PL, SC)	Hapoel Tel Aviv	Maccabi Tel Aviv	Not Held
1934–35 (PL, SC)	Hapoel Tel Aviv	Hapoel Tel Aviv	Not Held
1935–36 (PL, SC)	Maccabi Tel Aviv	Maccabi Petah Tikva	Not Held
1936–37 (PL)	Not Held		Not Held
1937 (PL, SC)	Maccabi Tel Aviv	Hapoel Tel Aviv	Not Held
1938 (PL, SC)	Hapoel Tel Aviv	Hapoel Tel Aviv	Not Held
1939 ( SC)	Not Held	Hapoel Tel Aviv	Not Held
1940 (PL, SC)	Hapoel Tel Aviv	Beitar Tel Aviv	Not Held
1941–42 (PL, SC)	Maccabi Tel Aviv	Maccabi Tel Aviv	Not Held
1942–43 (PL, SC)	Not Finished	Beitar Tel Aviv	Not Held
1943–44 (PL)	Hapoel Tel Aviv	Not Official	Not Held
1944–45 (PL)	Hapoel Tel Aviv	Not Official	Not Held
1945–46	Not Held	Not Official	Not Held
1946–47 (PL, SC)	Maccabi Tel Aviv	Maccabi Tel Aviv	Not Held
1947–48 (PL, SC)	Not Finished	Maccabi Tel Aviv	Not Held
1948–49 (PL)	Not Finished	Not Held	Not Held
1949–50 (PL)	Maccabi Tel Aviv	Not Held	Not Held
1950–51	Not Held	Not Held	Not Held
1951–52 (PL, SC)	Maccabi Tel Aviv	Maccabi Petah Tikva	Not Held
1952–53	Not Held		Not Held
1953–54 (PL, SC)	Maccabi Tel Aviv	Maccabi Tel Aviv	Not Held
1954–55 (PL, SC)	Hapoel Petah Tikva	Maccabi Tel Aviv	Not Held
1955–56 (PL)	Maccabi Tel Aviv	Not Held	Not Held
1956–57 (PL, SC)	Hapoel Tel Aviv	Hapoel Petah Tikva	Not Held
1957–58 (PL, SC)	Maccabi Tel Aviv	Maccabi Tel Aviv	Not Held
1958–59 (PL, SC)	Hapoel Petah Tikva	Maccabi Tel Aviv	Not Held
1959–60 (PL)	Hapoel Petah Tikva	Not Held	Not Held
1960–61 (PL, SC)	Hapoel Petah Tikva	Hapoel Tel Aviv	Not Held
1961–62 (PL, SC)	Hapoel Petah Tikva	Maccabi Haifa	Not Held
1962–63 (PL, SC)	Hapoel Petah Tikva	Hapoel Haifa	Not Held
1963–64 (PL, SC)	Hapoel Ramat Gan	Maccabi Tel Aviv	Not Held
1964–65 (PL, SC)	Hakoah Ramat Gan	Maccabi Tel Aviv	Not Held
1965–66 (PL, SC)	Hapoel Tel Aviv	Hapoel Haifa	Not Held
1966–67 (PL, SC)	Maccabi Tel Aviv	Maccabi Tel Aviv	Not Held
1967–68 ( SC)	Maccabi Tel Aviv	Bnei Yehuda	Not Held
1968–69 (PL, SC)	Hapoel Tel Aviv	Hakoah Ramat Gan	Not Held
1969–70 (PL, SC)	Maccabi Tel Aviv	Maccabi Tel Aviv	Not Held
1970–71 (PL, SC)	Maccabi Netanya	Hakoah Ramat Gan	Not Held
1971–72 (PL, SC)	Maccabi Tel Aviv	Hapoel Tel Aviv	Not Held
1972–73 (PL, SC)	Hakoah Ramat Gan	Hapoel Jerusalem	Not Held
1973–74 (PL, SC)	Maccabi Netanya	Hapoel Haifa	Not Held
1974–75 (PL, SC)	Hapoel Be'er Sheva	Hapoel Kfar Saba	Not Held
1975–76 (PL, SC)	Hapoel Be'er Sheva	Beitar Jerusalem	Not Held
1976–77 (PL, SC)	Maccabi Tel Aviv	Maccabi Tel Aviv	Not Held
1977–78 (PL, SC)	Maccabi Netanya	Maccabi Netanya	Not Held
1978–79 (PL, SC)	Maccabi Tel Aviv	Beitar Jerusalem	Not Held
1979–80 (PL, SC)	Maccabi Netanya	Hapoel Kfar Saba	Not Held
1980–81 (PL, SC)	Hapoel Tel Aviv	Bnei Yehuda	Not Held
1981–82 (PL, SC)	Hapoel Kfar Saba	Hapoel Yehud	Not Held
1982–83 (PL, SC)	Maccabi Netanya	Hapoel Tel Aviv	Not Held
1983–84 (PL, SC)	Maccabi Haifa	Hapoel Lod	Not Held
1984–85 (PL, SC, TC)	Maccabi Haifa	Beitar Jerusalem	Maccabi Yavne
1985–86 (PL, SC, TC)	Hapoel Tel Aviv	Beitar Jerusalem	Hapoel Petah Tikva
1986–87 (PL, SC, TC)	Beitar Jerusalem	Maccabi Tel Aviv	Shimshon Tel Aviv
1987–88 (PL, SC, TC)	Hapoel Tel Aviv	Maccabi Tel Aviv	Shimshon Tel Aviv
1988–89 (PL, SC, TC)	Maccabi Haifa	Beitar Jerusalem	Hapoel Be'er Sheva
1989–90 (PL, SC, TC)	Bnei Yehuda	Hapoel Kfar Saba	Hapoel Petah Tikva
1990–91 (PL, SC, TC)	Maccabi Haifa	Maccabi Haifa	Hapoel Petah Tikva
1991–92 (PL, SC, TC)	Maccabi Tel Aviv	Hapoel Petah Tikva	Bnei Yehuda
1992–93 (PL, SC, TC)	Beitar Jerusalem	Maccabi Haifa	Maccabi Tel Aviv
1993–94 (PL, SC, TC)	Maccabi Haifa	Maccabi Tel Aviv	Maccabi Haifa
1994–95 (PL, SC, TC)	Maccabi Tel Aviv	Maccabi Haifa	Maccabi Petah Tikva
1995–96 (PL, SC, TC)	Maccabi Tel Aviv	Maccabi Tel Aviv	Hapoel Be'er Sheva
1996–97 (PL, SC, TC)	Beitar Jerusalem	Hapoel Be'er Sheva	Bnei Yehuda
1997–98 (PL, SC, TC)	Beitar Jerusalem	Maccabi Haifa	Beitar Jerusalem
1998–99 (PL, SC, TC)	Hapoel Haifa	Hapoel Tel Aviv	Maccabi Tel Aviv
1999–2000 (PL, SC, TC)	Hapoel Tel Aviv	Hapoel Tel Aviv	Maccabi Petah Tikva
2000–01 (PL, SC, TC)	Maccabi Haifa	Maccabi Tel Aviv	Hapoel Haifa
2001–02 (PL, SC, TC)	Maccabi Haifa	Maccabi Tel Aviv	Hapoel Tel Aviv
2002–03 (PL, SC, TC)	Maccabi Tel Aviv	Hapoel Ramat Gan	Maccabi Haifa
2003–04 (PL, SC, TC)	Maccabi Haifa	Bnei Sakhnin	Maccabi Petah Tikva
2004–05 (PL, SC, TC)	Maccabi Haifa	Maccabi Tel Aviv	Hapoel Petah Tikva
2005–06 (PL, SC, TC)	Maccabi Haifa	Hapoel Tel Aviv	Maccabi Haifa
2006–07 (PL, SC, TC)	Beitar Jerusalem	Hapoel Tel Aviv	Maccabi Herzliya
2007–08 (PL, SC, TC)	Beitar Jerusalem	Beitar Jerusalem	Maccabi Haifa
2008–09 (PL, SC, TC)	Maccabi Haifa	Beitar Jerusalem	Maccabi Tel Aviv
2009–10 (PL, SC, TC)	Hapoel Tel Aviv	Hapoel Tel Aviv	Beitar Jerusalem
2010–11 (PL, SC, TC)	Maccabi Haifa	Hapoel Tel Aviv	Ironi Kiryat Shmona
2011–12 (PL, SC, TC)	Ironi Kiryat Shmona	Hapoel Tel Aviv	Ironi Kiryat Shmona
2012–13 (PL, SC, TC)	Maccabi Tel Aviv	Hapoel Ramat Gan	Hapoel Haifa
2013–14 (PL, SC)	Maccabi Tel Aviv	Ironi Kiryat Shmona	—N/a
2014–15 (PL, SC, TC)	Maccabi Tel Aviv	Maccabi Tel Aviv	Maccabi Tel Aviv
2015–16 (PL, SC, TC)	Hapoel Be'er Sheva	Maccabi Haifa	Maccabi Petah Tikva
2016–17 (PL, SC, TC)	Hapoel Be'er Sheva	Bnei Yehuda	Hapoel Be'er Sheva
2017–18 (PL, SC, TC)	Hapoel Be'er Sheva	Hapoel Haifa	Maccabi Tel Aviv
2018–19 (PL, SC, TC)	Maccabi Tel Aviv	Bnei Yehuda	Maccabi Tel Aviv
2019–20 (PL, SC, TC)	Maccabi Tel Aviv	Hapoel Be'er Sheva	Beitar Jerusalem
2020–21 (PL, SC, TC)	Maccabi Haifa	Maccabi Tel Aviv	Maccabi Tel Aviv
2021–22 (PL, SC, TC)	Maccabi Haifa	Hapoel Be'er Sheva	Maccabi Haifa
2022–23 (PL, SC, TC)	Maccabi Haifa	Beitar Jerusalem	Maccabi Netanya
2023–24 (PL, SC, TC)	Maccabi Tel Aviv	Maccabi Petah Tikva	Maccabi Tel Aviv
2024–25 (PL, SC, TC)	Maccabi Tel Aviv	Hapoel Be'er Sheva	Maccabi Tel Aviv
2025–26 (PL, SC, TC)	Hapoel Be'er Sheva	Maccabi Tel Aviv	Beitar Jerusalem
Season	League Champions	State Cup holder	Toto Cup holder

Legend
Won all 3 titles in the same year
Won 2 titles in the same year

== Qualification for European competitions ==
Clubs who do well in either the Premier League or State Cup qualify to compete in various UEFA-organised Europe-wide competitions in the following season (as well as continuing to play in domestic competitions). The number of Israeli clubs playing in Europe in any one season can range from four to six, depending on the qualification scenarios. Currently, Israel is awarded the following places in European competitions:

Competition	Who qualifies	Notes
UEFA Champions League	Premier League champions	
UEFA Europa League	State Cup winners	If one of the top 3 teams in the Premier League also wins the State Cup, the fourth-placed team will be granted a Conference League spot.
UEFA Europa Conference League	Clubs finishing second or third in the Premier League	If the second or third-placed club has already qualified for the Conference League through the State Cup, then the fourth-placed club of the Premier League get a Conference League spot.
UEFA Europa Conference League	Any Israeli club that wins the UEFA Europa Conference League and has not already qualified for the Champions League or Europa League or Conference League	By the UEFA Europa Conference League regulations (Regulation 1.07), this club's entry into the UEFA Europa Conference League will not be at the expense of any other entries to which its national federation is entitled

In addition, once in a European competition, it becomes possible to qualify for others:

- All the losers of the UEFA Champions League Preliminary Round and First qualifying round go forward to the UEFA Europa League Second qualifying round
- All the losers of the UEFA Champions League Second qualifying round go forward to the UEFA Europa League Third qualifying round
- All the losers of the UEFA Champions League Third qualifying round go forward to the UEFA Europa League Play-off round
- All the losers of the UEFA Champions League Play-off round go forward to the UEFA Europa League Group stage.
- Any clubs playing in the UEFA Champions League that will finish third in the group stage will go into the UEFA Europa League round of 32

== Israel national team ==
Israel hosted and won the 1964 AFC Asian Cup. Israel qualified for the World Cup in 1970 which was held in Mexico. Mordechai Spiegler scored in a 1–1 draw against Sweden. Israel's Olympic football team qualified for the 1968 Summer Olympics and the 1976 Summer Olympics both times reaching the quarter-finals.

Israel's highest FIFA ranking was 15th in November 2008.

Famous matches of the Israeli football team include the 1-2 and 0-1 defeat against Iran respectively in 1968 AFC Asian Cup and 1974 Asian Games, both held in Tehran when Israel and Iran were on friendly terms, the 3–2 win in France in the 1994 World Cup qualification, which ended up disqualifying the French team from the World Cup in the United States, the defeat of Austria 5–0 in 1999 during Euro 2000 qualifications, and a 2–1 win over Argentina in a friendly match in 1998, a game played in Teddy Stadium in Jerusalem.

== History ==
=== British Mandate ===
During the British Mandate for Palestine, organised football consisted mainly of British and Jewish clubs, although Arab clubs also existed and took part in IFA competitions. As early as 1906, Maccabi Tel Aviv was formed as a social club, followed by a string of Maccabi clubs in other cities and towns, such as Jerusalem, Petah Tikva, Haifa, Zikhron Ya'akov and Hadera. On 24 April 1924, Hapoel Haifa was formed. Shortly after formation, they joined the World Maccabi Organization. The first membership cards read "Club Hapoel Sport, Cultural Organization Haifa" (A member of the World Maccabi Organization). Later, during a meeting of Hapoel labourers in Afula, it was decided to break off from the World Maccabi Organization and create the Hapoel (Labor) Organization, followed by Hapoel teams from Tel Aviv, Jerusalem, Herzliya and other cities and towns. Later, during the 1930s and the 1940s other sport organisations were formed, such as Beitar (founded by the right-wing revisionist party), Elitzur (formed by the religious Hapoel HaMizrachi party) and the short lived Hakoah 09 (formed by former members of Hakoah Vienna).

In February 1928, the first ever Tel Aviv derby took place. Maccabi won 3–0 and thus the oldest rivalry in Israel was born.

During the 1920s, and before the IFA was established, two cup competitions were held, one which acted as an unofficial national cup, which was dominated by British military teams, and one named Magen Shimshon, which was open to Maccabi clubs. In 1928 the People's Cup began. This cup would later be known as Palestine Cup and, after the Israeli Declaration of Independence, the Israel State Cup. In the first final, played in Tel Aviv two Jewish clubs, Hapoel Tel Aviv met Maccabi Hasmonean Jerusalem and won by a score of 2–0, but the cup was shared since Maccabi appealed to the newly formed IFA that Hapoel had fielded an ineligible player.

Nine teams started the first league in 1932. The first winner of the league was the British Police, who, under the guidance of Police Chief Speiser, were the best-organised club in the country; Speiser would later serve as the first chairman of the football association. The league was held inconsistently, and only 10 titles were won between 1932 and 1947, all of which, beside the first title, were one by either Maccabi Tel Aviv (4 titles) or Hapoel Tel Aviv (5 titles).

During the British Mandate period, the IFA representative team competed under the title of Eretz Israel/Palestine, operating as a virtually all-Jewish combination. The first international match was a qualifying match for the 1934 World Cup against Egypt in Cairo, which resulted in a 7–1 defeat. The second leg played in Tel Aviv, resulted in a 4–1 defeat and an 11–2 aggregate loss. Earlier, in 1931, a mixed team of Palestinians, Jews, and British police played an international match in Egypt.

During this period Jewish teams took international tours in order to promote both football in Mandatory Palestine and the Zionist cause. Such tours include Maccabi Haifa tour of the United States in 1927, Maccabi Eretz Israel tour of Australia in 1939 and Hapoel Tel Aviv tour of the US in 1947. In return, many internationally famed clubs visited Mandatory Palestine and played Jewish and British clubs. Among these clubs are Hakoah Vienna, MTK Budapest and Hajduk Split.

=== Post independence ===
Just four months after Israel gained independence, the Israeli national team travelled to New York City to play their American counterparts in a friendly at the Polo Grounds. Over 40,000 spectators witnessed the newly formed Israeli side lose to the Americans 3–1. Shmuel Ben Dror went down in history as the first goal scorer in the history of the Israeli national team.

In 1967, Hapoel Tel Aviv became the first club to win the Asian Club Championships. In the 2001–02 UEFA Cup Hapoel reached the quarter-finals after knocking out Chelsea, Lokomotiv Moscow and Parma.

The 1970s and early 1980 were dominated by Maccabi Tel Aviv, Hapoel Tel Aviv and Maccabi Netanya. During the mid-1980s under the guidance of coach Shlomo Scharf Maccabi Haifa F.C. rose to power, winning its first two championship titles. In 1992, when Israel rejoined UEFA, Maccabi Haifa was bought by businessman Ya'akov Shahar who lead European standards of high quality management in the Israeli club. This move paved the way for private ownerships of football clubs in Israel.

Successful Israeli players who also played outside Israel include Eli Ohana, Mordechai Spiegler, Giora Spiegel, Ronny Rosenthal, Avi Cohen, Eyal Berkovich, Haim Revivo, Dudu Aouate, Yossi Benayoun, Tal Ben Haim, Elyaniv Barda and Biram Kayal.

The 2000s (decade) was dominated by Maccabi Haifa F.C. who won seven out of 11 possible championship titles, and also recorded good results in European tournaments such as the UEFA Champions League and UEFA Cup.

Israeli teams have also qualified for the UEFA Champions League group stage six times: Maccabi Haifa in the 2002–03, 2009–10 and 2022-23 seasons; Maccabi Tel Aviv in the 2004–05 and 2015-16 seasons; and Hapoel Tel Aviv in the 2010–11 season.

After 2018, when Willi Ruttensteiner was appointed as technical director of the national team, a national football academy was founded, and three supporting development centers were established. As well the training of the coaches was strengthened.

== Attendances ==
The average attendance per top-flight football league season and the club with the highest average attendance:

Season	League average	Best club	Best club average
2024-25	7,798	Maccabi Haifa	22,953
2023-24	7,735	Maccabi Tel Aviv	20,356
2022-23	8,457	Maccabi Haifa	28,824
2021-22	—	—	—
2020-21	—	—	—
2019-20	7,376	Maccabi Tel Aviv	21,114
2018-19	5,964	Maccabi Haifa	15,671
2017-18	6,049	Maccabi Haifa	16,899
2016-17	6,250	Maccabi Haifa	19,752
2015-16	7,031	Maccabi Haifa	20,856
2014-15	6,710	Maccabi Haifa	23,439
2013-14	5,167	Maccabi Tel Aviv	12,030
2012-13	5,061	Maccabi Tel Aviv	11,195
2011-12	3,901	Maccabi Haifa	8,767
2010-11	4,522	Hapoel Tel Aviv	12,148
2009-10	4,146	Hapoel Tel Aviv	10,467
2008-09	5,305	Beitar Jerusalem	10,647
2007-08	5,354	Beitar Jerusalem	11,882
2006-07	4,849	Beitar Jerusalem	12,971

A study of 1,629 matches found that Israeli top-tier football games played on Shabbat attracted approximately 10% fewer spectators than other games.

== See also ==
- List of football stadiums in Israel
- Women's football in Israel
- American football in Israel
