= 2006–07 Israel State Cup =

Tournament details
- Country: Israel

Final positions
- Champions: Hapoel Tel Aviv (12th title)
- Runners-up: Hapoel Ashkelon

The 2006–07 Israel State Cup (Hebrew: גביע המדינה, Gvia HaMedina) was the 68th season of Israel's nationwide football cup competition and the 53rd after the Israeli Declaration of Independence.

The competition was won by Hapoel Tel Aviv, who have beaten Hapoel Ashkelon on penalties at the final. By winning, Hapoel Tel Aviv qualified to the second round of the UEFA Cup.

== Results ==
=== Eighth Round ===
Home team	Score	Away team
Hapoel Marmorek	2–0	Hapoel Afula
Maccabi Kiryat Gat	0–5	Ironi Kiryat Ata
Hapoel Ramat Gan	2–0	Maccabi Be'er Ya'akov
Maccabi Kafr Kanna	1–3	Hapoel Herzliya
Hapoel Bnei Tamra	1–2	Beitar Shimshon Tel Aviv
Sektzia Nes Tziona	0–1	Hapoel Bnei Jadeidi
Hapoel Azor	1–2	Maccabi Be'er Sheva
Maccabi HaShikma Ramat Hen	2–1	Hapoel Umm al-Fahm

=== Ninth Round ===
Home team	Score	Away team
Bnei Yehuda	1–2	Hapoel Kfar Saba
Hapoel Tel Aviv	3–0	Hapoel Jerusalem
Ironi Nir Ramat HaSharon	0–1	Maccabi Petah Tikva
Beitar Shimshon Tel Aviv	3–3 (a.e.t.) (1–3 p.)	Hapoel Marmorek
Hapoel Ramat Gan	1–0 (a.e.t.)	Hapoel Ra'anana
Maccabi HaShikma Ramat Hen	0–0 (a.e.t.) (3–2 p.)	Hapoel Bnei Jadeidi
Hapoel Nazareth Illit	2–0	Ironi Kiryat Shmona
Hapoel Bnei Lod	3–2 (a.e.t.)	Maccabi Ahi Nazareth
Hapoel Petah Tikva	0–2	Hapoel Herzliya
Hapoel Haifa	3–0	Maccabi Be'er Sheva
Hapoel Ashkelon	2–0	Hapoel Be'er Sheva
Maccabi Tel Aviv	2–1 (a.e.t.)	Hakoah Amidar Ramat Gan
Maccabi Netanya	1–2 (a.e.t.)	Bnei Sakhnin
F.C. Ashdod	3–2	Ironi Kiryat Ata
Hapoel Acre	1–1 (a.e.t.) (3–1 p.)	Maccabi Herzliya
Maccabi Haifa	1–1 (a.e.t.) (4–3 p.)	Beitar Jerusalem

=== Round of 16 ===
20 April 2007	Hapoel Haifa	2–1	Hapoel Acre	Kiryat Eliezer Stadium
16:00	Moshe 36'; Avidor 64'	Report (in Hebrew)	Weizman 86'	Referee: Bohbot

21 April 2007	Hapoel Marmorek	0–1	Hapoel Tel Aviv	Hapoel Marmorek ground
15:00		Report (in Hebrew)	Ogbonna 87'	Referee: Shitrit

21 April 2007	Maccabi HaShikma Ramat Hen	0–2	Hapoel Ashkelon	Ramat HaShikma ground
16:00		Report (in Hebrew)	Nachum 25'; Zohar 90'	Referee: Bar Natan

21 April 2007	Maccabi Haifa	2–1 (a.e.t.)	Bnei Lod	Kiryat Eliezer Stadium
17:30	Colautti 100'; Katan 118'	Report (in Hebrew)	Saba'a 118'	Referee: Hachmon

21 April 2007	Hapoel Nazareth Illit	0–1	F.C. Ashdod	Green Stadium
18:00		Report (in Hebrew)	Shriki 42'	Referee: Tabrizi

21 April 2007	Hapoel Kfar Saba	1–1 (a.e.t.) (2–3 p)	Hapoel Ramat Gan	Levita Stadium
18:30	Menashe 36' (pen.)	Report (in Hebrew)	Aburemech 9'	Referee: Prost
	Penalties
	Nissim (penalty missed); Menashe (penalty missed); Halfon (penalty scored); Dayan (penalty scored) da Silva (penalty missed)		(penalty missed) Bernstein; (penalty scored) Hassan; (penalty scored) Levi; (penalty scored) Aburemech

21 April 2007	Maccabi Petah Tikva	1–0	Hapoel Herzliya	Petah Tikva Municipal Stadium
18:30	Damari 70'	Report (in Hebrew)		Referee: Mashiah

21 April 2007	Bnei Sakhnin	2–1 (a.e.t.)	Maccabi Tel Aviv	Doha Stadium
20:00	Kadousi 94'; Vilner 118'	Report (in Hebrew)	Roso 120'	Referee: Levi

=== Quarter-finals ===
1 May 2007	Hapoel Ramat Gan	1–0 (a.e.t.)	Maccabi Haifa	HaMakhtesh Stadium
16:15	Hassan 115'	Report (in Hebrew)		Referee: Keinan

1 May 2007	Hapoel Ashkelon	2–0	Hapoel Haifa	Sala Stadium
17:00	Sangoy 2'; Shen 58'	Report (in Hebrew)		Referee: Mashiah

1 May 2007	Maccabi Petah Tikva	0–4	F.C. Ashdod	Petah Tikva Municipal Stadium
18:30		Report (in Hebrew)	Holtzman 49', 77'; Checkol 60'; Azran 70'	Referee: Levi

1 May 2007	Hapoel Tel Aviv	3–0	Bnei Sakhnin	Bloomfield Stadium
19:00	Tuama 46'; Barda 82', 83'	Report (in Hebrew)		Referee: Ya'akov

=== Semi-finals ===
9 May 2007
17:45

Hapoel Ashkelon	1–0	Hapoel Ramat Gan
Emangoa 24'	Report (in Hebrew)

Ramat Gan Stadium
Referee: Liani

9 May 2007
20:45

Hapoel Tel Aviv	1–0	F.C. Ashdod
Hen 4'	Report (in Hebrew)

Ramat Gan Stadium
Referee: Tabrizi

=== Final ===
16 May 2007
20:50

Hapoel Ashkelon	1–1 (a.e.t.)	Hapoel Tel Aviv
Nachum 7'	Report (in Hebrew)	De Bruno 74'
Penalties
Sangoy (penalty scored); Shkuri (penalty scored); Ben-Sa'adon (penalty scored); Elkayam (penalty scored); Zohar (penalty missed)	4–5	(penalty scored) Badir; (penalty scored) De Bruno; (penalty scored) Tuama; (penalty scored) Antebi; (penalty scored) Páez

Ramat Gan Stadium
Referee: Keinan
