= Ronny Levy =

Israeli football manager and former player (born 1966)

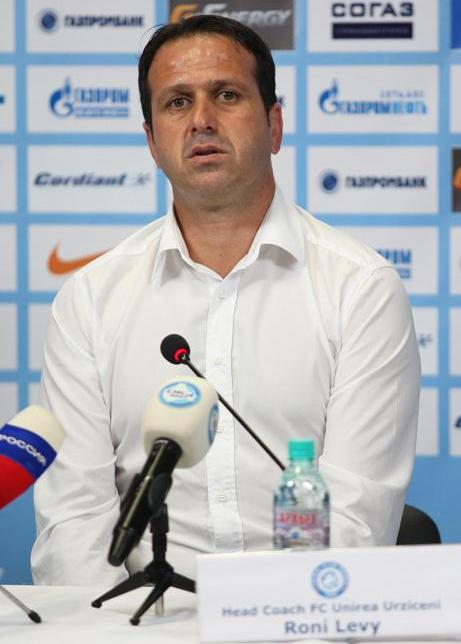

Personal information
- Date of birth: 14 November 1966 (age 59)
- Place of birth: Netanya, Israel
- Position: Defensive midfielder

Team information
- Current team: Maccabi Netanya (Manager)

Youth career
- Maccabi Netanya

Senior career*
Years	Team	Apps	(Gls)
1985–1992	Maccabi Netanya	156	(12)
1990–1991	→ Bnei Yehuda (loan)	20	(3)
1992–1997	Maccabi Haifa	144	(18)

International career
1993–1995	Israel	16	(0)

Managerial career
- 1999–2000: Maccabi Haifa (assistant)
- 2000: Maccabi Haifa (caretaker)
- 2000–2003: Maccabi Haifa (youth)
- 2003–2008: Maccabi Haifa
- 2008–2009: Maccabi Petah Tikva
- 2009–2010: Unirea Urziceni
- 2010–2011: Beitar Jerusalem
- 2011: Steaua București
- 2011–2013: Anorthosis Famagusta
- 2013–2014: Beitar Jerusalem
- 2015: Maccabi Netanya
- 2015–2016: Maccabi Haifa
- 2016–2018: Anorthosis Famagusta
- 2019–2020: Beitar Jerusalem
- 2021–2022: Hapoel Be'er Sheva
- 2022–2025: Hapoel Haifa
- 2026–: Maccabi Netanya
- * Club domestic league appearances and goals

Ronny Levy (Hebrew: רוני לוי; also spelled Roni; born on 14 November 1966), is an Israeli football manager. As an Israeli international player, Levy played primarily as a defensive midfielder. He won Israeli football championships with both Bnei Yehuda and Maccabi Haifa.

== Club career ==
Levy started his career as a striker in the youth team of Maccabi Netanya. He was promoted to the first team in 1985. After five seasons, he was loaned to Bnei Yehuda where he won his first championship title.

After returning to Maccabi Netanya, Levy transferred to Maccabi Haifa in 1992, where he played as a defender. After a few games, his role was changed to defensive midfielder, the position he would occupy until the end of his playing career. He retired from playing in 1997 due to a serious knee injury.

== International career ==
Levy earned sixteen international caps with the Israel national team.

== Managerial career ==
As the season of 2002–03 ended, Levy returned to be first team manager. Levy won three domestic championships in a row in his first three years of managing Maccabi Haifa (2003–04, 2004–05, 2005–06), one Toto Cup Al (2006), and a qualification to the UEFA cup group stage in 2006–07.

In 2006, Levy received a "manager of the year" award from both major Israeli newspapers, Yedioth Ahronoth and Maariv. After seasons 2006–07 and 2007–08.

Levy then signed with Maccabi Petah Tikva for a year and a half. After less than a year there, Levy resigned.

On 31 December 2009, Levy signed a year and a half contract, worth $600,000, to manage Unirea Urziceni. His first game on 18 February 2010 was against Liverpool at Anfield in the UEFA Europa League, where the visitors lost 1–0.

On 17 January 2011, Levy signed for Beitar Jerusalem. On 10 June 2011, Steaua Bucharest presented Ronny Levy as the new head coach of the team. He was fired on 30 September 2011 after a draw against AEK Larnaca in the UEFA Europa League. The next day, 1 October, he signed a year contract with Anorthosis Famagusta.

On 6 December 2013, Levy made his return to Beitar Jerusalem. On 14 January 2015, Levy signed with Maccabi Netanya. On 18 May 2015, Levy returned to Maccabi Haifa, signing a three-year contract. On 26 October 2016, Levy made his return to Anorthosis Famagusta after signing an 18-month contract. He left the club in September 2018.

== Honours ==
=== As player ===
- Israeli Premier League (2):
  - 1989–90, 1993–94
- Israel State Cup (2):
  - 1993, 1995
- Toto Cup (1):
  - 1993–94

=== As manager ===
- Israeli Youth Championship (1):
  - 2002–03
- Youth State Cup (1):
  - 2003
- Israeli Premier League (3):
  - 2003–04, 2004–05, 2005–06
- Toto Cup (3):
  - 2005–06, 2007–08, 2019
- Liga I:
  - Runners-up (1): 2009–10
- Israel State Cup (1):
  - 2016
