= 2004–05 Toto Cup Al =

Toto Cup Al
- Season: 2004–05
- Champions: Hapoel Petah Tikva (4th title)

The 2004–05 Toto Cup Al was the 21st season of the third most important football tournament in Israel since its introduction. This was the first edition to be played with clubs of the Israeli Premier League, after 5 seasons of joint competition with Israeli Premier League and Liga Leumit clubs.

The competition began on 6 August 2004 and ended on 6 April 2005, with Hapoel Petah Tikva beating F.C. Ashdod 4–2 on penalties after 3–3 in the final.

== Format ==
The 12 Israeli Premier League clubs were split into three groups, each with 4 clubs. The two top clubs in each group, along with the two best third-placed clubs, advanced to the semi-finals.

== Group stage ==
The matches were played from 6 August to 15 December 2004.

=== Group A ===
Pos	Team	Pld	W	D	L	GF	GA	GD	Pts	HPT	MHA	BEI	HHA
1	Hapoel Petah Tikva (A)	6	3	3	0	9	3	+6	12		5–1	0–0	1–0
2	Maccabi Haifa (A)	6	3	2	1	9	7	+2	11	0–0		2–1	4–0
3	Beitar Jerusalem (A)	6	2	3	1	7	4	+3	9	1–1	1–1		3–0
4	Hapoel Haifa	6	0	0	6	1	12	−11	0	1–2	0–1	0–1	

Source: Israel Toto Cup 2004/05
Rules for classification: 1st points; 2nd goal difference; 3rd matches won; 4th goals scored; 5th head-to-head; 6th decision match
(A) Advanced to quarter-finals

=== Group B ===
Pos	Team	Pld	W	D	L	GF	GA	GD	Pts	ASH	MTA	BnS	HNI
1	F.C. Ironi Ashdod (A)	6	4	1	1	13	8	+5	13		0–4	3–1	1–0
2	Maccabi Tel Aviv (A)	6	3	1	2	12	7	+5	10	2–2		2–0	4–0
3	Bnei Sakhnin (A)	6	3	0	3	8	11	−3	9	1–6	3–0		2–0
4	Hapoel Nazareth Illit	6	1	0	5	2	9	−7	3	0–1	2–0	0–1	

Source: Israel Toto Cup 2004/05
Rules for classification: 1st points; 2nd goal difference; 3rd matches won; 4th goals scored; 5th head-to-head; 6th decision match
(A) Advanced to quarter-finals

=== Group C ===
Pos	Team	Pld	W	D	L	GF	GA	GD	Pts	BnY	HTA	HBS	MPT
1	Bnei Yehuda (A)	6	3	3	0	10	6	+4	12		1–0	3–1	1–1
2	Hapoel Tel Aviv (A)	6	2	2	2	9	6	+3	8	2–2		1–0	0–0
3	Hapoel Be'er Sheva	6	1	2	3	5	8	−3	5	1–2	3–2		0–0
4	Maccabi Petah Tikva	6	0	5	1	2	6	−4	5	1–1	0–4	0–0	

Source: Israel Toto Cup 2004/05
Rules for classification: 1st points; 2nd goal difference; 3rd matches won; 4th goals scored; 5th head-to-head; 6th decision match
(A) Advanced to quarter-finals

== Elimination rounds ==
=== Quarter-finals ===
5 January 2005	Beitar Jerusalem	0–3	Hapoel Petah Tikva	Jerusalem
		Report (in Hebrew)	Bento 14' (o.g.); Yavuryan 29'; Buchsenbaum 90'	Stadium: Teddy Stadium

5 January 2005	Maccabi Haifa	4–1	Maccabi Tel Aviv	Haifa
	Colautti 20', 48'; Katan 52'; Barda 89'	Report (in Hebrew)	Haim 40'	Stadium: Kiryat Eliezer Stadium; Referee: Eran Prost

18 January 2005	Bnei Sakhnin	0–2	F.C. Ashdod	Ilut
		Report (in Hebrew)	Azran 54'; Shriki 85'	Stadium: Ilut Stadium

18 January 2005	Hapoel Tel Aviv	0–3	Bnei Yehuda	Tel Aviv
		Report (in Hebrew)	Lima 5'; Abarbanel 55'; Biton 62'	Stadium: Bloomfield Stadium

=== Semi-finals ===
16 February 2005	Maccabi Haifa	1–5	Hapoel Petah Tikva	Ramat Gan
17:30	Barda 9'	Report (in Hebrew)	Haimovich 20'; Yavuryan 40', 51'; Arbeitman 73'; Mozgovoy 85'	Stadium: Ramat Gan Stadium

16 February 2005	F.C. Ashdod	2–0 (a.e.t.)	Bnei Yehuda	Ramat Gan
20:00	Tubul 93'; Turjeman 114'	Report (in Hebrew)		Stadium: Ramat Gan Stadium

=== Final ===
6 April 2005
19:00

Hapoel Petah Tikva	3–3 (a.e.t.)	F.C. Ashdod
Yehiel 39', 97'; Hassan 62'	Report (in Hebrew)	Azran 50', 76'; Ohayon 103'
Penalties
Shivon (penalty missed); Yehiel (penalty scored); Haimovich (penalty scored); Jukan (penalty scored); Keisi (penalty scored)	4–2	(penalty missed) Holtzman; (penalty scored) Ohayon; (penalty scored) Zohar; (penalty missed) Azran

Ramat Gan Stadium

== See also ==
- 2004–05 Toto Cup Leumit
- 2004–05 Toto Cup Artzit
