= 2008–09 Toto Cup Al =

Tournament details
- Country: Israel
- Teams: 12

Final positions
- Champions: Maccabi Tel Aviv (3rd title)
- Runners-up: F.C. Ashdod

Tournament statistics
- Matches played: 46
- Goals scored: 125 (2.72 per match)
- Top goal scorer(s): (Armenia) Yeghia Yavruyan (Israel) Yuval Avidor (5)

The 2008–09 Toto Cup Al was the twenty-seventh season of the third most important football tournament in Israel since its introduction and fifth under the current format. It was held in two stages. First, twelve Premier League teams were divided into three groups. The winners and runners-up, as well as two best third placed teams from each group, advanced to the Quarterfinals. Quarterfinals and Semifinals were held as two-legged matches, while the Final was one-legged match held at Ramat Gan Stadium. The defending champions were Maccabi Haifa. Maccabi Tel Aviv won the 2008–09 Toto Cup Al making it their third Toto Cup title overall.

== Group stage ==
The matches were played from August 8 to November 12, 2008.

=== Group A ===
Pos	Team	Pld	W	D	L	GF	GA	GD	Pts	MHA	BnY	MNE	BEI
1	Maccabi Haifa (A)	6	3	3	0	12	5	+7	12		1–1	1–1	1–1
2	Bnei Yehuda (A)	6	3	1	2	10	10	0	10	1–3		3–0	3–2
3	Maccabi Netanya (A)	6	2	1	3	6	10	−4	7	1–4	1–2		1–0
4	Beitar Jerusalem	6	1	1	4	6	9	−3	4	0–2	3–0	0–2	

Source: football.org.il (in Hebrew)
Rules for classification: 1st points; 2nd goal difference; 3rd matches won; 4th goals scored; 5th head-to-head; 6th decision match
(A) Advanced to the quarterfinals

=== Group B ===
Pos	Team	Pld	W	D	L	GF	GA	GD	Pts	ASH	MTA	HAR	MPT
1	F.C. Ironi Ashdod (A)	6	3	2	1	7	5	+2	11		1–1	0–1	2–1
2	Maccabi Tel Aviv (A)	6	2	2	2	9	7	+2	8	1–2		1–0	1–2
3	Hakoah Amidar Ramat Gan	6	1	3	2	5	6	−1	6	0–1	2–2		1–1
4	Maccabi Petah Tikva	6	1	3	2	6	9	−3	6	1–1	0–3	1–1	

Source: football.org.il (in Hebrew)
Rules for classification: 1st points; 2nd goal difference; 3rd matches won; 4th goals scored; 5th head-to-head; 6th decision match
(A) Advanced to the quarterfinals

=== Group C ===
Pos	Team	Pld	W	D	L	GF	GA	GD	Pts	HTA	BnS	IKS	HPT
1	Hapoel Tel Aviv (A)	6	3	2	1	17	9	+8	11		7–2	4–3	0–0
2	Bnei Sakhnin (A)	6	3	1	2	8	14	−6	10	0–4		2–1	1–1
3	Ironi Kiryat Shmona (A)	6	2	1	3	9	10	−1	7	1–1	0–1		2–1
4	Hapoel Petah Tikva	6	1	2	3	7	8	−1	5	3–1	1–2	1–2	

Source: football.org.il (in Hebrew)
Rules for classification: 1st points; 2nd goal difference; 3rd matches won; 4th goals scored; 5th head-to-head; 6th decision match
(A) Advanced to the quarterfinals

== Elimination rounds ==
=== Quarterfinals ===
The first legs were played on January 5 and 6, 2009 while the second legs were played on January 13 and 14, 2009.

Team 1	Agg.	Team 2	1st leg	2nd leg
Maccabi Netanya	1–5	F.C. Ashdod	1–4	0–1
Bnei Yehuda	2–2 (a)	Maccabi Tel Aviv	2–1	0–1
Hapoel Tel Aviv	2–2 (p. 4–3)	Maccabi Haifa	2–0	0–2 (aet)

The first game between Ironi Kiryat Shmona and Bnei Sakhnin (that should have been played in Kiryat Shmona) has been cancelled due to safety reasons during the 2008–2009 Israel–Gaza conflict. The tie was eventually played as one-legged match on a neutral ground (Ramat Gan Stadium, Ramat Gan) on January 20, 2009.

Team 1	Score	Team 2
Ironi Kiryat Shmona	1–2	Bnei Sakhnin

=== Semifinals ===
2009-01-28
17:30

Bnei Sakhnin	0–4	F.C. Ashdod
	Report	Lavi 24'; Shriki 28'; Zohar 51'; Revivo 57'

Ramat Gan Stadium, Ramat Gan
Referee: Liran Liani

2009-01-28
20:15

Maccabi Tel Aviv	1–0	Hapoel Tel Aviv
Mayuka 14'	Report

Ramat Gan Stadium, Ramat Gan
Referee: Eytan Tbryzy

=== Final ===
2009-02-04
20:00

Maccabi Tel Aviv	1–0	F.C. Ashdod
Shivhon 60'	Report

Ramat Gan Stadium, Ramat Gan
Attendance: 8,246
Referee: Moshe Bohbot

== See also ==
- 2008–09 Israeli Premier League
- 2008–09 Israel State Cup
