= 2005–06 Toto Cup Al =

Final positions
- Champions: Maccabi Haifa (4th title)
- Runners-up: Ashdod

The 2005–06 Toto Cup Al was the 22nd season of the third most important football tournament in Israel since its introduction and the second edition to be played with clubs of the Israeli Premier League only.

The competition was held in two stages. First, the 12 Premier League teams were divided into two groups. The group winners and runners-up advanced to the semi-finals, which, as was the final, were held as one-legged matches.

The competition was won by Maccabi Haifa who had beaten F.C. Ashdod 3–0 in the final.

== Group stage ==
=== Group A ===
Pos	Team	Pld	W	D	L	GF	GA	GD	Pts	MHA	ASH	HKS	MNE	MPT	BnS
1	Maccabi Haifa (A)	10	7	1	2	20	9	+11	22		3–1	1–0	3–1	0–0	2–0
2	F.C. Ironi Ashdod (A)	10	5	2	3	19	19	0	17	0–3		3–1	2–1	2–1	3–1
3	Hapoel Kfar Saba	10	4	2	4	14	10	+4	14	2–0	2–2		3–0	2–2	1–0
4	Maccabi Netanya	10	4	2	4	12	13	−1	14	3–1	3–1	3–0		3–1	2–0
5	Maccabi Petah Tikva	10	3	4	3	12	12	0	13	0–3	2–2	1–0	2–0		3–0
6	Bnei Sakhnin	10	0	3	7	7	21	−14	3	2–4	3–4	0–3	0–0	0–0	

Source: one.co.il Maccabi Tel Aviv (in Hebrew)
Rules for classification: 1st points; 2nd goal difference; 3rd matches won; 4th goals scored; 5th head-to-head; 6th decision match
(A) Advanced to the Semifinals

=== Group B ===
Pos	Team	Pld	W	D	L	GF	GA	GD	Pts	HTA	MTA	HNI	BnY	HPT	BEI
1	Hapoel Tel Aviv (A)	10	6	1	3	20	6	+14	19		3–0	1–2	1–1	1–0	4–1
2	Maccabi Tel Aviv (A)	10	5	1	4	12	13	−1	16	0–3		1–1	2–3	2–1	4–1
3	Hapoel Nazareth Illit	10	4	3	3	9	8	+1	15	1–0	0–1		0–0	0–1	3–2
4	Bnei Yehuda	10	4	3	3	11	14	−3	15	0–5	1–0	1–0		2–2	3–1
5	Hapoel Petah Tikva	10	4	2	4	10	9	+1	14	0–2	0–1	0–0	2–0		2–1
6	Beitar Jerusalem	10	2	0	8	9	21	−12	6	1–0	0–1	1–2	1–0	0–2	

Source: one.co.il Maccabi Tel Aviv (in Hebrew)
Rules for classification: 1st points; 2nd goal difference; 3rd matches won; 4th goals scored; 5th head-to-head; 6th decision match
(A) Advanced to the Semifinals

== Elimination rounds ==
=== Semifinals ===
15 February 2006	Maccabi Tel Aviv	2–4	F.C. Ashdod	Ramat Gan
16:00	Duarte 2', 28'	Report (in Hebrew)	Ohayon 11'; Holtzman 27' (pen.); Kaku 45'; Shriki 80'	Stadium: Ramat Gan Stadium; Attendance: 1000

15 February 2006	Maccabi Haifa	1–0	Hapoel Tel Aviv	Ramat Gan
18:15	Tal 38'	Report (in Hebrew)		Stadium: Ramat Gan Stadium; Referee: Eitan Tabrizi

=== Final ===
15 March 2006

Maccabi Haifa	3–0	F.C. Ashdod
Arbeitman 11'; Colautti 18'; Hemed 90'	Report (in Hebrew)

Ramat Gan Stadium
Referee: Meir Levi

== See also ==
- 2005–06 Toto Cup Leumit
- 2005–06 Toto Cup Artzit
