= Ibezito Ogbonna =

Nigerian footballer

Ibe Zito Ogbonna
Personal information
- Full name: Ibe Zito Ogbonna
- Date of birth: 27 March 1983 (age 43)
- Place of birth: Sokoto, Nigeria
- Height: 1.86 m (6 ft 1 in)
- Position: Striker

Senior career*
Years	Team	Apps	(Gls)
1998–2000	Enugu Rangers		
2000–2002	Nigerdock		
2002–2003	Sharks		
2003–2007	Hapoel Tel Aviv	117	(37)
2007–2008	CFR Cluj	2	(0)
2008–2009	Kaizer Chiefs	11	(4)
2009–2010	Apolonia Fier	6	(0)
2010–2011	EGS Gafsa	10	(2)
2011	Atyrau	11	(2)
2012	Vardar Skopje	12	(2)
2013–2014	Enyimba		
2017–2018	Agudat Sport Ashdod		
Total		169	(47)

International career
2006–2007	Nigeria U23		
- * Club domestic league appearances and goals as of 1 June 2018

Ibe Zito Ogbonna // (born on 27 March 1983, in Sokoto, Nigeria) is a former Nigerian football player who lives in Ashdod, Israel.

== Club career ==
Ogbonna was born on 27 March 1983, in Sokoto, Nigeria and began playing football in 1998 at Enugu Rangers. Subsequently, he moved for two years to Nigerdock and then played one year for Sharks.

In 2003, Ogbonna joined Hapoel Tel Aviv in the Israeli Premier League, scoring 11 league goals in his first season. He also made his debut in European competitions by playing in both legs of the 1–0 aggregate loss to Gaziantepspor in the first round of the 2003–04 UEFA Cup. In the 2005–06 season, Ogbonna scored nine goals which helped Hapoel finish runner-up in the league and won the Israel State Cup. In the following season he won another State Cup with the club. Ogbonna also made eight appearances in the 2006–07 UEFA Cup campaign, as Hapoel got past Domžale and Glasgow Rangers, with him netting a goal against the first, reaching the group stage where he scored once in a 2–2 draw against Rapid București.

In June 2007, Ogbonna was transferred to CFR Cluj in Romania, with coach Ioan Andone describing him:"Special force. He has to work on his physical training. He hits equally well with the left and the right". Because of his physique he was compared to the boxer Mike Tyson. He made his Liga I debut on 1 August when coach Andone sent him in the 86th minute to replace Eugen Trică in a 1–0 away win over Oțelul Galați. His following appearance was when he replaced Emmanuel Culio in the 84th minute of a 2–2 draw against Politehnica Timișoara. Afterwards he got injured and did not make any further appearances until the end of the season as CFR won The Double, marking the first trophies in the club's history..

In the following years, Ogbonna played for clubs from various countries, first at South African Premiership side Kaizer Chiefs. Subsequently, he went to Albanian club, Apolonia Fier and then signed for Tunisia's EGS Gafsa. His next spell was at Atyrau in the Kazakhstan Premier League. In the 2011–12 Macedonian First Football League season, he won the title with Vardar Skopje, contributing with two goals scored in 12 matches.

Ogbonna relocated to Israel in 2017, ending his career at Agudat Sport Ashdod in the fourth league.

== International career ==
Ogbonna played for Nigeria under-23 during the 2008 Summer Olympics qualifiers, but was not part of the squad that went to the final tournament.

== Personal life ==
Ogbonna is a fan of hip-hop music, appreciating artists such as 50 Cent, Tupac Shakur and Jay-Z. One of his brothers was a footballer in Nigeria. His favorite footballer is Zinedine Zidane, and he is a fan of AC Milan and Real Madrid.

In May 2021, Ogbonna's apartment from Ashdod, where he was living with his wife and two daughters, was hit by a missile fired from Gaza. He was hospitalized following minor injuries, saying:"I am extremely lucky to be alive after this rocket was fired and it's third time lucky for me after being involved in a car crash and a horrible robbery incident in Nigeria".

== Honours ==
Hapoel Tel Aviv

- Israeli Premier League runner-up: 2005–06
- Israel State Cup: 2005–06, 2006–07

CFR Cluj

- Liga I: 2007–08
- Cupa României: 2007–08

Vardar Skopje

- First Macedonian Football League: 2011–12
