= Elyaniv Barda =

Israeli footballer (born 1981)

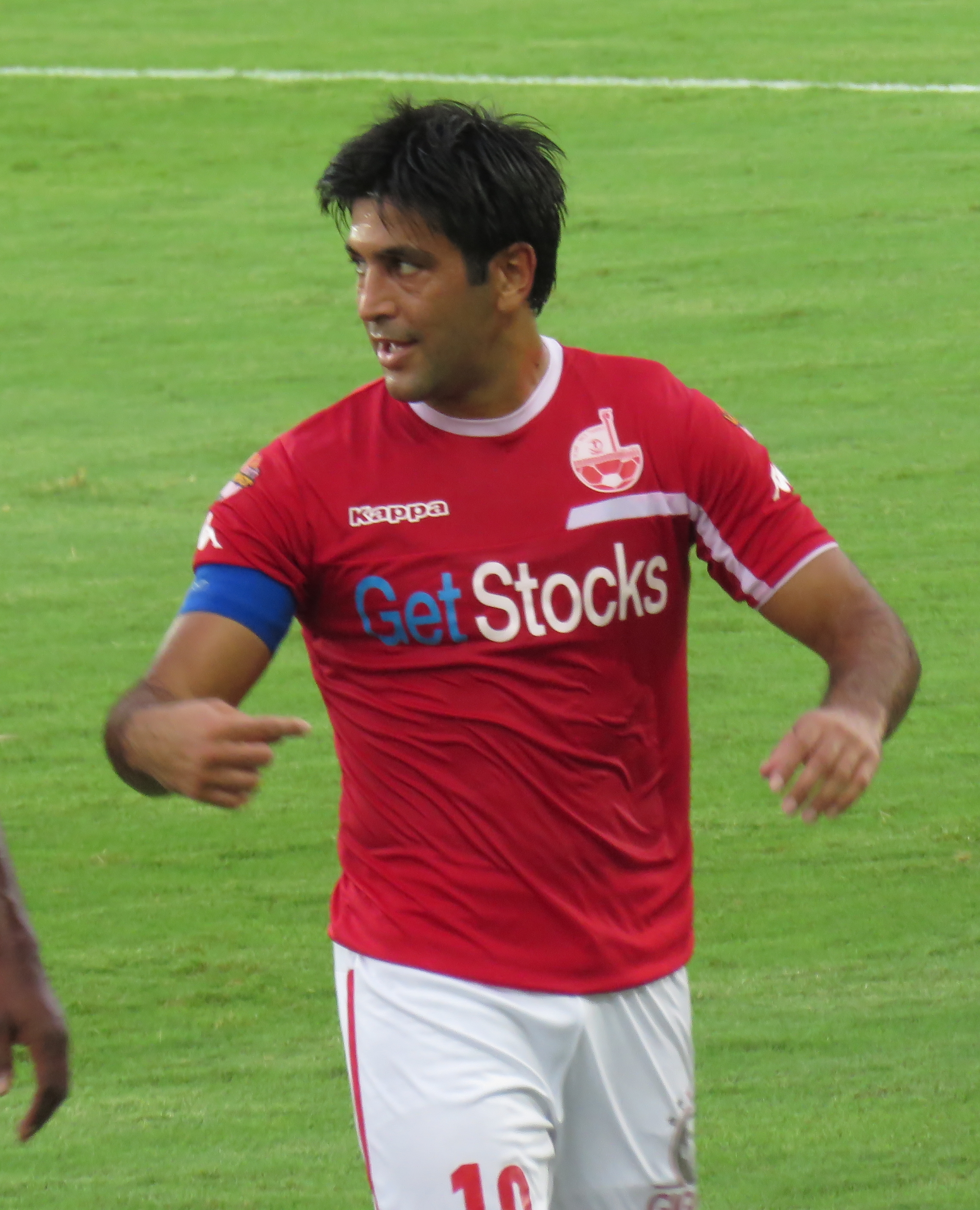
- Barda playing for Hapoel Be'er Sheva in 2015

Personal information
- Full name: Elyaniv Felix Barda
- Date of birth: 15 December 1981 (age 44)
- Place of birth: Be'er Sheva, Israel
- Height: 1.78 m (5 ft 10 in)
- Positions: Striker; winger

Youth career
- Hapoel Be'er Sheva

Senior career*
Years	Team	Apps	(Gls)
1998–2002	Hapoel Be'er Sheva	78	(19)
2003–2005	Maccabi Haifa	57	(12)
2005–2007	Hapoel Tel Aviv	61	(28)
2007–2013	Genk	165	(57)
2013–2018	Hapoel Be'er Sheva	92	(28)
Total		453	(133)

International career
2001–2003	Israel U21	17	(3)
2007–2016	Israel	38	(12)

Managerial career
- 2022–2024: Hapoel Be'er Sheva
- 2024–: Hapoel Tel Aviv
- * Club domestic league appearances and goals

Elyaniv Barda (or Elianiv, Hebrew: אליניב ברדה; born 15 December 1981) is an Israeli former football player, and the current manager of Hapoel Tel Aviv. His former clubs include Hapoel Be'er Sheva, Maccabi Haifa, Hapoel Tel Aviv and Belgian side Racing Genk, with whom he won four trophies during a successful six-year spell. Barda is considered by many to be Hapoel Be'er Sheva’s greatest player of all time.

== Early life ==
Barda was born in Beer Sheva, Israel, to a Tunisian-Jewish family.

== Club career ==
=== Hapoel Be'er Sheva ===
Barda began through the youth ranks of his hometown team, Hapoel Be'er Sheva, and then the first team. Between 1998 and 2002, which included seasons in both the Israeli Premier League and the second division, he scored 19 goals in 78 matches.

=== Maccabi Haifa ===
In 2003, Barda was sold to Israeli champions Maccabi Haifa despite the promises made by the club's owners to not sell him. At Maccabi Haifa, Barda played in the championship winning teams of 2003–04 and 2004–05. In two seasons at Maccabi Haifa, the forward scored 12 goals in 63 appearances.

=== Hapoel Tel Aviv ===
On the eve of the 2005–06 Israeli season, Barda, along with Haifa teammate Walid Badir, was signed by Hapoel Tel Aviv. Barda played 62 matches for Hapoel Tel Aviv, scoring on 17 occasions. He also scored 3 goals in Hapoel's successful 2006–07 UEFA Cup campaign, where the Israeli team progressed past the group stages. Barda won silverware at Hapoel when he was a member of two Israel State Cup winning sides; in the 2005–06 season and the 2006–07 season.

=== Racing Genk ===
On 22 June 2007, Barda was signed by Belgian side Racing Genk on a three-year contract, with the transfer fee believed to be in the region of €90,000. He had earlier failed to agree a move to Cypriot club APOEL F.C. In his first season at Genk in 2007/08, he scored 16 goals in 32 appearances, finishing as the second highest goalscorer in the league. This included a hat-trick against Zulte-Waregem in a 5–2 victory.

Barda, known for his versatility and pace in the early stages of his career in Belgium, was often employed as a lone striker in his first season at Genk, linking up well with midfield but still scoring and assisting to goals.

On 6 January 2009, despite interest from Scottish club Celtic, and Dutch clubs FC Twente and SC Heerenveen, the Israeli forward signed a new four-and-a-half-year deal that would keep him at Genk until June 2013.

Barda's second season at Genk was marred by injuries. He featured in just 25 league matches and contributed 5 league goals, plus another goal during the semi-finals of the Belgian Cup. On 23 May 2009, Genk defeated K.V. Mechelen 2–0 in the Cup final, securing a berth in the play-off round of the UEFA Europa League 2009–10. In this match, Barda provided the assist for the first goal of the match.

The coming of age of young attacking players such as Jelle Vossen, Christian Benteke and Kevin De Bruyne, as well as the expensive purchase of the popular Genk-born Benji De Ceulaer saw Barda increasingly being used as a substitute during the final two years of his Genk career. However, he remained an influential figure on the pitch, often scoring important goals when coming off the bench and tilting the momentum in Genk's favour because of his intelligent and determined playing style.

On 21 May 2013, Genk announced that negotiations with the player would not continue after both parties failed to agree terms on a contract extension.

During six years at the club, Barda made 196 appearances in all club competitions, scored 67 goals and provided 50 assists. He also holds Genk's record for most goals scored by a foreign player.

=== Return to Hapoel Be'er Sheva ===
After his spell in Belgium, Barda returned to Israel. On 25 June 2013 he signed a three-year contract at his hometown club Hapoel Be'er Sheva, where he started his professional career. He signed for Be’er Sheva just months after the team managed to avoid relegation in the final game of the season. His comeback to his childhood team is considered remarkable and historic, and it completely changed Hapoel Be’er Sheva's history. Barda was a key player in his first 2 seasons, Scored 18 league goals and paced the way for high-profile players to join Be’er Sheva, but saw his team finish 2nd and 3rd between 2013 and 2015.

In the 2015/16 season he scored 14 league goals and finished as his team's top scorer as Be’er Sheva celebrated their first league winning campaign in 40 years. Consequently, Barda was selected as the 2015/16 player of the season in the Israeli Premier League. Barda had a less successful 2016/17 season despite scoring a few important goals, and ended the season with 5 goals.

In November 2017, Barda suffered a heart attack during a training session. The club's physiotherapist saved his life, but Elyaniv was forced to retire. He came on as a substitute in the 90th minute on the final day of the season, Making his last appearance ever in a 6–0 win against Maccabi Netanya that marked the end of Be’er Sheva's 3rd consecutive title-winning season.

== International career ==
Barda scored three times in 17 matches for the Israel U21 team between 2001 and 2003. On 17 November 2007, he scored the opening goal in Israel's win against Russia, a goal that could have saved England's UEFA Euro 2008 qualifying campaign if England beat or even drew with Croatia on 21 November 2007, but England lost the match 2–3, meaning they did not qualify. On 21 November 2007, he scored his second goal for Israel in their 1–0 win against Macedonia. He made his debut for Israel on 24 March 2007 in the Euro 2008 Qualifier against England (0–0).

== Managerial career ==
Since joining Hapoel Be’er Sheva for the 2nd time in 2013, Barda spoke a few times about the possibility of becoming a director of football after he hangs up his boots. After his retirement, Elyaniv had various responsibilities in the club, ranging from scouting to supervising Be’er Sheva's academy and its partnership with Atlético Madrid. Elyaniv was also an assistant coach and a caretaker manager in the 2020/2021 season. At the start of the 2021/2022 season, Barda officially became Director of Football.

After Be’er Sheva's coach at the time, Ronny Levi, was fired he was replaced by Barda who was supposed to be a temporary manager until the end of the season. However, due to the team's improved performance, and mostly due to winning the 2021/2022 Israeli State Cup, Barda's job became permanent in the summer of 2022. Since then Hapoel Be’er Sheva won the 2022 Israeli Super Cup against Maccabi Haifa, who Be’er Sheva won the cup against the season prior. Barda's Be’er Sheva also qualified for the 2022/2023 conference League group stage.

== Career statistics ==
=== Club ===
(correct as of 9 July 2015)

Appearances and goals by club, season and competition
Club	Season	League			National cup			League cup			Europe			Total		
Club	Season	Apps	Goals	Assists	Apps	Goals	Assists	Apps	Goals	Assists	Apps	Goals	Assists	Apps	Goals	Assists
Hapoel Be'er Sheva	2001–02	25	4	5	0	0	0	2	0	0	0	0	0	27	4	5
Hapoel Be'er Sheva	2002–03	11	0	0	0	0	0	2	1	0	0	0	0	13	1	0
Maccabi Haifa	2002–03	14	3	1	1	0	0	3	1	1	0	0	0	18	4	2
Maccabi Haifa	2003–04	28	5	0	2	1	0	8	2	1	4	0	0	42	7	1
Maccabi Haifa	2004–05	15	4	0	2	0	1	8	1	2	1	0	0	26	5	3
Hapoel Tel Aviv	2005–06	32	7	9	0	0	0	9	3	1	0	0	0	39	10	10
Hapoel Tel Aviv	2006–07	29	10	3	5	4	1	6	2	0	4	2	0	44	18	4
Racing Genk	2007–08	32	16	3	0	0	0	0	0	0	1	0	0	33	16	3
Racing Genk	2008–09	26	5	9	3	1	2	0	0	0	0	0	0	29	6	11
Racing Genk	2009–10	30	7	8	1	0	0	0	0	0	2	1	0	33	8	8
Racing Genk	2010–11	32	14	9	2	2	1	0	0	0	3	2	0	35	18	10
Racing Genk	2011–12	22	9	7	1	0	0	0	0	0	10	1	0	33	10	7
Racing Genk	2012–13	23	6	6	3	1	5	0	0	0	7	2	0	33	9	11
Hapoel Be'er Sheva	2013–14	33	7	4	3	1	0	0	0	0	0	0	0	38	8	4
Hapoel Be'er Sheva	2014–15	35	8	2	5	0	0	3	1	1	2	0	0	43	9	3
Hapoel Be'er Sheva	2015–16	24	13	0	6	1	0	1	1	0	2	0	0	31	15	0
Career total		402	113	66	28	10	10	41	11	6	36	8	0	507	142	82

=== International ===
Scores and results list Israel's goal tally first.

List of international goals scored by Elyaniv Barda
No.	Date	Venue	Opponent	Score	Result	Competition
1.	17 November 2007	Ramat Gan Stadium, Ramat Gan, Israel	Russia	1–0	2–1	UEFA Euro 2008 qualifying
2.	21 November 2007	Ramat Gan Stadium, Ramat Gan, Israel	Macedonia	1–0	1–0	UEFA Euro 2008 qualifying
3.	19 November 2008	Ramat Gan Stadium, Ramat Gan, Israel	Ivory Coast	1–0	2–2	Friendly
4.	1 April 2009	Pankritio Stadium, Heraklion, Greece	Greece	1–1	1–2	2010 FIFA World Cup qualification
5.	12 August 2009	Windsor Park, Belfast, Northern Ireland	Northern Ireland	1–1	1–1	Friendly
6.	9 September 2009	Ramat Gan Stadium, Ramat Gan, Israel	Luxembourg	1–0	7–0	2010 FIFA World Cup qualification
7.	9 September 2009	Ramat Gan Stadium, Ramat Gan, Israel	Luxembourg	3–0	7–0	2010 FIFA World Cup qualification
8.	9 September 2009	Ramat Gan Stadium, Ramat Gan, Israel	Luxembourg	4–0	7–0	2010 FIFA World Cup qualification
9.	10 October 2009	Ramat Gan Stadium, Ramat Gan, Israel	Moldova	1–0	3–1	2010 FIFA World Cup qualification
10.	10 October 2009	Ramat Gan Stadium, Ramat Gan, Israel	Moldova	3–0	3–1	2010 FIFA World Cup qualification
— (Note: This was not a full international match and is therefore not included in Barda's total.)	3 March 2010	Stadionul Dan Păltinişanu, Timișoara, Romania	Romania B	2–0	2–0	Friendly
11.	26 March 2011	Bloomfield Stadium, Tel Aviv, Israel	Latvia	1–0	2–1	UEFA Euro 2012 qualifying

== Honours ==
=== Player ===
Maccabi Haifa

- Toto Cup Top Division: 2002–03
- Israeli Premier League: 2003–04, 2004–05

Hapoel Tel Aviv

- Israel State Cup: 2005–06, 2006–07

Genk

- Belgian Cup: 2008–09, 2012–13
- Belgian Pro League: 2010–11
- Belgian Super Cup (1): 2011

Hapoel Beer Sheva

- Israeli Premier League: 2015–16, 2016–17 2017–18
- Israel Super Cup: 2016, 2017
- Toto Cup: 2016–17

Individual

- Footballer of the Year in Israel: 2015–16 [1st place]
- Israeli Premier League Top scorer (1): 2015–16 [2nd place]

=== Manager ===
Hapoel Beer Sheva

- Israel State Cup: 2021–22
