= Yossi Shivhon =

Israeli footballer (born 1982)

Yossi Shivhon יוסי שבחון
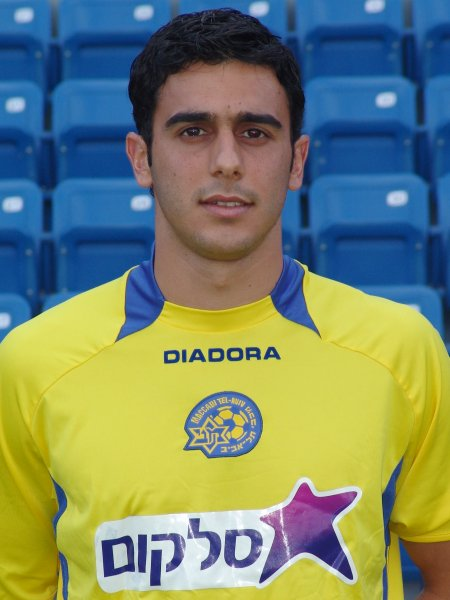
- Shivhon in 2007

Personal information
- Full name: Yossi Shivhon
- Date of birth: March 22, 1982 (age 44)
- Place of birth: Petah Tikva, Israel
- Height: 1.75 m (5 ft 9 in)
- Position: Midfielder

Team information
- Current team: Maccabi Herzliya (assistant manager)

Youth career
- Hapoel Petah Tikva

Senior career*
Years	Team	Apps	(Gls)
2000–2006	Hapoel Petah Tikva	144	(21)
2006–2010	Maccabi Tel Aviv	114	(24)
2010–2011	Hapoel Tel Aviv	25	(1)
2011–2012	Hapoel Be'er Sheva	31	(6)
2012–2013	Maccabi Netanya	32	(4)
2013–2017	Ironi Nir Ramat HaSharon	112	(26)
2017–2018	Maccabi Herzliya	8	(3)

International career
1998–1999	Israel U-16	9	(2)
1999–2000	Israel U-18	2	(2)
2001–2005	Israel U-21	16	(2)
2005–2006	Israel	3	(0)

Managerial career
- 2018–: Maccabi Herzliya (assistant manager)
- * Club domestic league appearances and goals as of 1 June 2017

Yossi Shivhon (Hebrew: יוסי שבחון; born March 22, 1982) is a retired Israeli footballer who serves as assistant coach for Maccabi Herzliya.

== Honours ==
Maccabi Tel Aviv

- Toto Cup: 2004–05, 2008–09

Hapoel Tel Aviv

- Israel State Cup: 2010–11
