= 2006–07 Israeli Premier League =

Israeli Premier League
- Season: 2006–07
- Champions: Beitar Jerusalem; 5th title
- Relegated: Hakoah Amidar Ramat Gan; Hapoel Petah Tikva
- Top goalscorer: Yaniv Azran (15)

The 2006–07 Israeli Premier League season began on 26 August 2006. It was scheduled to begin a week before, but was then postponed due to the 2006 Lebanon War. Beitar Jerusalem, under businessman Arcadi Gaydamak, became the league champions.

Two teams from Liga Leumit were promoted at the end of the previous season: Maccabi Herzliya and Hakoah Amidar Ramat Gan. The two teams relegated were Hapoel Nazareth Illit and Bnei Sakhnin.

== Teams and Locations ==
Locations of the 2006–07 Israeli Premier League teams

Twelve teams took part in the 2006–07 Israeli Premier League season, including ten teams from the 2005-06 season, as well as two teams which were promoted from the 2005-06 Liga Leumit.

Maccabi Herzliya were promoted as champions of the 2005-06 Liga Leumit. Hakoah Amidar Ramat Gan were promoted as runners up. Maccabi Herzliya and Hakoah Amidar Ramat Gan returned to the top flight after an absence of six and twenty seven seasons respectively.

Hapoel Nazareth Illit and Bnei Sakhnin were relegated after finishing in the bottom two places in the 2005-06 season.

Club	Stadium	Capacity
Beitar Jerusalem	Teddy Stadium	21,600
Bnei Yehuda	Bloomfield Stadium	15,700
Hapoel Tel Aviv	Bloomfield Stadium	15,700
Maccabi Tel Aviv	Bloomfield Stadium	15,700
Maccabi Haifa	Kiryat Eliezer Stadium	14,002
Maccabi Herzliya	Herzliya Municipal Stadium	8,100
Hakoah Amidar Ramat Gan	Winter Stadium	8,000
F.C. Ashdod	Yud-Alef Stadium	7,800
Maccabi Netanya	Sar-Tov Stadium	7,500
Maccabi Petah Tikva	Petah Tikva Municipal Stadium	6,800
Hapoel Petah Tikva	Petah Tikva Municipal Stadium	6,800
Hapoel Kfar Saba	Levita Stadium	5,800

Beitar Jerusalem	Bnei Yehuda Hapoel Tel Aviv Maccabi Tel Aviv	Hapoel Kfar Saba
Teddy Stadium	Bloomfield Stadium	Levita Stadium
Maccabi Netanya	Maccabi Haifa	Maccabi Petah Tikva Hapoel Petah Tikva
Sar-Tov Stadium	Kiryat Eliezer Stadium	Petah Tikva Municipal Stadium
F.C. Ashdod	Maccabi Herzliya	Hakoah Ramat Gan
Yud-Alef Stadium	Herzliya Municipal Stadium	Winter Stadium

== Final table ==
Pos	Team	Pld	W	D	L	GF	GA	GD	Pts	Qualification or relegation
1	Beitar Jerusalem (C)	33	19	10	4	52	24	+28	67	Qualification for the Champions League second qualifying round
2	Maccabi Netanya	33	15	12	6	37	25	+12	57	Qualification for the UEFA Cup second qualifying round
3	Maccabi Tel Aviv (Note: Deducted 2 points.)	33	15	11	7	42	28	+14	54	Qualification for the UEFA Cup first qualifying round
4	Hapoel Tel Aviv	33	15	9	9	53	40	+13	54	Qualification for the UEFA Cup second qualifying round (Note: Since Hapoel Tel Aviv won the Israeli State Cup, then the 5th-positioned team awarded with entry to the 2007 UEFA Intertoto Cup.)
5	Maccabi Haifa	33	14	9	10	45	39	+6	51	Qualification for the Intertoto Cup second round
6	Maccabi Petah Tikva	33	14	8	11	31	27	+4	50	
7	F.C. Ashdod	33	12	6	15	49	49	0	42	
8	Hapoel Kfar Saba	33	8	16	9	41	40	+1	40	
9	Bnei Yehuda	33	7	14	12	34	50	−16	35	
10	Maccabi Herzliya	33	9	7	17	47	55	−8	34	
11	Hakoah Amidar Ramat Gan (R)	33	6	10	17	32	54	−22	28	Relegation to Liga Leumit
12	Hapoel Petah Tikva (Note: Deducted 3 points.) (R)	33	3	10	20	29	61	−32	16	Relegation to Liga Leumit

Source: futbol24.com
Rules for classification: 1) points; 2) goal difference; 3) number of goals scored.
(C) Champions; (R) Relegated

== Results ==
=== First and second round ===
Home \ Away	BEI	BnY	ASH	HAK	HKS	HPT	HTA	MHA	MHE	MNE	MPT	MTA
Beitar Jerusalem	—	0–0	2–0	0–0	2–0	2–0	2–1	1–1	3–0	0–0	0–0	0–0
Bnei Yehuda	0–2	—	2–3	0–0	2–2	3–1	1–1	2–1	2–1	1–1	2–1	1–1
F.C. Ashdod	1–4	1–1	—	3–0	3–0	2–1	2–1	1–1	1–0	2–3	1–2	2–2
Hakoah Amidar Ramat Gan	0–2	3–2	0–1	—	0–0	0–3	3–4	1–0	1–2	0–1	0–0	0–1
Hapoel Kfar Saba	2–3	1–2	2–2	1–3	—	4–1	0–1	1–1	2–1	1–1	3–0	1–1
Hapoel Petah Tikva	0–1	0–0	2–3	2–1	0–0	—	0–2	0–2	1–1	0–0	0–1	1–2
Hapoel Tel Aviv	1–1	3–1	1–0	4–1	1–1	2–0	—	2–0	2–0	2–1	0–1	1–3
Maccabi Haifa	0–3	2–0	1–0	3–3	3–3	2–1	3–2	—	0–4	1–0	1–0	0–0
Maccabi Herzliya	2–1	0–0	1–2	1–2	1–3	0–0	2–2	2–2	—	1–0	0–3	0–2
Maccabi Netanya	3–1	0–0	1–3	1–0	1–0	1–1	1–1	3–1	1–0	—	2–0	1–1
Maccabi Petah Tikva	3–1	1–0	2–1	0–0	0–1	1–0	0–1	0–1	2–2	0–1	—	2–1
Maccabi Tel Aviv	1–2	4–0	1–0	1–0	0–2	1–0	0–0	1–1	2–1	0–0	1–0	—

Legend: Blue = home team win; Yellow = draw; Red = away team win.

=== Third round ===
Home \ Away	BEI	BnY	ASH	HAK	HKS	HPT	HTA	MHA	MHE	MNE	MPT	MTA
Beitar Jerusalem	—	—	—	—	2–1	2–0	2–1	4–1	2–2	0–1	—	—
Bnei Yehuda	1–3	—	3–2	—	—	—	—	—	1–4	—	0–1	3–2
F.C. Ashdod	1–1	—	—	—	2–0	4–1	—	0–1	0–2	—	—	0–1
Hakoah Amidar Ramat Gan	1–1	2–2	4–4	—	—	—	—	—	—	—	0–1	0–2
Hapoel Kfar Saba	—	1–1	—	0–0	—	—	1–1	1–0	—	0–0	—	—
Hapoel Petah Tikva	—	1–1	—	3–2	2–2	—	—	—	2–3	—	1–1	—
Hapoel Tel Aviv	—	0–0	2–1	1–2	—	5–1	—	—	—	—	2–2	3–0
Maccabi Haifa	—	2–0	—	1–2	—	6–1	4–0	—	—	0–0	0–1	—
Maccabi Herzliya	—	—	—	5–0	1–3	—	4–1	0–2	—	2–3	—	—
Maccabi Netanya	—	3–0	2–1	2–1	—	2–1	0–2	—	—	—	0–0	—
Maccabi Petah Tikva	0–1	—	2–0	—	0–0	—	—	—	4–2	—	—	0–2
Maccabi Tel Aviv	0–1	—	—	—	2–2	2–2	—	0–1	3–0	2–1	—	—

Legend: Blue = home team win; Yellow = draw; Red = away team win.

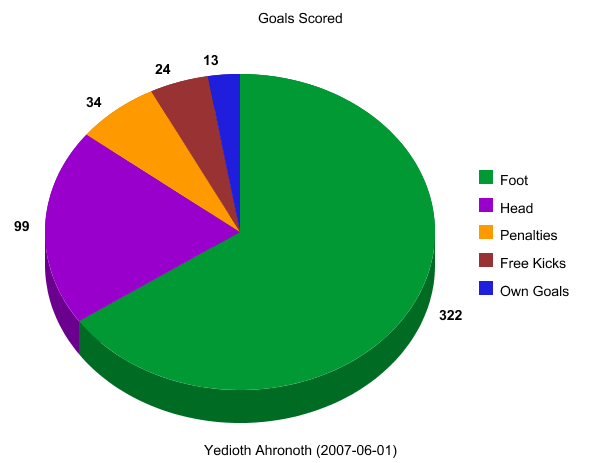
Breakdown of goals scored during the 2006–07 season

== Goals ==
=== Top goal scorers ===
Rank	Player	Club	Goals
1	(Israel) Yaniv Azran	F.C. Ashdod	15
2	(Israel) Lior Asulin	Bnei Yehuda	13
3	(Israel) Shay Holtzman	F.C. Ashdod	12
3	(Israel) Omer Buchsenbaum	Maccabi Herzliya	12
5	(Ghana) Samuel Yeboah	Hapoel Kfar Saba	11
5	(Israel) Idan Shriki	F.C. Ashdod	11
7	(Israel) Toto Tamuz	Beitar Jerusalem	10
7	(Nigeria) Ibezito Ogbonna	Hapoel Tel Aviv	10
7	(Israel) Avi Nimni	Maccabi Tel Aviv	10
7	(Israel) Elyaniv Barda	Hapoel Tel Aviv	10
7	(Ghana) Isaac Awudu	Maccabi Netanya	10

=== Goals in a Game ===
Individual
4, joint record:

- Elyaniv Barda, Hapoel Tel Aviv 4–3 over Hakoah Amidar Ramat Gan
- Shlomi Arbeitman, Maccabi Haifa 6–1 over Hapoel Petah Tikva

Game
8, Hakoah Amidar Ramat Gan 4-4 F.C. Ashdod

== Other Statistics ==
=== Attendance ===
Seasons highest
~20,000, 3 times:

- Maccabi Tel Aviv versus Beitar Jerusalem, Teddy Stadium, Jerusalem
- Hapoel Tel Aviv versus Beitar Jerusalem, Teddy Stadium, Jerusalem
- Maccabi Haifa versus Beitar Jerusalem, Teddy Stadium, Jerusalem

No.	Club	Average
1	Beitar Jerusalem	12,971
2	Hapoel Tel Aviv	8,094
3	Maccabi Haifa	7,794
4	Maccabi Tel Aviv	7,794
5	Maccabi Netanya	4,176
6	Hapoel Kfar-Saba	3,438
7	Ashdod	2,829
8	Bnei Yehuda Tel Aviv	2,619
9	Maccabi Petah Tikva	2,376
10	Hapoel Petah Tikva	2,256
11	Hakoah Ramat Gan	1,530
12	Maccabi Herzliya	1,350

=== Streaks ===
Longest unbeaten run, Maccabi Tel Aviv, 20 matches
Longest losing run, Hakoah Amidar Ramat Gan, 13 matches

== See also ==
- 2006–07 Toto Cup Al
