= 2005–06 Liga Leumit =

Israeli football season

The 2005–06 Liga Leumit season saw Maccabi Herzliya win the title and promotion to the Premier League. Runners-up Hakoah Amidar Ramat Gan were also promoted.

Ironi Rishon LeZion and Maccabi Be'er Sheva (playing in their first season at the second level) were relegated to Liga Artzit.

== Final table ==
Pos	Team	Pld	W	D	L	GF	GA	GD	Pts	Promotion or relegation
1	Maccabi Herzliya	33	16	9	8	42	22	+20	57	Promoted to Premier League
2	Hakoah Amidar Ramat Gan	33	15	11	7	47	31	+16	56	Promoted to Premier League
3	Ironi Kiryat Shmona	33	12	14	7	39	33	+6	50	
4	Hapoel Be'er Sheva	33	11	16	6	35	25	+10	49	
5	Hapoel Jerusalem	33	13	10	10	45	40	+5	49	
6	Hapoel Haifa	33	11	14	8	40	28	+12	47	
7	Hapoel Acre	33	12	10	11	32	33	−1	46	
8	Hapoel Ashkelon	33	10	8	15	33	40	−7	38	
9	Hapoel Ra'anana	33	8	12	13	31	36	−5	36	
10	Ironi Nir Ramat HaSharon	33	8	13	12	30	39	−9	35 (Note: Two points deducted.)	
11	Ironi Rishon LeZion	33	6	13	14	24	43	−19	31	Relegated to Liga Artzit
12	Maccabi Be'er Sheva	33	6	10	17	19	47	−28	27 (Note: One point deducted.)	Relegated to Liga Artzit

Source: rsssf.com
