= 2005–06 Toto Cup Artzit =

Toto Cup Artzit
- Season: 2005–06
- Champions: Hapoel Ramat Gan (2nd title)

The 2005–06 Toto Cup Artzit was the 7th time the cup was being contested. The final was played at Herzliya Municipal Stadium on 17 January 2006.

The winners were Hapoel Ramat Gan, beating Maccabi Ironi Tirat HaCarmel 2–0 in the final.

== Group stage ==
=== Group A ===
Pos	Team	Pld	W	D	L	GF	GA	GD	Pts	Qualification
1	Maccabi Ahi Nazareth	10	5	3	2	10	5	+5	18	Advanced to Semifinals
2	Maccabi Ironi Tirat HaCarmel	10	5	1	4	13	6	+7	16	Advanced to Semifinals
3	Hapoel Tzafririm Holon	10	4	3	3	12	17	−5	15	
4	Maccabi Ironi Kiryat Ata	10	4	2	4	13	13	0	14	
5	Maccabi Kafr Kanna	10	4	1	5	12	13	−1	13	
6	Hapoel Herzliya	10	0	6	4	5	11	−6	6	

Source: Maccabi Ahi Nazareth 2005/2006 IFA (in Hebrew)
Rules for classification: 1st points; 2nd goal difference; 3rd matches won; 4th goals scored; 5th head-to-head; 6th decision match

=== Group B ===
Pos	Team	Pld	W	D	L	GF	GA	GD	Pts	Qualification
1	Hapoel Ramat Gan	10	6	1	3	18	12	+6	19	Advanced to Semifinals
2	Maccabi HaShikma Ramat Hen	10	5	4	1	13	9	+4	19	Advanced to Semifinals
3	Hapoel Marmorek	10	5	3	2	15	8	+7	18	
4	Beitar Shimshon Tel Aviv	10	5	2	3	17	13	+4	17	
5	Maccabi Tzur Shalom	10	1	2	7	5	15	−10	5	
6	Hapoel Bnei Lod	10	0	4	6	4	15	−11	4	

Source: Hapoel Ramat Gan Asi 2005/2006 IFA (in Hebrew)
Rules for classification: 1st points; 2nd goal difference; 3rd matches won; 4th goals scored; 5th head-to-head; 6th decision match

=== Semi-finals ===
Home team	Score	Away team
Maccabi Ahi Nazareth	3–4	Maccabi Ironi Tirat HaCarmel
Hapoel Ramat Gan	2–0	Maccabi HaShikma Ramat Hen

=== Final ===
17 January 2006

Hapoel Ramat Gan	2–0	Maccabi Ironi Tirat HaCarmel
Ben David 52'; Ben Ezra 90+5'

Municipal Stadium, Herzliya

== See also ==
- Toto Cup
- 2005–06 Liga Artzit
- 2005–06 in Israeli football
