= 2005–06 Israeli Premier League =

Israeli Premier League
- Season: 2005–06
- Champions: Maccabi Haifa; 10th title
- Relegated: Hapoel Nazareth Illit; Bnei Sakhnin
- Top goalscorer: Shay Holtzman (18)

The 2005–06 Israeli Premier League season saw Maccabi Haifa win their third consecutive title. It took place from the first match on 26 August 2005 to the final match on 14 May 2006.

Two teams from Liga Leumit were promoted at the end of the previous season: Hapoel Kfar Saba and Maccabi Netanya. The two teams relegated were Hapoel Haifa and Hapoel Be'er Sheva.

== Teams and Locations ==
Locations of the 2005–06 Israeli Premier League teams

Twelve teams took part in the 2005-06 Israeli Premier League season, including ten teams from the 2004-05 season, as well as two teams which were promoted from the 2004-05 Liga Leumit.

Hapoel Kfar Saba were promoted as champions of the 2004-05 Liga Leumit. Maccabi Netanya were promoted as runners up. Hapoel Kfar Saba and Maccabi Netanya returned to the top flight after an absence of two and one seasons respectively.

Hapoel Haifa and Hapoel Be'er Sheva were relegated after finishing in the bottom two places in the 2004-05 season.

Club	Stadium	Capacity
Beitar Jerusalem	Teddy Stadium	21,600
Bnei Yehuda	Bloomfield Stadium	15,700
Hapoel Tel Aviv	Bloomfield Stadium	15,700
Maccabi Tel Aviv	Bloomfield Stadium	15,700
Maccabi Haifa	Kiryat Eliezer Stadium	14,002
F.C. Ashdod	Yud-Alef Stadium	7,800
Maccabi Netanya	Sar-Tov Stadium	7,500
Maccabi Petah Tikva	Petah Tikva Municipal Stadium	6,800
Hapoel Petah Tikva	Petah Tikva Municipal Stadium	6,800
Hapoel Kfar Saba	Levita Stadium	5,800
Bnei Sakhnin	Doha Stadium	5,000
Hapoel Nazareth Illit	Green Stadium	4,000

Beitar Jerusalem	Bnei Yehuda Hapoel Tel Aviv Maccabi Tel Aviv	Hapoel Kfar Saba
Teddy Stadium	Bloomfield Stadium	Levita Stadium
Maccabi Netanya	Maccabi Haifa	Maccabi Petah Tikva Hapoel Petah Tikva
Sar-Tov Stadium	Kiryat Eliezer Stadium	Petah Tikva Municipal Stadium
F.C. Ashdod	Bnei Sakhnin	Hapoel Nazareth Illit
Yud-Alef Stadium	Doha Stadium	Green Stadium

== Final table ==
Pos	Team	Pld	W	D	L	GF	GA	GD	Pts	Qualification or relegation
1	Maccabi Haifa (C)	33	23	6	4	65	25	+40	75	Qualification for the Champions League third qualifying round
2	Hapoel Tel Aviv	33	16	11	6	51	25	+26	59	Qualification for the UEFA Cup second qualifying round (Note: Since Hapoel Tel Aviv won the Israeli State Cup and finished in the 2nd place, then the 4th-positioned team awarded with entry to the 2006–2007 UEFA Cup and the 5th-positioned team being awarded entry to the Intertoto Cup.)
3	Beitar Jerusalem	33	17	7	9	51	33	+18	58	Qualification for the UEFA Cup second qualifying round
4	Bnei Yehuda	33	14	7	12	37	41	−4	49	Qualification for the UEFA Cup second qualifying round
5	Maccabi Petah Tikva	33	12	8	13	37	38	−1	44	Qualification for the Intertoto Cup second round
6	Maccabi Tel Aviv	33	11	11	11	35	37	−2	44	
7	Maccabi Netanya	33	11	8	14	40	45	−5	41	
8	F.C. Ashdod	33	9	12	12	46	47	−1	39	
9	Hapoel Petah Tikva	33	9	10	14	38	50	−12	37	
10	Hapoel Kfar Saba	33	8	10	15	30	41	−11	34	
11	Hapoel Nazareth Illit (R)	33	8	10	15	25	47	−22	34	Relegation to Liga Leumit
12	Bnei Sakhnin (R)	33	5	10	18	28	54	−26	25	Relegation to Liga Leumit

Source: futbol24.com
Rules for classification: 1) points; 2) goal difference; 3) number of goals scored.
(C) Champions; (R) Relegated

== Results ==
=== First and second round ===
Home \ Away	BEI	BnS	BnY	ASH	HKS	HNI	HPT	HTA	MHA	MNE	MPT	MTA
Beitar Jerusalem	—	3–2	2–2	0–1	1–0	4–0	0–1	0–2	0–1	1–1	2–0	0–1
Bnei Sakhnin	0–0	—	0–3	0–1	1–2	1–0	0–2	2–1	2–2	2–2	2–1	1–0
Bnei Yehuda	2–3	2–1	—	2–1	2–1	1–1	2–1	0–4	0–1	1–0	1–0	3–1
F.C. Ashdod	2–3	1–2	2–0	—	5–0	2–1	4–3	1–1	1–2	2–2	2–0	0–1
Hapoel Kfar Saba	0–2	0–0	1–1	2–2	—	1–2	1–1	0–1	1–2	1–2	2–0	1–0
Hapoel Nazareth Illit	1–1	3–2	0–0	2–1	1–0	—	2–1	1–1	0–6	1–3	2–0	0–0
Hapoel Petah Tikva	0–3	0–0	2–3	3–1	2–1	0–0	—	0–3	3–1	0–2	2–1	2–2
Hapoel Tel Aviv	1–1	2–2	2–0	3–1	3–1	4–0	1–1	—	0–0	2–0	1–1	2–0
Maccabi Haifa	3–0	4–1	1–0	4–0	1–0	2–1	2–0	1–0	—	2–1	3–2	2–1
Maccabi Netanya	2–3	0–0	0–1	1–1	3–2	1–0	0–0	1–0	1–3	—	0–1	3–1
Maccabi Petah Tikva	1–2	2–1	0–0	2–2	0–0	2–0	2–0	2–3	1–3	2–1	—	3–1
Maccabi Tel Aviv	2–3	2–0	2–2	2–1	2–1	0–0	3–0	2–0	1–0	1–0	0–0	—

Legend: Blue = home team win; Yellow = draw; Red = away team win.

=== Third round ===
Home \ Away	BEI	BnS	BnY	ASH	HKS	HNI	HPT	HTA	MHA	MNE	MPT	MTA
Beitar Jerusalem	—	—	3–0	—	0–1	0–2	—	—	1–0	4–0	1–0	—
Bnei Sakhnin	3–0	—	—	0–3	—	—	1–4	—	2–2	—	—	1–1
Bnei Yehuda	—	2–0	—	2–1	0–1	—	2–2	0–1	—	—	—	1–0
F.C. Ashdod	1–1	—	—	—	—	0–0	—	—	1–1	—	0–0	1–1
Hapoel Kfar Saba	—	1–0	—	1–1	—	3–1	0–0	—	—	—	2–2	—
Hapoel Nazareth Illit	—	2–1	0–1	—	—	—	0–1	1–1	—	0–1	—	—
Hapoel Petah Tikva	1–2	—	—	1–2	—	—	—	—	0–2	—	1–1	1–1
Hapoel Tel Aviv	1–1	1–0	—	1–1	1–2	—	3–0	—	—	—	—	2–0
Maccabi Haifa	—	—	4–0	—	1–1	4–0	—	0–1	—	2–1	2–1	—
Maccabi Netanya	—	1–1	2–1	3–1	1–0	—	2–3	1–1	—	—	—	—
Maccabi Petah Tikva	—	1–0	1–0	—	—	1–0	—	2–1	—	2–1	—	—
Maccabi Tel Aviv	2–1	—	—	—	0–0	1–1	—	—	1–1	3–1	0–3	—

Legend: Blue = home team win; Yellow = draw; Red = away team win.

== Top goal scorers ==
Rank	Player	Club	Goals
1	(Israel) Shay Holtzman	F.C. Ashdod	18
2	(Israel) (Argentina) Roberto Colautti	Maccabi Haifa	13
3	(Brazil) Gustavo Boccoli	Maccabi Haifa	12
3	(Israel) Lior Asulin	Beitar Jerusalem	12
5	(Israel) Toto Tammuz	Hapoel Petah Tikva	11
5	(Israel) Omer Golan	Maccabi Petah Tikva	11
5	(Israel) Yossi Shivhon	Hapoel Petah Tikva	11
8	(Democratic Republic of the Congo) Papi Kimoto	Maccabi Netanya	10
8	(Israel) Avi Nimni	Maccabi Tel Aviv	10
10	(Nigeria) Ibezito Ogbonna	Hapoel Tel Aviv	9
10	(Democratic Republic of the Congo) Alain Masudi	Maccabi Netanya	9
10	(Israel) Michael Zandberg	Maccabi Haifa	9

== See also ==
- 2005–06 Toto Cup Al
