= Alon Halfon =

Israeli footballer

Alon Halfon אלון חלפון
Personal information
- Full name: Alon Halfon
- Date of birth: July 2, 1973 (age 53)
- Place of birth: Netanya, Israel
- Position: Centre back

Youth career
- Maccabi Netanya

Senior career*
Years	Team	Apps	(Gls)
1990–1994	Maccabi Netanya	75	(0)
1994–2002	Hapoel Haifa	235	(3)
2002–2004	Hapoel Tel Aviv	40	(0)
2004–2007	Hapoel Kfar Saba	72	(0)

International career
1999–2000	Israel	5	(0)
- * Club domestic league appearances and goals

Alon Halfon (Hebrew: אלון חלפון; born July 2, 1973) is a former Israeli footballer.

== Honours ==
- Israeli Premier League (1):
  - 1998-99
- Toto Cup (1):
  - 2000-01
- Israeli Second Division (1):
  - 2004-05
