= Roberto Colautti =

Israeli footballer

Roberto Colautti רוברטו קולאוטי
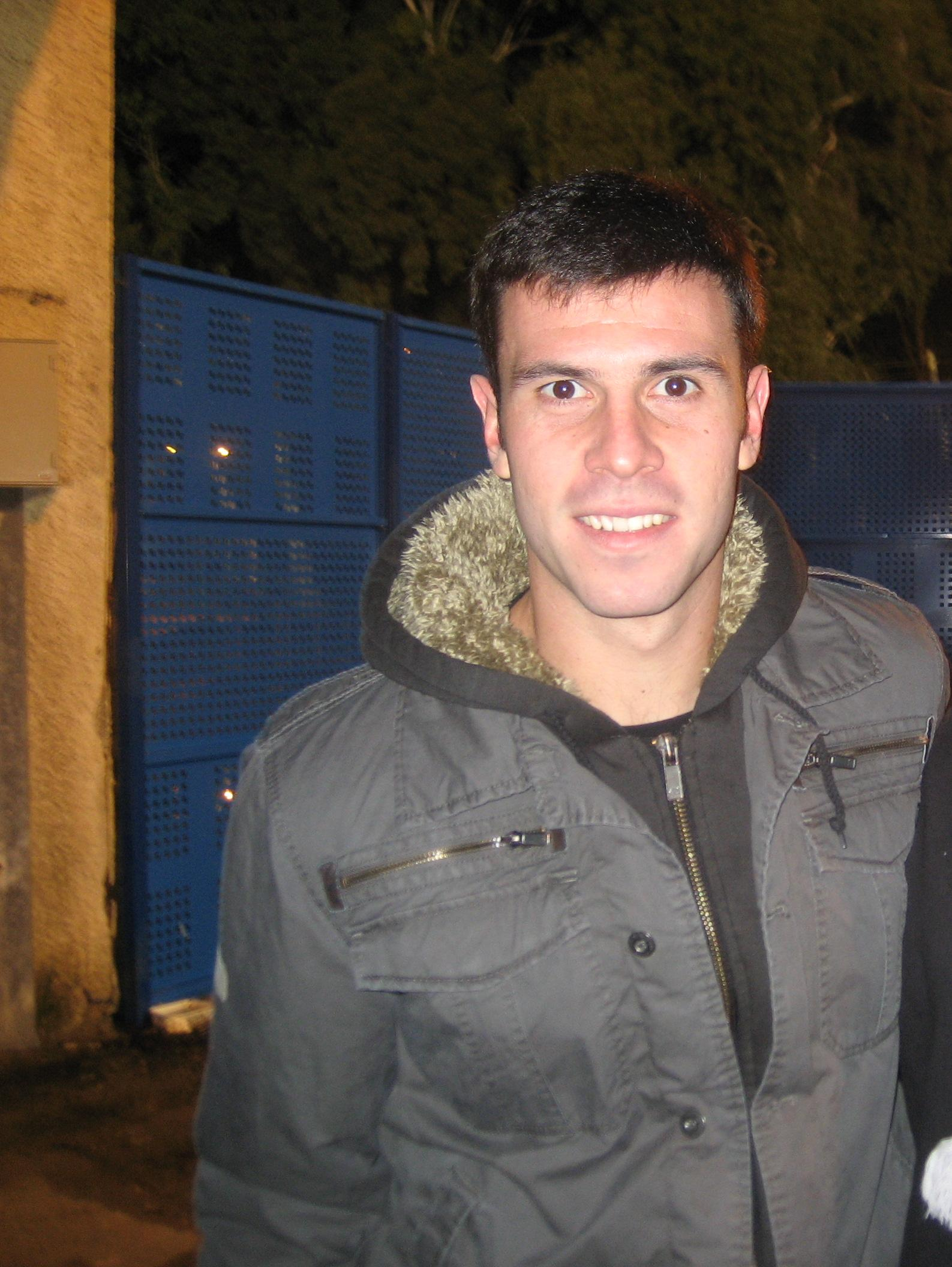
- Colautti in 2006

Personal information
- Full name: Roberto Damián Colautti
- Date of birth: 24 May 1982 (age 44)
- Place of birth: Córdoba, Argentina
- Height: 1.80 m (5 ft 11 in)
- Position: Forward

Youth career
- Boca Juniors

Senior career*
Years	Team	Apps	(Gls)
2000–2002	Boca Juniors	6	(1)
2002	Lugano	9	(0)
2002–2003	Banfield	32	(10)
2003–2004	Boca Juniors	11	(1)
2004–2007	Maccabi Haifa	90	(39)
2007–2010	Borussia Mönchengladbach	57	(9)
2010–2013	Maccabi Tel Aviv	71	(20)
2013–2014	Anorthosis Famagusta	32	(15)
2014–2015	AEK Larnaca	23	(8)
Total		331	(103)

International career
2006–2010	Israel	21	(6)
- * Club domestic league appearances and goals

Roberto Damián Colautti (Hebrew: רוברטו דמיאן קולאוטי; born 24 May 1982) is a former professional footballer who played as a forward. He began his career in Argentina with Boca Juniors and joined the Israeli club Maccabi Haifa in 2004. He became an Israeli citizen in 2007, on account of marrying an Israeli in 2005. He was promptly selected for the Israel national team, for which he won 21 caps over the next four years, scoring six goals.

Colautti played for the German team Borussia Mönchengladbach from 2007 to 2010, and then returned to Israel with Maccabi Tel Aviv. He moved to Cyprus in 2013 to join Anorthosis Famagusta; after a single season he joined AEK Larnaca. He left Larnaca in 2015.

== Early and personal life ==
Colautti was born in Córdoba, Argentina. His grandfather was from Udine in northeastern Italy.

He acquired an Israeli citizenship in 2007, two years after marrying his Israeli girlfriend Alvit Strauss (sister of Israeli goalkeepers Sagi Strauss and Ram Strauss) and on account of their marriage. They have four daughters.

== Club career ==
=== Early career ===
Colautti was raised in Lozada, a settlement of 1,000 inhabitants near Córdoba. After playing semi-professionally in the city, he attracted the attention of Boca Juniors from Buenos Aires.

In 2002, Colautti moved to Europe for the first time to play for AC Lugano in Switzerland. After the suicide of the club president, it was discovered that the club was in debt, and was relegated for administrative reasons to the second tier. Colautti then chose to return to Argentina, where he played for Banfield and Boca Juniors again.

=== Maccabi Haifa ===
Colautti joined Israeli team Maccabi Haifa in 2004. In his first season with Maccabi he was the top scorer in the 2004–05 Israeli Premier League with 19 goals from 30 appearances in Haifa's championship season. In the 2005–06 Israeli Premier League, Colautti was the league's second top scorer with 13 strikes from 28 matches in Haifa's successful title defence. He was also involved in their victory in the 2005–06 Toto Cup. In the 2006–07 Israeli Premier League, Colautti scored seven times in 32 matches, where Haifa finished the league in fifth place.

In the first round of the 2006–07 UEFA Cup, Roberto Colautti scored Maccabi Haifa's third goal against Litex Lovech, giving the Israeli side a 4–2 aggregate victory. Then, in the group stage, Colautti secured a 3–1 victory over the French side Auxerre at home, scoring Maccabi Haifa's third goal in the 58th minute, with Colautti rounding the Auxerre goalkeeper Fabien Cool, before slotting the ball home from a tight angle. Arguably Colautti's and Maccabi Haifa's most important goal, however, was his equalizer against Livorno Calcio in Livorno, Italy. In the second half, deep into injury time, in the 93rd minute, he dispatched Gustavo Boccoli's cross with a close-range header to deny Livorno a win, ending the match with a result of 1–1. The goal in the second leg of the Round of 32 encounter with CSKA Moscow, in the 14th minute, proved to be the winning goal, with Maccabi Haifa having drawn the first leg in Vladikavkaz, Russia, 0–0. Colautti's goal sent Maccabi Haifa through against CSKA, the team that had won the UEFA Cup only two years previously.

Colautti played 90 league matches for Maccabi Haifa, scoring 39 goals. He won two championship titles with The Greens and was a key part of their successful UEFA Cup campaign.

=== Borussia Mönchengladbach ===
Colautti joined 2. Bundesliga side Borussia Mönchengladbach on 1 August 2007 for an undisclosed fee, and dealt with injuries for most of this season. He did however manage to score 3 goals in his 10 appearances. Mönchengladbach finished first in the 2. Bundesliga to gain promotion to the Bundesliga for the 2008–09 season.

Colautti's second season at Borussia Park was again interrupted by injuries, and he only played 24 Bundesliga matches out of a possible 34; of which ten were starts. He scored a crucial goal for Mönchengladbach on 10 May 2009 against Schalke 04 in the 90th minute to secure a 1–0 win in his side's fourth-last league match of the season. This was the Israeli forward's only goal of the season; although he did score two goals in an 8–1 victory over VfB Fichte Bielefeld in a DFB Pokal tie. This late strike proved to be instrumental in securing Borussia's survival in the Bundesliga, as they finished one point clear of being forced to play-off for their position in the league, and just two points ahead of Karlsruher SC, who finished bottom.

=== Maccabi Tel Aviv ===
On 29 March 2010, Colautti signed a contract with Maccabi Tel Aviv and returned to Israel in July that year. On 1 August 2010, Colautti scored his first goal at Maccabi Toto Cup win against Maccabi Netanya. His first season in yellow was a tough one after the club underperformed and Colautti himself struggled to score. He lost his place with the first 11 and remained a substitute for the rest of the season. After all, Colautti managed to score nine league goals for Maccabi and an overall of 13 goals in 40 appearances during the season.

=== AEK Larnaca ===
Colautti joined AEK Larnaca on 28 June 2014, signing a one-year deal, with the possibility to extend the contract. His league debut came on 24 August 2014 in a 5–2 victory against Apollon Limassol, where he scored his first goals, a brace.

== International career ==
On 2 September 2006, Colautti made his debut for the Israel national team, having received clearance from FIFA only two days before the match. His debut saw Israel defeat Estonia 1–0 in Tallinn, Estonia. Colautti scored the only goal of the match in the 9th minute. He has scored a brace against Croatia and further goals against Andorra, Macedonia and another goal against Estonia. All of his goals have come in Israel's UEFA Euro 2008 qualifiers; in his first seven matches, he had six international goals to his name.

Colautti was granted full Israeli citizenship along with Toto Tamuz (originally from Nigeria), after their respective applications were approved by the Minister of Internal Affairs Roni Bar-On in 2007.

== Career statistics ==
Scores and results list Israel's goal tally first, score column indicates score after each Colautti goal.

List of international goals scored by Roberto Colautti
No.	Date	Venue	Opponent	Score	Result	Competition
1	2 September 2006	Lilleküla Stadium, Tallinn, Estonia	Estonia	1–0	1–0	Euro 2008 qualifying
2	15 November 2006	Ramat Gan Stadium, Ramat Gan, Israel	Croatia	1–0	3–4	Euro 2008 qualifying
3	15 November 2006	Ramat Gan Stadium, Ramat Gan, Israel	Croatia	3–4	3–4	Euro 2008 qualifying
4	28 March 2007	Ramat Gan Stadium, Ramat Gan, Israel	Estonia	2–0	4–0	Euro 2008 qualifying
5	2 June 2007	National Arena Philip II of Macedon, Skopje, Macedonia	Macedonia	2–1	2–1	Euro 2008 qualifying
6	6 June 2007	Estadi Comunal d'Aixovall, Andorra La Vella, Andorra	Andorra	2–0	2–0	Euro 2008 qualifying

== Honours ==
Boca Juniors

- Argentine Primera División: 2003 Apertura

Maccabi Haifa

- Israeli Premier League: 2004–05, 2005–06
- Toto Cup: 2005–06

Borussia Mönchengladbach

- 2. Bundesliga: 2007–08

Maccabi Tel Aviv

- Israeli Premier League: 2012–13

Individual

- Israeli Premier League top goalscorer: 2004–05
