= 2005–06 Israel State Cup =

Tournament details
- Country: Israel

Final positions
- Champions: Hapoel Tel Aviv (11th title)
- Runners-up: Bnei Yehuda

The 2005–06 Israel State Cup (Hebrew: גביע המדינה, Gvia HaMedina) was the 67th season of Israel's nationwide football cup competition and the 52nd after the Israeli Declaration of Independence.

The competition was won by Hapoel Tel Aviv, who had beaten Bnei Yehuda 1–0 at the final.

By winning, Hapoel Tel Aviv qualified for the second round of the UEFA Cup.

== Results ==
=== Ninth Round ===
Home team	Score	Away team
Hapoel Acre	1–0	Ironi Kiryat Shmona
Hapoel Nir Ramat HaSharon	2–1 (a.e.t.)	Hapoel Nazareth Illit
Hapoel Tel Aviv	3–0	Ironi Rishon LeZion
Hapoel Kfar Saba	3–0	Maccabi Ahi Nazareth
Hapoel Be'er Sheva	2–0 (a.e.t.)	Maccabi Tirat HaCarmel
Hakoah Amidar Ramat Gan	2–1 (a.e.t.)	Hapoel Ra'anana
Bnei Sakhnin	4–0	Maccabi Be'er Sheva
Hapoel Jerusalem	0–2	Maccabi Herzliya
Maccabi Kafr Kanna	1–0	Maccabi Or Akiva
F.C. Ashdod	3–2	Hapoel Haifa
Maccabi Haifa	1–0	Hapoel Petah Tikva
Hapoel Marmorek	2–0	Maccabi Kiryat Gat
Maccabi Netanya	0–2	Maccabi Petah Tikva
Beitar Jerusalem	4–0	Ironi Kiryat Ata
Hapoel Ashkelon	0–2	Bnei Yehuda
Hapoel Bnei Lod	0–3	Maccabi Tel Aviv

=== Round of 16 ===
Home team	Score	Away team
Maccabi Herzliya	2–2 (a.e.t.) (12–13 p.)	Maccabi Petah Tikva
Hapoel Marmorek	0–1	Hapoel Kfar Saba
Maccabi Tel Aviv	0–4	Hapoel Acre
Beitar Jerusalem	0–1	Hakoah Amidar Ramat Gan
Hapoel Nir Ramat HaSharon	1–3	Bnei Sakhnin
F.C. Ashdod	0–3	Hapoel Tel Aviv
Hapoel Be'er Sheva	1–2	Maccabi Haifa
Maccabi Kafr Kanna	0–1 (a.e.t.)	Bnei Yehuda

=== Quarter-finals ===
Home team	Score	Away team
Maccabi Haifa	0–0 (a.e.t.) (4–3 p.)	Maccabi Petah Tikva
Hapoel Acre	1–2 (a.e.t.)	Bnei Yehuda
Hapoel Kfar Saba	1–3	Bnei Sakhnin
Hakoah Amidar Ramat Gan	0–3	Hapoel Tel Aviv

=== Semi-finals ===
Home team	Score	Away team
Bnei Yehuda	2–0 (a.e.t.)	Maccabi Haifa
Hapoel Tel Aviv	2–0	Bnei Sakhnin

=== Final ===
9 May 2006

Hapoel Tel Aviv	1–0	Bnei Yehuda
Yavruyan 87'

Ramat Gan Stadium
Attendance: 34000
Referee: Yefet
