= 2004–05 Israeli Premier League =

Israeli Premier League
- Season: 2004–05
- Champions: Maccabi Haifa; 9th title
- Relegated: Hapoel Haifa; Hapoel Be'er Sheva
- Top goalscorer: Roberto Colautti (19)

The 2004–05 Israeli Premier League season saw Maccabi Haifa win their second consecutive title and ninth overall. It took place from the first match on 21 August 2004 to the final match on 28 May 2005.

Two teams from Liga Leumit were promoted at the end of the previous season: Hapoel Haifa and Hapoel Nazareth Illit. The two teams relegated were Maccabi Netanya and Maccabi Ahi Nazareth.

== Teams and Locations ==
Locations of the 2004–05 Israeli Premier League teams

Twelve teams took part in the 2004-05 Israeli Premier League season, including ten teams from the 2003-04 season, as well as two teams which were promoted from the 2003-04 Liga Leumit.

Hapoel Haifa were promoted as champions of the 2003-04 Liga Leumit. Hapoel Nazareth Illit were promoted as runners up. Hapoel Haifa returned to the top flight after an absence of two seasons, while Hapoel Nazareth Illit made their debut in the top flight.

Maccabi Netanya and Maccabi Ahi Nazareth were relegated after finishing in the bottom two places in the 2003-04 season.

Club	Stadium	Capacity
Beitar Jerusalem	Teddy Stadium	21,600
Bnei Yehuda	Bloomfield Stadium	15,700
Hapoel Tel Aviv	Bloomfield Stadium	15,700
Maccabi Tel Aviv	Bloomfield Stadium	15,700
Hapoel Haifa	Kiryat Eliezer Stadium	14,002
Maccabi Haifa	Kiryat Eliezer Stadium	14,002
Bnei Sakhnin^{[A]}	Kiryat Eliezer Stadium	14,002
Hapoel Be'er Sheva	Vasermil Stadium	13,000
F.C. Ashdod	Yud-Alef Stadium	7,800
Maccabi Petah Tikva	Petah Tikva Municipal Stadium	6,800
Hapoel Petah Tikva	Petah Tikva Municipal Stadium	6,800
Hapoel Nazareth Illit	Green Stadium	4,000

The club played their home games at a neutral venue because their own ground did not meet Premier League requirements.

Beitar Jerusalem	Bnei Yehuda Hapoel Tel Aviv Maccabi Tel Aviv	Hapoel Be'er Sheva
Teddy Stadium	Bloomfield Stadium	Vasermil Stadium
Hapoel Haifa Maccabi Haifa Bnei Sakhnin	Maccabi Petah Tikva Hapoel Petah Tikva	F.C. Ashdod
Kiryat Eliezer Stadium	Petah Tikva Municipal Stadium	Yud-Alef Stadium
Hapoel Nazareth Illit
Green Stadium

== Final table ==
Pos	Team	Pld	W	D	L	GF	GA	GD	Pts	Qualification or relegation
1	Maccabi Haifa (C)	33	21	8	4	66	27	+39	71	Qualification for the Champions League second qualifying round
2	Maccabi Petah Tikva	33	16	12	5	47	24	+23	60	Qualification for the UEFA Cup second qualifying round
3	F.C. Ashdod	33	15	5	13	48	44	+4	50	Qualification for the UEFA Cup second qualifying round
4	Beitar Jerusalem	33	13	8	12	46	44	+2	47	Qualification for the Intertoto Cup first round
5	Hapoel Nazareth Illit	33	12	10	11	46	46	0	46	
6	Bnei Yehuda	33	12	8	13	40	46	−6	44	
7	Hapoel Petah Tikva	33	11	9	13	41	46	−5	42	
8	Maccabi Tel Aviv	33	10	10	13	32	42	−10	40	Qualification for the UEFA Cup second qualifying round (Note: Maccabi Tel Aviv won the Israeli State Cup.)
9	Hapoel Tel Aviv	33	10	9	14	30	34	−4	39	
10	Bnei Sakhnin	33	10	6	17	40	51	−11	36	
11	Hapoel Haifa (R)	33	9	8	16	36	44	−8	35	Relegation to Liga Leumit
12	Hapoel Be'er Sheva (R)	33	7	11	15	33	57	−24	32	Relegation to Liga Leumit

Source: RSSSF; Futbol24.com
(C) Champions; (R) Relegated

== Results ==
=== First and second round ===
Home \ Away	BEI	BnS	BnY	ASH	HBS	HHA	HNI	HPT	HTA	MHA	MPT	MTA
Beitar Jerusalem	—	0–2	3–2	1–0	4–1	2–0	0–2	0–1	1–2	0–0	0–0	2–0
Bnei Sakhnin	4–1	—	0–1	2–1	4–3	0–0	0–1	1–2	1–2	1–4	0–0	0–1
Bnei Yehuda	1–0	3–0	—	0–4	0–0	2–1	3–1	1–0	0–0	0–2	1–0	2–2
F.C. Ashdod	2–3	2–2	4–3	—	0–2	2–0	3–1	2–0	2–1	0–1	0–0	2–0
Hapoel Be'er Sheva	0–2	0–4	0–0	0–2	—	2–1	2–2	1–1	1–0	0–1	1–2	1–1
Hapoel Haifa	3–1	1–0	0–1	1–3	0–2	—	0–0	2–3	0–0	1–4	0–3	1–2
Hapoel Nazareth Illit	4–3	1–2	2–1	2–0	3–3	0–0	—	3–0	1–0	0–1	0–0	1–1
Hapoel Petah Tikva	1–3	1–1	3–1	2–1	4–1	2–2	1–2	—	1–0	2–2	0–0	1–0
Hapoel Tel Aviv	1–1	3–2	0–0	0–1	1–0	1–2	3–1	0–1	—	0–1	2–2	3–0
Maccabi Haifa	1–1	1–0	5–0	6–0	4–1	3–0	3–1	1–0	1–0	—	0–0	3–0
Maccabi Petah Tikva	2–0	2–0	3–0	5–1	0–0	0–0	1–1	1–0	2–0	0–2	—	2–1
Maccabi Tel Aviv	1–0	1–2	1–0	0–1	1–1	1–1	1–1	1–0	1–0	1–0	1–0	—

Source: RSSSF
Legend: Blue = home team win; Yellow = draw; Red = away team win.

=== Third round ===
Home \ Away	BEI	BnS	BnY	ASH	HBS	HHA	HNI	HPT	HTA	MHA	MPT	MTA
Beitar Jerusalem	—	0–0	—	—	0–1	—	3–3	—	—	—	4–2	3–2
Bnei Sakhnin	—	—	2–4	2–0	—	—	—	2–0	0–1	3–2	—	—
Bnei Yehuda	1–1	—	—	0–1	—	—	—	2–1	4–0	2–2	—	—
F.C. Ashdod	1–2	—	—	—	—	1–1	4–2	—	1–1	4–0	—	0–0
Hapoel Be'er Sheva	—	1–1	2–1	2–0	—	—	—	1–4	—	1–1	—	—
Hapoel Haifa	2–0	4–0	0–2	—	6–1	—	—	—	1–0	—	—	—
Hapoel Nazareth Illit	—	2–0	3–0	—	1–0	1–2	—	3–1	—	—	1–3	—
Hapoel Petah Tikva	0–2	—	—	1–3	—	1–0	—	—	1–1	1–1	—	4–4
Hapoel Tel Aviv	1–1	—	—	—	3–1	—	0–0	—	—	—	1–0	1–0
Maccabi Haifa	1–2	—	—	—	—	2–1	3–0	—	3–2	—	2–2	3–1
Maccabi Petah Tikva	—	4–2	2–1	1–0	3–1	1–0	—	1–1	—	—	—	—
Maccabi Tel Aviv	—	2–0	1–1	—	0–0	1–3	2–0	—	—	—	1–3	—

Source: RSSSF
Legend: Blue = home team win; Yellow = draw; Red = away team win.

== Top goal scorers ==
Rank	Player	Club	Goals
1	(Argentina) Roberto Colautti	Maccabi Haifa	19
2	(Israel) Lior Asulin	Beitar Jerusalem	15
3	(Israel) Shay Holtzman	F.C. Ashdod	14
4	(Brazil) José Duarte	Hapoel Nazareth Illit	13
4	(Israel) Idan Tal	Maccabi Haifa	13
6	(Israel) Shlomi Arbeitman	Hapoel Petah Tikva	12
6	(Israel) Avi Nimni	Beitar Jerusalem	12
8	(Nigeria) Ngoy Alumeida	Bnei Sakhnin	10
8	(Brazil) Gustavo Boccoli	Maccabi Haifa	10
8	(Russia) Stanislav Dubrovin	Maccabi Petah Tikva	10
8	(Israel) Moshe Biton	Bnei Yehuda	10

Source: RSSSF

== See also ==
- 2004–05 Toto Cup Al
