= Maor Zohar =

Israeli footballer

Maor (Meir) Zohar מאור זוהר
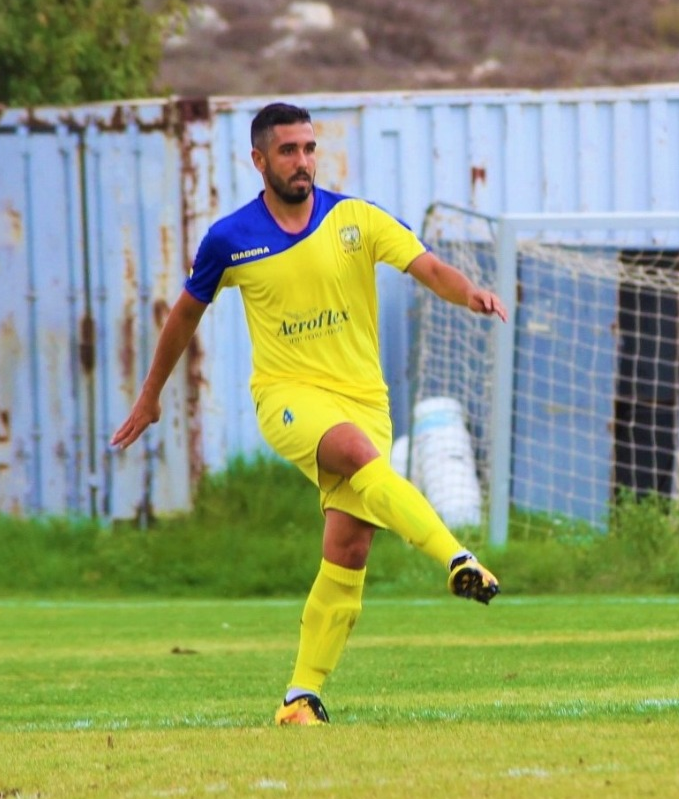

Personal information
- Full name: Maor Zohar
- Date of birth: June 3, 1985 (age 41)
- Place of birth: Ashdod, Israel
- Height: 1.83 m (6 ft 0 in)
- Position: Attacking midfielder

Senior career*
Years	Team	Apps	(Gls)
2002–2009	F.C. Ashdod	56	(1)
2007	→ Hapoel Ashkelon	16	(0)
2009–2010	Hakoah Ramat Gan	12	(0)
2010	Hapoel Ra'anana	14	(1)
2010–2011	Maccabi Be'er Sheva	33	(1)
2011–2012	Hapoel Ashkelon	23	(3)
2012–2013	Sektzia Ness Ziona	34	(2)
2013–2015	Maccabi Kiryat Gat	54	(1)
2016–2017	Sektzia Ness Ziona	41	(1)
2017–2021	Maccabi Ironi Ashdod	71	(4)
2020–2021	→ Maccabi Tamra	4	(0)
- * Club domestic league appearances and goals

Maor (Meir) Zohar (Hebrew: מאור זוהר; born June 3, 1985) is a former Israeli footballer.

He was of a Tunisian-Jewish descent.
