= Idan Shriki =

Israeli footballer

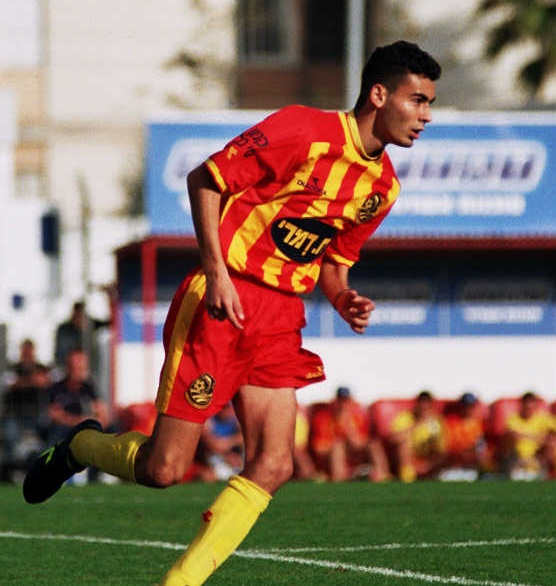
- Idan Shriki in 2003–04

Personal information
- Full name: Idan Shriki
- Date of birth: 30 November 1981 (age 44)
- Place of birth: Ashdod, Israel
- Height: 1.85 m (6 ft 1 in)
- Position: Forward

Youth career
- 1994–1999: Maccabi Ironi Ashdod

Senior career*
Years	Team	Apps	(Gls)
2001–2011	Ashdod	177	(48)
2001–2002	→ Maccabi Kiryat Ekron (loan)	30	(21)
2002–2003	→ Maccabi Yavne (loan)	26	(15)
2011–2012	Górnik Zabrze	0	(0)
2011–2012	→ Ashdod (loan)	35	(11)
2012–2015	Maccabi Netanya	52	(11)
2013	→ Maccabi Petah Tikva (loan)	16	(9)
2015	Maccabi Kiryat Gat	17	(5)
2015–2016	Hapoel Ashkelon	37	(16)
2016–2017	Hapoel Bnei Lod	12	(2)
2017–2018	Hapoel Marmorek	48	(14)
2018–2020	Hapoel Ashdod	37	(21)
- * Club domestic league appearances and goals

Idan Shriki (Hebrew: עידן שריקי; born 30 November 1981) is an Israeli former professional footballer who played as a forward.

== Career ==
=== Club ===
He made his Ashdod debut in the 2003–04 season against Maccabi Netanya after returning from a one-season loan to Maccabi Yavne where he scored a league leading 25 goals. It wasn't until the 2006–07 season that Shriki received considerable playing time and he returned the favor to manager Alon Hazan by scoring eleven goals and adding three assists. Playing behind Yaniv Azran and Shay Holtzman, the threesome accounted for 77% of goals scored by Ashdod.

In July 2011, Shriki signed a two-year contract with Ekstraklasa's record holder for most championships, Górnik Zabrze. On 9 September 2011, he was loaned to his former club F.C. Ashdod until the end of the season.

On 3 July 2012, Shriki signed a three-year contract with Maccabi Netanya. On January 16, 2013, he was loaned to Maccabi Petah Tikva after a very poor half season with Netanya where he only scored 2 league goals in 12 games. He returned the next season to help Netanya win the Liga Leumit and reach the State Cup finals. In January 2015 he was released from his contract with Netanya and moved to Maccabi Kiryat Gat there he had a rather poor season only scoring 5 times in 17 caps.

On 14 June 2015, Shriki signed a one-year deal with Hapoel Ashkelon.

== Honours ==
Ashdod

- Toto Cup runner-up: 2004–05, 2005–06, 2008–09

Maccabi Netanya

- Liga Leumit: 2012–13, 2013–14
- Israel State Cup runner-up: 2014
