= Yaniv Azran =

Israeli footballer

Yaniv Azran יניב עזרן
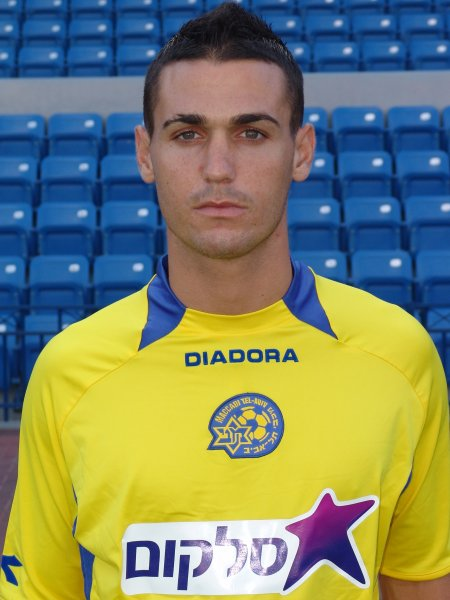

Personal information
- Full name: Yaniv Azran
- Date of birth: 12 May 1983 (age 43)
- Place of birth: Ashdod, Israel
- Position: Striker

Youth career
- 1992–2000: F.C. Ashdod

Senior career*
Years	Team	Apps	(Gls)
2000–2006	F.C. Ashdod	99	(27)
2003–2004	→ Hapoel Ra'anana (loan)	23	(6)
2006	Paralimni	1	(0)
2006–2007	F.C. Ashdod	28	(15)
2007–2011	Maccabi Tel Aviv	24	(1)

International career^{‡}
2004–2005	Israel U21	7	(1)
- * Club domestic league appearances and goals as of 9 May 2010 ‡ National team caps and goals as of 9 December 2006

Yaniv Azran (Hebrew: יניב עזרן; born 12 May 1983) is a retired Israeli footballer.

== Playing career ==
Azran grew up in the youth system of F.C. Ashdod in Israel.

After finishing the 2005–06 season in Ashdod and seeing little playing time, Nir Klinger signed Azran to a two-year contract worth $120,000 a year while managing Paralimni. After a failed stint playing in Cyprus, he returned to Ashdod and finished the season with 15 goals. His achievement did not go unnoticed by European clubs, he was said to be on his way to Spain if he could secure a Polish passport (Azran is of Polish descent on his mother's side).

At the beginning of 2007–08 season Azran transferred Maccabi Tel Aviv for a fee of $775,000. In his first season, he managed to score only one goal for the team which since then has been his only goal mostly because Azran spent most of the next two seasons on the injured list with various knee and ankle injuries. In 4 seasons with the club he only managed to play 34 games in all competitions, scoring 4 goals and providing 4 assists.

He won a lawsuit against the club after they had not paid most of his salary in his last season with Maccabi, in November 2012, Maccabi was ordered to pay $240,000 to Azran as compensation.

In February 2012, he announced his retirement from the game.

== Honours ==
- Toto Cup winner: 2008–09
- Toto Cup runner-up: 2001–02, 2004–05, 2005–06
