= Maccabi Herzliya F.C. =

Israeli football club

Maccabi Herzliya
- Full name: Maccabi Herzliya Football Club מועדון כדורגל מכבי הרצליה
- Founded: 1932; 94 years ago
- Ground: Herzliya Municipal Stadium, Herzliya
- Capacity: 8,300
- Chairman: Ariel Sheiman
- Manager: Nitzan Damari
- League: Liga Leumit
- 2025–26: Liga Leumit, 3rd of 16
- Website: www.maccabiherzeliya.com
Home colours	Away colours	Third colours

Maccabi Herzliya F.C. (Hebrew: מועדון כדורגל מכבי הרצליה, Moadon Kaduregel Maccabi Herzliya) is an Israeli football club based in Herzliya. The club is currently in Liga Leumit and plays at the Herzliya Municipal Stadium.

== History ==
A chart showing the progress of Maccabi Herzliya through the Israeli football league system, from 1939 to the present

A football section of the Maccabi Herzliya Sports Club existed and played several matches since 1929, including competing in the 1930 Palestine Cup. The club was formally established in 1932. In 1978 they were promoted to Liga Artzit (then the second tier). However, they finished bottom in the 1980–81 season and were relegated back to Liga Alef. In 1983 they moved to the Herzliya Municipal Stadium, which they share with city rivals Hapoel Herzliya.

At the start of the 1990s the club returned to Liga Artzit, and were promoted to Liga Leumit (then the top division) for the first time in their history in 1992–93 as Artzit champions. They avoided relegation by a single point in 1994–95, and finished one place above the relegation zone again in 1996–97 and 1998–99. In the first season of the new Premier League in 1999–2000, they finished second bottom and were relegated.

In 2001–02 they finished third, narrowly missing out on promotion back to the Premier League. In 2005, they reached the State Cup final for the first time, losing to Maccabi Tel Aviv on penalties after a 2–2 draw. In 2005–06 they won Liga Leumit (now the second tier) to return to the top division. After finishing one place above the relegation zone in the 2006–07 season, In the 2007–08 season they finished bottom and relegated back to Liga Leumit.

== Current squad ==
As to 1 July 2026

No.	Pos.	Nation	Player
1	GK	ISR	Matan Zalmanovic
3	DF	ISR	Ido David
4	DF	ISR	Liam Shahar
5	DF	ISR	Alon Ginat
6	MF	ISR	Shay Ayzen
7	MF	ISR	Shay Balahssan
8	MF	ISR	Amit Yeverbaum
9	FW	GHA	Emmanuel Apeh
10	FW	ISR	Idan Dahan
11	FW	ISR	Sagi Genis
14	DF	ISR	Ali Kayal

No.	Pos.	Nation	Player
15	MF	ISR	Idan Rabinovich
18	DF	ISR	Avi Turgeman
19	DF	ISR	Roy Hazan
20	MF	ISR	Ofek Mishan
22	GK	ISR	Shon Ben Nesher
23	MF	ISR	Mohammed Abu Fani
25	DF	ISR	Ziv Leigh
27	MF	BUL	Iliyan Stefanov
28	MF	ISR	Amit Ben Kish
30	FW	GAM	Ansumana Sanyang

== Honours ==
- Toto Cup
  - Winners: 2007
- Second Division
  - Champions: 1992–93, 2005–06
- Third Division (South)
  - Champions: 2022–23

== Notable managers ==
- Eli Cohen (born 1951)
- Gili Landau (born 1958)
