= Petah Tikva Municipal Stadium =

Multi-use stadium in Petah Tikva, Israel (1965-2010)

Coordinates: 32°05′52.20″N 34°52′23.53″E

Petah Tikva Municipal Stadium האצטדיון העירוני פתח תקוה
- HaUrva
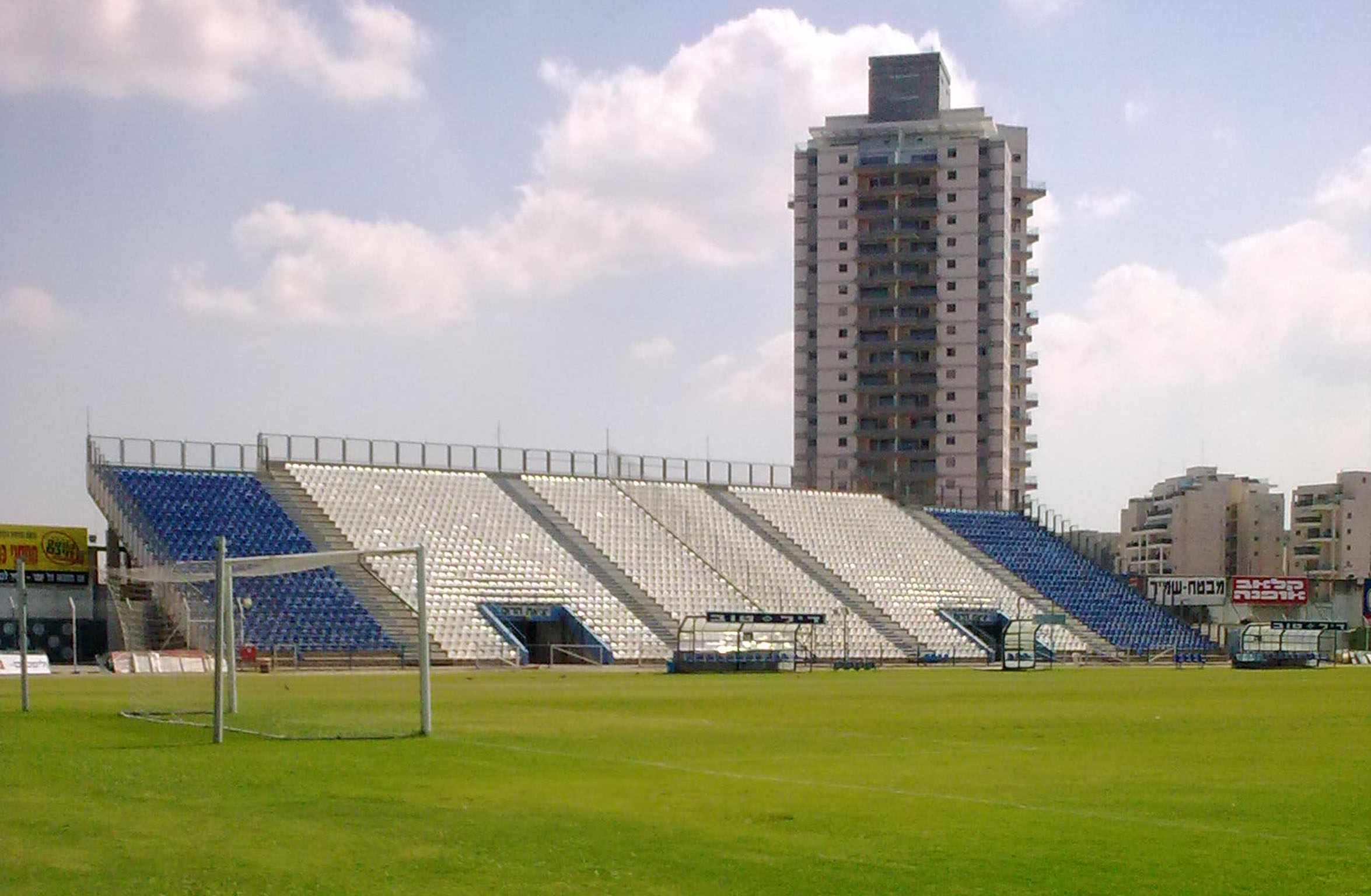
- Interactive map of Petah Tikva Municipal Stadium האצטדיון העירוני פתח תקוה
- Location: Petah Tikva, Israel
- Owner: Meir Shamir
- Operator: Municipality of Petah Tikva
- Capacity: 6,768
- Surface: Grass

Construction
- Opened: 1965
- Closed: 2010
- Demolished: 2010

Tenants
- Maccabi Petah Tikva (until 2010); Hapoel Petah Tikva (until 2010)

The Petah Tikva Municipal Stadium, commonly known as HaUrva Stadium (Hebrew: אצטדיון האורווה, Itztadion HaUrva, lit. Livery Stable Stadium) was a multi-use stadium in the central Israeli city of Petah Tikva, and is now a place which is a neighborhood. It was replaced by HaMoshava Stadium in 2011.

The stadium was built in 1965, and has two all-seater stands on either side of the pitch with a seated capacity of 6,768. Both ends are undeveloped and are used as parking spaces for team buses.

Though the stadium is defined as multi-use, it is in reality used almost entirely for football. It is the home stadium of both Hapoel Petah Tikva and city rivals Maccabi Petah Tikva, who moved to the stadium in the late 1970s after their Maccabi Sports Ground was abandoned.

The stadium has hosted European football, as Hapoel have played in the UEFA Cup Winners' Cup, the UEFA Cup and the Intertoto Cup and Maccabi in the Intertoto Cup. Although Maccabi have qualified for the UEFA Cup twice in recent seasons, security concerns have prevented matches from being staged in the city, with matches played either abroad or in the Ramat Gan Stadium in the Tel Aviv District city of Ramat Gan.

In summer 2010 the stadium was abandoned and turned into a neighborhood.
