= List of Maccabiah medalists in football (men) =

This is an incomplete list of men's Maccabiah medalists in football from 1932 to 2017.

Games	Gold	Silver	Bronze
1932 Maccabiah	Poland	Eretz Israel	–
1935 Maccabiah	Romania	Germany	Eretz Israel
1950 Maccabiah	Israel	South Africa	Great Britain
1953 Maccabiah	Israel	South Africa	Great Britain
1957 Maccabiah	Israel	Great Britain	France
1961 Maccabiah	Great Britain: David Pleat	Israel	South Africa
1965 Maccabiah	Israel	Great Britain	Mexico
1969 Maccabiah	Israel	Argentina	Great Britain
1973 Maccabiah	Israel: David Schweitzer (coach); Alon Ben David; Arie Bejerano; Boris Norman; Israel Hajaj; Itzhak Makmel; Mordechai Berger; Nahum Ta-Shma; Rafi Eliyahu; Vicky Peretz; Yehiel Salem; Yoel Masuari	Mexico: Yosef Cherem	Brazil
1977 Maccabiah	Israel: Emmanuel Scheffer (coach); Amir Liberman; Eli Cohen; Gad Machnes; Gili Landau; Oded Machnes	Netherlands: Simon Cohen	South Africa
1981 Maccabiah	South Africa	United States: Mike Jeffries; Lev Kirshner; Seth Roland	Israel
1985 Maccabiah	Israel	Netherlands	Maccabi Modi'im ^{1}
1989 Maccabiah			
1993 Maccabiah	Israel	Argentina	United States: Seth Roland (coach); Pepper Brill; Amos Magee; Irad Young; Lev Kirshner
1997 Maccabiah	Brazil	Sweden	France/Netherlands
2001 Maccabiah	Argentina: Oliver Lehmann; Guillermo Edelman; Luis Mamed; Nicolas Valansi	Mexico	Israel
2005 Maccabiah	Israel: Shmuel Kozokin; Itai Schechter; Yuval Spungin	United States: Jonathan Bornstein; Michael Erush; Benny Feilhaber; Kevin Friedland; Jordan Gruber; Leonard Krupnik; Matt Reiswerg; Graham Albert; Bret Myers; Dan Shapiro; David Blum; Brian Kuritzsky; Kyle Altman; Jared Goldberg; Justin Meyer	Mexico
2009 Maccabiah	Argentina: Matias Burstein; Rodrigo Kotik; Brian Gips; David Cohen; Andres Loterspil; Kevin Kogan; Nicolas Zuchowicki; Gustavo Umansky; Ariel Salomon; Eitan Silberstein; Nicolas Goldberg; Marcelo Felder; German Zylberberg; Martin Feldman; Ariel Kaplan; Andres Faes; Ezequiel Rubin; Martin Saban; Federico Lipoff; Matias Alazraki	Great Britain: Andrew Goldman; Danny Berliner; Daniel Cole; Guy Helman; Guy Morriss; David Soutar; Michael Sacks; Sam Sloma; Alex Levack; Jonathan Kurrant; Scott Shulton; Craig Ellis; Ben Lauffer; Daniel Stanton; Michael Warwick; Mitch Hahn; Daniel Berg; Paul Hakim; James Gershfield; Matt Stock	Israel: Arik Yanko; Orel Cohen Ne'eman; Abed Elhamid Hatem; Hana Nasser; Osher Zeitun; Sari Falah; Rahamim Daniel; Dor Malihi; Adir Maman; Muayan Halaili; Nir Biton; Barak Moshe; Arthur Atzhianov; Tzahi Elihan; Meir Elkabetz; Ilan Rankovitch; Philipe Abu-Mana; Samir Hakim; Alon Turgeman; Timor Avitan
2013 Maccabiah	United States: David Abidor; Alec Arsht; Ross Friedman; Adam Green; Ryan Jones; Jacob Lissek; Matt Kadoch; Daniel Kohen; Kovi Konowiecki; Max Kurtzman; Evin Nadaner; Jacob Lissek; Jacob Pace; Charlie Paris; Will Pleskow; Drew Rosenberg; David Rosenthal; Scott Rowling; Eric Weberman; Gary Weisbaum; Adam Zernik	Argentina: Nico Mermelstein	Canada: Alon Badat; Arthur Berlin; Alan Chivers; Zion Cohen; Dror David; Kilian Elkinson; Colin Jacques; Jordan Kalk; Liron Lashevsky; Ezequiel Lubbock; Jason Mausberg; Ilya Orlov; Roy Raviv; Brad Rose; Dan Steiner; Zachary Stemer; Benjamin Ur; Gil Vainshtein
2017 Maccabiah	United States	Great Britain	Israel

1. Maccabi Modi'im was a delegation composed of Jewish athletes who couldn't compete under their nation flag, including USSR, Ethiopia, South Africa and Lebanon.
