= Football at the Maccabiah Games =

- Founded: 1932; 94 years ago
- Current champions: United States (3rd title)
- Most championships: Israel (11 titles)

Association football has been included in every Maccabiah Games as a men's competition sport.

== Results ==
=== Men's tournament ===
Year	Host	Gold medal game			Bronze medal game		
Year	Host	Gold	Score	Silver	Bronze	Score	4th place
1932; Details	Mandatory Palestine	Poland	3–2	Mandatory Palestine	Only two nations entered		
1935; Details	Mandatory Palestine	Romania	Group	Germany	Israel	Group	Poland
1950; Details	Israel	Israel	Group	South Africa	United Kingdom	Group	Switzerland
1953; Details	Israel	Israel	Group	South Africa	United Kingdom	Group	France
1957; Details	Israel	Israel	Group	United Kingdom	France	Only three nations entered	
1961; Details	Israel	United Kingdom	Group	Israel	South Africa	Group	Switzerland
1965; Details	Israel	Israel	5–0 (final game)	United Kingdom	Mexico	—N/a	Argentina
1969; Details	Israel	Israel	1–0	Argentina	United Kingdom	6–2	Denmark
1973; Details	Israel	Israel	3–1	Mexico	Brazil	1–0	South Africa
1977	Israel	Israel	6–0	Netherlands	South Africa	2–0	Brazil
1981	Israel	South Africa	3–1	United States	Israel	5–4	United Kingdom
1985	Israel	Israel	3–1	Netherlands	South Africa	4–1	Argentina
1989	Israel	Israel	3–0	Argentina	Brazil	3–0	Netherlands
1993	Israel	Israel	2–1	Argentina	United States	1–0	Mexico
1997	Israel	Brazil	?–?	Sweden	France	Shared	Netherlands
2001	Israel	Argentina	2–1	Mexico	Israel	2–1	Australia
2005	Israel	Israel	2–0	United States	Mexico	2–0	Brazil
2009	Israel	Argentina	1–1 (a.e.t.) (3–2 p)	United Kingdom	Israel	7–1	Mexico
2013	Israel	United States	4–2 (a.e.t.)	Argentina	Canada	3–1	Mexico
2017	Israel	United States	3–0	United Kingdom	Israel	1–1 (5–3 pen.)	Mexico
2022	Israel	Uruguay	3–2	United States	Argentina	2–1	France
2026	Israel	United States	2–1	Argentina	Mexico	3–0	Israel

=== Women's tournament ===
Year	Host	Gold medal game			Bronze medal game		
Year	Host	Gold	Score	Silver	Bronze	Score	4th place
2005	Israel	Israel	2–0	United States	Australia	Only three nations entered	
2009	Israel	United States	4–0	Israel	Canada	—N/a	Brazil
2013	Israel	United States	6–1	Israel	Canada	3–0	Australia
2017	Israel	Israel	2–1	United States	Brazil	7–0	Mexico
2022	Israel	United States	2–1	Israel	Brazil	0–0 (a.e.t.) (4–1 p)	Canada

== Medal table ==
=== Men's medal table ===
- Includes Mandatory Palestine under Israel

Rank	Nation	Gold	Silver	Bronze	Total
1	Israel	11	2	5	18
2	United States	3	3	1	7
3	Argentina	2	5	1	8
4	United Kingdom	1	4	3	8
5	South Africa	1	2	3	6
6	Brazil	1	0	2	3
7	Poland	1	0	0	1
7	Romania	1	0	0	1
7	Uruguay	1	0	0	1
10	Mexico	0	2	3	5
11	Netherlands	0	2	0	2
12	Germany	0	1	0	1
12	Sweden	0	1	0	1
14	France	0	0	2	2
15	Canada	0	0	1	1
Totals (15 entries)		22	22	21	65

=== Women's medal table ===
Rank	Nation	Gold	Silver	Bronze	Total
1	United States	3	2	0	5
2	Israel	2	3	0	5
3	Brazil	0	0	2	2
3	Canada	0	0	2	2
5	Australia	0	0	1	1
Totals (5 entries)		5	5	5	15
