= Football at the 1973 Maccabiah Games =

Tournament details
- Host country: Israel
- Dates: 10 – 16 July
- Teams: 13
- Venues: 16 (in 16 host cities)

Final positions
- Champions: Israel
- Runners-up: Mexico
- Third place: Brazil
- Fourth place: South Africa

Tournament statistics
- Matches played: 27
- Goals scored: 109 (4.04 per match)

Football at the 1973 Maccabiah Games was held in Israel starting on 10 July.

The competition was open for men's teams only. Teams from 13 countries participated. The competition was won by Israel, who was represented by its U-20 team.

As part of the closing ceremony, an exhibition match was played between Israel and Uruguay, which ended with a 2–1 victory to the visitors.

== Format ==
The 13 teams were divided into four groups, one group of four and three groups of three, with each team playing the others once. The top team from each group qualified to the semi-finals, while the second-placed team qualified to the 5th-8th place play-off and the third-placed team qualified to the 9th-12th place play-off. The fourth-placed team in group A (which had four teams) was eliminated.

== First round ==
=== Group A ===
Team	Pld	W	D	L	GF	GA	Pts
Israel	3	2	1	0	21	2	5
Great Britain	3	2	1	0	10	3	5
West Germany	3	1	0	2	2	13	2
Peru	3	0	0	3	2	17	0

10 July 1973
West Germany	2–1	Peru	Sala Stadium, Ashkelon
Great Britain	2–2	Israel	Maccabi Ground, Hadera
11 July 1973
Israel	8–0	Peru	Hapoel Stadium, Dimona
Great Britain	1–0	West Germany|Kiryat Bialik
12 July 1973
Israel	11–0	West Germany	Hapoel Ground, Ra'anana
Great Britain	7–1	Peru	Sala Stadium, Ashkelon

=== Group B ===
Team	Pld	W	D	L	GF	GA	Pts
South Africa	2	2	0	0	5	2	4
Argentina	2	0	1	1	2	3	1
Netherlands	2	0	1	1	2	4	1

10 July 1973
Netherlands	1–1	Argentina	Karmiel
11 July 1973
South Africa	2–1	Argentina	Herzliya
12 July 1973
South Africa	3–1	Netherlands	Maccabi Ground, Afula

=== Group C ===
Team	Pld	W	D	L	GF	GA	Pts
Brazil	2	2	0	0	4	1	4
Denmark	2	1	0	1	3	2	2
United States	2	0	0	2	1	5	0

10 July 1973
Brazil	2–1(Joseph Markus)	United States	Hapoel Ground, Ra'anana
11 July 1973
Brazil	2–0	Denmark	Napoleon Stadium, Acre
12 July 1973
Denmark	3–0	United States	Karmiel

=== Group D ===
Team	Pld	W	D	L	GF	GA	Pts
Mexico	2	2	0	0	7	0	4
Chile	2	0	1	1	3	4	1
Sweden	2	0	1	1	3	9	1

10 July 1973
Chile	3–3	Sweden	Municipal Stadium, Nes Ziona
11 July 1973
Mexico	1–0	Chile	Municipal Stadium, Nazareth
12 July 1973
Mexico	6–0	Sweden	Maccabi Ground, Hadera

== Classification round ==
=== 9th-12th places play-off ===
Classification Semi-finals
15 July 1973, Ra'anana
West Germany	3 (3)
Netherlands	3 (5)
15 July 1973, Ashdod
United States	1
Sweden	0

9th/10th Match
16 July 1973, Petah Tikva
Netherlands	1
United States	0
11th/12th Match
16 July 1973, Petah Tikva
West Germany	3
Sweden	5

=== 5th-8th places play-off ===
Classification Semi-finals
15 July 1973, Ashkelon
Great Britain	2
Argentina	0
15 July 1973, Petah Tikva
Denmark	3
Chile	0

5th/6th Match
16 July 1973, Hadera
Great Britain	2
Denmark	1
7th/8th Match
16 July 1973, Ra'anana
Argentina	5
Chile	3

== Medals round ==
=== Semi-finals ===
15 July 1973

Israel	4–0	South Africa
Masuari 2', 53', 77'; Peretz 84'	Summary

Green Stadium, Nazareth Illit
Attendance: 1500
Referee: Yosef Bachar

15 July 1973

Brazil	1–2	Mexico
Zatraka 40' (pen.)	Summary	Marcado 20'; Siton

Maccabi Ground, Hadera
Referee: G. Cohen

=== 3rd-4th place match ===
16 July 1973

South Africa	0–1	Brazil
	Summary	Nadelberg 55'

Vasermil Stadium, Be'er Sheva
Attendance: 700
Referee: Moshe Braun

=== Final ===
17 July 1973

Israel	3–1	Mexico
Ta-Shma 11' (pen.); Masuari 38'; Peretz 50'	Summary	Yosef Cherem 34'

Yud-Alef Stadium, Ashdod
Attendance: 3000
Referee: Jack Taylor

== Final ranking ==
R	Team	P	W	D	L	GF	GA	GD	Pts.
1	Israel	5	4	1	0	28	3	+25	9
2	Mexico	4	3	0	1	10	4	+6	6
3	Brazil	4	3	0	1	6	3	+3	6
4	South Africa	4	2	0	2	5	7	-2	4
5	Great Britain	5	4	1	0	14	4	10	9
6	Denmark	4	2	0	2	7	4	+3	4
7	Argentina	4	1	1	2	7	8	-1	3
8	Chile	4	0	1	3	6	12	-6	1
9	Netherlands	4	1	2	1	6	7	-1	4
10	United States	4	1	0	3	2	6	-4	2
11	Sweden	4	1	1	2	8	13	-5	3
12	West Germany	5	1	1	3	8	21	-13	3
Eliminated at group stage
13	Peru	3	0	0	3	2	17	-15	0
