= Shlomo Levi =

Israeli footballer (1934–2003)

Shlomo Levi שְׁלֹמֹה לֵוִי
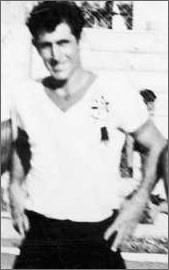
- Shlomo Levi for Maccabi Haifa F.C.

Personal information
- Full name: Shlomo Levi
- Date of birth: 1 June 1934
- Date of death: 1 May 2003 (aged 68)
- Place of death: Israel
- Position: Striker

Youth career
- 1947–1949: Maccabi Tel Aviv

Senior career*
Years	Team	Apps	(Gls)
1954–1955	Hakoah Tel Aviv		
1955–1958	Maccabi Haifa	46	(26)
1959–1962	Hapoel Haifa	60	(46)
1962–1965	Hapoel Ramat Gan	100	(64)
1966–1968	Maccabi Hadera		
1969	Montreal Hakoah		
1970–1971	Montreal Superga		

International career
1960–1964	Israel	14	(6)

Managerial career
- 1972–1973: Hapoel Kafr Qasim
- * Club domestic league appearances and goals

Shlomo Levi (Hebrew: שְׁלֹמֹה לֵוִי) was an Israeli footballer, who played for Maccabi Haifa, Hapoel Haifa and Hapoel Ramat Gan, among others, and for Israel

== Career ==
=== League football ===
Levi played football for Maccabi Tel Aviv from the age of 13. When he was 15 he sustained an injury during play and was told to quit football for life. While in army service, Levi participated in IDF Chief of Staff cup, which led to signing with Hakoah Tel Aviv.

In 1955, Levi transferred to Maccabi Haifa, where he played until 1958, at which point Levi put himself in "quarantine", a period of 12 months away from football after which he would be a free agent. At the end of the year, Levi signed with Hapoel Haifa, With whom Levi was the league's joint-top scorer in 1960–61 and 1961–62.

In 1963, Levi transferred to Hapoel Ramat Gan, which played in the second division. The club topped the league that season and won promotion to Liga Leumit. The following season, the club won the championship, with Levi being the top scorer for the club, with 14 goals. In 1966, Levi was released, on his request from Hapoel Ramat Gan, and at first signed with Hapoel Kfar Saba, but a few days later signed with Maccabi Hadera.

In 1968, Levi immigrated to Canada, where he stayed for four years, playing in the Canadian National Soccer League with local teams Montreal Hakoah and Superga, with whom he won the Quebec cup competition. Levi returned to Israel in 1972 and tried his hand in coaching at Hapoel Kafr Qasim, but retired from football after the season ended.

=== National team ===
Levi was part of the Israel team in the 1957 Maccabiah Games, which won the gold medal, scoring 7 goals. Levi was called to the national team ahead of the 1960 AFC Asian Cup and played his debut with the team in the first match of the tournament, against South Korea. Levi scored his first goal for the national team in the tournament's second match, against South Vietnam and added another goal in Israel's final match against the Republic of China, which secured Israel second place for the tournament.

Levi took part in Israel's campaign during 1962 World Cup qualification, scoring a hat-trick against Cyprus. In 1964, Levi was part of the squad for the 1964 AFC Asian Cup, as Israel won the tournament.

== Career statistics ==
=== International goals ===
#	Date	Venue	Opponent	Score	Result	Competition
1.	19 October 1960	Hyochang Stadium, Seoul, South Korea	South Vietnam	5–1	Won	1960 AFC Asian Cup
2.	23 October 1960	Hyochang Stadium, Seoul, South Korea	Taiwan	1–0	Won	1960 AFC Asian Cup
3.	27 November 1960	National Stadium, Ramat Gan, Israel	Cyprus	6–1	Won	1962 World Cup qual.
4.	27 November 1960	National Stadium, Ramat Gan, Israel	Cyprus	6–1	Won	1962 World Cup qual.
5.	27 November 1960	National Stadium, Ramat Gan, Israel	Cyprus	6–1	Won	1962 World Cup qual.
6.	9 November 1961	Elland Road, Leeds, England	England U23	7–1	Lost	Friendly
Correct as of 6 October 2015

== Honours ==
=== Hapoel Ramat Gan ===
- Israeli Premier League (1):1963–64
- Liga Alef (second division) (1): 1962–63

=== Montreal Superga ===
- Quebec Cup (1): 1971

=== International ===
==== Israel ====
- AFC Asian Cup (1): 1964
- Football at the Maccabiah Games (1): 1957

==== Individual ====
- Israeli Premier League – Top Goalscorer (2): 1960–61, 1961–62
