= Daniel Cole =

Daniel, Danny or Dan Cole may refer to:

- Dan Cole (rugby union) (born 1987), English rugby union player
- Dan H. Cole (1811–1881), American politician
- Dan Cole (musician), lead singer and guitarist for Forever Changed
- Dan Cole, host of a radio sports show on KFXN-FM
- Daniel Cole (footballer), UK footballer and Maccabiah medalist
- Danny Cole (born 2000), American painter and interdisciplinary artist
- Danny Cole, magician and Academy of Magical Arts Award Winner
- Danny Cole, musician in the band Creepy

== See also ==
- Danny Coles, English footballer
