= Quillabamba =

- City
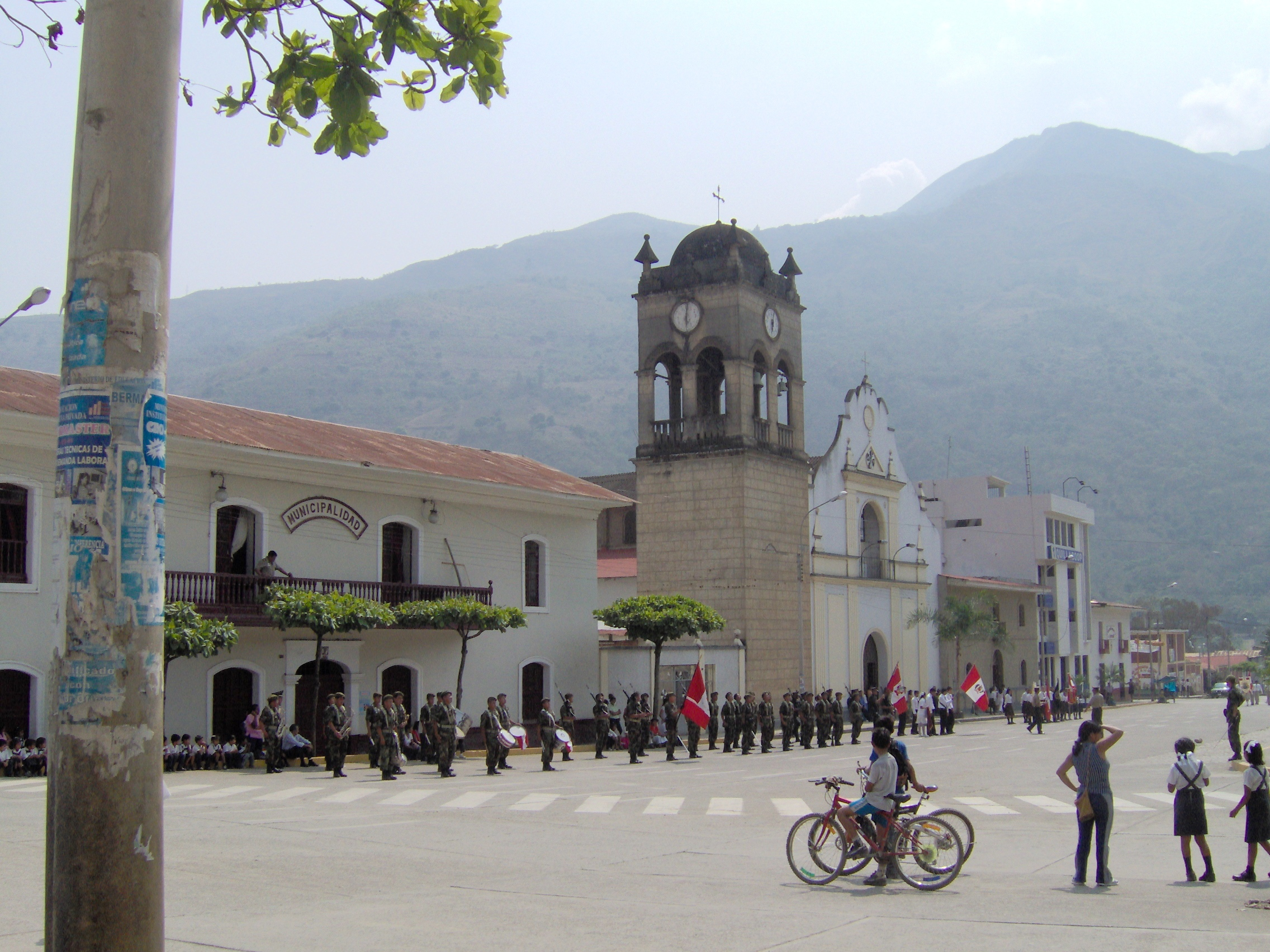
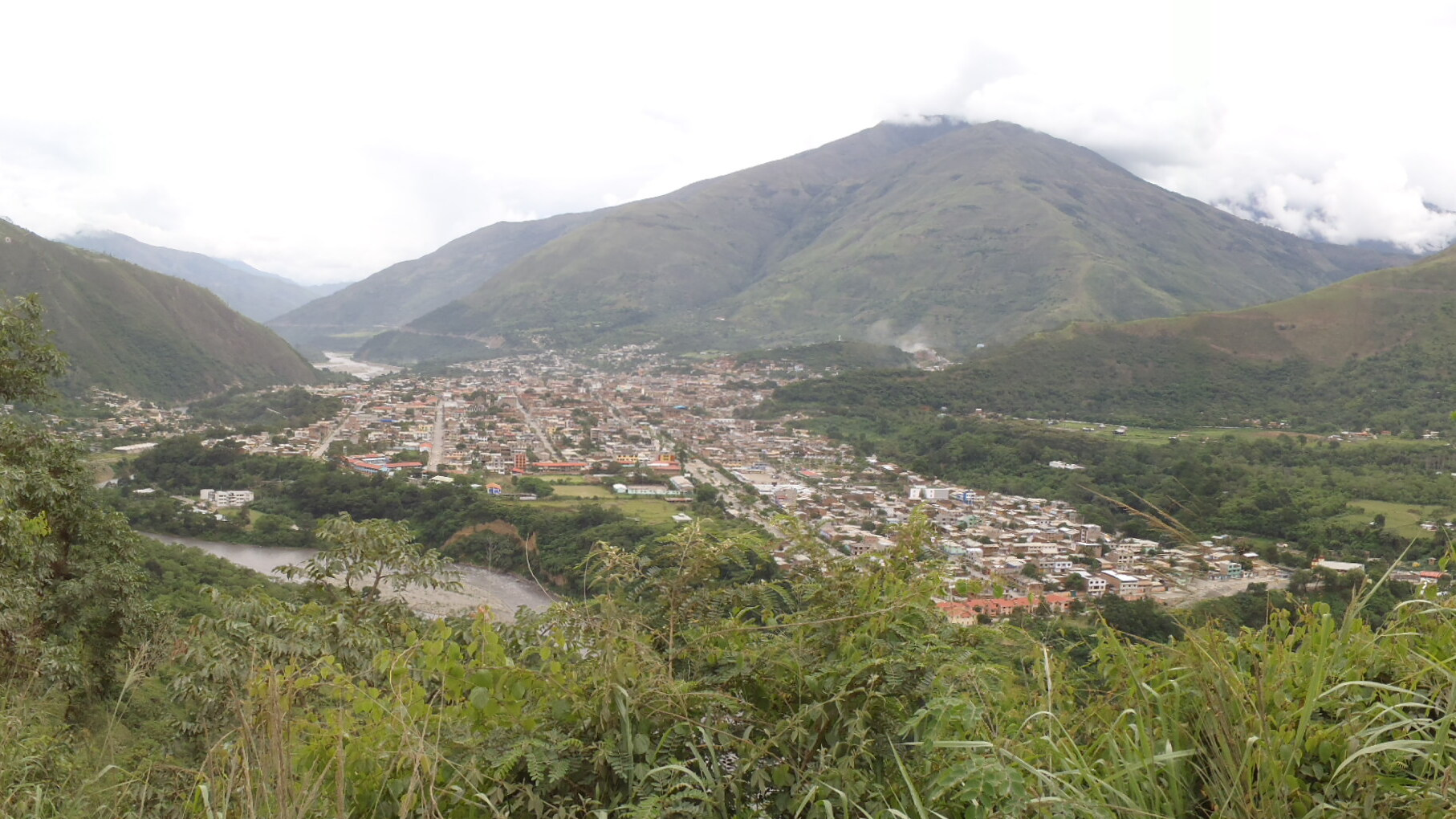
- Center of the town of Quillabamba View of Quillabamba city

- Location within Peru
- Coordinates: 12°52′05″S 72°41′35″W
- Country: Peru
- Region: Cuzco
- Province: La Convención
- District: Santa Ana
- Founded: 25 July 1857

Government
  - Mayor: Master Alex Curi Leon
- Elevation: 1,050 m (3,440 ft)

Population
  - Estimate (2024): 61,119
- Time zone: UTC-5 (PET)

Quillabamba is a city in southern Peru. It is the capital of La Convención Province, which is the largest province in area of the Cusco Region. It is located in an area called the high jungle. Agriculture is the most important activity, principally coffee, cacao, tea and coca. The town is a mixture of Andean and Amazonian migrants.

The Urubamba River flows by the town from the south. It is a source of gold and rare-earth minerals.

== Climate ==
Climate data for Quillabamba, elevation 1,001 m (3,284 ft), (1991–2020)
Month	Jan	Feb	Mar	Apr	May	Jun	Jul	Aug	Sep	Oct	Nov	Dec	Year
Mean daily maximum °C (°F)	30.0 (86.0)	29.6 (85.3)	30.0 (86.0)	30.2 (86.4)	30.3 (86.5)	30.4 (86.7)	30.5 (86.9)	31.6 (88.9)	32.0 (89.6)	31.9 (89.4)	31.5 (88.7)	30.2 (86.4)	30.7 (87.2)
Mean daily minimum °C (°F)	19.6 (67.3)	19.4 (66.9)	19.4 (66.9)	19.3 (66.7)	18.6 (65.5)	17.7 (63.9)	16.8 (62.2)	17.9 (64.2)	18.7 (65.7)	19.2 (66.6)	19.7 (67.5)	19.6 (67.3)	18.8 (65.9)
Average precipitation mm (inches)	157.8 (6.21)	176.6 (6.95)	150.2 (5.91)	77.0 (3.03)	31.2 (1.23)	14.9 (0.59)	17.9 (0.70)	28.0 (1.10)	32.7 (1.29)	84.0 (3.31)	75.7 (2.98)	126.6 (4.98)	972.6 (38.28)
Source: National Meteorology and Hydrology Service of Peru

== Notable Resident ==
- Raul Geller (born 1936), Peruvian-Israeli footballer

== See also ==
- Chukchu
