= Raul Geller =

Peruvian-Israeli footballer (born 1936)

Raul Geller ראול גלר
Personal information
- Date of birth: 23 January 1936 (age 90)
- Place of birth: Quillabamba, Peru
- Position: Forward

Youth career
- Deportivo Municipal

Senior career*
Years	Team	Apps	(Gls)
1956–1957	Deportivo Municipal		
1960–1964	Porvenir Miraflores		
1965–1969	Beitar Jerusalem		

International career
1964	Peru		
- * Club domestic league appearances and goals

Dr. Raul Geller (Hebrew: ראול גלר; born 23 January 1936) is a Peruvian-Israeli former professional footballer, who played as a forward, and an orthopaedic surgeon. In Peru he played for Deportivo Municipal, Porvenir Miraflores, and the Peru national football team. In Israel, he is the third-leading scorer of all time of Beitar Jerusalem. His 0.64 goals per game ranks first. He also competed in soccer in the 1969 Maccabiah Games. In 2013, Geller was ranked #161 in the world in 75+ tennis by the International Tennis Federation.

== Early life ==
Geller was born in Quillabamba, Peru. His father Marcus (Mordechai) played football in Poland, and fled it before the Holocaust to Peru. Geller as a child was a member of the youth movements Beitar and HaNoar HaTzioni. When he was 13, he and his family moved to Lima, Peru.

== Career ==
Geller was a midfielder in football. He played in Peru for Deportivo Municipal (1956–1959), Porvenir Miraflores (1960–1964), and for the Peru national football team at the 1964 Copa América.

He emigrated to Israel in January 1965. Geller played football in Israel for Beitar Jerusalem (1965–1970; scoring 41 goals in 1966–67 and helping the club gain promotion to the Israeli top division). In 1971 he returned to the club for half a season. He is the third -leading scorer of all time of Beitar Jerusalem. His 0.64 goals per game ranks first.

Geller competed in the 1969 Maccabiah Games. He played football at the 1969 Maccabiah Games for Peru, which came in 8th.

Geller worked as an orthopaedic surgeon at Hadassah Ein Kerem, specialising in sports injuries.

In 2013, Geller was ranked #161 in the world in 75+ tennis by the International Tennis Federation.
