= Santa Ana District, La Convención =

Coordinates: 12.8772°S 72.7003°W

Santa Ana District
- District
- Interactive map of Santa Ana District
- Country: Peru
- Region: Cusco
- Province: La Convención
- Capital: Quillabamba

Government
  - Mayor: Hernan De La Torre Dueñas

Area
  - Total: 359.4 km^{2} (138.8 sq mi)
- Elevation: 1,047 m (3,435 ft)

Population (2017)
  - Total: 27,999
  - Density: 77.90/km^{2} (201.8/sq mi)
- Time zone: UTC-5 (PET)
- UBIGEO: 080901

Santa Ana District is one of ten districts of the province La Convención in Peru.

== Climate ==
Climate data for Quillabamba, Santa Ana, elevation 1,001 m (3,284 ft), (1991–2020)
Month	Jan	Feb	Mar	Apr	May	Jun	Jul	Aug	Sep	Oct	Nov	Dec	Year
Mean daily maximum °C (°F)	30.0 (86.0)	29.6 (85.3)	30.0 (86.0)	30.2 (86.4)	30.3 (86.5)	30.4 (86.7)	30.5 (86.9)	31.6 (88.9)	32.0 (89.6)	31.9 (89.4)	31.5 (88.7)	30.2 (86.4)	30.7 (87.2)
Mean daily minimum °C (°F)	19.6 (67.3)	19.4 (66.9)	19.4 (66.9)	19.3 (66.7)	18.6 (65.5)	17.7 (63.9)	16.8 (62.2)	17.9 (64.2)	18.7 (65.7)	19.2 (66.6)	19.7 (67.5)	19.6 (67.3)	18.8 (65.9)
Average precipitation mm (inches)	157.8 (6.21)	176.6 (6.95)	150.2 (5.91)	77.0 (3.03)	31.2 (1.23)	14.9 (0.59)	17.9 (0.70)	28.0 (1.10)	32.7 (1.29)	84.0 (3.31)	75.7 (2.98)	126.6 (4.98)	972.6 (38.28)
Source: National Meteorology and Hydrology Service of Peru
