= Vitali Pushkar =

Israeli swimmer (born 1983)

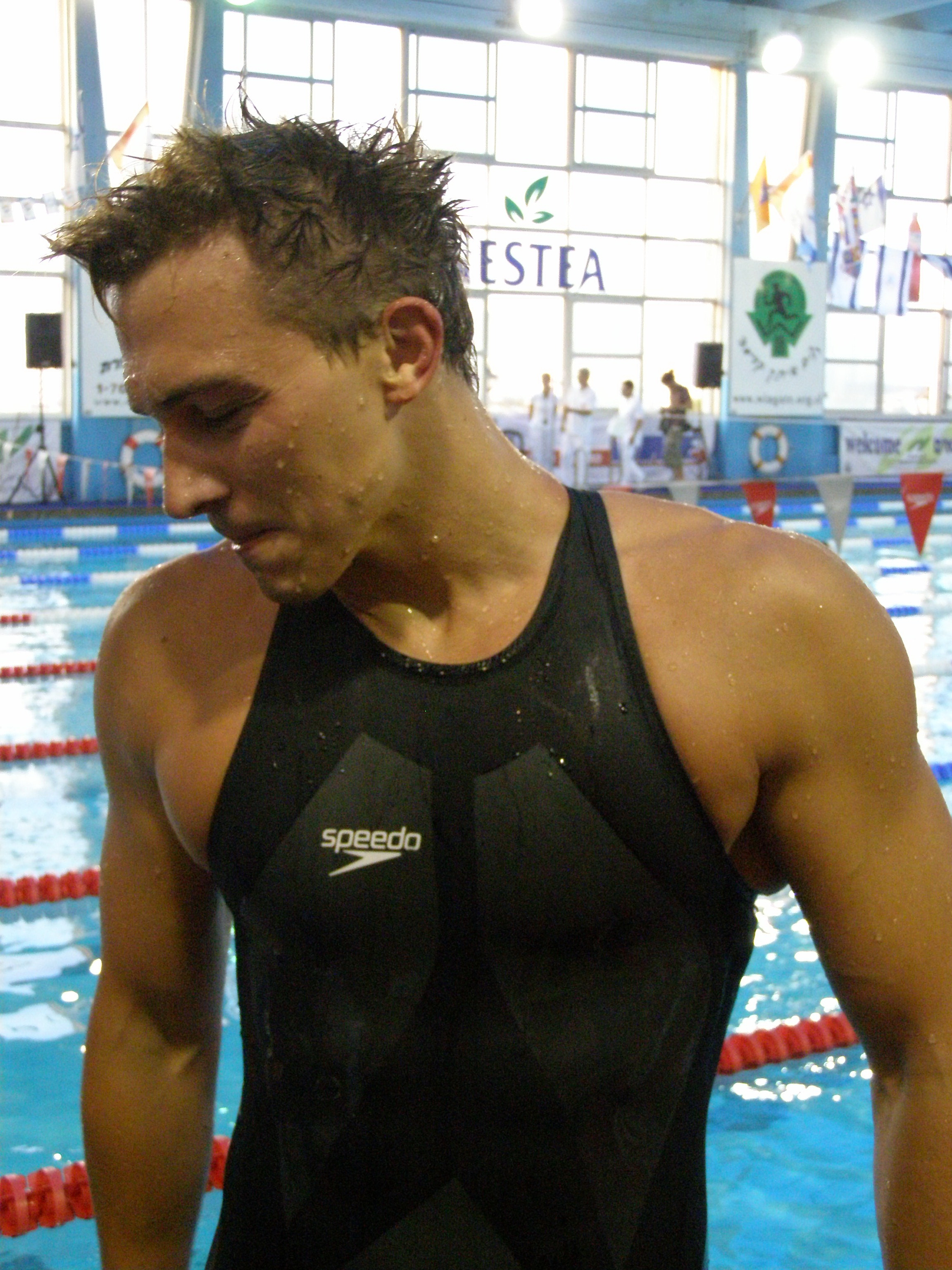
- Vitali Pushkar at the Maccabiah Games 07/2009

Personal information
- Native name: ויטלי פושקר
- Full name: Vitali Pushkar
- Nickname: "V"
- Nationality: Israel
- Born: January 5, 1983 (age 43) Ukraine

Sport
- Sport: Swimming
- Strokes: Freestyle
- Club: Hapoel Jerusalem
- College team: SCAD
Medal record
Maccabiah Games
Silver medal – second place	2009 Israel	50m Freestyle

Vitali Pushkar (Hebrew: ויטלי פושקר; born January 5, 1983) is an Israeli swimmer.

Pushkar was the Israeli Champion in the 50 freestyle and 100 freestyle disciplines. At the 2009 Maccabiah Games, Pushkar won the silver in the 50m freestyle behind Jason Lezak.

Vitali was born in Ukraine and started to swim when he was 8 years old. Both of Vitali's parents were swimmers and when the time came to decide what sport Vitali will do, it was swimming, even though Vitali himself always wanted to play professional tennis. When Vitali was 10 him and his family decided to move to Israel. At the age of 11 Vitali won his first Nationals for his age group in 50,100 and 200 freestyle. Vitali had been and Israeli National champion in all group ages and broke several Israeli records for his age group. He also had been an Israeli National Champion in 50 fly, 50 back and 50 free for all age groups in years 2003–2005.

After graduating from high school Vitali went to the military where he spent 3 years in air force base while swimming during his service. After his service he decided to go to USA to colleges for high education and swimming. His freshman year Vitali spent in Utah, Salt Lake City. After his freshman year he transferred to SCAD(Savannah College of Art and Design) located in GA. Vitali is majoring in Architecture and Electronic Design. Currently holding school records in 100 fly.

Vitali graduated with Masters of Architecture from Savannah College of Art and Design in 2013.
