= Football at the 1969 Maccabiah Games =

Tournament details
- Host country: Israel
- Dates: 29 July – 5 August
- Teams: 14
- Venue(s): 12 (in 12 host cities)

Final positions
- Champions: Israel
- Runners-up: Argentina
- Third place: Great Britain
- Fourth place: Denmark

Tournament statistics
- Matches played: 26
- Goals scored: 83 (3.19 per match)

Football at the 1969 Maccabiah Games was held in Israel starting on 29 July.

The competition was open for men's teams only. Teams from 14 countries participated. The competition was won by Israel.

As part of the closing ceremony, an exhibition match was played between Israel and River Plate, which ended goalless.

== Format ==
The 14 teams were divided into four groups, two groups of four and two of three. Each team playing the others once. The top team from each group qualified to the semi-finals, while the second-placed team qualified to the 5th-8th place play-off. The other teams in each group were eliminated.

== First round ==
=== Group A ===
Team	Pld	W	D	L	GF	GA	Pts
Israel	3	2	1	0	8	1	5
Brazil	3	1	1	1	2	5	3
France	3	1	0	2	4	5	2
Italy	3	0	2	1	1	4	2

29 July 1969
Israel	1–1	Brazil	Maccabi Ground, Hadera
France	3–0	Italy	Hapoel Ground, Kfar Saba
30 July 1969
Brazil	1–0	France	Municipal Stadium, Bat Yam
Italy	0–0	Israel	Municipal Stadium, Ashdod
1 August 1969
Italy	1–1	Brazil	Hapoel Ground, Ra'anana
Israel	4–1	France	Municipal Stadium, Ness Ziona

=== Group B ===
Team	Pld	W	D	L	GF	GA	Pts
Great Britain	3	2	0	1	9	3	4
West Germany	3	2	0	1	7	5	4
Chile	3	1	1	1	5	5	3
Sweden	3	0	1	2	4	12	1

29 July 1969
Great Britain	3–0	West Germany	Municipal Stadium, Ness Ziona
Sweden	2–2	Chile	Municipal Stadium, Tiberias
30 July 1969
West Germany	2–0	Chile	Maccabi Ground, Hadera
Great Britain	5–0	Sweden	Hapoel Ground, Kfar Saba
1 August 1969
West Germany	5–2	Sweden	Hapoel Ground, Kfar Saba
Chile	3–1	Great Britain	Maccabi Ground, Hadera

=== Group C ===
Team	Pld	W	D	L	GF	GA	Pts
Denmark	2	2	0	0	4	1	4
Mexico	2	1	0	1	2	3	2
Netherlands	2	0	0	2	0	2	0

29 July 1969
Mexico	1–0	Netherlands	Hapoel Ground, Ra'anana
30 July 1969
Denmark	3–1	Mexico	Municipal Stadium, Ness Ziona
1 August 1969
Denmark	1–0	Netherlands	Municipal Stadium, Bat Yam

=== Group D ===
Team	Pld	W	D	L	GF	GA	Pts
Argentina	2	2	0	0	6	0	4
Peru	2	1	0	1	6	4	2
United States	2	0	0	2	1	9	0

29 July 1969
Argentina	3–0	Peru	Municipal Stadium, Bat Yam
30 July 1969
Argentina	3–0	United States	Municipal Stadium, Nazareth
1 August 1969
Peru	6–1	United States	Sala Stadium, Ashkelon

== Knockout round ==
=== 5th-8th places play-off ===
==== Semi-finals ====
3 August 1969

Brazil	0–0	Mexico
	Summary
Penalties
	1–3

Municipal Stadium, Ness Ziona
Referee: Emile Prohaski

3 August 1969

West Germany	1–0	Peru
Efroni 12'	Summary

Hapoel Ground, Ra'anana
Attendance: 200
Referee: Yosefson

==== 7th-8th place match ====
4 August 1969

Brazil	5–2	Peru
Rosenthal 7'; Roberto 20'; Meirson 21'; Hino 48', 86'	Summary	Geller 16'; Rolf 44' (pen.)

Municipal Stadium, Ness Ziona
Attendance: 200
Referee: Isaac Cohen

==== 5th-6th place match ====
4 August 1969

Mexico	1–0	West Germany
Ballas 70'	Summary

Hapoel Ground, Ra'anana

=== Championship play-off ===
==== Semi-finals ====
3 August 1969

Israel	4–1	Denmark
Rubinstein 33', 39'; Asayag 40'; Damti 89'	Summary	Abutbul 51' (pen.)

Municipal Stadium, Safed
Attendance: 1500
Referee: Schwalb

3 August 1969

Great Britain	0–1	Argentina
	Summary	Gold 13'

Hapoel Ground, Nahariya
Attendance: 3000
Referee: Yosipovich

==== 3rd-4th place match ====
4 August 1969

Denmark	2–6	Great Britain
Lazar 4'; Gibori 19'	Summary	Taylor 13', 17', 67', 70'; Avramson 78', 80'

Hapoel Ground, Kfar Saba
Attendance: 400
Referee: Aharon Shoshani

==== Final ====
5 August 1969

Israel	1–0	Argentina
Rubinstein 65'	Summary

Vasermil Stadium, Be'er Sheva
Attendance: 3000
Referee: Jack Taylor

== Final ranking ==
R	Team	P	W	D	L	GF	GA	GD	Pts.
1	Israel	5	4	1	0	13	2	+11	9
2	Argentina	4	3	0	1	7	1	+6	6
3	Great Britain	5	3	0	2	15	6	+9	6
4	Denmark	4	2	0	2	7	11	-4	4
5	Mexico	4	2	1	1	3	3	0	5
6	West Germany	5	3	0	2	8	6	+2	6
7	Brazil	5	2	2	1	7	7	0	6
8	Peru	4	1	0	3	8	10	-2	2
Eliminated at group stage
9	Chile	3	1	1	1	5	5	0	3
10	France	3	1	0	2	4	5	-1	2
11	Italy	3	0	2	1	1	4	-3	1
12	Sweden	3	0	1	2	4	12	-8	1
13	Netherlands	2	0	0	2	0	2	-2	0
14	United States	2	0	0	2	1	9	-8	0
