= 2009 Maccabiah Games =

18th edition of Jewish multi-sport event

18th Maccabiah
- לגעת ברגעים גדולים; Touched by Greatness
- Host city: Tel Aviv, Israel
- Nations: 55
- Debuting countries: Grenada; Kazakhstan; Palau; Slovenia; Uzbekistan
- Athletes: 9,000
- Opening: July 12, 2009
- Closing: July 24, 2009
- Torchbearer: Jason Lezak
- Main venue: Ramat Gan Stadium

The 18th Maccabiah Games (Hebrew: המכביה ה-18 ישראל תשס"ט), were held in July 2009. According to the organizing committee these were the largest games held yet. These Games were the world's fifth-largest sporting event, behind the Olympic Games, Commonwealth Games, World Police and Fire Games, and Universiade. On the 13 July, more than 6,000 Jewish athletes from all over the world joined Team Israel's 3,000 participants at the Ramat Gan Stadium in Tel Aviv District, Israel, for the opening ceremony. American swimmer Jason Lezak was given the honor of lighting the Maccabiah torch at the Opening Ceremony.

== History ==
The Maccabiah Games were first held in 1932. In 1961, they were declared a "Regional Sports Event" by, and under the auspices and supervision of, the International Olympic Committee. Among other Olympic and world champions, swimmer Mark Spitz won 10 Maccabiah gold medals before earning his first of nine Olympic gold medals.

The Maccabiah Games are open to Jewish athletes from around the world, as well as to all Israeli athletes regardless of ethnicity or religion. Arab Israelis have also competed in it.

== Notable competitors ==
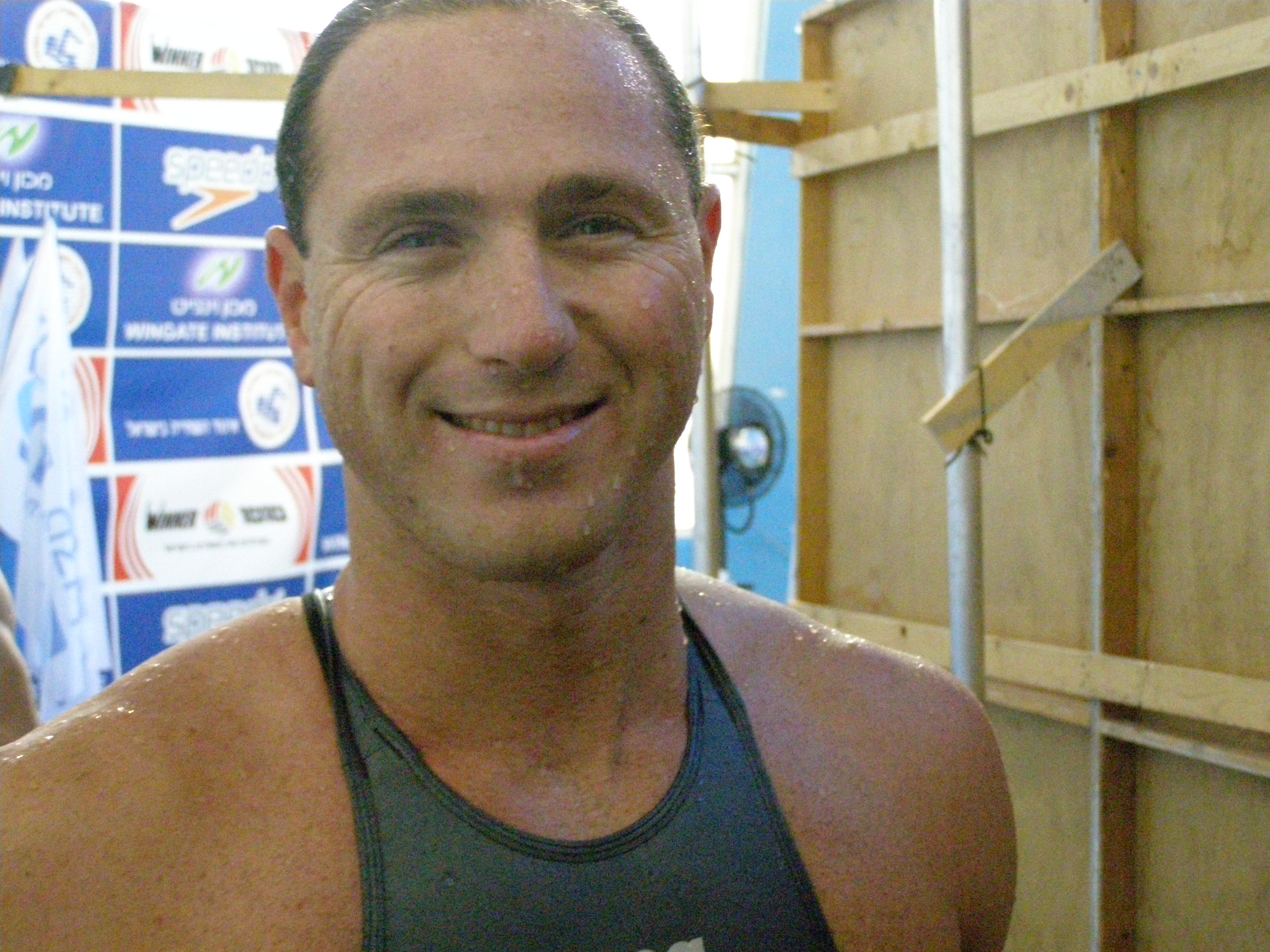
Jason Lezak at the Games.

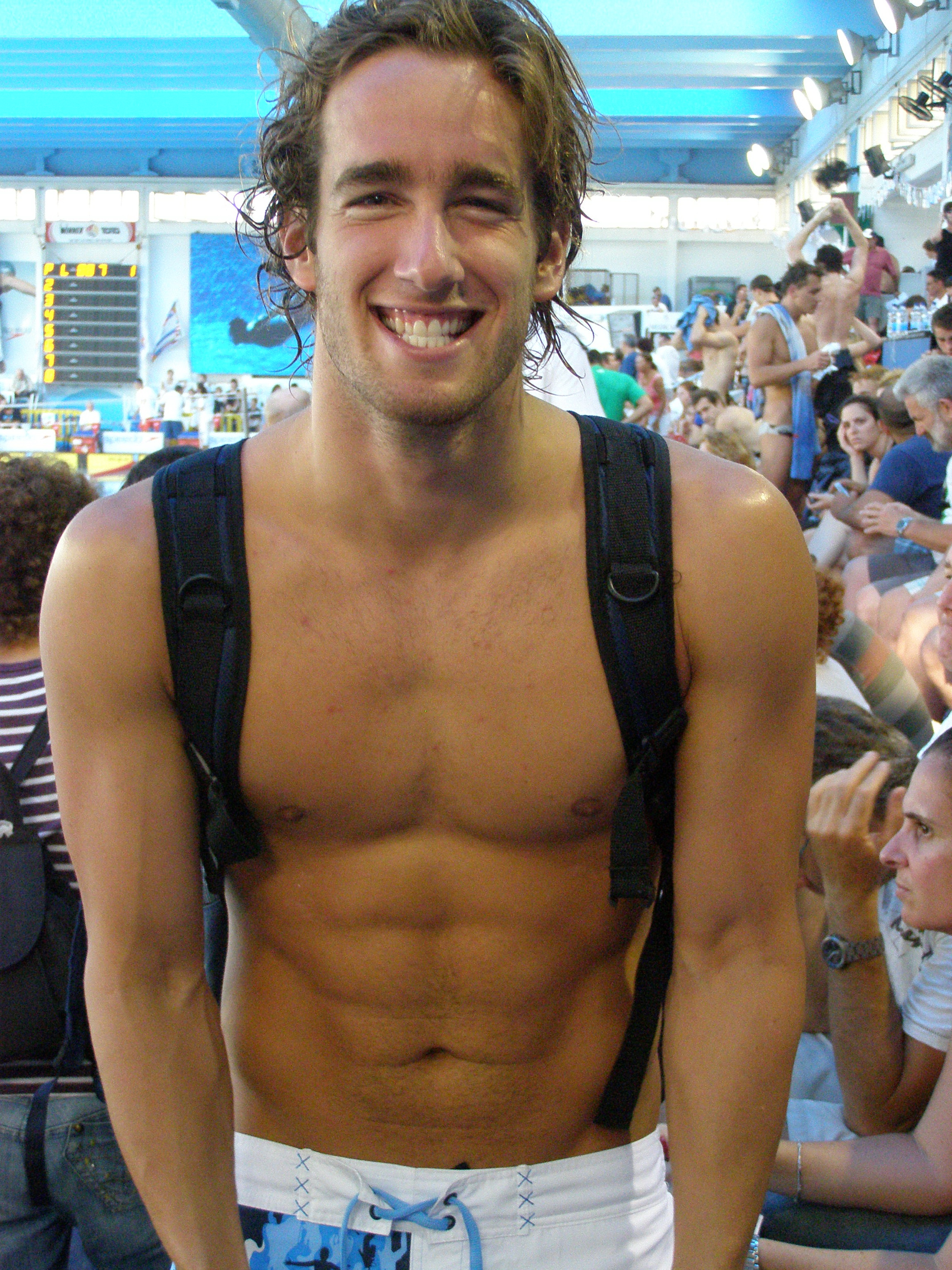
Guy Barnea at the Games.

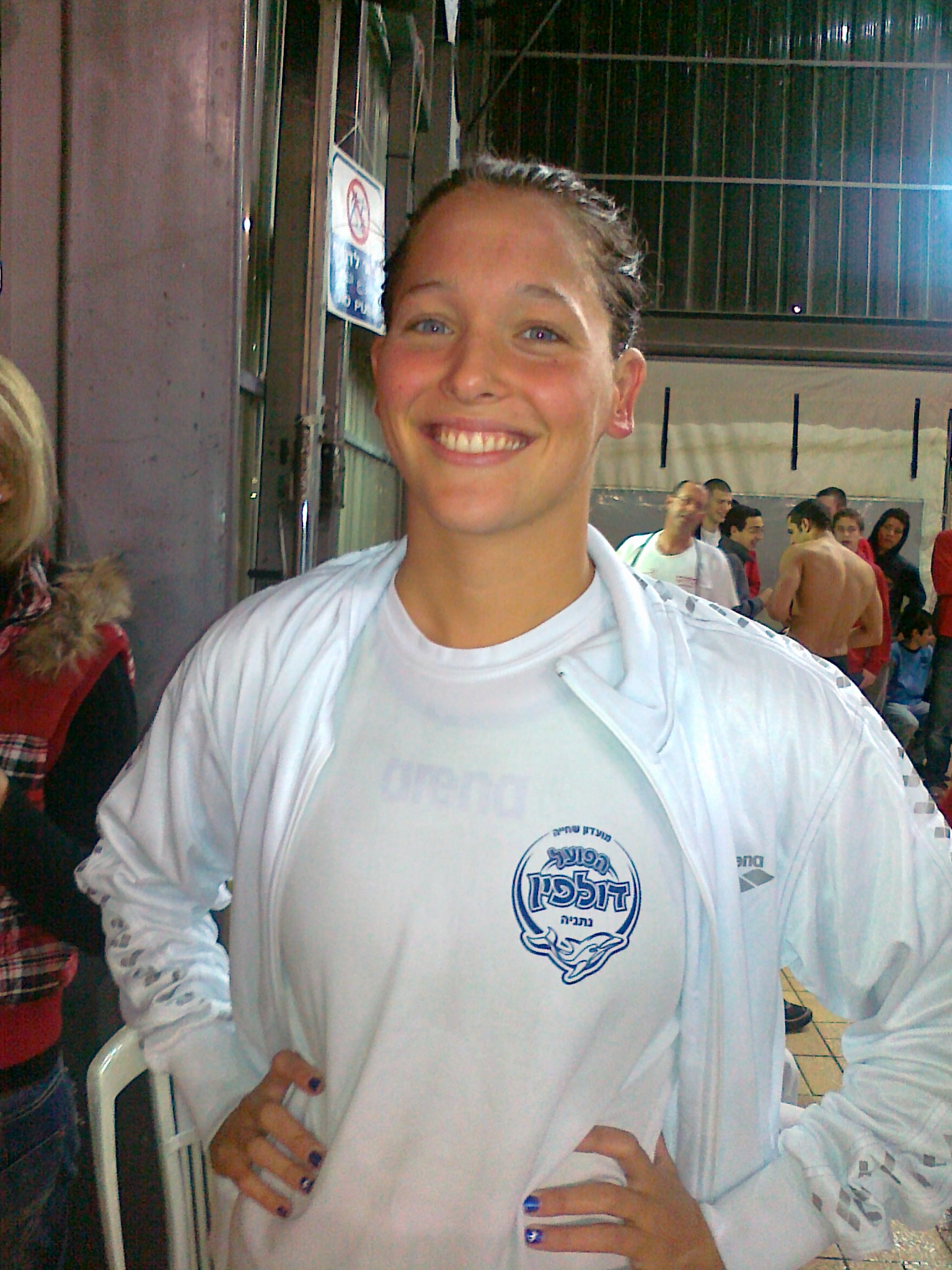
Keren Siebner

Greco-Roman former world champion wrestler Lindsey Durlacher was the flagbearer for the US, and Olympic pole vaulter Jillian Schwartz, who later won a gold medal, was one of the US banner bearers.

American Max Fried, who in 2017 became a major league baseball player with the Atlanta Braves, won a gold medal with the Team USA Juniors baseball team.

US Olympic and world champion swimmer Jason Lezak won four gold medals (in the 50m freestyle, 100m freestyle, 4 × 100 m freestyle relay, and 4 × 100 m medley relay), while setting four Maccabiah records, and was named the most outstanding male athlete of the Games. American basketball players Dan Grunfeld led the US Open Men's Basketball team, which included Bryan Cohen and Zack Rosen, to a gold medal over Israel, as college basketball coach Bruce Pearl coached the team, assisted by Doug Gottlieb. American swimmer Andrea Murez won nine medals (five gold and four silver), breaking all-time Maccabiah Games records while winning gold medals in four individual events: 50m freestyle (26.44); 100m freestyle (0:56.44); 200m freestyle (2:03:45); and 200m Individual Medley (2:20.74), and earned her 5th gold medal anchoring the USA 4 × 100m Freestyle Relay team, which set an all-time Maccabiah Games record (3:53:55).

Israeli swimmers who won gold medals were future Olympian Amit Ivry in the Women's 100m butterfly (with a time of 58.50), Keren Siebner in the 4 × 200 m freestyle and the 4 × 100 m medley, Guy Barnea in the Men's 100m backstroke (with a time of 54.22, setting a new Maccabiah Games record and Israeli record), Gal Nevo in the 400m medley, Olympian Michael Halika in the 200 m individual medley, and Alon Mandel in the 100m butterfly (setting a new Maccabiah Games record of 52.99 seconds). Israeli swimmers who won silver medals included Nimrod Shapira Bar-Or in the 100m freestyle (49.02; behind Jason Lezak, and a new Israeli record) and Vitali Pushkar in the 50m freestyle behind Jason Lezak.

Israeli judokas Or Sasson, a future Olympic bronze medalist, and Golan Pollack, a future world championship bronze medalist, won gold medals at −100 kg and half lightweight (under 66 kg), and Gili Cohen won a bronze medal. Israeli judokas Yarden Gerbi, a future world champion and Olympic bronze medalist, and Gregory Rudelson won silver medals. Brazilian judoka and future world championship silver medalist and Olympic bronze medalist Felipe Kitadai won a bronze medal at U60, beating Lindsey Durlacher along the way. Aaron Cohen won a bronze medal for the United States.

Israeli champion and future Olympian Laetitia Beck won an individual gold medal and a team gold medal in golf at the Games. Israeli fencers who won gold medals were Olympians Tomer Or in men's foil, and Ayelet Ohayon in women's team foil.

Israeli gymnast and future Olympian Valeria Maksyuta won gold on the vault, and silver medals in the all-around and on the uneven bars. Israeli gymnast and future Olympian Alexander Shatilov won four gold medals and two silver medals. Hungarian gymnast Orsolya Nagy won a bronze medal; also a fencer, she won a bronze medal in the individual sabre event at the 2009 World Fencing Championships.

Israeli runner and future Olympian Maor Tiyouri was the silver medalist in the 1500m and a bronze medalist in the 800m. Russian Olympian Igor Pavlov won the gold medal in the pole vault. Israeli Olympic pole vaulter Alex Averbuch also competed in the Games.

In football, Sam Sloma won a silver medal with Great Britain. Israelis Timor Avitan, Nir Bitton, Tzahi Elihen, Sari Falah, Muayan Halaili, Adir Maman, Barak Moshe, Alon Turgeman, Arik Yanko, Osher Zeitun, and Hana Nasser won a bronze medal in football. Zac MacMath and Kyle Altman competed for Team USA in football. Alon Badat, Gil Vainshtein, and Felix Gelt competed for Canada. Steven Solomon competed for Australia as captain of its junior soccer team. Barry Silkman played football for the gold medal-winning 45-plus Team GB.

Bensiyon Songavkar played for Team India and won a silver medal in cricket. Jason Molins, Mark Bott, and Darren Gerard played for the UK in cricket.

Chess grandmaster Judit Polgár from Hungary, the number 1 rated woman in the world, was named the Maccabiah's most outstanding female athlete of the Games. Russian chess grandmaster Ian Nepomniachtchi, later ranked fourth in the world, won a gold medal, and Israeli grandmaster Boris Gelfand and Slovenian grandmaster Alexander Beliavsky competed in the tournament. Russian grandmaster Evgeny Najer won the rapid tournament in Netanya, ahead of Nepomniachtchi, Beliavsky, Gelfand, Judit Polgar, and Ukrainian grandmaster Pavel Eljanov. German grandmaster Daniel Fridman also competed in chess.

American Brian L. Roberts won a silver medal in squash. Zach Test and Shawn Lipman played for the US Maccabiah rugby union team, winning a bronze medal.

Ukrainian future world championship silver medalist Vasyl Fedoryshyn competed in wrestling. Canadian Olympic wrestler David Zilberman competed as well.

Canadian volleyball player and future Olympian Josh Binstock competed for Canada.

== Participating communities ==
*Reference.

- Argentina (330)
- Australia (800)
- Austria
- Azerbaijan
- Belgium
- Brazil (390)
- Canada (400)
- Chile
- Colombia
- Costa Rica
- Czech Republic
- Denmark
- Estonia
- Finland
- France
- Georgia
- Germany
- Greece
- Grenada
- Guatemala
- Hungary (30)
- India
- Israel (2,500)
- Italy
- Kazakhstan
- Latvia
- Lithuania
- Luxembourg
- Macedonia (1)
- Mexico
- Moldova
- Netherlands
- New Zealand
- Panama
- Palau
- Paraguay
- Peru
- Poland
- Portugal
- Puerto Rico (1)
- Romania
- Russia
- Scotland (13)
- Serbia
- Singapore
- Slovakia
- Slovenia (1)
- South Africa
- Spain (65)
- Sweden
- Switzerland
- Turkey
- Ukraine
- United Kingdom (650)
- United States (1,500)
- Uruguay
- Uzbekistan
- Venezuela

== Medal count ==
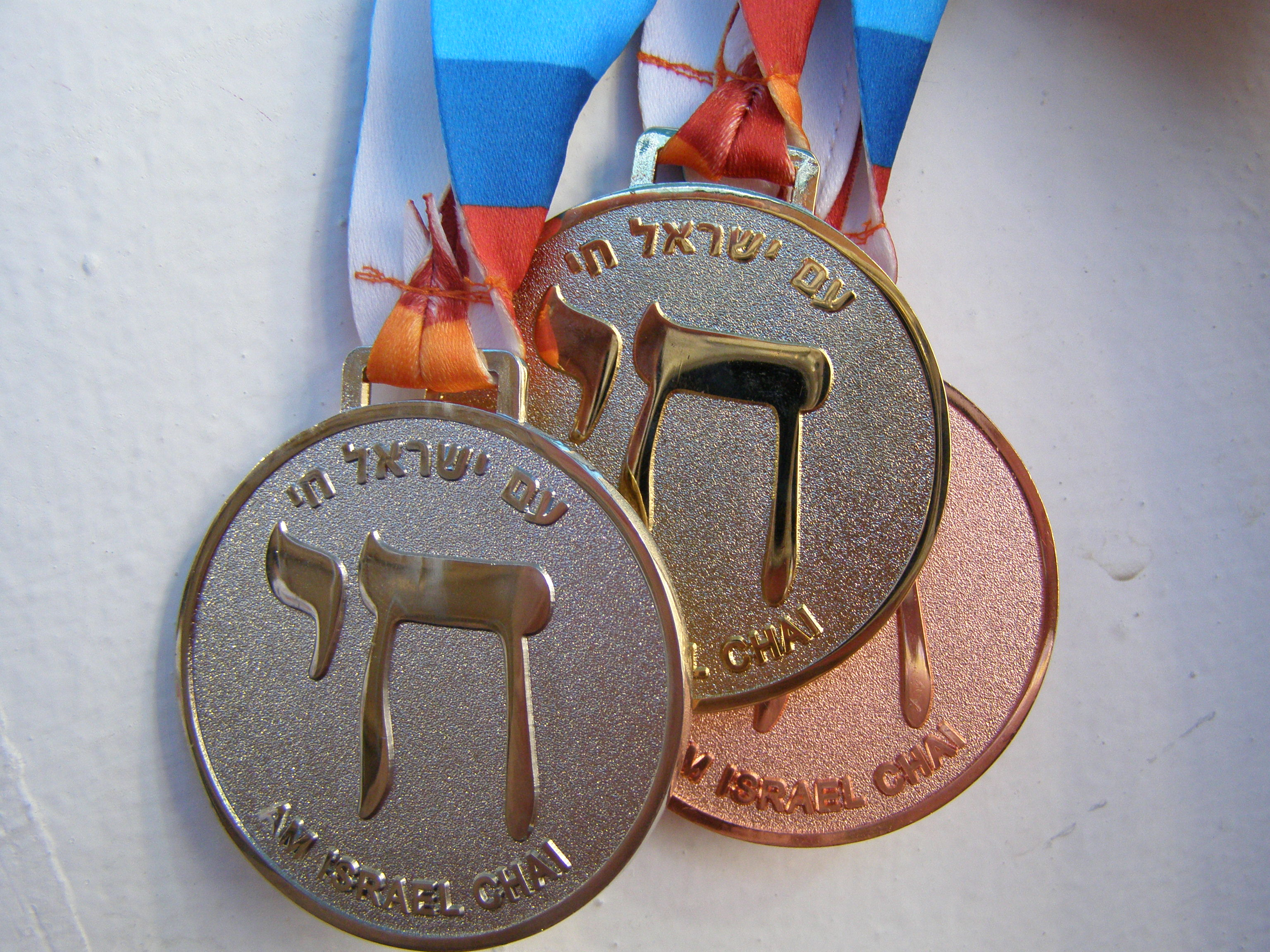
Medals in the 18th Maccabiah, front

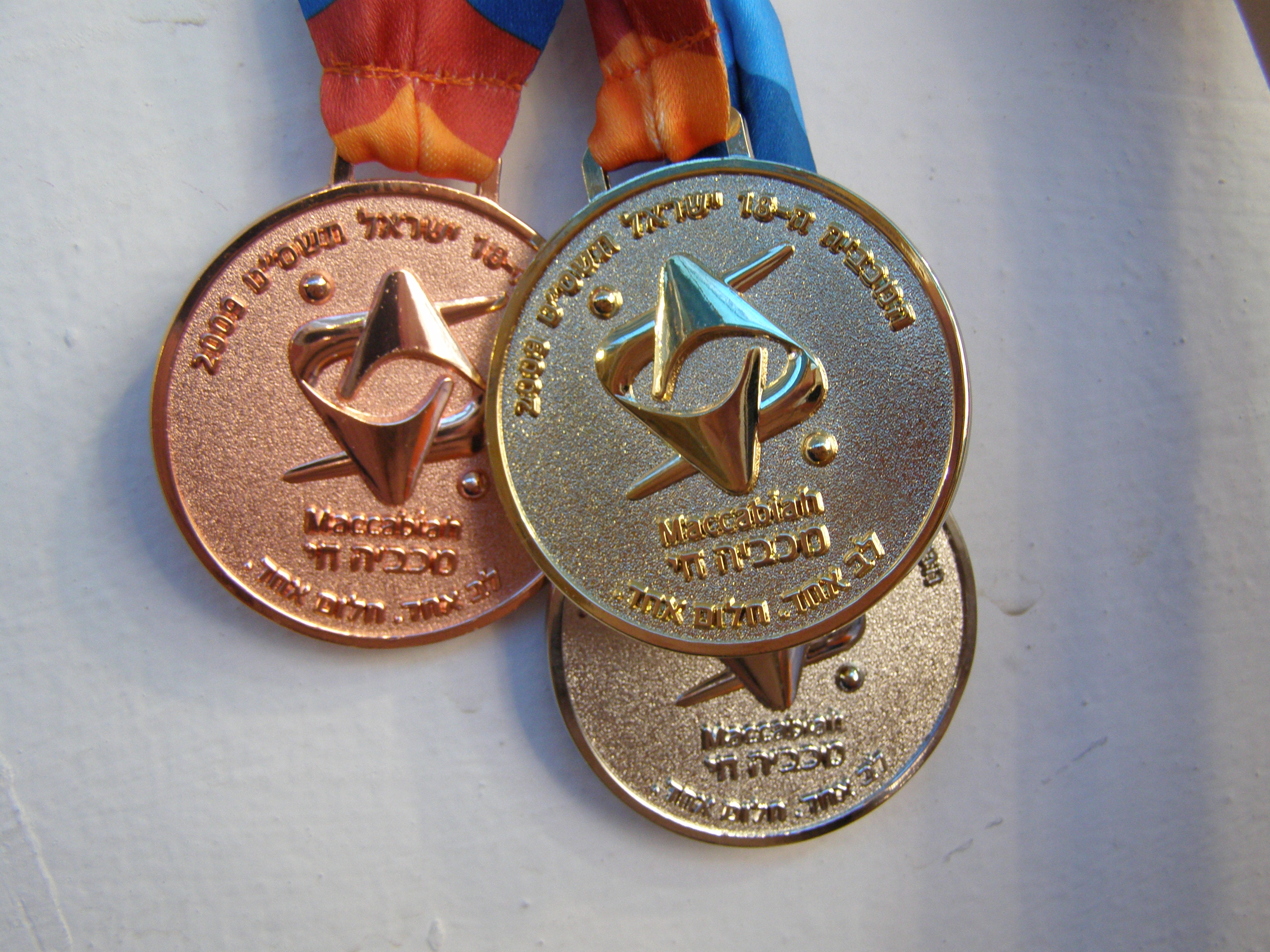
Medals in the 18th Maccabiah, back

* Host nation (Israel)

Rank	Nation	Gold	Silver	Bronze	Total
1	Israel*	118	118	87	323
2	United States	49	53	52	154
3	Russia	15	10	14	39
4	Canada	9	9	17	35
5	South Africa	6	0	4	10
6	France	5	2	1	8
7	Australia	4	3	8	15
8	Great Britain	2	7	5	14
9	Mexico	2	4	8	14
10	Brazil	2	2	2	6
11	Netherlands	2	0	2	4
12	Hungary	2	0	0	2
13	Argentina	1	2	2	5
14	Sweden	1	1	0	2
15	Georgia	1	0	2	3
15	Ukraine	1	0	2	3
17	Chile	1	0	0	1
17	Finland	1	0	0	1
17	Guatemala	1	0	0	1
20	Germany	0	2	4	6
21	Latvia	0	2	0	2
22	Costa Rica	0	1	0	1
22	India	0	1	0	1
24	Venezuela	0	0	1	1
Totals (24 entries)		223	217	211	651

== Sports ==
The following are the 31 sports which were contested at these Games.

- Athletics
- Badminton
- Baseball
- Basketball
- Bowling
- Chess
- Contract bridge
- Cricket
- Cycling
- Fencing
- Field hockey
- Football
- Futsal
- Golf
- Gymnastics
- Judo
- Karate
- Lawn bowls
- Netball
- Rowing
- Rugby union
- Softball
- Squash
- Swimming
- Table tennis
- Taekwondo
- Tennis
- Triathlon
- Volleyball
- Water polo
- Wrestling
