= Bensiyon Songavkar =

Indian professional cricketer (born 1985)

Personal information
- Full name: Bensiyon Morisbhai Songavkar
- Born: 16 August 1985 (age 41); Rajkot, India
- Batting: Left-handed
- Bowling: Right-arm off-break

Domestic team information
- Years: Team
- Saurashtra
- FC debut: 25 December 2005 Saurashtra v Goa
- Last FC: 2 February 2006 Saurashtra v Rajasthan
- LA debut: 12 February 2006 Saurashtra v Maharashtra
- Last LA: 14 February 2006 Saurashtra v Mumbai

Career statistics
Competition	First-class	List A
Matches	4	2
Runs scored	141	8
Batting average	35.25	4.00
100s/50s	0/2	0/0
Top score	80*	7
Balls bowled	48	–
Wickets	0	–
Bowling average	–	–
5 wickets in innings	–	–
10 wickets in match	–	–
Best bowling	–	–
Catches/stumpings	0/–	1/–
- Source: CricketArchive, 13 November 2011

Bensiyon Songavkar
Medal record

Representing India

Cricket

Maccabiah Games
Silver medal – second place	2009 Maccabiah	Cricket

Bensiyon Morisbhai Songavkar is an Indian professional cricketer who has represented Saurashtra. He lives in Rajkot, India, and is Jewish.

== Playing career ==
In 2008, Songavkar was included in a special Israel squad that played against India in a special match in honour of Israel's 60th anniversary. Songavkar was a suggested inclusion by then BCCI secretary general, Niranjan Shah, after the Israel Cricket Association requested names of Jewish cricketers in India.

A year later, Songavkar played for Team India which won a silver medal as he was selected player of the tournament for cricket at the 2009 Maccabiah Games in Israel. He was Captain of Team India in cricket at the 2017 Maccabiah Games.

== See also ==
- List of select Jewish cricketers
