= 1972–73 Israel State Cup =

Tournament details
- Country: Israel

Final positions
- Champions: Hapoel Jerusalem
- Runners-up: Hakoah Maccabi Ramat Gan

The 1972–73 Israel State Cup (Hebrew: גביע המדינה, Gvia HaMedina) was the 34th season of Israel's nationwide football cup competition and the 19th after the Israeli Declaration of Independence.

Starting with this edition, later rounds, which involved Liga Leumit clubs, were played as two-legged ties, up to the final, which remained a single match.

The competition was won by last year's finalist, Hapoel Jerusalem, who have beaten this season's league champions, Hakoah Maccabi Ramat Gan 2–0 at the final.

== Results ==
=== Fourth Round ===
| Home team | Score | Away team |
|---|---|---|
| Bnei Yehuda | 2–3 | Hapoel Merhavim |
| Hapoel Kfar Shalem | 2–2 (a.e.t.) 6–5 p. | Hapoel Beit Shemesh |
| Hapoel Yehud | 2–1 | Maccabi Yavne |
| Hapoel Bat Yam | 1–3 | Hapoel HaTzafon Tel Aviv |
| Hapoel Yeruham | 0–3 | Beitar Ramla |
| Hapoel Ramat Gan | 9–1 | Maccabi Zikhron Ya'akov |
| Hapoel Tiberias | 2–1 | Maccabi Tiberias |
| Hapoel Bnei Zion | 0–2 | Hapoel Ramla |
| Hapoel Afikim | 2–3 | Beitar Netanya |
| Maccabi Ramat Amidar | 9–1 | Hapoel Shikun HaMizrah |
| Hapoel Hadera | 2–0 | Beitar Tel Hanan |
| Hapoel Acre | 7–0 | Beitar Pardes Hanna |
| Beitar Dov Netanya | 0–0 (a.e.t.) 1–3 p. | Hapoel Herzliya |
| Hapoel Netanya | 1–2 | Hapoel Bnei Nazareth |
| Hapoel Kafr Qasim | 3–1 | Hapoel Dimona |
| Maccabi Rehovot | 0–3 | Hapoel Rishon LeZion |
| Hapoel Ashdod | 5–2 | Hapoel Gedera |
| Hapoel Kiryat Haim | 1–2 | Hapoel Mahane Yehuda |
| Hapoel Nahariya | 1–3 | Hapoel Beit She'an |
| Maccabi Herzliya | 2–0 | Hapoel Beit Eliezer |
| Hapoel Kiryat Malakhi | 2–5 | Hapoel Be'er Ya'akov |
| Maccabi Jerusalem | 0–2 | Hapoel Holon |
| Hapoel Nahliel | 1–2 | Maccabi Neve Sha'anan |
| Hapoel Yir'on | 1–2 | Hapoel Safed |
| Hapoel Bnei Acre | 1–7 | Hapoel Migdal HaEmek |
| Maccabi Sha'arayim | 3–2 (a.e.t.) | Hapoel Giv'atayim |
| Hapoel Tirat HaCarmel | 6–1 | Hapoel Majd al-Krum |
| Maccabi Kiryat Bialik | 2–3 (a.e.t.) | Hapoel Kiryat Shmona |
| Hapoel Givat Haim | 8–2 | Hapoel Kiryat Tiv'on |
| Hapoel Lod | 4–0 | ASA Jerusalem |
| Hapoel Eilat | 1–0 | Beitar Mahane Yehuda |
| Hapoel Kiryat Ono | 3–0 | Maccabi Bat Yam |

=== Fifth Round ===
| Home team | Score | Away team |
|---|---|---|
| Hapoel Ramla | 2–1 (a.e.t.) | Maccabi Sha'arayim |
| Hapoel Ramat Gan | 2–1 | Hapoel Bnei Nazareth |
| Hapoel Givat Haim | 4–1 | Hapoel Migdal HaEmek |
| Maccabi Neve Sha'anan | 0–3 | Hapoel Tirat HaCarmel |
| Hapoel HaTzafon Tel Aviv | 1–0 | Hapoel Kiryat Ono |
| Hapoel Acre | 1–0 | Maccabi Herzliya |
| Hapoel Ashdod | 1–2 (a.e.t.) | Maccabi Ramat Amidar |
| Hapoel Herzliya | 2–1 | Hapoel Safed |
| Hapoel Eilat | 1–2 | Beitar Ramla |
| Hapoel Be'er Ya'akov | 1–4 | Hapoel Rishon LeZion |
| Hapoel Hadera | 2–0 | Hapoel Mahane Yehuda |
| Hapoel Beit She'an | 2–1 | Beitar Netanya |
| Hapoel Kiryat Shmona | 3–2 (a.e.t.) | Hapoel Tiberias |
| Hapoel Holon | 6–2 | Hapoel Kafr Qasim |
| Hapoel Merhavim | 2–0 | Hapoel Kfar Shalem |
| Hapoel Lod | 1–2 | Hapoel Yehud |

=== Sixth Round ===
| Team 1 | Agg. | Team 2 | 1st leg | 2nd leg |
|---|---|---|---|---|
| Maccabi Jaffa | 3–1 | Hapoel Ramla | 1–1 | 2–0 |
| Hapoel Tel Aviv | 0–0; 3–1 p. | Beitar Ramla | 0–0 | 0–0 |
| Hapoel Holon | 3–2 | Hapoel Be'er Sheva | 3–1 | 0–1 |
| Hapoel Merhavim | 1–7 | Hapoel Marmorek | 0–1 | 1–6 |
| Maccabi Ramat Amidar | 2–3 | Hapoel Jerusalem | 2–0 | 0–3 |
| Hapoel Kiryat Shmona | 2–7 | Shimshon Tel Aviv | 2–5 | 0–2 |
| Maccabi Tel Aviv | 3–0 | Hapoel Ramat Gan | 2–0 | 1–0 |
| Hapoel Beit She'an | 2–10 | Maccabi Petah Tikva | 2–4 | 0–6 |
| Hapoel Rishon LeZion | 0–8 | Maccabi Netanya | 0–2 | 0–6 |
| Beitar Tel Aviv | 1–1; 2–3 p. | Hapoel Hadera | 1–1 | 0–0 |
| Hapoel Petah Tikva | 4–0 | Hapoel Herzliya | 3–0 | 1–0 |
| Beitar Jerusalem | 8–1 | Hapoel Yehud | 7–0 | 1–1 |
| Hapoel Tirat HaCarmel | 4–6 | Hapoel Kfar Saba | 2–4 | 2–2 |
| Hapoel HaTzafon Tel Aviv | 0–11 | Hapoel Haifa | 0–7 | 0–4 |
| Maccabi Haifa | 2–1 | Hapoel Acre | 0–0 | 2–1 |
| Hakoah Maccabi Ramat Gan | 8–2 | Hapoel Givat Haim | 4–1 | 4–1 |

=== Round of 16 ===
| Team 1 | Agg. | Team 2 | 1st leg | 2nd leg |
|---|---|---|---|---|
| Hapoel Marmorek | 3–5 | Shimshon Tel Aviv | 2–2 | 1–3 |
| Maccabi Tel Aviv | 1–0 | Maccabi Netanya | 0–0 | 1–0 (a.e.t.) |
| Hapoel Petah Tikva | 3–1 | Maccabi Jaffa | 1–0 | 2–1 |
| Maccabi Haifa | 2–1 | Hapoel Hadera | 1–1 | 1–0 |
| Hapoel Kfar Saba | 4–5 | Hapoel Tel Aviv | 1–2 | 3–3 |
| Hapoel Holon | 3–3; 3–4 p. | Hakoah Maccabi Ramat Gan | 2–1 | 1–2 |
| Maccabi Petah Tikva | 5–4 | Beitar Jerusalem | 2–2 | 3–2 |
| Hapoel Haifa | 1–5 | Hapoel Jerusalem | 0–2 | 1–3 |

=== Quarter-finals ===
| Team 1 | Agg. | Team 2 | 1st leg | 2nd leg |
|---|---|---|---|---|
| Maccabi Haifa | 1–1; 3–4 p. | Hakoah Maccabi Ramat Gan | 1–0 | 0–1 |
| Maccabi Tel Aviv | 1–2 | Maccabi Petah Tikva | 0–0 | 1–2 |
| Hapoel Petah Tikva | 1–4 | Hapoel Tel Aviv | 1–2 | 0–2 |
| Shimshon Tel Aviv | 0–10 | Hapoel Jerusalem | 0–8 | 0–2 (f) (Note: Shimshon Tel Aviv chose to forfeit the match due to their defeat in the first match.) |

=== Semi-finals ===
| Team 1 | Agg. | Team 2 | 1st leg | 2nd leg |
|---|---|---|---|---|
| Hakoah Maccabi Ramat Gan | 3–2 | Maccabi Petah Tikva | 1–0 | 2–2 |
| Hapoel Jerusalem | 2–1 | Hapoel Tel Aviv | 2–0 | 0–1 |

=== Final ===
20 June 1973

| Hakoah Maccabi Ramat Gan | 0–2 | Hapoel Jerusalem |
|---|---|---|
| | | Turjeman 68'; Ta-Shma 80' |

Bloomfield Stadium, Tel Aviv
Attendance: 18000
Referee: Ashkenazi
