= Yud-Alef Stadium =

Football stadium in Ashdod, Israel

Coordinates: 31°48′37″N 34°38′54″E

HaYud-Alef Stadium איצטדיון הי"א
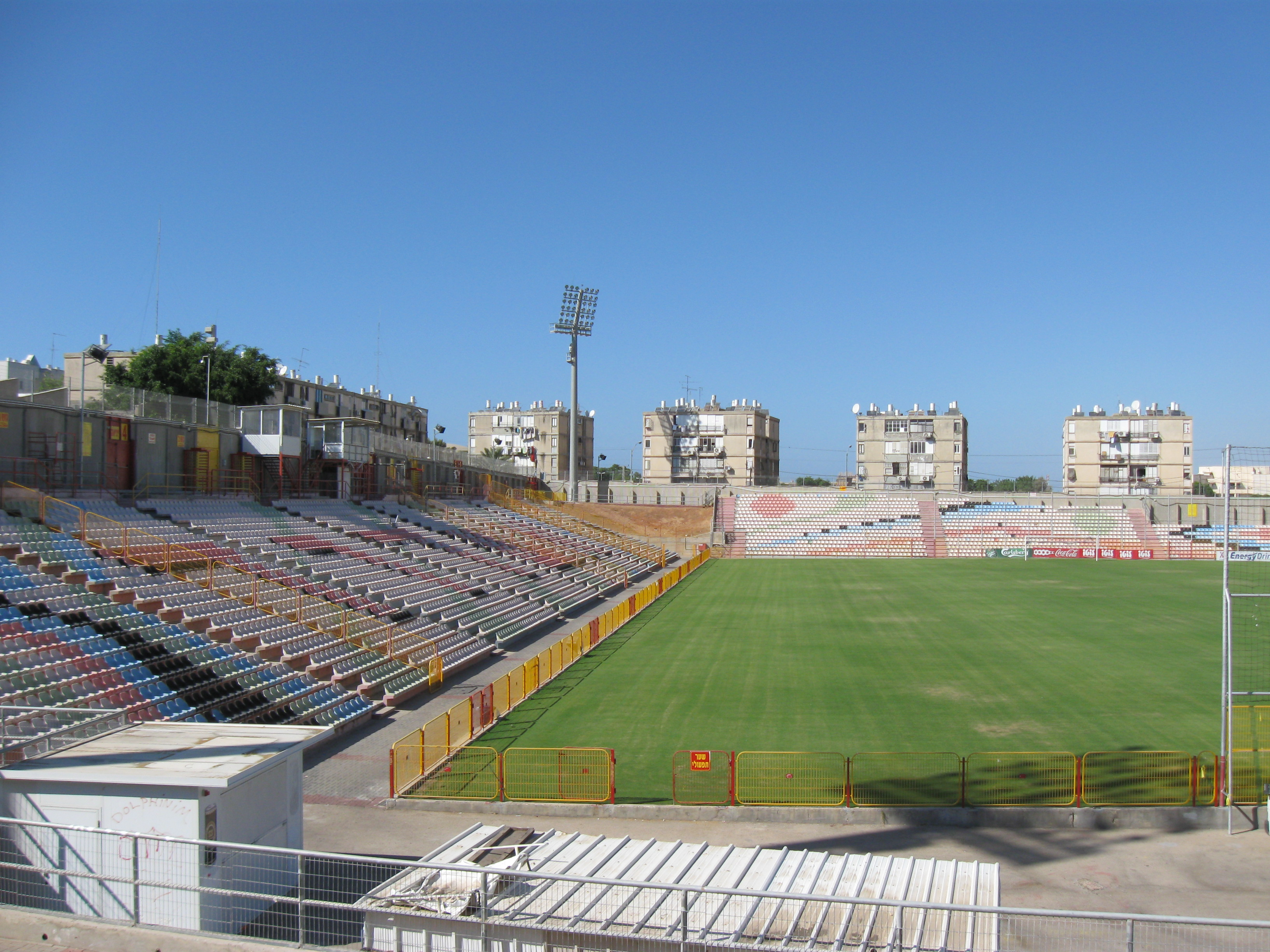
- Interactive map of HaYud-Alef Stadium איצטדיון הי"א
- Location: 6 HaHistadrut Street, Neighborhood A, Ashdod, Israel 77401
- Owner: Municipality of Ashdod
- Operator: Municipality of Ashdod
- Capacity: 6,733
- Surface: Grass

Construction
- Groundbreaking: 1966
- Opened: 1966

Tenants
- Maccabi Ashdod (1966–1981); Beitar Ashdod (1966–1981); Hapoel Ashdod (1966–1999); Ironi Ashdod (1981–1999); F.C. Ashdod (1999–present)

The Yud-Alef Stadium (Hebrew: אצטדיון הי"א, Etztadion HaYudAlef, lit. The 11 Stadium) is a football stadium in Ashdod, Israel, that was built for local football sides Maccabi Ashdod, Beitar Ashdod (both merged in 1981 to form Maccabi Ironi Ashdod) and Hapoel Ashdod (merged with Ironi Ashdod in 1999 to create F.C. Ashdod).

The stadium was given the name "Yud-Alef" in 1973, after the eleven Israeli athletes murdered in the Munich massacre (Yud-Alef is used in Hebrew numerals used to represent the number 11). The naming ceremony took place on 17 July 1973, when the stadium hosted the final of the 1973 Maccabiah Games.

There are four stands in the stadium which is not aesthetically pleasing. The stadium is also thought to be one of the few in the world where the home fans have fewer seats than the visitors. There are a total of 4,000 seats in gates three and four (set aside for visiting supporters). Gates one and two together hold only 3,420 giving the local side a disadvantage when a bigger club comes to town.

In a recent article in Yedioth Ahronoth, it was found that the stadium was not built properly and is not safe. The only parts that were deemed safe were the locker rooms and showers. In January 2015 the stadium management unveiled a new a revamped VIP stand.

On 29 August 2006 the fences surrounding the pitch were removed to make for better sightlines for visitors to the stadium.
