= Osher Zeitun =

Israeli footballer (born 1991)

Osher Zeitun אושר זיתון
Personal information
- Full name: Osher Zeitun אושר זיתון
- Date of birth: 14 January 1991 (age 35)
- Place of birth: Nesher, Israel
- Position: Center-back

Team information
- Current team: Hapoel Umm al-Fahm
- Number: 12

Youth career
- 2006–2008: Maccabi Haifa
- 2008: Hapoel Be'er Sheva
- 2009–2010: Beitar Nes Tubruk

Senior career*
Years	Team	Apps	(Gls)
2008	Hapoel Be'er Sheva	1	(0)
2009–2010	Beitar Nes Tubruk	1	(0)
2010–2011	Hapoel Daliyat al-Karmel	10	(0)
2011–2012	Ironi Tiberias	25	(1)
2012	Hapoel Daliyat al-Karmel	5	(0)
2013	Bnei Eilat	14	(0)
2013–2014	Hapoel Daliyat al-Karmel	14	(1)
2014	Hapoel Iksal	6	(0)
Total		76	(2)

International career
2007–2008	Israel U17	9	(0)
2008–2009	Israel U18	3	(0)
2009	Israel U19	3	(0)
- * Club domestic league appearances and goals as of 21 November 2014 (UTC)

Osher Zeitun
Medal record

Representing Israel

Football

Maccabiah Games
Bronze medal – third place	2009 Maccabiah	Football

Osher Zeitun (Hebrew: אושר זיתון; born 14 January 1991) is an Israeli association football player currently contracted to Hapoel Iksal.

== Biography ==
=== Playing career ===
Zeitun made his professional debut for Hapoel Be'er Sheva, coming on as a substitute for Eliran Efriat, in a 0–0 Liga Leumit draw against Ironi Nir Ramat HaSharon on 29 August 2008.

==== International career ====
Zeitun represented Israel at the 2009 Maccabiah Games, winning a bronze medal.
