= Football at the 1965 Maccabiah Games =

Tournament details
- Host country: Israel
- Dates: 24 – 30 August
- Teams: 9
- Venue(s): 5 (in 5 host cities)

Final positions
- Champions: Israel
- Runners-up: Great Britain
- Third place: Mexico
- Fourth place: Argentina

Tournament statistics
- Matches played: 15
- Goals scored: 63 (4.2 per match)

Football at the 1965 Maccabiah Games was held in several stadiums in Israel starting on 30 August.

The competition was open for men's teams only. Teams from 9 countries participated. The competition was won by Israel.

As part of the closing ceremony, an exhibition match was played between Israel and Torino F.C., which resulted with a 2–1 victory to Israel.

== Format ==
The nine teams were divided into three groups, each team playing the others once. The top team from each group qualified to the medals group, while the second-placed team qualified to the 4th-6th place group. The bottom team in each group was eliminated.

== Results ==
=== First round ===
==== Group A ====
Team	Pld	W	D	L	GF	GA	Pts
Great Britain	2	1	1	0	5	2	3
Peru	2	1	0	1	5	6	2
France	2	0	1	1	3	5	1

24 August 1965
France	1–1	Great Britain	Hapoel Ground, Petah Tikva
25 August 1965
Great Britain	4–1	Peru	Hadera Ground, Hadera
26 August 1965
Peru	4–2	France	Maccabi Ground, Hadera

==== Group B ====
Team	Pld	W	D	L	GF	GA	Pts
Israel	2	2	0	0	11	2	4
Denmark	2	1	0	1	3	4	2
United States	2	0	0	2	4	12	0

24 August 1965
Israel	9–2	United States	Maccabi Jaffa Ground, Tel Aviv
25 August 1965
Israel	2–0	Denmark	Sala Stadium, Ashkelon
26 August 1965
Denmark	3–2	United States	Municipal Stadium, Bat Yam

==== Group C ====
Team	Pld	W	D	L	GF	GA	Pts
Mexico	2	1	1	0	5	2	3
Argentina	2	1	1	0	2	1	3
Sweden	2	0	0	2	1	5	0

24 August 1965
Argentina	1–0	Sweden	Sala Stadium, Ashkelon
25 August 1965
Mexico	1–1	Argentina	Hapoel Ground, Petah Tikva
26 August 1965
Mexico	4–1	Sweden	Maccabi Jaffa Ground, Tel Aviv

=== Final round ===
==== 4th-6th places group ====
Team	Pld	W	D	L	GF	GA	Pts
Argentina	2	2	0	0	6	2	4
Peru	2	1	0	1	5	5	2
Denmark	2	0	0	2	2	6	0

27 August 1965
Argentina	3–2	Peru	Maccabi Jaffa Ground, Tel Aviv
29 August 1965
Peru	3–2	Denmark	Hapoel Ground, Petah Tikva
30 August 1965
Argentina	3–0	Denmark	Maccabi Jaffa Ground, Tel Aviv

==== Medals group ====
Team	Pld	W	D	L	GF	GA	Pts
Israel	2	2	0	0	10	0	4
Great Britain	2	1	0	1	3	5	2
Mexico	2	0	0	2	0	8	0

27 August 1965
Israel	5–0	Mexico	Maccabi Jaffa Ground, Tel Aviv
29 August 1965
Great Britain	w/o^{1}	Mexico	Hapoel Ground, Petah Tikva
30 August 1965
Israel	5–0	Great Britain	Maccabi Jaffa Ground, Tel Aviv

1. The match between the UK and Mexico was abandoned at the 71st minute, after Mexico conceded a penalty, and their goalkeeper was sent off as he protested the decision. The result at the time of abandonment was 1–1. The Games Committee set the result to 3–0 to the UK.

== Final ranking ==
R	Team	P	W	D	L	GF	GA	GD	Pts.
Medals group
1	Israel	4	4	0	0	21	2	+19	8
2	Great Britain	4	2	1	1	8	7	+1	5
3	Mexico	4	1	1	2	5	10	-5	3
4th–6th place group
4	Argentina	4	3	1	0	8	3	+5	7
5	Peru	4	2	0	2	10	11	-1	4
6	Denmark	4	1	0	3	5	10	-5	2
Eliminated at group stage
7	France	2	0	1	1	3	5	-2	1
8	Sweden	2	0	0	2	1	5	-4	0
9	United States	2	0	0	2	4	12	-8	0
