= Gil Vainshtein =

Canadian association football player (born 1984)

Personal information
- Full name: 29 October 1984 (age 42)
- Place of birth: Ukraine
- Position: Midfielder

Team information
- Current team: Italia Shooters
- Number: 6

Youth career
- 2003–2007: Alderson-Broaddus College

Senior career*
Years	Team	Apps	(Gls)
2007	North York Astros	29	(8)
2008	Italia Shooters	28	(4)
- * Club domestic league appearances and goals as of 03:38, 11 May 2009 (UTC)

Gil Vainshtein
Medal record

Representing Canada

Football

Maccabiah Games
Bronze medal – third place	2009 Maccabiah	Football
Bronze medal – third place	2013 Maccabiah	Football

Gil Vainshtein (born 29 October 1984 in Ukraine) is a Canadian association football player who plays as a midfielder for the Italia Shooters of the Canadian Soccer League. In university he played for Alderson-Broaddus College, with whom he was named to the 2005 NSCAA/Adidas NCAA Division II All-Appalachian Region second team, and named 2005 First Team All-West Virginia Intercollegiate Athletic Conference (WVIAC). Professionally, he has played for the North York Astros and the Italia Shooters. Vainshtein played for and was team captain of the Canadian football squad that competed at the 2009 Maccabiah Games in Israel, and won a bronze medal, and also played for Team Canada in the 2013 Maccabiah Games, winning a second bronze medal.

== Biography ==
=== Playing career ===
Vainshtein is a midfielder in association football. He attended Alderson-Broaddus College in West Virginia, playing for its soccer team the Battlers, and graduating in 2007. In his junior year, Vainshtein was named by the National Soccer Coaches Association of America to the 2005 NSCAA/Adidas NCAA Division II All-Appalachian Region second team. He was also named 2005 First Team All-West Virginia Intercollegiate Athletic Conference (WVIAC).

In 2007, he played for the North York Astros in Canada. In 2008 Vainshtein played for the Italia Shooters in Canada.

In 2009, Vainshtein played for and was team captain of the Canadian football squad that competed at the 2009 Maccabiah Games in Israel, and won a bronze medal. He also played for Team Canada in the 2013 Maccabiah Games, winning a second bronze medal.

== Statistics ==
Club performance			League		Cup		League Cup		Continental		Total	
Season	Club	League	Apps	Goals	Apps	Goals	Apps	Goals	Apps	Goals	Apps	Goals
Canada			League		Voyageurs Cup		League Cup		North America		Total	
2007	North York Astros	CSL	-	-	-	-	-	-	-	-	-	-
2008	Italia Shooters	CSL	28	0	-	-	-	-	-	-	-	-
2009	Italia Shooters	CSL	-	-	-	-	-	-	-	-	-	-
Career total			-	-	-	-	-	-	-	-	-	-
