= Adir Maman =

Israeli footballer

Adir Maman אדיר ממן
Personal information
- Full name: Adir Maman אדיר ממן
- Date of birth: 11 April 1991 (age 35)
- Place of birth: Rehovot, Israel
- Position: Midfielder

Youth career
- Hapoel Tel Aviv

Senior career*
Years	Team	Apps	(Gls)
2010–2011	Maccabi Ironi Bat Yam	21	(0)
2011–2012	Sektzia Ness Ziona	10	(0)
2012–2013	Maccabi Kiryat Malakhi	23	(0)
2014	Zaria Bălți		
2018–2019	Maccabi Kiryat Ekron	9	(0)

International career
2007–2008	Israel U17	6	(0)
2008–2009	Israel U18	5	(0)
2009	Israel U19	8	(0)
- * Club domestic league appearances and goals

Adir Maman
Medal record

Representing Israel

Football

Maccabiah Games
Bronze medal – third place	2009 Maccabiah	Football

Adir Maman (Hebrew: אדיר ממן; born 11 April 1991) is an Israeli professional association football player who played in the Liga Leumit.

== Biography ==
=== Playing career ===
Maman made his professional debut, coming on as a substitute for Douglas da Silva, in a 0–1 Toto Cup loss to Beitar Jerusalem on 23 September 2009.

==== International career ====
Maman represented Israel at the 2009 Maccabiah Games, winning a bronze medal.
