= Muayan Halaili =

Israeli footballer

Muayan Halaili מועין ח'ילאילי
Personal information
- Full name: Muayan Halaili מועין ח'ילאילי
- Date of birth: 3 August 1991 (age 35)
- Place of birth: Israel
- Position: Defender

Team information
- Current team: Hapoel Haifa

Youth career
- Hapoel Haifa

Senior career*
Years	Team	Apps	(Gls)
2008–2013	Hapoel Haifa	6	(0)
2015–2017	Ihud Bnei Majd al-Krun	10	(0)
2018	Hapoel Ihud Bnei Sumei	6	(0)
2018	Ahi Acre	11	(1)
Total		33	(1)

International career
2009	Israel U18	2	(0)
2009	Israel U19	5	(0)
- * Club domestic league appearances and goals as of 1 January 2016

Muayan Halaili
Medal record

Representing Israel

Football

Maccabiah Games
Bronze medal – third place	2009 Maccabiah	Football

Muayan Halaili (Hebrew: מועין ח'ילאילי, sometimes written as Hebrew: מועיין חליאלה; born 3 August 1991) is an Israeli professional association football player.

== Biography ==
=== Playing career ===
Halaili made his professional debut, coming on as a substitute for Oded Elkayam, in a 0–1 Toto Cup victory against Ahi Nazareth on 12 November 2008. Halaili rose to the first team at Hapoel Haifa during the 2011/12 season where he made his first appearance in a Liga Al match starting against Hapoel Ironi Kiryat Shmona on 20 August 2011.

==== International career ====
Halaili represented Israel at the 2009 Maccabiah Games, winning a bronze medal.

== Statistics ==
Statistics accurate as of 13 February 2012

Club performance			League		Cup		League Cup		Continental		Total	
Season	Club	League	Apps	Goals	Apps	Goals	Apps	Goals	Apps	Goals	Apps	Goals
Israel			League		Israel State Cup		Toto Cup		Europe		Total	
2008–2009	Hapoel Haifa	Liga Leumit	0	0	0	0	1	0	0	0	1	0
2009–2010	Hapoel Haifa	Liga Al	0	0	0	0	0	0	0	0	0	0
2010–2011	Hapoel Haifa	Liga Al	0	0	0	0	0	0	0	0	0	0
2011–2012	Hapoel Haifa	Liga Al	6	0	0	0	1	0	0	0	7	0
Career total			6	0	0	0	2	0	0	0	8	0
