= Football at the 1961 Maccabiah Games =

Tournament details
- Host country: Israel
- Dates: 30 August – 6 September
- Teams: 6
- Venue(s): 6 (in 6 host cities)

Final positions
- Champions: Great Britain
- Runners-up: Israel
- Third place: South Africa
- Fourth place: Switzerland

Tournament statistics
- Matches played: 11
- Goals scored: 49 (4.45 per match)

Football at the 1961 Maccabiah Games was held in several stadiums in Israel starting on 30 August.

The competition was open for men's teams only. Teams from 6 countries participated. For the first time since the establishment of Israel, the hosts didn't win the tournament, as Israel lost in the medals group to the team from United Kingdom, who went on to win the title.

As part of the closing ceremony, an exhibition match was played between Israel and Juventus FC, which resulted with a 3–3 draw.

== Format ==
The six teams were divided into two groups, each team playing the others once. The top two qualified for the medals group, while the bottom two played for the 6th-7th places.

== Results ==
=== First round ===
==== Group A ====
Team	Pld	W	D	L	GF	GA	Pts
Israel	2	1	1	0	3	2	3
South Africa	2	1	0	1	5	2	2
Brazil	2	0	1	1	1	5	1

30 August 1961
South Africa	4–0^{1}	Brazil	Maccabi Ground, Netanya
31 August 1961
Israel	1–1	Brazil	Hapoel Ground, Jerusalem
1 September 1961
Israel	2–1	South Africa	Maccabi Ground, Hadera

1. The match between South Africa and Brazil was abandoned at the 80th minute, due to a brawl between the players.

==== Group B ====
Team	Pld	W	D	L	GF	GA	Pts
Great Britain	1	1	0	0	4	1	2
Switzerland	1	1	0	0	1	0	2
Argentina	2	0	0	2	1	5	0

30 August 1961
Great Britain	4–1	Argentina	Maccabi Ground, Netanya
31 August 1961
Switzerland	1–0	Argentina	Maccabi Ground, Petah Tikva
1 September 1961
Switzerland	^{1}	Great Britain	Maccabi Ground, Rehovot

1. The match between United Kingdom and Switzerland was postponed as the pitch at Rehovot wasn't fit for matches. As both teams already qualified for the semi-finals, the re-arranged match was played as a semi-final match.

== Final round ==
=== 5th-6th places group ===
Team	Pld	W	D	L	GF	GA	Pts
Brazil	1	1	0	0	2	0	2
Argentina	1	0	0	1	0	2	0

4 September 1961
Brazil	2–0	Argentina	Maccabiah Stadium, Tel Aviv

=== Medals group ===
Team	Pld	W	D	L	GF	GA	Pts
Great Britain	3	3	0	0	10	2	6
Israel	3	2	0	1	8	3	4
South Africa	3	1	0	2	8	10	2
Switzerland	3	0	0	3	4	16	0

3 September 1961
Israel	6–1	South Africa	Kiryat Eliezer Stadium, Haifa
Great Britain	9–2	Switzerland	Kiryat Eliezer Stadium, Haifa
4 September 1961
Israel	1–2	Great Britain	Maccabiah Stadium, Tel Aviv
South Africa	7–2	Switzerland	Maccabiah Stadium, Tel Aviv
6 September 1961
Great Britain	2–0	South Africa
Israel	w/o	Switzerland
