= Kiryat Eliezer Stadium =

Football stadium in Haifa, Israel

Coordinates: 32°49′38″N 34°58′53″E

Haifa Municipal Stadium אצטדיון העירוני חיפה
- Kiryat Eliezer קריית אליעזר
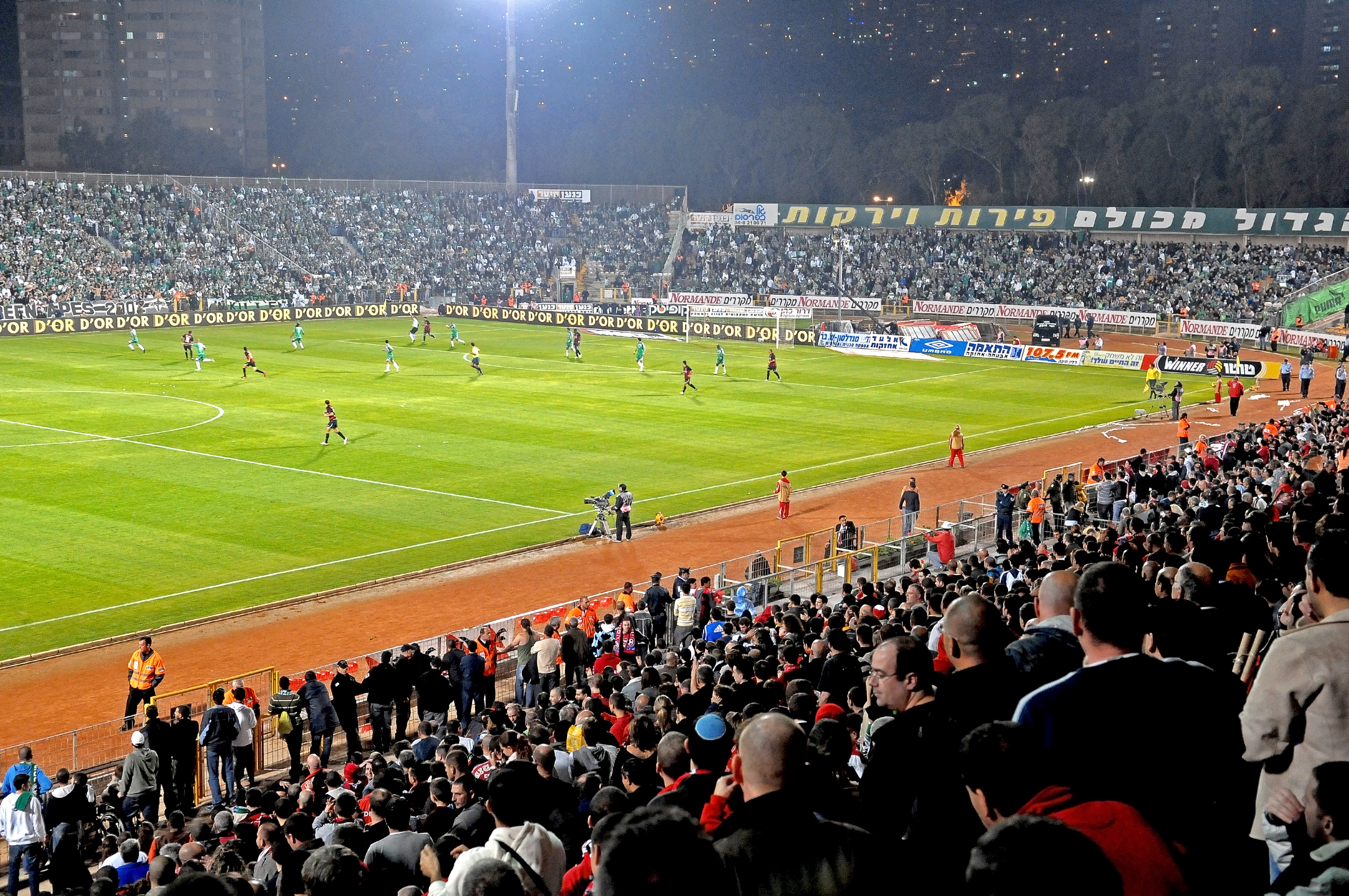
- Interactive map of Haifa Municipal Stadium אצטדיון העירוני חיפה
- Location: 16 Tzahal Street, Kiryat Eliezer, Haifa 35157
- Owner: Municipality of Haifa
- Operator: ETHOS
- Capacity: 14,002
- Surface: Grass
- Public transit: Coastal Railway Line at Haifa–Bat Galim

Construction
- Groundbreaking: 1955
- Opened: 1955
- Closed: 2014
- Demolished: 2015
- Years active: 1955-2014

Tenants
- Hapoel Haifa (1955–2014); Maccabi Haifa (1955–2014): Major sporting events hosted; 1964 AFC Asian Cup

The Haifa Municipal Stadium (Hebrew: האצטדיון העירוני חיפה, Etztadion HaIroni Haifa), more commonly known as Kiryat Eliezer (קריית אליעזר), was a multi-use stadium in the Kiryat Eliezer neighborhood of Haifa, Israel. It was mostly used for football matches and as the home stadium of Maccabi Haifa and Hapoel Haifa. At 2014, It was replaced by the new Sammy Ofer Stadium, located at the southern entrance to the city.

== Background ==
The stadium, officially called Haifa Municipal Stadium or Luigi Antonini Stadium, was built in 1955, as a gift from the International Ladies Garment Workers Union. It seats 14,002 among its 14 gates. Ownership of the stadium belonged to the Municipality of Haifa, though it was managed by a suborganization called ETHOS. The stadium was officially opened on 14 September 1955, with a match between Haifa XI and Tel Aviv XI. On 24 September 1955 the first Haifa derby was played at the stadium, with Maccabi beating Hapoel 4-1. Both clubs had previously played at Kiryat Haim Stadium in the Kerayot area of Haifa. The first match played at the stadium, while it was being built, was held during the 1953 Maccabiah Games, between Israel and Finland. On October 4, 1956, the stadium was dedicated by Haifa's Mayor Abba Khushi at ceremonies attended by Mr. Antonini, vice-president of the International Ladies' Garment Workers' Union, and a delegation of Italian-American trade union leaders.

The stadium did not meet UEFA's highest standards forcing the clubs in Haifa to host their European matches in the Tel Aviv area. At certain times, UEFA also has limited clubs from outside the Tel Aviv area from hosting even low level European qualifiers citing security concerns.

Kiryat Eliezer was the only stadium in Israel equipped with electronic gates in an effort to curb scalping and the sale of counterfeit tickets. Regulars to the stadium could have purchased a card for 10 shekels, which can be refilled for specific matches held at the stadium.

There was one scoreboard in the stadium, which did not have a replay screen. The only television in the stadium, outside of the television broadcast booth, was in front of the seat of Ya'akov Shahar, the owner of Maccabi Haifa. Only the A section of the stadium was covered by a roof.

The last game in the stadium was played on 14 May 2014, with Maccabi Haifa hosting Maccabi Tel Aviv in the Israeli Premier League.

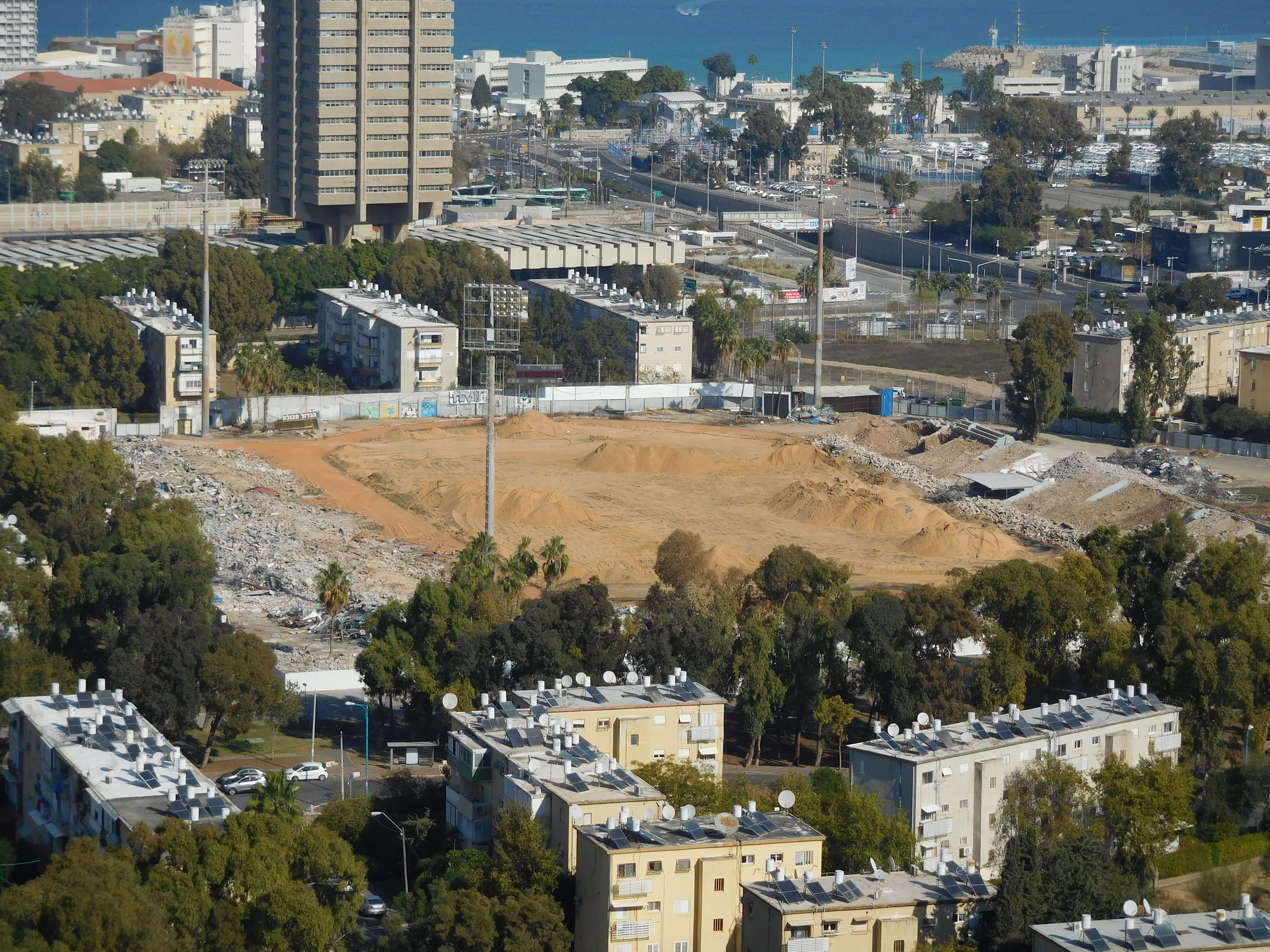
The demolition work at Kiryat Eliezer Stadium, as seen from Stella Maris Road.

On May 14, 2014, Maccabi Haifa held a farewell ceremony for the Kiryat Eliezer Stadium. The Mayor of Haifa, Yona Yahav, and Ya'akov Shachar, the club's owner, gave speeches. Former players from 1984 also attended to pay their final respects to the stadium, alongside Moshe Ran, the father of the club's legendary goalkeeper, Avi Ran.

The stadium closed in 2014, and Maccabi Haifa moved to play at the new Sammy Ofer Stadium, located a little further south of Kiryat Eliezer. About two weeks before the demolition of the stadium, a report was published stating that Maccabi Haifa had left behind many souvenirs and items of historical value for football fans at the stadium. The club claimed that the offices were broken into, damage was caused to the equipment and items that were supposed to be removed before the demolition work began. The Israel Police opened an investigation into the incident, during which two suspects were arrested for the break-in.

== Transportation ==
The stadium was located in the Kiryat Eliezer neighborhood of Haifa. Adjacent to the stadium is Beit Egged. Thus the stadium was easily served by all Egged bus lines running into and out of Haifa as well as the Bat Galim Railway Station, which is a central stop for all train lines running up the coast of the Mediterranean Sea.

== Gates ==
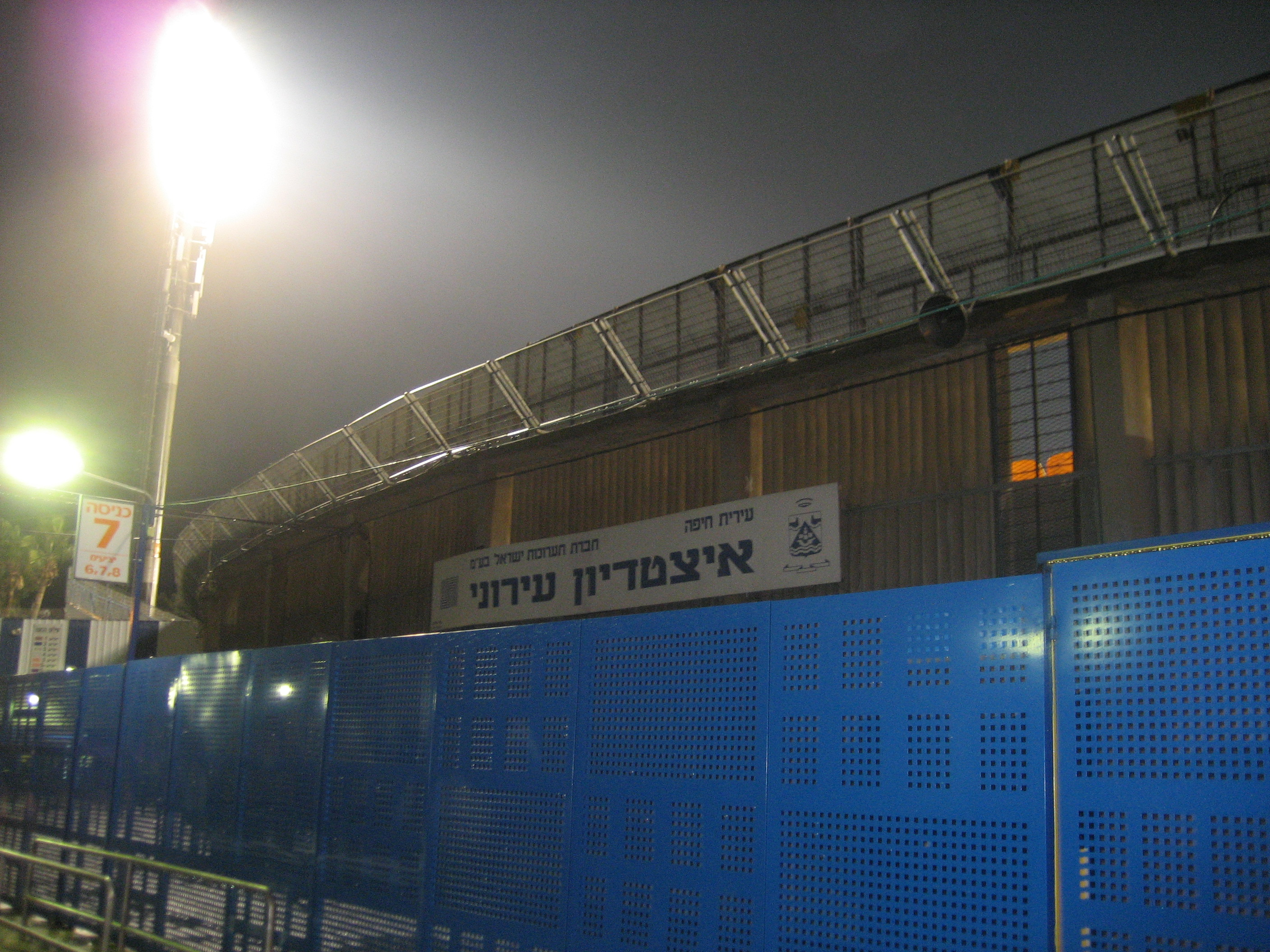
Outside the stadium

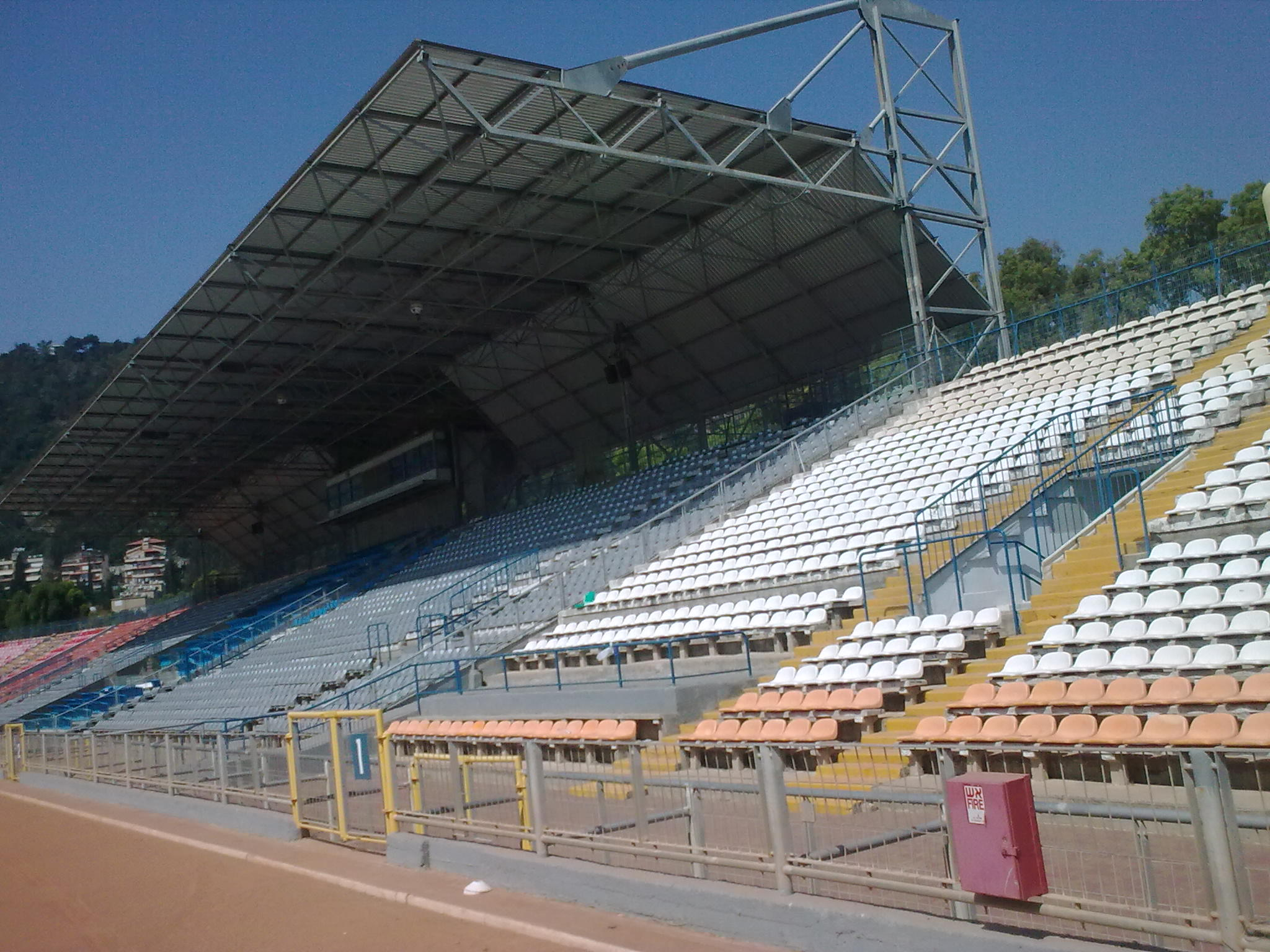
VIP Section at Kiryat Eliezer

Area	Gate	Capacity
A	1	1003
A	2	1283
A	VIP Section	548
A	Press Box	52
A	4	1528
A	5A	721
A	5B	831
B	6	466
B	7	807
B	8	475
C	9	834
C	10	850
C	11	944
C	12	958
C	13	1082
C	14	954
Total	14	14002
