= Karnei Oren Memorial Field =

Stadium in Ra'anana, Israel

Coordinates: 32°11′11.53″N 34°52′21.01″E

- Interactive map of Karnei Oren Memorial Field
- Full name: Karnei Oren Memorial Field
- Former names: Histadrut Field
- Location: Ra'anana, Israel
- Owner: Ra'anana Municipality
- Capacity: 2,500

Construction
- Opened: 1940
- Renovated: 2000; 2010

Tenants
- Hapoel Ra'anana; Bnei Ra'anana; Hapoel Ra'anana (women)

Karnei Oren Memorial Field, also known as Histadrut Field (as it is located at the corner of Keren Hayesod and Histadrut streets) or Ra'anana Stadium, is a multi-use stadium in Ra'anana, Israel.

It is used mostly for football matches. The stadium was used previously by Hapoel Ra'anana, while playing in Liga Leumit, most recently in 2012–13, and it is currently used by Bnei Ra'anana, who play in Liga Bet. The stadium was opened in 1940 and has a capacity of 2,500 spectators.
