= Football at the 1935 Maccabiah Games =

Tournament details
- Host country: Mandatory Palestine
- Dates: 2–10 April
- Teams: 6

Final positions
- Champions: Romania
- Runners-up: Germany
- Third place: Eretz Yisrael
- Fourth place: Poland

Football at the 1935 Maccabiah Games was the football tournament held as part of the 1935 Maccabiah Games. It was held in several stadiums in Mandatory Palestine and began on 2 April 1935.

The competition was open for men's teams only. Teams from 6 countries participated, with each team meeting its opponents once. Although not all scores are known, it is known that Romania won the gold medal, Germany won the silver medal and Eretz Yisrael won bronze, followed by Poland, United Kingdom and Lithuania.

== Known results ==
- Eretz Yisrael 2–0 Poland (Maccabiah Stadium, Tel Aviv)
- Germany 2–1 United Kingdom
- Eretz Yisrael 6–1 United Kingdom (Maccabi Ground, Jerusalem)
- Poland 3–0 Lithuania
- Germany 4–1 Romania
- Lithuania 1–0 United Kingdom
- Eretz Yisrael 1–3 Germany (Maccabi Ground, Petah Tikva)
- Eretz Yisrael 1–0 Lithuania
- Poland beat Germany
- Romania beat Lithuania
- Romania beat United Kingdom
- Poland lost to United Kingdom
- Romania beat Poland
- Germany 2–1 Lithuania (Maccabi Ground, Jerusalem)
- Eretz Yisrael 0–1 Romania (Maccabiah Stadium)

Standings
Place	Team name	GP	W	D	L	Pts
1	Romania	5	4	0	1	8
2	Germany	5	4	0	1	8
3	Israel	5	3	0	2	6
4	Poland	5	2	0	3	4
5	United Kingdom	5	1	0	4	2
6	Lithuania	5	1	0	4	2

Per RSSSF
