= Football at the 1932 Maccabiah Games =

Tournament details
- Host country: Mandatory Palestine
- Dates: 28 – 31 March
- Teams: 2
- Venue(s): 2 (in 2 host cities)

Final positions
- Champions: Poland
- Runners-up: Eretz Yisrael

Tournament statistics
- Matches played: 2
- Goals scored: 9 (4.5 per match)

Football at the 1932 Maccabiah Games was held in Mandatory Palestine.

The competition was open for men's teams only. Several Maccabi organizations were invited to send a football team, but only Maccabi Poland sent a team, which joined the host to compete for the tournament's gold medal. Only two matches were held during the tournament and Poland was declared winners after winning the second match.

After the competition the teams met for a third match, played in Jerusalem, which Mandatory Palestine won 4–2.

== Results ==
=== Match 1 ===
28 March 1932

Eretz Yisrael	2–2*	Poland

Maccabiah Stadium, Tel Aviv

=== Match 2 ===
31 March 1932

Eretz Yisrael	2–3	Poland

Maccabi Ground, Petah Tikva

*The first game was ended 15 minutes before the time due to the darkness.
