= Football at the 1953 Maccabiah Games =

Tournament details
- Host country: Israel
- Dates: 21 – 30 September
- Teams: 7
- Venue(s): 5 (in 5 host cities)

Final positions
- Champions: Israel
- Runners-up: South Africa
- Third place: Great Britain
- Fourth place: France

Tournament statistics
- Matches played: 17
- Goals scored: 83 (4.88 per match)

Football at the 1953 Maccabiah Games was held in several stadiums in Israel starting on 28 September.

The competition was open for men's teams only. Teams from 7 countries participated. The tournament was won by the defending champions, Israel.

As part of the closing ceremony, the host and winner, Israel, played an exhibition match against a selected team from the other competing nations. The match, that was played over two halves of 20 minutes, ended goalless.

== Format ==
The seven teams were divided into two group, each team playing the others once. The top two qualified for the medals group, while the rest played for the 5th-7th places.

== Preliminary round ==
=== Group A ===
Team	Pld	W	D	L	GF	GA	Pts
Israel	3	3	0	0	10	1	6
Great Britain	3	2	0	1	6	3	4
Switzerland	3	1	0	2	5	4	2
Finland	3	0	0	3	1	14	0

21 September 1953
Israel	3–1	Great Britain	Maccabi Ground, Rehovot
Switzerland	5–1	Finland	Basa Stadium, Tel Aviv
22 September 1953
Israel	5–0	Finland	Municipal Stadium, Haifa
Great Britain	1–0	Switzerland	Basa Stadium, Tel Aviv
23 September 1953
Israel	2–0	Switzerland	Basa Stadium, Tel Aviv
Great Britain	4–0	Finland	Hapoel Ground, Kfar Saba

=== Group B ===
Team	Pld	W	D	L	GF	GA	Pts
South Africa	2	2	0	0	9	4	4
France	2	1	0	1	5	7	2
United States	2	0	0	2	3	6	0

21 September 1953
South Africa	6–2	France	Basa Stadium, Tel Aviv
22 September 1953
France	3–1	United States	YMCA Stadium, Jerusalem
23 September 1953
South Africa	3–2	United States	Basa Stadium, Tel Aviv

== Final round ==
=== 5th-7th places group ===
Team	Pld	W	D	L	GF	GA	Pts
United States	2	1	1	0	4	1	3
Switzerland	2	1	1	0	5	3	3
Finland	2	0	0	2	2	7	0

27 September 1953
Switzerland	4–2	Finland	Maccabi Ground, Rehovot
28 September 1953
Switzerland	1–1	United States	YMCA Stadium, Jerusalem
29 September 1953
United States	w/o	Finland

=== Medals group ===
Team	Pld	W	D	L	GF	GA	Pts
Israel	3	3	0	0	17	1	6
South Africa	3	2	0	1	5	6	4
Great Britain	3	1	0	2	8	12	2
France	3	0	0	3	3	14	0

25 September 1953
Israel	5–0	France	Basa Stadium, Tel Aviv
South Africa	2–1	Great Britain	Basa Stadium, Tel Aviv
27 September 1953
Israel	4–0	South Africa	Basa Stadium, Tel Aviv
Great Britain	6–2	France	Basa Stadium, Tel Aviv
28 September 1953
Israel	8–1	Great Britain	Basa Stadium, Tel Aviv
South Africa	3–1	France	Basa Stadium, Tel Aviv
