= Football at the 1957 Maccabiah Games =

Tournament details
- Host country: Israel
- Dates: 16 September – 23 September
- Teams: 3
- Venue(s): 6 (in 5 host cities)

Final positions
- Champions: Israel
- Runners-up: Great Britain
- Third place: France

Tournament statistics
- Matches played: 6
- Goals scored: 56 (9.33 per match)

Football at the 1957 Maccabiah Games was held in several stadiums in Israel starting on 16 September.

The competition was open for men's teams only. Teams from 3 countries participated, United Kingdom, France and Israel. The tournament was won by Israel.

== Format ==
The three teams played each other twice in various venues in Israel, for a total of 4 matches for each team.

== Results ==
Team	Pld	W	D	L	GF	GA	Pts
Israel	4	3	1	0	31	4	7
Great Britain	4	2	1	1	23	12	5
France	4	0	0	4	2	40	0

16 September 1957
Great Britain	11–1	France	Hapoel Ground, Kfar Saba
17 September 1957
Israel	8–0	Great Britain	Kiryat Eliezer Stadium, Haifa
18 September 1957
Israel	10–1	France	YMCA Stadium, Jerusalem
20 September 1957
Great Britain	9–0	France	Hapoel Ground, Petah Tikva
22 September 1957
Israel	10–0	France	Maccabi Jaffa Ground, Tel Aviv
23 September 1957
Great Britain	3–3	Israel	Basa Stadium, Tel Aviv
