= Nahum Ta-Shma =

Israeli footballer (born 1953)

Nahum Ta-Shma נחום תא שמע
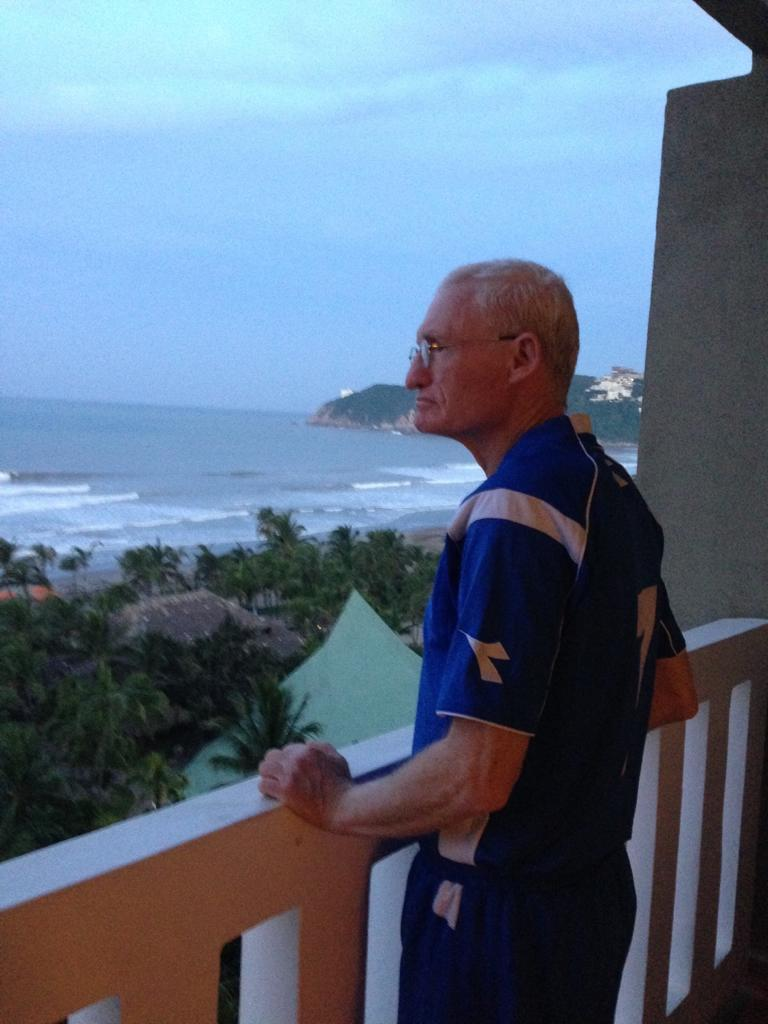
- scout in the TFM group, 2019

Personal information
- Full name: Nahum Ta-Shma
- Date of birth: 22 June 1953 (age 73)
- Place of birth: Jerusalem, Israel
- Position: Midfielder

Youth career
- Hapoel Jerusalem

Senior career*
Years	Team	Apps	(Gls)
1971–1980	Hapoel Jerusalem		
1980–1982	Hapoel Haifa		
1982–1984	Beitar Jerusalem		

International career
1973–1979	Israel	2	(0)

Managerial career
- 1986: Maccabi Ironi Ashdod
- * Club domestic league appearances and goals

Nahum Ta-Shma (Hebrew: נחום תא שמע; born 22 June 1953) is an Israeli footballer.

== Career ==
Ta-Shma played club football for Hapoel Jerusalem Hapoel Haifa and Beitar Jerusalem, won with the club in 1972–73 Israel State Cup when he scored the second goal in the final.

Ta-Shma made two appearance for Israeli national side.

== Honours ==
Hapoel Jerusalem

- Israel State Cup: 1972–73
