= Football at the 1950 Maccabiah Games =

Tournament details
- Host country: Israel
- Dates: 28 September – 6 October
- Teams: 5
- Venue(s): 5 (in 5 host cities)

Final positions
- Champions: Israel
- Runners-up: South Africa
- Third place: Great Britain
- Fourth place: Switzerland

Tournament statistics
- Matches played: 10
- Goals scored: 62 (6.2 per match)

Football at the 1950 Maccabiah Games was the football tournament held as part of the 1950 Maccabiah Games. It was held in several stadiums in Israel and began on 28 September.

The competition was open for men's teams only. Teams from 5 countries participated, after a team from the Netherlands withdrew. The tournament was won by Israel.

== Format ==
The five teams played each other once in various venues in Israel, for a total of 4 matches for each team.

== Results ==
Team	Pld	W	D	L	GF	GA	Pts
Israel	4	4	0	0	18	5	8
South Africa	4	2	1	1	18	7	5
Great Britain	4	2	0	2	7	11	4
Switzerland	4	1	1	2	11	19	3
France	4	0	0	4	8	20	0

28 September 1950
Israel	9–1	Switzerland	YMCA Stadium, Jerusalem
South Africa	6–1	Great Britain	Maccabi Ground. Rehovot
1 October 1950
South Africa	3–3	Switzerland	Hapoel Ground, Petah Tikva
Israel	2–1	Great Britain	Basa Stadium, Tel Aviv
2 October 1950
South Africa	8–1	France	Maccabi Ground, Netanya
4 October 1950
Great Britain	3–2	Switzerland	Maccabi Ground, Rehovot
Israel	5–2	France	Kiryat Haim Stadium, Haifa
5 October 1950
Great Britain	2–0	France	YMCA Stadium, Jerusalem
Israel	2–1	South Africa	Basa Stadium, Tel Aviv
6 October 1950
Switzerland	5–4	France	Maccabi Ground, Netanya
