= Sala Stadium =

Football stadium in Ashkelon, Israel

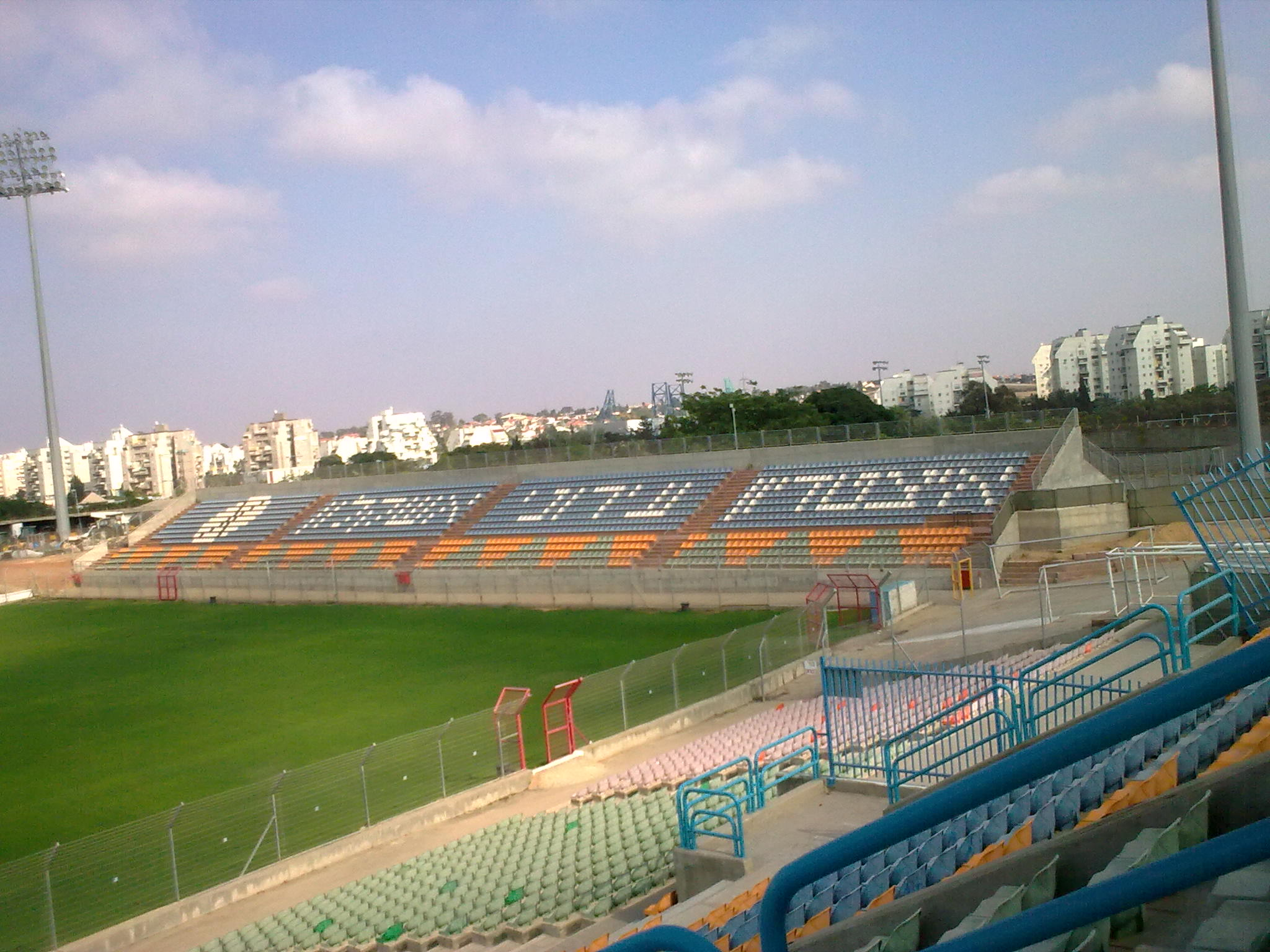
- Interactive map of Sala Stadium
- Location: Ashkelon, Israel
- Coordinates: 31.66571°N 34.569479°E
- Capacity: 5,250 (permitted seats)
- Surface: Grass

Construction
- Expanded: 2002

Tenants
- Maccabi Ashkelon; Maccabi Kiryat Gat (2001)

The Sala Stadium (Hebrew: אצטדיון סלה) is a sports stadium in Ashkelon, Israel. The stadium has a capacity of 5,250 people and is the home ground of Maccabi Ashkelon.

On 29 December 2008, shortly before a training session, the stadium was hit by a Grad rocket fired from the Gaza Strip. The rocket landed in the penalty area.
