= 2011–12 Beitar Jerusalem F.C. season =

Beitar Jerusalem
2011–12 season
- Chairman: (Russia) Arcadi Gaydamak
- Manager: (Israel) Yuval Naim from March 2012 : (Israel) Eli Cohen
- Ligat Ha'Al: 9th
- State Cup: Round of 32
- Toto Cup: Group Stage
- Top goalscorer: League: Amit Ben-Shushan(7); All: Amit Ben-Shushan(7)
- Highest home attendance: 17,500 Vs. Maccabi Haifa (21 November 2011)
- Lowest home attendance: 3,000 Vs. Hapoel Be'er Sheva (17 December 2011)
- Average home league attendance: 7,500
Home colours	Away colours

The 2011–12 season was Beitar Jerusalem's 43rd season in the Israeli Premier League. Until November 2011, Beitar played its home games at Ramat Gan Stadium because its home stadium, Teddy, was being renovated.

== First team ==
Note: Flags indicate national team as defined under FIFA eligibility rules; some limited exceptions apply. Players may hold more than one non-FIFA nationality.

No.	Pos.	Nation	Player
1	GK	ISR	Ariel Harush
2	DF	ISR	Eli Dasa
3	DF	ISR	Haim Megrelashvili (on loan from Maccabi Haifa)
4	DF	ISR	Tal Kahila
5	DF	ISR	Matan Barashi
6	DF	ISR	Tomer Ben Yosef
7	FW	ISR	Amit Ben Shushan (vice captain)
8	MF	ISR	Aviram Baruchyan (captain)
9	MF	ISR	Dan Einbinder
10	FW	ISR	Liron Diamant
11	FW	BRA	Leo
15	MF	ISR	Shai Haddad
16	MF	ISR	Evyatar Baruchyan
17	MF	ISR	Zahi Elihen
18	MF	ISR	Avi Rikan

No.	Pos.	Nation	Player
21	MF	ISR	Kobi Moyal
22	GK	ISR	Ohad Saidof
23	MF	ARG	Dario Fernandez
24	MF	ISR	Ofir Kriaf
26	MF	ISR	Steven Cohen
27	FW	ISR	Omer Nachmani
28	MF	ISR	Barak Moshe
39	DF	UKR	Andriy Pylyavskyi (on loan from Maccabi Haifa)
99	FW	ISR	Eran Levy

== Ligat Ha'Al (Premier League) ==
=== Regular season ===
Pos	Team	Pld	W	D	L	GF	GA	GD	Pts	Qualification
9	Hapoel Acre	30	10	8	12	41	37	+4	38	Qualification for the relegation round
10	Ironi Nir Ramat HaSharon	30	9	10	11	29	38	−9	37	Qualification for the relegation round
11	Beitar Jerusalem (Note: Beitar Jerusalem were deducted two points for racist taunts from the crowd.)	30	10	6	14	22	39	−17	34	Qualification for the relegation round
12	Hapoel Haifa	30	8	8	14	33	38	−5	32	Qualification for the relegation round
13	Hapoel Be'er Sheva	30	9	5	16	33	54	−21	32	Qualification for the relegation round

Source: Israel Football Association
Rules for classification: 1st points; 2nd goal difference; 3rd matches won; 4th goals scored; 5th head-to-head; 6th decision match
Notes:

27 August 2011 2	Beitar Jerusalem	3 – 1	Hapoel Acre	Ramat Gan, Israel
19:30	Ben Shushan 4', 17'; E.Baruchyan 68'		Sallaich 65'	Stadium: Ramat Gan Stadium; Attendance: 5,500; Referee: Daniel Bar Natan

30 August 2011 1	Hapoel Be'er Sheva	0 – 1	Beitar Jerusalem	Be'er Sheva, Israel
20:00			Ben Shushan 60'	Stadium: Vasermil Stadium; Attendance: 6,000; Referee: Shay Shitrit

11 September 2011 3	Hapoel Tel Aviv	1 – 0	Beitar Jerusalem	Tel Aviv, Israel
20:50	Damari 83'			Stadium: Bloomfield Stadium; Attendance: 14,500; Referee: Meir Levi

17 September 2011 4	Beitar Jerusalem	1 – 0	Hapoel Haifa	Ramat Gan, Israel
20:45	Einbinder 51'			Stadium: Ramat Gan Stadium; Attendance: 5,000; Referee: Asaf Keinan

21 September 2011 5	Maccabi Netanya	1 – 1	Beitar Jerusalem	Netanya, Israel
20:35	Saba 63'		Ben Shushan 53'	Stadium: Kufsa Stadium; Attendance: 4,300; Referee: Moshe Bohbot

24 September 2011 6	Beitar Jerusalem	1 – 2	Hapoel Petah Tikva	Ramat Gan, Israel
19:30	Luzun 15'; Fishbein 16'		Harush (red card) 11'; Ben Shushan 78'	Stadium: Ramat Gan Stadium; Attendance: 5,500; Referee: Alon Yeffet

1 October 2011 7	FC Ashdod	3 – 0	Beitar Jerusalem	Ashdod, Israel
19:30	Revivo 48'; Shriki 56'; Ben Lulu 62'			Stadium: Yud Alef Stadium; Attendance: 4,000; Referee: Orel Greenfeld

17 October 2011 8	Beitar Jerusalem	1 – 1	Hapoel Rishon LeZion	Ramat Gan, Israel
20:00	A.Baruchyan 37'		Gomez 23'	Stadium: Ramat Gan Stadium; Attendance: 5,000; Referee: Asaf Keinan

24 October 2012 9	Bnei Sakhnin	3 – 0	Beitar Jerusalem	Sakhnin, Israel
20:50	Kadusi 7'; Damahau 61'; Azuruv 85'			Stadium: Doha Stadium; Attendance: 7,000; Referee: Meir Levi

30 October 2011 10	Beitar Jerusalem	0 – 1	Ramat HaSharon	Ramat Gan, Israel
20:10			Ben Shabbat 7'	Stadium: Ramat Gan Stadium; Attendance: 4,200; Referee: Menasha Mashiah

7 November 2011 11	Maccabi Tel Aviv	0 – 1	Beitar Jerusalem	Ramat Gan, Israel
20:50			Ben Shushan 67'	Stadium: Ramat Gan Stadium; Attendance: 17,500; Referee: Daniel Bar Natan

21 November 2011 12	Beitar Jerusalem	1 – 4	Maccabi Haifa	Jerusalem, Israel
20:50	Cohen 10'		Amashe 27', 89'; Dvalashvili 61', 65'	Stadium: Teddy Stadium; Attendance: 17,500; Referee: Meir Levi

26 November 2011 13	Kiryat Shmona	1 – 0	Beitar Jerusalem	Kiryat Shmona, Israel
17:00	Abuhatzira 64'			Stadium: Kiryat Shmona Municipal Stadium; Attendance: 3,000; Referee: Alon Yefet

2 December 2011 14	Beitar Jerusalem	0 – 0	Maccabi Petah Tikva	Jerusalem, Israel
19:30				Stadium: Teddy Stadium; Attendance: 5,500; Referee: Eitan Shmuelevich

11 December 2011 15	Bnei Yehuda	3 – 0	Beitar Jerusalem	Tel Aviv, Israel
20:00	Galvan 31', 45'; Pylyavskyi 89' (o.g.)			Stadium: Bloomfield Stadium; Attendance: 5,500; Referee: Haim Yaa'kov

17 December 2011 16	Beitar Jerusalem	0 – 1	Hapoel Be'er Sheva	Jerusalem, Israel
17:20	Reikan (red card) 30'		Exbrad 83'	Stadium: Teddy Stadium; Attendance: 3,000; Referee: Menashe Mashiah

25 December 2011 17	Hapoel Acre	1 – 1	Beitar Jerusalem	Acre, Israel
19:10	Falzuck 60'		Einbinder 76'	Stadium: Acre Municipal Stadium; Attendance: 3,500; Referee: Alon Yeffet

28 December 2011 18	Beitar Jerusalem	1 – 1	Hapoel Tel Aviv	Ramat Gan, Israel
20:50	Diamant 80'		Tamuz 10'	Stadium: Ramat Gan Stadium *redius game Attendance: 14,000; Referee: Liran Liani

1 January 2012 19	Hapoel Haifa	3 – 0	Beitar Jerusalem	Haifa, Israel
20:00	Arel 13'; Avidor 75'; Kiwan 90+2'			Stadium: Kiryat Eliezer Stadium; Attendance: 5,500; Referee: Ziv Adler

7 January 2012 20	Beitar Jerusalem	2 – 1	Maccabi Netanya	Jerusalem, Israel
17:30	Cohen 26', 86'		Nahum 75'	Stadium: Teddy Stadium; Attendance: 5,000; Referee: Eli Hakmon

15 January 2012 21	Hapoel Petah Tikva	0 – 1	Beitar Jerusalem	Petah Tikva, Israel
19:45			Passos 5'	Stadium: HaMoshava Stadium; Attendance: 6,500; Referee: Meir Levi

21 January 2012 22	Beitar Jerusalem	1 – 0	FC Ashdod	Jerusalem, Israel
20:00	Passos 21'			Stadium: Teddy Stadium; Attendance: 7,500; Referee: Haim Yaakov

28 January 2012 23	Hapoel Rishon LeZion	2 – 0	Beitar Jerusalem	Rishon LeZion, Israel
19:30	Musa 7'; Ubsinkov 11'			Stadium: Habarfeld Stadium; Attendance: 4,500; Referee: Shai Shitrit

4 February 2012 24	Beitar Jerusalem	0 – 3	Bnei Sakhnin	Jerusalem, Israel
18:15			Kasoum 36'; Kadusi 70'; Elkayam 80'	Stadium: Teddy Stadium; Attendance: 8,500; Referee: Meir Levi

11 February 2012 25	Ramat HaSharon	2 – 0	Beitar Jerusalem	Ramat Gan, Israel
20:20	Masudi 68'; Barel 90+3'			Stadium: Winter Stadium; Attendance: 1,800; Referee: Liran Vaksberger

20 February 2012 26	Beitar Jerusalem	0 – 0	Maccabi Tel Aviv	Jerusalem, Israel
20:50				Stadium: Teddy Stadium; Attendance: 9,500; Referee: Alon Yeffet

26 February 2012 27	Maccabi Haifa	1 – 0	Beitar Jerusalem	Haifa, Israel
20:50	Gadir 33'			Stadium: Kiryat Eliezer Stadium; Attendance: 13,500; Referee: Liran Liani

3 March 2012 28	Beitar Jerusalem	1 – 0	Ironi Kiryat Shmona	Jerusalem, Israel
19:30	Levy 90+3'			Stadium: Teddy Stadium; Attendance: 4,500; Referee: Meir Levi

10 March 2012 29	Maccabi Petah Tikva	2 – 3	Beitar Jerusalem	Petah Tikva, Israel
20:00	Golan 17', 72'		Reikan 13', 35'; Passos 20'	Stadium: HaMoshava Stadium; Attendance: 8,500; Referee: Alon Yeffet

19 March 2012 30	Beitar Jerusalem	2 – 1	Bnei Yehuda	Jerusalem, Israel
19:30	Cohen 80'; Ben Shushan 90+2'		Raly 50'	Stadium: Teddy Stadium; Attendance: 10,000; Referee: Ziv Adler

=== Bottom playoff ===
Pos	Team	Pld	W	D	L	GF	GA	GD	Pts	Relegation
9	Beitar Jerusalem (Note: Beitar Jerusalem were deducted two points for racist taunts from the crowd.)	37	15	7	15	32	44	−12	50	
10	Hapoel Acre	37	13	9	15	51	45	+6	48	
11	Ironi Nir Ramat HaSharon	37	11	13	13	37	45	−8	46	
12	Hapoel Haifa	37	11	11	15	41	43	−2	44	
13	Hapoel Be'er Sheva	37	12	7	18	41	61	−20	43	
14	Maccabi Petah Tikva (Note: Maccabi Petah Tikva were deducted three points after the team staff headbutted and kicked Hapoel Haifa player Ali El-Khatib after the match.) (R)	37	11	10	16	39	57	−18	40	Relegation to Liga Leumit
15	Hapoel Rishon LeZion (R)	37	6	9	22	39	70	−31	27	Relegation to Liga Leumit
16	Hapoel Petah Tikva (Note: Hapoel Petah Tikva were deducted nine points for entering administration.) (R)	37	8	11	18	36	55	−19	26	Relegation to Liga Leumit

Source: Israel Football Association
Rules for classification: 1st points; 2nd goal difference; 3rd matches won; 4th goals scored; 5th head-to-head; 6th decision match
(R) Relegated
Notes:

25 March 2012 31	Beitar Jerusalem	3 – 1	Maccabi Petah Tikva	Ramat Gan, Israel
19:30	Einbinder 48'; Moyal 53'; Cohen 53'		Kabaha 50'	Stadium: Ramat Gan Stadium *Redius game Attendance: 10,000; Referee: Meir Levi

31 March 2012 32	Hapoel Rishon LeZion	1 – 2	Beitar Jerusalem	Rishon LeZion, Israel
20:00	Ubisinkov 89'		Levy 77', 79'	Stadium: Habarfeld Stadium; Attendance: 5,500; Referee: Alon Yeffet

15 April 2012 33	Beitar Jerusalem	1 – 0	Hapoel Acre	Jerusalem, Israel
20:00	Reikan 44'			Stadium: Teddy Stadium; Attendance: 7,500; Referee: Moshe Bohbot

29 April 2012 34	Ramat HaSharon	0 – 1	Beitar Jerusalem	Ramat HaSharon, Israel
20:00			Reikan 81'	Stadium: Grondman Stadium; Attendance: 2,700; Referee: Halim Zatma

5 May 2012 35	Beitar Jerusalem	2 – 0	Hapoel Petah Tikva	Jerusalem, Israel
17:40	Elihen 15'; Diamant 91'			Stadium: Teddy Stadium; Attendance: 7,500; Referee: Ido Bronstein

8 May 2012 36	Beitar Jerusalem	0 – 0	Hapoel Haifa	Jerusalem, Israel
19:00				Stadium: Teddy Stadium; Attendance: 7,000; Referee: Alon Yeffet

12 May 2012 37	Hapoel Be'er Sheva	3 – 1	Beitar Jerusalem	Be'er Sheva, Israel
21:00	Gabay 6', 45'; Shivhon 15'		Einbinder 33'	Stadium: Vasermil Stadium; Attendance: 10,000; Referee: Eitan Shmuelevich

== State Cup ==
Date	Round	Opponents	H / A	Result F – A	Scorers	Attendance
7 February 2012	Round of 32	Bnei Lod	A	0–0 (4-3p)		4,000

== Toto Cup ==
=== Group D ===
Pos	Team	Pld	W	D	L	GF	GA	GD	Pts
1	F.C. Ironi Ashdod (A)	3	1	2	0	5	4	+1	5
2	Hapoel Be'er Sheva (A)	3	1	1	1	5	3	+2	4
3	Beitar Jerusalem	3	1	1	1	3	5	−2	4
4	Hapoel Rishon LeZion	3	1	0	2	3	4	−1	3

Source: football.org.il (in Hebrew)
Rules for classification: 1st points; 2nd goal difference; 3rd matches won; 4th goals scored; 5th head-to-head; 6th decision match
(A) Advanced to the quarterfinals

Date	Opponents	H / A	Result F – A	Scorers	Attendance
30 July 2011	FC Ashdod	A	2 – 2	Cohen 45',84';	2,500
6 August 2011	Hapoel Be'er Sheva	A	3 – 0		3,000
14 August 2011	Rishon LeZion	H	1 – 0	Nahmani 14'	2,000

== Statistics ==
=== Facts ===
Top scorer in league : Amit Ben Shushan (7)
Top scorer in all competitions : Amit Ben Shushan and Steven Cohen (7)
Top assist in league : Steven Cohen (5)
Biggest Home Win : 3-1 vs Maccabi Petah Tikva (25 March 2012)
Biggest Away Win : 2-3 vs Maccabi Petah Tikva (10 March 2012)
Biggest Home Losing : 1-4 vs Maccabi Haifa (21 November 2011)
Biggest Away Losing : 3-0 vs Hapoel Haifa (1 January 2012)
Longest winning run : From 3 March - 8 May 2012 (8 games)
Longest unbeating run : From 3 March - 12 May 2012 (9 games)
Longest losing run : From 28 January - 20 February 2012 (3 games)
Longest winless run : From 7 November 2011 - 7 January 2012 (8 games)
Highest home attendance : 17,500 vs Maccabi Haifa (21 November 2011)
Lowest home attendance : 3,000 vs Hapoel Be'er Sheva (17 December 2011)
Average home attendance : 6,500

=== Starting 11 ===
4–3–3 Formation
