= 2012–13 Beitar Jerusalem F.C. season =

Beitar Jerusalem
2012–13 season
- Chairman: Arcadi Gaydamak
- Manager: Eli Cohen
- Ligat Ha'Al: 10th
- State Cup: Quarter finals
- Toto Cup: Group stage
- Top goalscorer: League: Avi Reikan(11); All: Avi Reikan(11)
- Highest home attendance: 29,000 vs. Maccabi Tel Aviv (10 December 2012)
- Lowest home attendance: 1,700 vs. Hapoel Ramat Gan F.C. (17 March 2013)
- Average home league attendance: 7,500
Home colours	Away colours

The 2012–13 season was Beitar Jerusalem's 44th season in the Israeli Premier League. Beitar started the season with two victories vs its enemy Hapoel Tel Aviv.

Chairman Arcadi Gaydamak decided to bring two Muslim-Russian players Zaur Sadayev and Dzhabrail Kadiyev from Terek Grozny FC. This proved controversial with many Beitar fans, and the new signings were subject to verbal abuse from the stands. The hardcore right-wing fan group "La familia" were behind much of this, and organised a boycott for part of the season.

The two Chechen players signed with Beitar near the top of the table. Their arrival triggered a losing run which eventually left Beitar at the bottom of the table, narrowly avoiding relegation.

== First team ==
Note: Flags indicate national team as defined under FIFA eligibility rules; some limited exceptions apply. Players may hold more than one non-FIFA nationality.

No.	Pos.	Nation	Player
1	GK	ISR	Ariel Harush
2	DF	ISR	Eli Dasa
3	DF	ISR	Haim Megrelashvili (on loan from Maccabi Haifa)
4	DF	ISR	Tal Kachila
5	DF	ISR	Matan Barashi
7	FW	ISR	Amit Ben Shushan (captain)
11	FW	ISR	Hen Azriel (on loan from Maccabi Haifa)
13	FW	RUS	Zaur Sadayev
15	MF	ISR	Shai Haddad
16	MF	ISR	Evyatar Baruchyan
17	MF	ISR	Tzahi Elihen
18	MF	ISR	Avi Rikan

No.	Pos.	Nation	Player
19	MF	CRO	Dominik Glavina
21	MF	ISR	Kobi Moyal
22	GK	ISR	Ohad Saidof
23	MF	ARG	Dario Fernandez
24	MF	ISR	Ofir Kriaf
25	DF	CRO	Dino Škvorc
26	MF	ISR	Steven Cohen
27	FW	ISR	Omer Nachmani
28	MF	ISR	Barak Moshe
44	DF	RUS	Dzhabrail Kadiyev
99	FW	ISR	Eran Levy

== Ligat Ha'Al (Premier League) ==
=== Regular season ===
25 August 2012 1	Ironi Kiryat Shmona	3 – 2	Beitar Jerusalem	Kiryat Shmona, Israel
20:00	Badash 1'; Lsecne 10'; Hasarma 90+3'		Reikan 13'; Diamant 90'	Stadium: Kiryat Shmona Stadium; Attendance: 3,500; Referee: Eitan Shmuelevich

1 September 2012 2	Beitar Jerusalem	1 – 1	Hapoel Be'er Sheva	Jerusalem, Israel
20:00	Dasa 40'		Swisa 52'	Stadium: Teddy Stadium; Attendance: 5,500; Referee: Shay Shitrit

13 September 2012 3	FC Ashdod	2 – 1	Beitar Jerusalem	Ashdod, Israel
20:00	Revivo 18'; Makriev 20'		Levy 75'	Stadium: Yud Alef Stadium; Attendance: 3,000; Referee: Daniel Bar-Natan

22 September 2012 4	Beitar Jerusalem	0 – 1	Hapoel Acre	Jerusalem, Israel
20:00			Taga 67'	Stadium: Teddy Stadium; Attendance: 5,000; Referee: Liran Liani

29 September 2012 5	Hapoel Ramat Gan	2 – 2	Beitar Jerusalem	Ramat Gan, Israel
20:10	Manga 75'; Zaguri 88'		Ben Shushan 7'; Levy 76'	Stadium: Ramat Gan Stadium; Attendance: 3,800; Referee: Erez Papir

21 October 2012 7	Bnei Yehuda	1 – 2	Beitar Jerusalem	Tel Aviv, Israel
20:00	Galvan 81'		Ben Shushan 20'; Reikan 52'	Stadium: Bloomfield Stadium; Attendance: 5,800; Referee: Roei Reinshreiver

29 October 2012 6	Beitar Jerusalem	3 – 2	Hapoel Tel Aviv	Jerusalem, Israel
20:50	Ben Shushan 2'; Azriel 71,76'		Ben Haim 39'; Tamuz 65'; Tamuz (red card) 65'	Stadium: Teddy Stadium; Attendance: 20,000; Referee: Orel Greenfeld

3 November 2012 8	Beitar Jerusalem	1 – 0	Ramat HaSharon	Jerusalem, Israel
19:30	Reikan 90+3'			Stadium: Teddy Stadium; Attendance: 8,000; Referee: Asaf Keinan

10 November 2012 9	Bnei Sahknin	1 – 1	Beitar Jerusalem	Sakhnin, Israel
20:10	Bello 14'		Reikan 48'	Stadium: Doha Stadium; Attendance: 7,000; Referee: Daniel Bar-Natan

18 November 2012 10	Beitar Jerusalem	3 – 0	Hapoel Haifa	Jerusalem, Israel
20:10	Azriel 6'; Glavina 55'; Škvorc 73'			Stadium: Teddy Stadium; Attendance: 8,200; Referee: Alon Yefet

26 November 2012 11	Beitar Jerusalem	1 – 2	Maccabi Haifa	Jerusalem, Israel
20:50	Moyal 37'		Megrelashvili 13' (o.g.); Ezra 42'	Stadium: Teddy Stadium; Attendance: 18,500; Referee: Menashe Mashiah

1 December 2012 12	Maccabi Netanya	2 – 3	Beitar Jerusalem	Netanya, Israel
19:30	Ceran 26'; Lopo 76'		Reikan 13,90+3'; Levy 67'	Stadium: Netanya Stadium; Attendance: 6,500; Referee: Eli Hakmon

10 December 2012 13	Beitar Jerusalem	1 – 1	Maccabi Tel Aviv	Ramat Gan, Israel
20:50	Moyal 63'		Atar 51'	Stadium: Ramat Gan Stadium *Redius Game; Attendance: 29,000; Referee: Daniel Bar-Natan

16 December 2012 14	Beitar Jerusalem	2 – 2	Ironi Kiryat Shmona	Petah Tikva, Israel
20:15	Reikan 2'; Azriel 60'		Sallaich 17'; Mizrahi 53'	Stadium: HaMoshava Stadium *Redius Game; Attendance: 7,500; Referee: Liran Liani

23 December 2012 15	Hapoel Be'er Sheva	0 – 0	Beitar Jerusalem	Be'er Sheva, Israel
20:15				Stadium: Vasermil Stadium; Attendance: 7,500; Referee: Orel Greenfeld

31 December 2012 16	Beitar Jerusalem	1 – 1	FC Ashdod	Jerusalem, Israel
20:50	Azriel 55'		Biton 80'	Stadium: Teddy Stadium; Attendance: 8,500; Referee: Menashe Mashiah

5 January 2013 17	Hapoel Acre	2 – 3	Beitar Jerusalem	Acre, Israel
20:00	Marinkovich 9'; Mishaelof 62'		Megrelashvili 5'; Azriel 19'; Kriaf 73'	Stadium: Acre Municipal Stadium; Attendance: 3,500; Referee: Shay Shitrit

13 January 2013 18	Beitar Jerusalem	3 – 2	Hapoel Ramat Gan	Jerusalem, Israel
20:15	Levy 20'; Glavina 34,50'		Manga 40'; Hemo 73'	Stadium: Teddy Stadium; Attendance: 8,000; Referee: Daniel Bar Natan

21 January 2013 19	Hapoel Tel Aviv	0 – 2	Beitar Jerusalem	Tel Aviv, Israel
20:50			Azriel 74'; Reikan 81'	Stadium: Bloomfield Stadium; Attendance: 14,500; Referee: Alon Yefet

26 January 2013 20	Beitar Jerusalem	0 – 1	Bnei Yehuhda	Jerusalem, Israel
19:30			Agayev 43'	Stadium: Teddy Stadium; Attendance: 9,000; Referee: Liran Vaksbergar

3 February 2013 21	Ramat HaSharon	1 – 0	Beitar Jerusalem	Ramat HaSharon, Israel
20:05	Nousbaum 83'			Stadium: Grondman Stadium; Attendance: 3,500; Referee: Alon Yefet

10 February 2013 22	Beitar Jerusalem	2 – 2	Bnei Sakhnin	Jerusalem, Israel
20:15	Levy 71'; Cohen 85'		Kalibat 27,37'	Stadium: Teddy Stadium; Attendance: 7,500; Referee: Menashe Mashiah

17 February 2013 23	Hapoel Haifa	3 – 0	Beitar Jerusalem	Haifa, Israel
20:10	Glushashvich 33,68'; Barashi 57' (o.g.)			Stadium: Kiryat Eliezer Stadium; Attendance: 5,500; Referee: Ziv Adler

24 February 2013 24	Maccabi Haifa	4 – 1	Beitar Jerusalem	Haifa, Israel
20:50	Katan 21'; Amashe 28,65'; Turgeman 90+2'		Pylyavskyi 43' (o.g.)	Stadium: Kiryat Eliezer Stadium; Attendance: 13,500; Referee: Eli Hakmon

3 March 2013 25	Beitar Jerusalem	1 – 1	Maccabi Netanya	Jerusalem, Israel
20:15	Sadayev 48'		Ben Harush 76'	Stadium: Teddy Stadium; Attendance: 6,000; Referee: Orel Grinfeeld

10 March 2013 26	Maccabi Tel Aviv	5 – 0	Beitar Jerusalem	Tel Aviv, Israel
20:50	Zahavi 9'; Prica 55'; Atar 58'; Dabour 84,86'			Stadium: Bloomfield Stadium; Attendance: 14,500; Referee: Menashe Mashiah

Pos	Team	Pld	W	D	L	GF	GA	GD	Pts	Qualification
6	Ironi Nir Ramat HaSharon	26	11	4	11	28	30	−2	37	Qualification for the championship round
7	F.C. Ashdod	26	10	5	11	30	30	0	35	Qualification for the relegation round
8	Beitar Jerusalem	26	8	9	9	36	42	−6	33	Qualification for the relegation round
9	Hapoel Be'er Sheva	26	7	9	10	23	35	−12	30	Qualification for the relegation round
10	Hapoel Haifa	26	6	10	10	28	40	−12	28	Qualification for the relegation round

Source: Israel Football Association
Rules for classification: 1st points; 2nd goal difference; 3rd matches won; 4th goals scored; 5th head-to-head; 6th decision match

=== Bottom playoff ===
17 March 2013 27	Beitar Jerusalem	1 – 2	Hapoel Ramat Gan	Jerusalem, Israel
20:05	Reikan 25'		Zandberg 13'; Zaguri 60'	Stadium: Teddy Stadium; Attendance: 1,700; Referee: Eitan Shmuelevich

1 April 2013 28	FC Ashdod	2 – 2	Beitar Jerusalem	Ashdod, Israel
20:50	Dasa 11' (o.g.); Ben Zion 34'		Ben Shushan 41,64'	Stadium: Yud Alef Stadium; Attendance: 2,000; Referee: Shay Shitrit

8 April 2013 29	Beitar Jerusalem	2 – 2	Hapoel Acre	Jerusalem, Israel
20:45	Ben Shushan 10'; Azriel 30'		Shavtai 80,90+2'	Stadium: Teddy Stadium; Attendance: 3,000; Referee: Asaf Keinan

13 April 2013 30	Beitar Jerusalem	1 – 0	Hapoel Be'er Sheva	Jerusalem, Israel
20:00	Reikan 62'			Stadium: Teddy Stadium; Attendance: 3,500; Referee: Daniel Bar-Natan

20 April 2013 31	Hapoel Haifa	3 – 1	Beitar Jerusalem	Haifa, Israel
19:15	Glusheshvich 11'; Arel 30'; Abukarat 90+1'		Ben Shushan 35'	Stadium: Kiryat Eliezer Stadium; Attendance: 4,000; Referee: Alon Yefet

27 April 2013 32	Beitar Jerusalem	1 – 3	Maccabi Netanya	Jerusalem, Israel
19:10	Reikan 15'		Mugrabi 28'; Shivhon 43'; Saba 80'	Stadium: Teddy Stadium; Attendance: 2,900; Referee: Eli Hakmon

4 May 2013 33	Bnei Sakhnin	0 – 0	Beitar Jerusalem	Sakhnin, Israel
19:10			Sadayev (red card) 39'	Stadium: Doha Stadium; Attendance: 8,000; Referee: Alon Yefet

Pos	Team	Pld	W	D	L	GF	GA	GD	Pts	Qualification or relegation
7	F.C. Ashdod	33	12	7	14	38	40	−2	43	
8	Hapoel Be'er Sheva	33	10	11	12	32	39	−7	41	
9	Hapoel Haifa	33	9	12	12	36	45	−9	39	
10	Beitar Jerusalem	33	9	12	12	44	54	−10	39	
11	Hapoel Acre	33	8	13	12	39	48	−9	37	
12	Bnei Sakhnin	33	8	13	12	31	49	−18	37	
13	Maccabi Netanya (R)	33	8	11	14	38	50	−12	35	Relegation to Liga Leumit
14	Hapoel Ramat Gan (R)	33	7	9	17	39	48	−9	30	Europa League qualifying and relegation to Liga Leumit (Note: Hapoel Ramat Gan qualified for the Europa League third qualifying of the 2013–14 UEFA Europa League after winning the 2012–13 Israel State Cup.)

Source: Israel Football Association
Rules for classification: 1st points; 2nd goal difference; 3rd matches won; 4th goals scored; 5th head-to-head; 6th decision match
(R) Relegated

== State Cup ==
Date	Round	Opponents	H / A	Result F – A	Scorers	Attendance
29 January 2013	Round of 32	Um Al-Fahm F.C.	H	5–0	Levy 8',38',53'; Glavina 64',89'	8,000
27 February 2013	Round of 16	Maccabi Tel Aviv	A	0–2	Azriel 30'; Glavina 90'	14,500
13 April 2013	Quarter Final	Maccabi Haifa	H	0–3		12,000

== Toto Cup ==
=== Group C ===
Pos	Team	Pld	W	D	L	GF	GA	GD	Pts
1	Hapoel Be'er Sheva (A)	4	2	2	0	7	3	+4	8
2	Hapoel Ramat Gan (A)	4	2	1	1	9	5	+4	7
3	Ironi Nir Ramat HaSharon (A)	4	1	2	1	5	5	0	5
4	Beitar Jerusalem	4	1	2	1	5	6	−1	5
5	F.C. Ironi Ashdod	4	0	1	3	1	8	−7	1

Source: football.org.il (in Hebrew)
Rules for classification: 1st points; 2nd goal difference; 3rd matches won; 4th goals scored; 5th head-to-head; 6th decision match
(A) Advanced to the quarterfinals

Date	Opponents	H / A	Result F – A	Scorers	Attendance
4 August 2012	Hapoel Be'er Sheva	H	0 – 2		3,500
8 August 2012	Ironi Ramat Hasharon	A	2 – 2	Levy 34'; Elihen 56';	1,000
11 August 2012	FC Ashdod	H	0 – 0		1,000
19 August 2012	Hapoel Ramat-Gan	A	2 – 3	Levy 5', 57' Elihen 90'	1,500

== Statistics ==
=== Goals ===
Rank	Player	Position	Ligat Ha'Al	State Cup	Toto Cup	Total
1	(Israel) Avi Reikan	MF	11	0	0	11
2	(Israel) Eran Levy	FW	5	3	3	11
3	(Israel) Hen Azriel	FW	8	1	0	9
4	(Israel) Amit Ben-Shushan	FW	7	0	0	7
5	(Croatia) Dominik Glavina	MF	3	3	0	6
6	(Israel) Kobi Moyal	MF	2	0	0	2
6	(Israel) Tzahi Elihen	MF	0	0	2	2
8	(Israel) Haim Megrelashvili	DF	1	0	0	1
8	(Israel) Ofir Kriaf	MF	1	0	0	1
8	(Israel) Eli Dasa	DF	1	0	0	1
8	(Israel) Steven Cohen	MF	1	0	0	1
8	(Croatia) Dino Škvorc	DF	1	0	0	1
8	(Israel) Liron Diamant	FW	1	0	0	1
8	(Russia) Zaur Sadayev	FW	1	0	0	1
Own goals			1	0	0	1
Total			43	7	5	55

=== Overall ===
	Total	Home	Away	Neutral
Games played	40	21	19	0
Games won	12	6	6	0
Games drawn	14	8	6	0
Games lost	14	7	7	1
Biggest win	5–0 vs Umm al-Fahm			
Biggest loss	5–0 vs Maccabi Tel Aviv			
Biggest win (League)	3–0 vs Hapoel Haifa			
Biggest win (Cup)	5–0 vs Umm al-Fahm			
Biggest loss (League)	5–0 vs Maccabi Tel Aviv			
Biggest loss (Cup)	0-3 vs Maccabi Haifa			
Clean sheets	9	5	4	0
Goals scored	55	29	26	0
Goals conceded	63	28	35	0
Goal difference	-8	+1	-9	0
Average GF per game	1.38	1.38	1.37	0
Average GA per game	1.58	1.33	1.84	0
Yellow cards	102	*	*	*
Red cards	2	1	1	0
Most appearances	(Israel) Ariel Harush (39)	–		
Most goals	(Israel) Avi Reikan (11)	–		
Most assists	(Israel) Eran Levy (6)	–		
Points	50/120 (41.67%)	26/63 (41.27%)	24/57 (42.11%)	0
Winning rate	30%	28.57%	31.58%	0

Last updated: 5 May 2013
Source: Competitive matches

=== Starting 11 ===
4–3–3 formation
