= List of Beitar Jerusalem F.C. seasons =

This is a list of seasons played by Beitar Jerusalem Football Club in Israeli and European football, from 1936 (when the club first started to form) to the most recent completed season. It details the club's achievements in major competitions, and the top scorers for each season. Top scorers in bold were also the top scorers in the Israeli league that season.

The club has won the League Championship six times, the State Cup eight times and the Toto Cup two times.

== History ==
Beitar Jerusalem Football Club was established in 1936 in the city of Jerusalem. Beitar is the only Israeli team that won the PeaceCup in 2001 after win A.S. Roma 1–0.

This is a list of seasons played by Beitar Jerusalem Football Club in Israeli and European football, from 1945–46 (when the club first competed in the cup) to the most recent completed season. It details the club's achievements in major competitions, and the top scorers for each season. Top scorers in bold were also the top scorers in the Israeli league that season. Records of minor competitions such as the Lilian Cup are not included due to them being considered of less importance than the State Cup and the Toto Cup.

== History ==
Beitar Jerusalem was established in 1936, and initially played in the Jerusalem area only, due to travel difficulties. In 1946 the club first played in a national tournament, and joined Liga Bet the following season, although the club withdrew shortly after the season started. The club was first promoted to the top division in 1954, spending one season at the top division before immediately dropping back to the second division. The club returned to the top division in 1968, and it played at the top division ever since, with the exception of two seasons. The club won its first major trophy in 1976, winning the State Cup, and its first championship in 1987. In total, the club won 6 league championships, 8 State Cups and 2 Toto Cups

== Seasons ==
Season	League									State Cup	League Cup	International (Asia/Europe)	Top goalscorer (Note: Goals in all competitions (Liga Leumit or Liga Al, State Cup, Toto Cup and European) are counted.)	
Season	Division	P	W	D	L	F	A	Pts	Pos	State Cup	League Cup	International (Asia/Europe)	Name	Goals
1945–46	–	–	–	–	–	–	–	–	–	R2	–	–		
1946–47	Bet South (2)	–	–	–	–	–	–	–	– (Note: The club withdrew from the league shortly after the season started.)	R1	–	–		
1947–48	Bet South (2) (Note: The 1947–48 league was abandoned due to the 1948 Arab–Israeli War.)	4	3	0	0	17	6	6	2nd	–	–	–		
1948–49	–	–	–	–	–	–	–	–	–	R1 (Note: The 1949 cup competition was delayed by appeals after the completion of the quarter-finals. After settling the appeals three further matches were played in February 1951, and the competition was abandoned.)	–	–		
1949–50	Meuhedet South (2)	16	9	1	6	37	21	19	5th	R1	–	–		
1950–51	–	–	–	–	–	–	–	–	–	R1	–	–		
1951–52	Bet South (2)	26	11	5	10	45	50	27	8th	R2	–	–		
1952–53	–	–	–	–	–	–	–	–	–	Round of 16	–	–		
1953–54	Bet South (2)	26	20	2	4	76	26	42	1st	Round of 16	–	–		
1954–55	Alef (1)	26	8	5	13	37	59	21	11th (Note: The club played a relegation/promotion against 12th placed Hapoel Kfar Saba and the two top placed teams from 1954–55 Liga Bet, Maccabi Jaffa and Hapoel Kiryat Haim. In the play-offs, which were played as a single round-robin tournament, Beitar Jerusalem finished last, dropping to the second division.)	R3	–	–		
1955–56	Alef (2)	21 (Note: An 18th round match between Hapoel Nahariya and Beitar Jerusalem wasn't played due to misunderstanding between the teams regarding the time of the match, and was left unplayed at the end of the season.)	7	3	11	26	45	17	10th (Note: The club played a relegation/promotion against 11th placed Ahva Notzrit Haifa and the two top placed teams from 1955–56 Liga Bet North and South divisions, Maccabi Hadera and Maccabi Sha'arayim. In the play-offs, which were played as a single round-robin tournament, Beitar Jerusalem finished first, remaining in Liga Alef.)	–	–	–		
1956–57	Alef (2)	22	9	4	9	47	36	23	6th	–	–	–		
1957–58	Alef (2)	20	13	4	3	33	16	30	1st	QF	–	–		
1958–59	Alef (2)	22	10	6	6	40	36	26	4th	R6	R1	–		
1959–60	Alef (2)	26	13	6	7	36	28	32	4th	Round of 16	–	–		
1960–61	Alef (2)	26	8	8	10	27	34	24	6th	Round of 16	–	–		
1961–62	Alef (2)	26	8	10	8	36	33	26	6th		–	–		
1962–63	Alef (2)	30	9	9	12	33	44	27	7th	QF	–	–		
1963–64	Alef South (2)	26	13	6	7	56	34	32	3rd	R2	–	–		
1964–65	Alef South (2)	30	16	5	9	67	37	37	2nd	R5	–	–		
1965–66	Alef South (2)	30	17	6	7	68	31	40	3rd	Round of 16	–	–		
1966–67	Alef South (2)	60	47	10	3	161	36	104	1st	R6	–	–		
1967–68	Alef South (2)	60	47	10	3	161	36	104	1st	R5	–	–		
1968–69	Leumit (1)	30	6	14	10	24	42	26	13th	R6	Group	–		
1969–70	Leumit (1)	30	10	10	10	29	29	30	5th	SF	–	–		
1970–71	Leumit (1)	30	8	10	12	35	36	26	10th	SF	–	–		
1971–72	Leumit (1)	30	16	9	5	36	15	41	2nd	QF	–	–		
1972–73	Leumit (1)	30	8	9	13	21	34	25	14th	Round of 16	Group	–		
1973–74	Leumit (1)	30	12	10	8	27	26	34	3rd	SF	–	–		
1974–75	Leumit (1)	30	9	8	13	23	27	26	15th	Final	–	–		
1975–76	Leumit (1)	34	12	16	6	48	32	40	2nd	Winners	–	–		
1976–77	Leumit (1)	30	12	9	9	35	23	33	3rd	R6	–	–		
1977–78	Leumit (1)	26	12	9	5	32	14	33	3rd	SF	–	–		
1978–79	Leumit (1)	30	14	12	4	50	23	40	2nd	Winners	–	–		
1979–80	Leumit (1)	30	4	15	11	15	25	23	16th	SF	–	–		
1980–81	Artzit (2)	30	19	8	3	51	11	46	2nd	R7	–	–		
1981–82	Leumit (1)	30	9	12	9	37	36	30	6th	SF	–	–		
1982–83	Leumit (1)	30	7	15	8	34	33	36	8th	QF	–	–		
1983–84	Leumit (1)	30	15	11	4	45	27	56	2nd	QF	–	–		
1984–85	Leumit (1)	30	17	9	4	52	27	60	2nd	Winners	Final	–		
1985–86	Leumit (1)	30	15	7	8	48	33	52	4th	Winners	Group	–		
1986–87	Leumit (1)	30	19	9	2	59	27	66	1st	SF	Group	–		
1987–88	Leumit (1)	31	10	9	12	38	42	39	11th		Group	–		
1988–89	Leumit (1)	33	12	6	15	42	44	42	9th	Winners	Group	–		
1989–90	Leumit (1)	32	10	8	14	20	25	38	10th	Round of 16	Group	–		
1990–91	Leumit (1)	32	8	4	20	25	46	28	11th	Round of 16	Group	–		
1991–92	Artzit (2)	30	17	9	4	50	20	60	1st		Group	–		
1992–93	Leumit (1)	33	22	5	6	64	38	71	1st	QF	Group	–		
1993–94	Leumit (1)	39	19	7	13	75	66	64	4th	Round of 16	Final	CL, R1		
1994–95	Leumit (1)	30	12	8	10	42	36	44	6th	SF	Group	–		
1995–96	Leumit (2)	30	19	7	4	65	31	64	3rd	QF	Gold	Intertoto, Group		
1996–97	Leumit (1)	30	21	6	3	62	20	69	1st	SF	Group	UEFA Cup, QR		
1997–98	Leumit (1)	30	20	9	1	71	33	69	1st	QF	Winners	CL, 2QR; UEFA Cup, R1		
1998–99	Leumit (1)	30	17	6	7	67	33	57	4th	Final	Final	UEFA Cup, R1	-	
1999–2000	Premier (1)	39	15	14	10	61	54	59	5th	Final	R2		Viktor Paço	13
2000–01	Premier (1)	38	18	9	11	49	42	62 (Note: Beitar Jerusalem had 1 point deducted.)	5th	R8	Final	UEFA Cup, R1	Alon Mizrahi	13
2001–02	Premier (1)	33	7	12	14	39	49	33	10th	SF	R2	–	Manor Hassan; Itzik Zohar	11
2002–03	Premier (1)	33	10	6	17	46	59	36	9th	R8	Group	–	Andrzej Kubica	12
2003–04	Premier (1)	33	10	9	14	32	42	35	9th	Round of 16	Group	–	Avi Nimni	9
2004–05	Premier (1)	33	13	8	12	46	44	47	4th	R9	QF	–	Lior Asulin	15
2005–06	Premier (1)	33	17	7	9	51	33	58	3rd	Round of 16	Group	Intertoto, R2	Lior Asulin	12
2006–07	Premier (1)	33	19	10	4	52	24	67	1st	R9	SF	UEFA Cup, 2QR	Toto Tamuz	11
2007–08	Premier (1)	33	20	7	6	61	23	67	1st	Winners	SF	CL, 2QR	Rômulo	17
2008–09	Premier (1)	33	16	12	5	49	28	57 (Note: Beitar Jerusalem had two points deducted due to a pitch invasion by it fans in the previous season against Maccabi Herzliya and one point due to racist calls from Beitar fans.)	3rd	Winners	Group	CL, 2QR	Barak Itzhaki	14
2009–10	Premier (1)	35	14	7	14	50	44	26 (Note: Beitar Jerusalem scored 46 points in the regular season, which were halved at the beginning of the play-offs. The club scored 3 more points during the play-offs for a total of 49 points.)	5th	QF	Winners	–	Barak Itzhaki	16
2010–11	Premier (1)	35	12	9	14	38	35	26	11th (Note: Beitar Jerusalem scored 38 points in the regular season, which were halved at the beginning of the play-offs. The club scored 7 more points during the play-offs for a total of 45 points.)	QF	QF	–	Hen Azriel	10
2011–12	Premier (1)	37	15	7	15	32	44	50 (Note: Beitar Jerusalem were deducted two points for racist taunts from the crowd.)	9th	R8	Group	–	Amit Ben Shushan	7
2012–13	Premier (1)	33	9	12	12	44	54	39	10th	QF	Group	–	Avi Reikan	11
2013–14	Premier (1)	33	12	6	15	31	32	42	7th	QF	–	–	Itzik Cohen	7
2014–15	Premier (1)	36	13	13	10	48	43	51 (Note: Beitar Jerusalem had one point deducted.)	4th	R8	Group	–	Itzik Cohen; Lidor Cohen	8
2015–16	Premier (1)	36	18	6	12	46	37	58 (Note: Beitar Jerusalem had two points deducted because of racial slurs by their fans.)	3rd	R8	SF	EL, 2QR	Nikita Rukavytsya	14
2016–17	Premier (1)	36	16	12	8	53	36	60	3rd	SF	Group	EL, Play-off round	Itay Shechter	19
2017–18	Premier (1)	36	20	8	8	75	51	68	3rd	F	QF	EL, 2QR	Gaëtan Varenne	16
2018–19	Premier (1)	33	11	10	12	43	43	43	7th	8R	QF	EL, 1QR	Gaëtan Varenne	8
2019–20	Premier (1)	36	16	11	9	51	35	59	3rd	QF	Winners	–	Shlomi Azulay	9
2020–21	Premier (1)	33	10	10	13	40	43	40	10th	Round of 16	3rd	EL, 1QR	Eliran Atar	9
2021–22	Premier (1)	33	9	10	14	35	43	37	10th	Round of 16	13th	—	Yarden Shua; Richmond Boakye	5
2022–23	Premier (1)	33	13	4	16	52	58	40 (Note: Beitar Jerusalem had three points deducted.)	8th	Winners	10th	—	Ion Nicolaescu	14
2023–24	Premier (1)	33	11	8	14	45	40	36 (Note: Beitar Jerusalem had five points deducted.)	11th	8R	6th	ECL, 2QR	Yarden Shua	9
2024–25	Premier (1)	36	15	9	12	58	54	53 (Note: Beitar Jerusalem had one point deducted following riot in Maccabi Haifa match.)	4th	Final	5th	—	Patrick Twumasi	7

== Key ==
- P = Played
- W = Games won
- D = Games drawn
- L = Games lost
- F = Goals for
- A = Goals against
- Pts = Points
- Pos = Final position
- Leumit = Liga Leumit (National League)
- Artzit = Liga Artzit (Nationwide League)
- Premier = Liga Al (Premier League)
- Pal. League = Palestine League
- F = Final
- Group = Group stage
- QF = Quarter-finals
- QR1 = First Qualifying Round
- QR2 = Second Qualifying Round
- QR3 = Third Qualifying Round
- QR4 = Fourth Qualifying Round
- RInt = Intermediate Round
- R1 = Round 1
- R2 = Round 2
- R3 = Round 3
- R4 = Round 4
- R5 = Round 5
- R6 = Round 6
- SF = Semi-finals

Champions	Runners-up	Promoted	Relegated
