= Baruchyan =

Baruchyan (Hebrew: ברוכיאן) is a Hebrew surname. Notable people with the surname include:

- Aviram Baruchyan (born 1985), Israeli footballer
- Evyatar Baruchyan (born 1989), Israeli footballer
