= Ohad =

Ohad may refer to:

== People ==
=== Surname ===
- Daniella Ohad, American design historian

=== Given name ===
- Ohad (Bible), in the Hebrew Bible, the third son of Simeon
- Ohad Benchetrit, Canadian musician
- Ohad Cohen, goalkeeper for Hapoel Be'er Sheva F.C.
- Ohad Kadousi, striker for Hapoel Petah Tikva
- Ohad Knoller, Israeli actor
- Ohad Levita, goalkeeper for RKC Waalwijk
- Ohad Milstein, Israeli documentary filmmaker
- Ohad Moskowitz, Israeli singer
- Ohad Naharin, Israeli contemporary dancer
- Ohad Saidof, goalkeeper for Beitar Jerusalem

== Places ==
- Ohad, Israel
