= Eli Dasa =

Israeli footballer (born 1992)

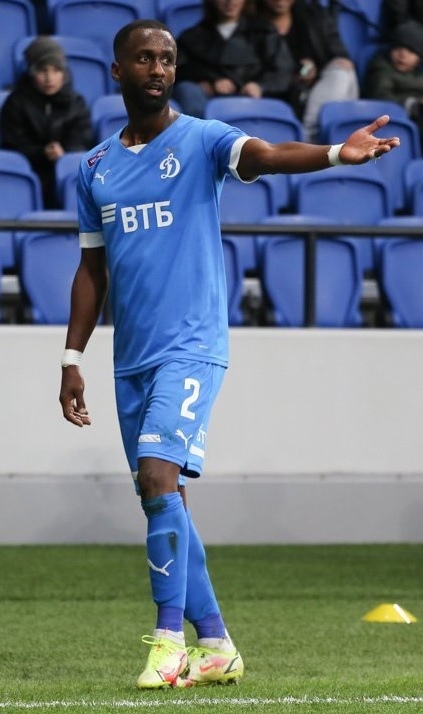
- Dasa playing for Dynamo Moscow in 2022

Personal information
- Full name: Elazar Dasa
- Date of birth: 3 December 1992 (age 33)
- Place of birth: Netanya, Israel
- Height: 1.77 m (5 ft 10 in)
- Position: Right-back

Team information
- Current team: Maccabi Haifa
- Number: 2

Youth career
- 2003–2004: Sektzia Ness Ziona F.C.
- 2004–2007: Maccabi Tel Aviv
- 2007–2010: Beitar Jerusalem

Senior career*
Years	Team	Apps	(Gls)
2010–2015	Beitar Jerusalem	113	(3)
2015–2019	Maccabi Tel Aviv	100	(5)
2019–2022	Vitesse	71	(0)
2022–2025	Dynamo Moscow	62	(0)
2025–2026	NEC	22	(1)
2026–	Maccabi Haifa	0	(0)

International career^{‡}
2008	Israel U16	2	(0)
2008–2009	Israel U17	6	(0)
2010	Israel U18	3	(0)
2010–2012	Israel U19	12	(0)
2011–2014	Israel U21	25	(0)
2015–	Israel	83	(1)
- * Club domestic league appearances and goals as of 21 May 2026 ‡ National team caps and goals as of 21:23, 17 November 2026 (UTC)

Eliezer "Eli" Dasa (Hebrew: אלי דסה; born 3 December 1992) is an Israeli professional footballer who plays as a right-back for Maccabi Haifa and captains the Israel national team. He is the first captain of Israel to be of Ethiopian-Jewish origin.

== Early life ==
Dasa was born in Netanya, Israel, to an Ethiopian-Jewish family. He is the second Israeli of Ethiopian-Jewish background to play for the Israel national football team. His younger brother Or Dasa is also an Israeli international footballer who plays for Israeli club Hapoel Ramat Gan, who also played for the Israel U-21 national team.

== Club career ==
On 31 July 2010, Dasa made his debut in Beitar Jerusalem F.C. during a Toto Cup match against Hapoel Ashkelon. On 12 September 2012, Dasa scored the first goal in his senior career during a league match against Hapoel Be'er Sheva.

On 9 July 2015, he made his first international match debut in a 2–1 victory over Kazakh team FC Ordabasy in the 2015–16 UEFA Europa League qualification and played 90 minutes.

On 10 August 2015, Dasa signed for four years with Israeli champions Maccabi Tel Aviv.

On 7 September 2022, Dasa signed a contract with Russian Premier League club Dynamo Moscow for the term of two years with an option to extend for one more year.

On 10 June 2024, Dynamo announced that the option for the 2024–25 season in Dasa's contract has been activated. Dasa left Dynamo Moscow on 10 June 2025 as his contract expired.

On 22 September 2025, Dasa joined Eredivisie side NEC on a free transfer, signing a one-year contract with an option for an additional year.

On 12 October 2026, Dasa joined Maccabi Haifa on a free transfer, signing a two-year contract with a team option for an additional year.

== International career ==
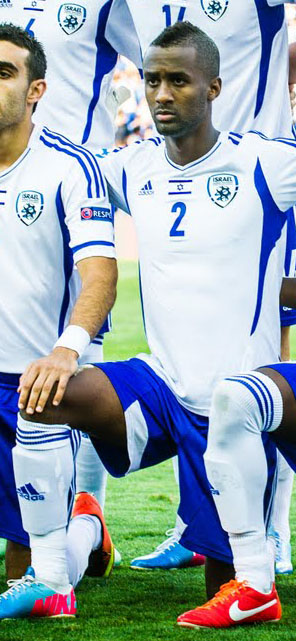
Dasa at the 2013 UEFA Euros U21, that took place in Israel

Dasa played in the Israel under-21 team since 2010. He was a part of the Israeli team for the 2013 UEFA European Under-21 Championship.

In 2015, he was called up by the national coach Eli Guttman for the senior Israel national team. Dasa made his debut in the senior national team against Andorra in a 4–0 win, on 3 September 2015. Dasa debuted as the Israeli line-up captain on 26 March 2022, in a friendly away match against Germany; thus becoming the first senior captain of Israel to be of Ethiopian-Jewish origin.

== Career statistics ==
=== Club ===
As of match played 17 May 2026

Appearances and goals by club, season and competition
Club	Season	League			National cup (Note: Includes Israel State Cup, KNVB Cup, Russian Cup)		League cup (Note: Includes Toto Cup)		Continental		Other		Total	
Club	Season	Division	Apps	Goals	Apps	Goals	Apps	Goals	Apps	Goals	Apps	Goals	Apps	Goals
Beitar Jerusalem	2010–11	Israeli Premier League	18	0	1	0	–		–		–		19	0
Beitar Jerusalem	2011–12	Israeli Premier League	18	0	0	0	–		–		–		18	0
Beitar Jerusalem	2012–13	Israeli Premier League	25	1	1	0	–		–		–		26	1
Beitar Jerusalem	2013–14	Israeli Premier League	20	0	0	0	–		–		–		20	0
Beitar Jerusalem	2014–15	Israeli Premier League	32	0	0	0	–		–		–		32	0
Beitar Jerusalem	2015–16	Israeli Premier League	0	0	0	0	–		2	0	0	0	2	0
Beitar Jerusalem	Total		113	1	2	0	–		2	0	0	0	117	1
Maccabi Tel Aviv	2015–16	Israeli Premier League	28	0	4	0	–		3 (Note: Three appearances in the UEFA Champions League)	0	1 (Note: Appearance in the Israel Super Cup)	0	36	0
Maccabi Tel Aviv	2016–17	Israeli Premier League	31	0	5	0	–		10 (Note: Five appearance in the UEFA Europa League, five appearances in the UEFA Europa League qualifying)	0	–		46	0
Maccabi Tel Aviv	2017–18	Israeli Premier League	17	0	1	0	–		4 (Note: One appearance in the UEFA Europa League, three appearances in the UEFA Europa League qualifying)	0	–		22	0
Maccabi Tel Aviv	2018–19	Israeli Premier League	23	0	3	0	–		8 (Note: Eight appearances in the UEFA Europa League qualifying)	0	–		34	0
Maccabi Tel Aviv	Total		99	0	13	0	–		25	0	1	0	138	0
Vitesse	2019–20	Eredivisie	10	0	1	0	–		0	0	0	0	11	0
Vitesse	2020–21	Eredivisie	30	0	3	0	–		0	0	0	0	33	0
Vitesse	2021–22	Eredivisie	31	0	2	0	–		11	1	0	0	44	1
Vitesse	Total		71	0	6	0	–		11	1	0	0	88	1
Dynamo Moscow	2022–23	Russian Premier League	22	0	8	0	–		–		–		30	0
Dynamo Moscow	2023–24	Russian Premier League	20	0	2	0	–		–		–		22	0
Dynamo Moscow	2024–25	Russian Premier League	20	0	6	1	–		–		–		26	1
Dynamo Moscow	Total		62	0	16	1	–		–		–		78	1
NEC	2025–26	Eredivisie	22	1	4	1	–		–		–		26	2
Career total			367	2	41	2	0	0	38	1	1	0	447	5

=== International ===
As of match played 17 November 2026

Appearances and goals by national team and year
National team	Year	Apps	Goals
Israel	2015	3	0
Israel	2016	3	0
Israel	2017	3	0
Israel	2018	6	0
Israel	2019	10	0
Israel	2020	7	0
Israel	2021	12	0
Israel	2022	8	0
Israel	2023	9	0
Israel	2024	4	0
Israel	2025	10	1
Israel	2026	8	0
Total		83	1

Scores and results list Israel's goal tally first, score column indicates score after each Dasa goal.

List of international goals scored by Eli Dasa
No.	Date	Venue	Opponent	Score	Result	Competition
1	22 March 2025	Nagyerdei Stadion, Debrecen, Hungary	Estonia	2–1	2–1	2026 FIFA World Cup qualification

== Honours ==
Maccabi Tel Aviv

- Israeli Premier League: 2018–19
- Israel Toto Cup (Ligat Ha'Al): 2017–18, 2018–19

Individual

- Eredivisie Team of the Month: April 2022
