= Shai Haddad =

Tunisian-Jewish Israeli footballer (born 1987)

Shai Haddad שי חדד
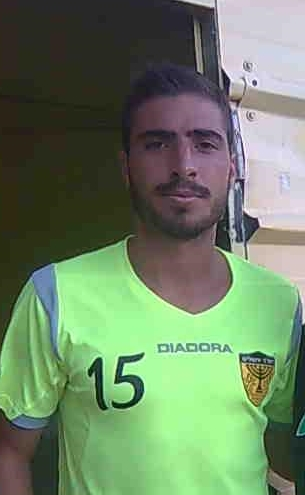
- Haddad with Beitar Jerusalem in 2012

Personal information
- Full name: Shai Haddad
- Date of birth: 2 July 1987 (age 39)
- Place of birth: Ma'ale Adumim, West Bank
- Height: 1.76 m (5 ft 9 in)
- Position: Right back

Team information
- Current team: Hapoel Ashdod

Youth career
- –2007: Beitar Jerusalem

Senior career*
Years	Team	Apps	(Gls)
2007–2014	Beitar Jerusalem	106	(3)
2008–2010	→ Hapoel Ramat Gan (loan)	56	(5)
2014	Petrolul Ploiești	1	(0)
2015	F.C. Ashdod	7	(0)
2015–2017	Hapoel Katamon	55	(6)
2017–2020	Hapoel Ashkelon	71	(3)
2020–2021	Hapoel Ashdod	7	(0)

International career
2007	Israel U21	2	(0)
- * Club domestic league appearances and goals

Shai Haddad (Hebrew: שי חדד; born 2 July 1987 in Ma'ale Adumim) is a Tunisian-Jewish Israeli former footballer. He plays mainly as a right back, but can also be utilized as a midfielder.

== Club career ==
=== Beitar Jerusalem ===
Haddad started his career in Beitar Jerusalem's youth program. On 16 August 2004, he made his senior debut in a Toto Cup match against Hapoel Haifa. In the 2006–07 season, he participated in the youth's team double win.

Haddad signed a senior contract with the club in the 2007–08 season. He made his premier league debut on 30 May 2008, coming on as a substitute in a match against Bnei Sakhnin. In the same season he also played in 3 Toto Cup matches.-

=== Hapoel Ramat Gan ===
Haddad was loaned to Hapoel Ramat Gan from the Liga Leumit for the 2008–09 season to let him play more matches, and he helped the team get promoted to the premier league. He then signed an extra year extension of his loan at Hapoel Ramat Gan. On 22 August 2009, he scored his debut goal in the premier league, equalizing the scores in a match against Maccabi Petah Tikva.

=== Back to Beitar ===
In 2010, Haddad returned to Beitar Jerusalem at the end of his loan contract. On 23 April 2011, he scored his debut goal with Beitar Jerusalem, in a 5–1 victory over Hapoel Ramat Gan.

In the 2012–13 season, he was moved by Eli Cohen from the midfield to a right back position.

At the end of the 2013–14 season, Haddad's contract ended and was not extended.

=== Petrolul Ploiești ===
On 16 October 2014, Haddad signed with Romanian side Petrolul Ploiești where his Israeli national teammate Toto Tamuz has been playing for half a season already. His contract was terminated only 2 months later.

=== Hapoel Ashdod ===
On 31 August 2020, Haddad signed in the Liga Alef club Hapoel AshdodAhvan, Liav (31 August 2020). "פרסום ראשון: שי חדד ועופר ורטה חתמו בהפועל אדומים אשדוד" (in Hebrew). Kan Darom..

== Career statistics ==
As of 1 August 2020

Club	Season	League		Cup		League Cup		Total	
Club	Season	Apps	Goals	Apps	Goals	Apps	Goals	Apps	Goals
Beitar Jerusalem	2004–05	0	0	0	0	1	0	1	0
Beitar Jerusalem	2007–08	1	0	0	0	3	0	4	0
Beitar Jerusalem	2010–11	22	1	2	0	3	0	27	1
Beitar Jerusalem	2011–12	31	0	0	0	0	0	31	0
Beitar Jerusalem	2012–13	26	0	0	0	4	0	30	0
Beitar Jerusalem	2013–14	26	2	2	0	–	–	28	2
Beitar Jerusalem	Total	106	3	4	0	11	0	121	3
Hapoel Ramat Gan (loan)	2008–09	24	1	1	0	3	0	28	1
Hapoel Ramat Gan (loan)	2009–10	32	4	2	0	5	0	39	4
Hapoel Ramat Gan (loan)	Total	56	5	3	0	8	0	67	5
Petrolul Ploiești	2014–15	1	0	1	1	0	0	2	1
Petrolul Ploiești	Total	1	0	1	1	0	0	2	1
F.C. Ashdod	2014–15	7	0	0	0	0	0	7	0
F.C. Ashdod	Total	7	0	0	0	0	0	7	0
Hapoel Katamon	2015–16	33	5	1	0	0	0	34	5
Hapoel Katamon	2016–17	22	1	0	0	0	0	22	1
Hapoel Katamon	Total	55	6	1	0	0	0	56	6
Hapoel Ashkelon	2017–18	23	0	1	0	0	0	24	0
Hapoel Ashkelon	2018–19	28	2	0	0	0	0	28	2
Hapoel Ashkelon	2019–20	20	1	2	0	2	1	24	2
Hapoel Ashkelon	Total	71	3	3	0	2	1	76	4
Hapoel Ashdod	2020–21	0	0	0	0	0	0	0	0
Hapoel Ashdod	Total	7	0	2	0	0	0	9	0
Career total		296	17	15	1	21	1	329	19
