= Ariel Harush =

Israeli footballer

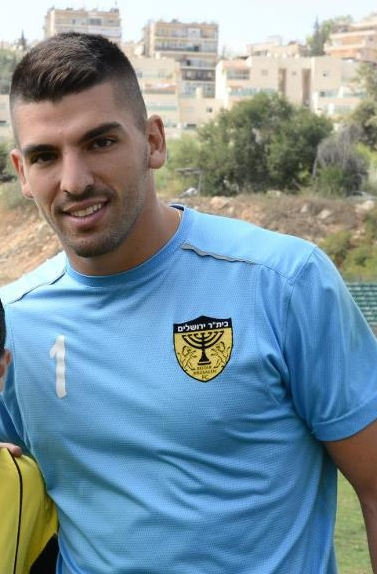
- Harush with Beitar Jerusalem in 2013

Personal information
- Full name: Ariel Harush
- Date of birth: May 25, 1988 (age 38)
- Place of birth: Jerusalem, Israel
- Height: 1.90 m (6 ft 3 in)
- Position: Goalkeeper

Youth career
- 2000–2007: Beitar Jerusalem

Senior career*
Years	Team	Apps	(Gls)
2007–2014	Beitar Jerusalem	170	(0)
2014–2015	Maccabi Netanya	31	(0)
2015–2017	Hapoel Tel Aviv	48	(0)
2017–2018	Anorthosis Famagusta	36	(0)
2018–2020	Hapoel Be'er Sheva	20	(0)
2019–2020	→ Sparta Rotterdam (loan)	16	(0)
2020–2021	→ Nitra (loan)	3	(0)
2021	Heerenveen	0	(0)
2021–2023	Hapoel Be'er Sheva	7	(0)
2023–2025	F.C. Ashdod	48	(0)

International career^{‡}
2009–2010	Israel U21	12	(0)
2010–2021	Israel	20	(0)
- * Club domestic league appearances and goals as of 19 June 2026 ‡ National team caps and goals as of 19 June 2026

Ariel Harush (or Harosh, Hebrew: אריאל הרוש; born 25 May 1988) is an Israeli former footballer who played as a goalkeeper.

Harush's time at Beitar Jerusalem was featured in the 2016 documentary Forever Pure, where he stood against racism and hate from the fans toward two new Muslim Chechnyan players. Harush was ultimately hounded out the club by the right-wing fanbase La Familia and left to play for Maccabi Netanya.

Harush and teammate Tomer Hemed were suspended by the Israeli national team for two games in 2017 after criticising manager Elisha Levy.

Harush retired in April 2026.

== Early life ==
Harush was born in Jerusalem, Israel, to a Sephardic Jewish family.

== Honours ==
Beitar Jerusalem

- State Cup: 2008–09
- Toto Cup: 2009–10

Hapoel Be'er Sheva

- State Cup: 2021–22
- Super Cup: 2022

== See also ==
- List of Jewish footballers
- List of Jews in sports
- List of Israelis
