= Steven Cohen (footballer) =

French-Israeli footballer (born 1986)

Steven Cohen סטיבן כהן
Personal information
- Date of birth: 27 February 1986 (age 40)
- Place of birth: Marseille, France
- Height: 1.84 m (6 ft 0 in)
- Position: Midfielder

Youth career
- Montpellier

Senior career*
Years	Team	Apps	(Gls)
2003–2006	Montpellier B		
2006–2008	Racing de Ferrol	51	(10)
2008–2009	Salamanca	38	(6)
2009–2010	Hapoel Ra'anana	28	(7)
2010–2012	Beitar Jerusalem	51	(5)
2012	Waasland-Beveren	0	(0)
2012–2013	Beitar Jerusalem	18	(1)
2013–2014	Hapoel Ironi Acre	27	(3)
2014–2015	Hapoel Haifa	23	(0)
Total		236	(32)
- * Club domestic league appearances and goals

Steven Cohen (Hebrew: סטיבן כהן; born 27 February 1986) is a French-Israeli former professional association football player who played as a midfielder.

== Early life ==
Cohen was born in Marseille to a French father with Israeli citizenship and Jewish mother.

== Career ==
=== From Montpellier to Ferrol ===
Cohen was brought up through the youth ranks of French club Montpellier. After being released by Montpellier, Cohen landed at Spanish club Racing Club de Ferrol. The second season for Cohen in Spain proved to be his breakout year and he was courted by Deportivo de La Coruña who agreed to terms with Cohen on a four-year contract. Due to budget issues at Deportivo, the deal was canceled and Cohen traveled to Israel to visit family and friends. During this visit, he went on a week-long trial at F.C. Ashdod. When push came to shove, no final offers had been made and Cohen returned to Spain to play for Salamanca.

=== Move to Israel ===
In August 2009, Cohen spurned offers from clubs in Spain and Turkey and signed a two-year deal starting at €80K, with a one-year option, with Israeli club Hapoel Ra'anana. In doing so, Cohen advanced his dream of playing for the Israel national team and became the most expensive signing ever for Hapoel Ra'anana.

Cohen's debut in Israel was on 12 September 2009 in a Premier League match between Hapoel Ra'anana and Maccabi Netanya. In August 2010, Cohen signed for a 1-year contract at Beitar Jerusalem. After two seasons with Beitar, Cohen moved for Waasland-Beveren but after less than a month with the Belgian club he decided to get back to Israel and played another season with Beitar. In the 2013–14 he played for Hapoel Acre. After one season in Acre, Cohen signed a two-year contract with Hapoel Haifa.

== Career statistics ==
Appearances and goals by club, season and competition
Club	Season	League			National cup (Note: Includes Copa del Rey, Israel State Cup.)		League cup (Note: Includes Toto Cup.)		Continental		Total	
Club	Season	Division	Apps	Goals	Apps	Goals	Apps	Goals	Apps	Goals	Apps	Goals
Racing de Ferrol	2006–07	Segunda División	30	9	1	0	–		–		31	9
Racing de Ferrol	2007–08	Segunda División	21	1	0	0	–		–		21	1
Racing de Ferrol	Total		51	10	1	0	0	0	0	0	52	10
Salamanca	2008–09	Segunda División	38	6	1	0	–		–		39	6
Hapoel Ra'anana	2009–10	Israeli Premier League	28	7	0	0	5	0	0	0	33	7
Beitar Jerusalem	2010–11	Israeli Premier League	23	1	3	0	2	1	0	0	28	2
Beitar Jerusalem	2011–12	Israeli Premier League	28	4	1	0	3	2	0	0	32	6
Beitar Jerusalem	Total		51	5	4	0	5	3	0	0	60	8
Waasland-Beveren	2012–13	Belgian Pro League	0	0	0	0	0	0	0	0	0	0
Beitar Jerusalem	2012–13	Israeli Premier League	18	1	3	0	0	0	0	0	21	1
Hapoel Acre	2013–14	Israeli Premier League	27	3	1	0	0	0	0	0	28	3
Career total			213	32	10	0	10	3	0	0	233	35

== Honours ==
Hapoel Ra'anana

- Toto Cup runner-up: 2009–10

== See also ==
- List of select Jewish football (association; soccer) players
