= Udi Hanoun =

Israeli footballer (born 1987)

Udi Hanoun אודי חנון
Personal information
- Full name: Udi Yehuda Hanoun אודי יהודה חנון
- Date of birth: 28 February 1987 (age 39)
- Place of birth: Israel
- Position: Defender

Youth career
- Bnei Yehuda

Senior career*
Years	Team	Apps	(Gls)
2006–2007	Hapoel Jerusalem	9	(0)
2007–2008	Hapoel Nazareth Illit	27	(0)
2008–2009	Hapoel Ramat HaSharon	14	(0)
2009–2010	Hapoel Petah Tikva	11	(1)
2010–2011	Hapoel Ramat HaSharon	8	(0)
2011–2012	Hapoel Herzliya	35	(0)
2012–2013	Beitar Kfar Saba	8	(0)

International career
2003–2004	Israel U17	13	(0)
2005	Israel U18	5	(0)
2005–2006	Israel U19	17	(0)
- * Club domestic league appearances and goals

Udi Hanoun
Medal record

Representing Israel

Football

Maccabiah Games
Gold medal – first place	2005 Maccabiah	Football

Udi Hanoun (Hebrew: אודי חנון; born 28 February 1987) is a former Israeli professional football (soccer) player. During his career he played for Ironi Nir Ramat HaSharon, Hapoel Petah Tikva, Hapoel Nazareth Illit, Hapoel Jerusalem, Hapoel Herzliya and Beitar Kfar Saba. At international level, Hanoun was capped at levels from under-17 to under-19.
