= Kobi Moyal =

Israeli footballer

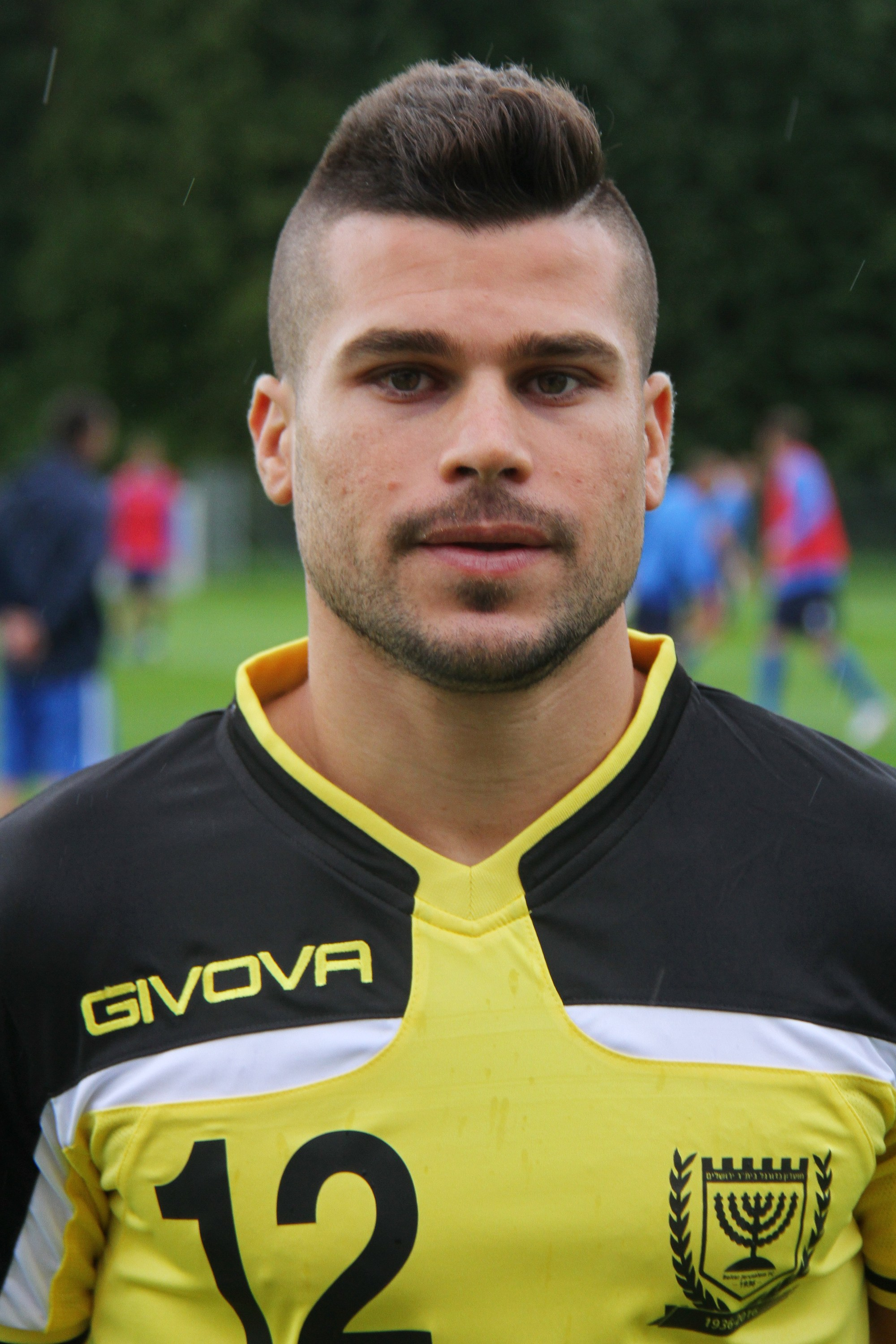
- Moyal with Beitar Jerusalem in 2016

Personal information
- Date of birth: 12 June 1987 (age 39)
- Place of birth: Ma'ale Adumim, West Bank
- Height: 1.70 m (5 ft 7 in)
- Position: Defensive midfielder

Youth career
- 2000–2006: Beitar Jerusalem

Senior career*
Years	Team	Apps	(Gls)
2006–2013	Beitar Jerusalem	158	(6)
2007–2008	→ Hapoel Kfar Saba (loan)	23	(0)
2008–2009	→ Bnei Yehuda (loan)	36	(3)
2013–2014	Sheriff Tiraspol	26	(1)
2014–2016	Maccabi Haifa	18	(0)
2016–2017	Beitar Jerusalem	22	(0)
2017–2018	New York Cosmos	14	(1)
2018–2019	Hapoel Katamon	19	(1)
2020	Holon Yermiyahu		

International career
2013	Israel	1	(0)
- * Club domestic league appearances and goals as of 1 January 2020

Kobi Moyal (Hebrew: קובי מויאל; born 12 June 1987) is an Israeli footballer.

He played for Beitar Jerusalem, Hapoel Kfar Saba, Bnei Yehuda, Sheriff Tiraspol, Maccabi Haifa and American club New York Cosmos.

== Career ==
Moyal played in the youth system of Beitar Jerusalem until 2006. Moyal joined the senior team at 2006–07 season, and won the championship, while concurrently with the youth team won the double.

Moyal was loaned to Hapoel Kfar Saba at 2007–08 season and on 2008–09 season to Bnei Yehuda Tel Aviv. On 2009–10 Israeli Premier League season returned to Beitar Jerusalem.

On 12 August 2013 signed Moyal one year with an option for another year in Sheriff Tiraspol. Moyal played one season, won the championship and was chosen to the Midfielder of the year in Moldova.

On 15 May 2014 he got his first call-up to the Israel national football team towards the games against Mexico and Honduras.

On 21 July 2014, Moyal signed for two years in Maccabi Haifa.

On 16 June 2016, Moyal came back to Beitar Jerusalem for one year. On 12 June 2017, after 13 league games in Beitar, Moyal was released from the team.

He later signed for the New York Cosmos.

== Honours ==
=== Club ===
Beitar Jerusalem

- Israeli Championships (1): 2006–07
- Toto Cup (1): 2009–10

Sheriff Tiraspol

- Divizia Naţională (1): 2013–14
- Super cup Moldova

Maccabi Haifa

- Israel State Cup (1): 2015–16
