= Liron Diamant =

Israeli footballer

Liron Diamant לירון דיאמנט
Personal information
- Full name: Liron Diamant
- Date of birth: 4 April 1990 (age 36)
- Place of birth: Ramat Gan, Israel
- Height: 1.78 m (5 ft 10 in)
- Position: Forward

Youth career
- Maccabi Tel Aviv

Senior career*
Years	Team	Apps	(Gls)
2007–2008	Maccabi Tel Aviv	1	(0)
2008–2009	Maccabi Petah Tikva	0	(0)
2009–2010	Hakoah Amidar Ramat Gan	31	(12)
2010–2011	Hapoel Ramat Gan Givatayim	31	(1)
2011–2012	Beitar Jerusalem	28	(3)
2012–2013	Maccabi Herzliya	19	(7)
2013–2016	Hapoel Ramat Gan Givatayim	115	(30)

International career
2006	Israel U17	3	(1)
2007–2008	Israel U18	4	(0)
2008	Israel U19	3	(0)
2010–2011	Israel U21	4	(0)
- * Club domestic league appearances and goals

Liron Diamant (Hebrew: לירון דיאמנט; born 4 April 1990) is a former Israeli footballer.
