= Barak Moshe =

Israeli footballer

Barak Moshe ברק משה
Personal information
- Full name: Barak Moshe
- Date of birth: 19 March 1991 (age 35)
- Place of birth: Jerusalem, Israel
- Height: 1.77 m (5 ft 9 1/2 in)
- Position: Midfielder

Youth career
- 1998–2008: Beitar Jerusalem

College career
Years	Team	Apps	(Gls)
2015–2019	Loyola Marymount University		

Senior career*
Years	Team	Apps	(Gls)
2008–2014	Beitar Jerusalem	120	(4)
2014–2015	Hapoel Jerusalem	13	(0)

International career
2006-2007	Israel U17	11	(4)
2007-2008	Israel U18	16	(5)
2008-2009	Israel U19	16	(4)
- * Club domestic league appearances and goals as of 15 May 2015

Barak Moshe
Medal record

Representing Israel

Football

Maccabiah Games
Bronze medal – third place	2009 Maccabiah	Football

Barak Moshe (Hebrew: ברק משה; born 19 March 1991) is an Israeli footballer.

== Career ==
In 2009, Moshe represented Israel at the 2009 Maccabiah Games, winning a bronze medal.

Barak Moshe was selected to be the captain of the national team from U16 all the way to U19. Barak won the MVP trophy of the winter tournament for national teams U19, which pathed his way to his first professional contract with Beitar Jerusalem that signed him for five years. Soon after, Barak had his debut when he was only 17 years old. On this year, his team won the Israeli Cup winning FC Maccabi Haifa 2-1 but Barak was unfortunate to get injured just a few days before the match. In 2015 Barak retired from soccer.

== Honors ==
- Captain of the Israeli Soccer National Team U16, U17, U18, U19, U20

- Professional Soccer Career Beitar Jerusalem FC 2008 - 2014

- Israeli State Cup Runner up 2008 U19 2009/2010

- MVP of International Winter Tournament U19 2009

- Bronze medal representing Israel in Maccabiah Games 2009

- Israeli Toto Cup Winner "Ligat AL" 2009/2010
