= 2011–12 Toto Cup Al =

Tournament details
- Country: Israel
- Teams: 16

Final positions
- Champions: Ironi Kiryat Shmona (2nd title)
- Runners-up: Hapoel Tel Aviv F.C.

Tournament statistics
- Matches played: 31
- Goals scored: 84 (2.71 per match)
- Top goal scorer: (Israel) Mahran Lala (5)

The 2011–12 Toto Cup Al was the thirtieth season of the third most important football tournament in Israel since its introduction and the first under the current format. It was held in two stages. First, sixteen Premier League teams were divided into four groups. The winners and runners-up, were advanced to the Quarterfinals. Quarterfinals, Semifinals and Finals were held as one-legged matches, with the Final played at HaMoshava Stadium in Petah Tikva.

It began on 30 July 2011 and ended on 24 January 2012. Ironi Kiryat Shmona were the defending champions, who made it their first Toto Cup Al title overall.

On 24 January 2012, Ironi Kiryat Shmona defended the cup after beating Hapoel Tel Aviv in the finals.

== Group stage ==
The draw took place on 6 June 2011.

The matches were played from 30 July to 16 August 2011.

=== Group A ===
Pos	Team	Pld	W	D	L	GF	GA	GD	Pts	IKS	BnS	MHA	HHA
1	Ironi Kiryat Shmona (A)	3	2	0	1	4	4	0	6			2–1	2–1
2	Bnei Sakhnin (A)	3	1	1	1	3	1	+2	4	2–0			1–1
3	Maccabi Haifa	3	1	1	1	3	3	0	4		1–0		
4	Hapoel Haifa	3	0	2	1	3	4	−1	2			1–1	

Source: football.org.il (in Hebrew)
Rules for classification: 1st points; 2nd goal difference; 3rd matches won; 4th goals scored; 5th head-to-head; 6th decision match
(A) Advanced to the quarterfinals

=== Group B ===
Pos	Team	Pld	W	D	L	GF	GA	GD	Pts	MPT	IRH	HPT	MNE
1	Maccabi Petah Tikva (A)	3	2	1	0	6	4	+2	7			1–0	
2	Ironi Nir Ramat HaSharon (A)	3	1	2	0	4	3	+1	5	2–2			1–0
3	Hapoel Petah Tikva	3	0	2	1	3	4	−1	2		1–1		
4	Maccabi Netanya	3	0	1	2	4	6	−2	1	2–3		2–2	

Source: football.org.il (in Hebrew)
Rules for classification: 1st points; 2nd goal difference; 3rd matches won; 4th goals scored; 5th head-to-head; 6th decision match
(A) Advanced to the quarterfinals

=== Group C ===
Pos	Team	Pld	W	D	L	GF	GA	GD	Pts	MTA	HTA	BnY	HAC
1	Maccabi Tel Aviv (A)	3	2	1	0	4	2	+2	7				2–1
2	Hapoel Tel Aviv (A)	3	1	2	0	6	4	+2	5	2–2		2–2	
3	Bnei Yehuda	3	1	1	1	6	4	+2	4	0–2			
4	Hapoel Acre	3	0	0	3	1	8	−7	0		0–2	0–4	

Source: football.org.il (in Hebrew)
Rules for classification: 1st points; 2nd goal difference; 3rd matches won; 4th goals scored; 5th head-to-head; 6th decision match
(A) Advanced to the quarterfinals

=== Group D ===
Pos	Team	Pld	W	D	L	GF	GA	GD	Pts	ASH	HBS	BEI	HRL
1	F.C. Ironi Ashdod (A)	3	1	2	0	5	4	+1	5		1–1	2–2	
2	Hapoel Be'er Sheva (A)	3	1	1	1	5	3	+2	4			3–0	
3	Beitar Jerusalem	3	1	1	1	3	5	−2	4				1–0
4	Hapoel Rishon LeZion	3	1	0	2	3	4	−1	3	1–2	2–1		

Source: football.org.il (in Hebrew)
Rules for classification: 1st points; 2nd goal difference; 3rd matches won; 4th goals scored; 5th head-to-head; 6th decision match
(A) Advanced to the quarterfinals

== Elimination rounds ==
=== Quarterfinals ===
The draw took place on 9 October 2011.

The matches were played on 26 October 2011.

Team 1	Score	Team 2
Ironi Ramat HaSharon	3–3 (3–5 p)	Hapoel Tel Aviv
Maccabi Petah Tikva	1–1 (4–2 p)	Maccabi Tel Aviv
Bnei Sakhnin	0–1	Hapoel Be'er Sheva
F.C. Ashdod	0–3	Ironi Kiryat Shmona

=== Semifinals ===
The draw took place on 27 October 2011.

The matches were played on 10 January 2012.

Team 1	Score	Team 2
Hapoel Tel Aviv	3–1	Maccabi Petah Tikva
Hapoel Be'er Sheva	1–2 (a.e.t.)	Ironi Kiryat Shmona

=== Final ===
24 January 2012
19:45 IST

Ironi Kiryat Shmona	1 – 1 (a.e.t.)	Hapoel Tel Aviv
Marisat 93'	Report	98' Abbas
Penalties
Hasarma (penalty scored); Elisha (penalty scored); Matović (penalty missed); Gabai (penalty scored); Tzedek (penalty scored)	4 – 3	(penalty missed) Gordana; (penalty scored) Tuama; (penalty scored) Abbas; (penalty scored) Abutbul; (penalty missed) Tamuz

HaMoshava Stadium, Petah Tikva
Referee: Liran Vaksberger

== See also ==
- 2011–12 Toto Cup Leumit
- 2011–12 Israeli Premier League
- 2011–12 Israel State Cup
