= Avi Rikan =

Israeli association football player

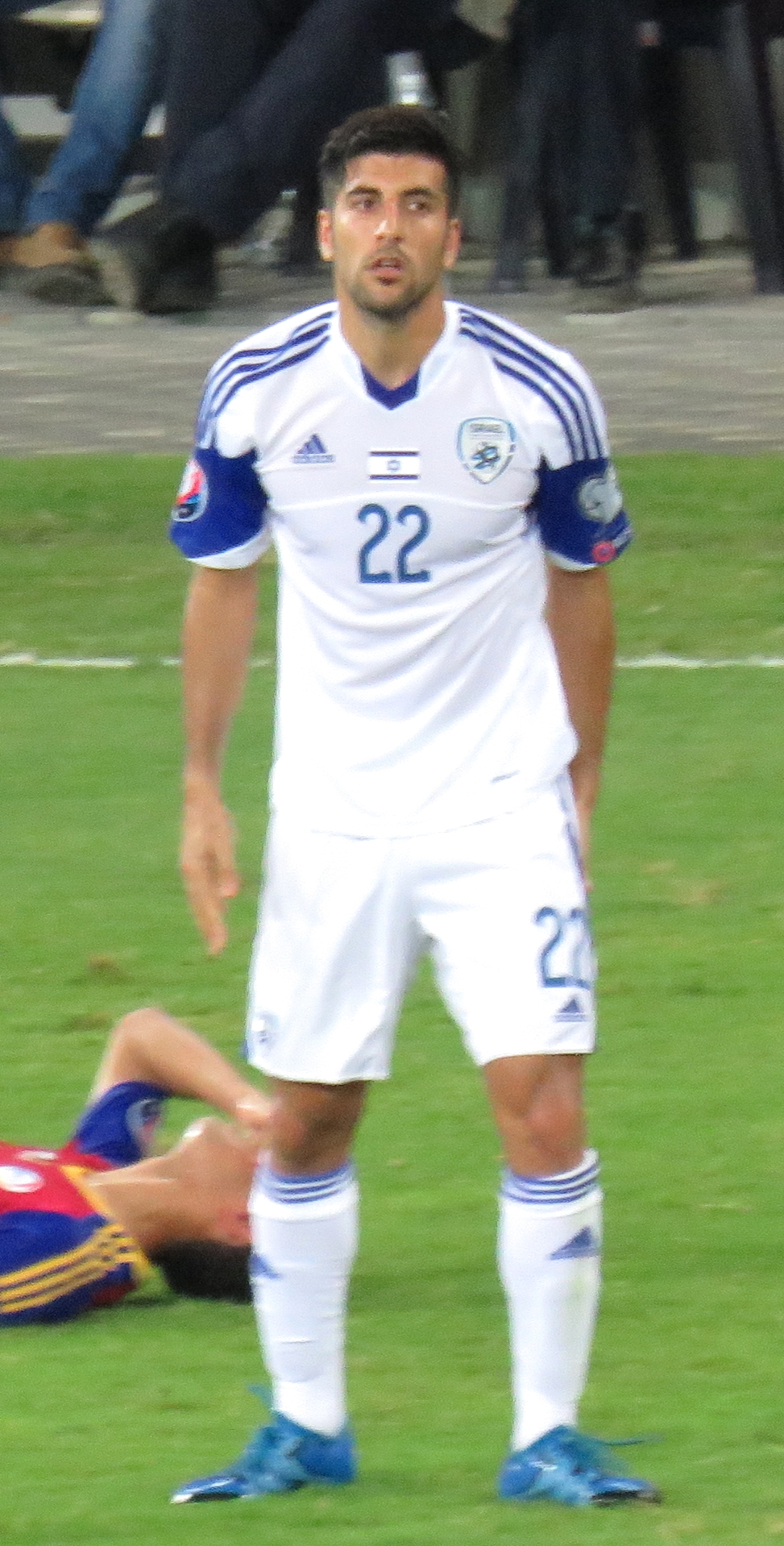
- Rikan playing for Israel in 2015

Personal information
- Full name: Avraham Rikan
- Date of birth: September 10, 1988 (age 38)
- Place of birth: Ma'ale Adumim, Israel
- Height: 1.71 m (5 ft 7 in)
- Positions: Defender; midfielder

Youth career
- 2000–2006: Beitar Jerusalem

Senior career*
Years	Team	Apps	(Gls)
2006–2013	Beitar Jerusalem	121	(15)
2007–2008	→ Maccabi Herzliya (loan)	8	(2)
2008–2009	→ Hapoel Petah Tikva (loan)	30	(1)
2013–2015	FC Zürich	50	(10)
2015–2023	Maccabi Tel Aviv	197	(31)
2023–2024	Hapoel Petah Tikva	22	(3)

International career
2004–2005	Israel U17	13	(2)
2006	Israel U18	3	(0)
2006–2007	Israel U19	16	(5)
2007–2010	Israel U21	14	(0)
2012–2015	Israel	5	(0)
- * Club domestic league appearances and goals as of 15 April 2024

Avraham "Avi" Rikan (Hebrew: אבי ריקן; born September 10, 1988) is an Israeli professional footballer who plays as a defender or midfielder.

His previous clubs include Maccabi Herzliya, Beitar Jerusalem, FC Zürich, Maccabi Tel Aviv and Hapoel Petah Tikva. At international level, Rikan was capped at levels from under-17 to senior team.

== Early life ==
Rikan was born in the Israeli settlement Ma'ale Adumim in the West Bank, to a Sephardic Jewish family.

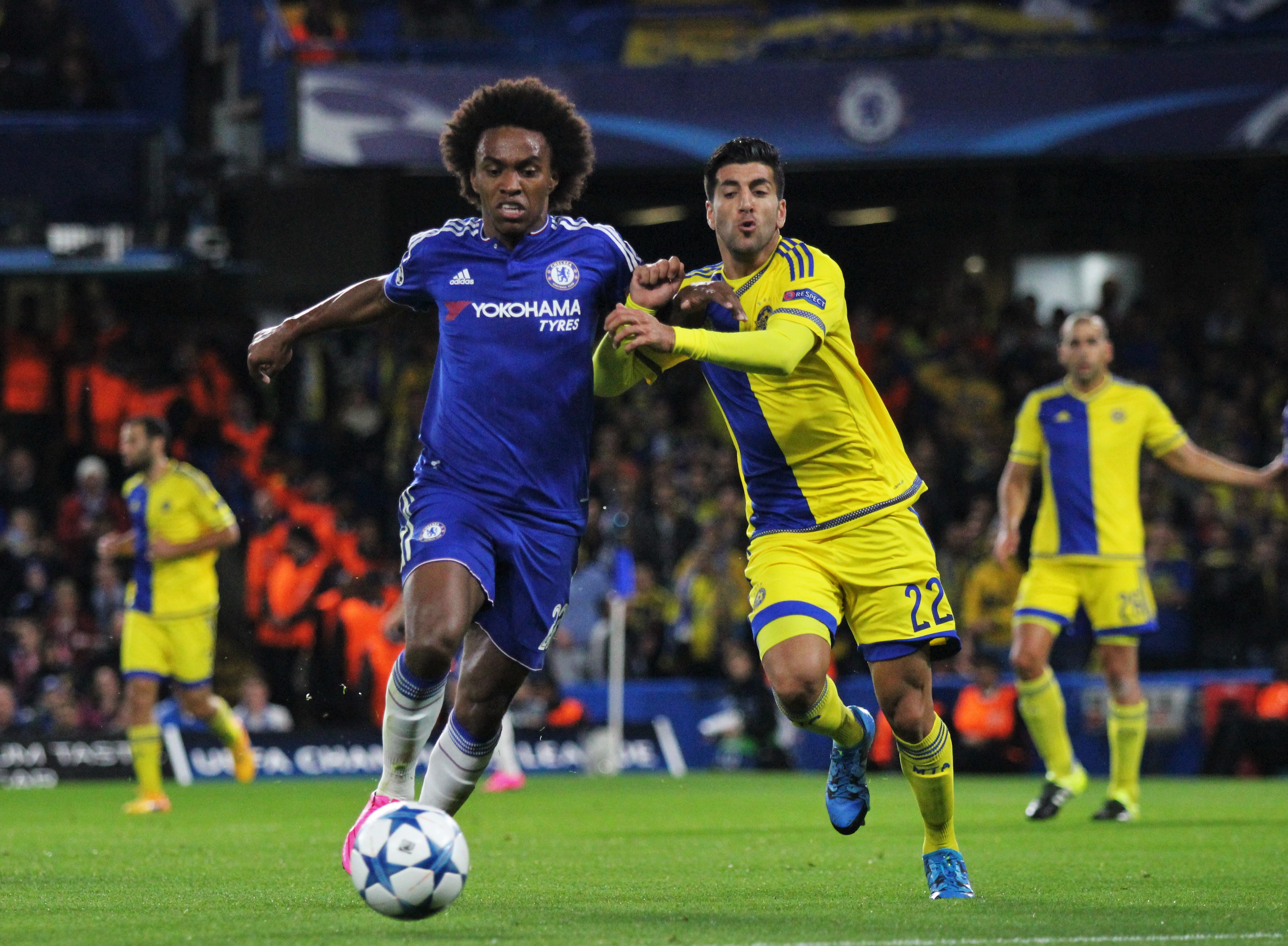
Rikan against Willian in UEFA Champions League 2015

== Honours ==
Beitar Jerusalem

- Toto Cup: 2009–10

FC Zürich

- Swiss Cup: 2013–14

Maccabi Tel Aviv

- Israeli Premier League (2): 2018–19, 2019-20
- Toto Cup (3): 2017–18, 2018–19, 2020-21
- Israel Super Cup (2): 2019, 2020

== See also ==
- List of Jewish footballers
- List of Jews in sports
- List of Israelis
