= Tzahi Elihen =

Israeli footballer

Tzahi Elihen צחי אליחן
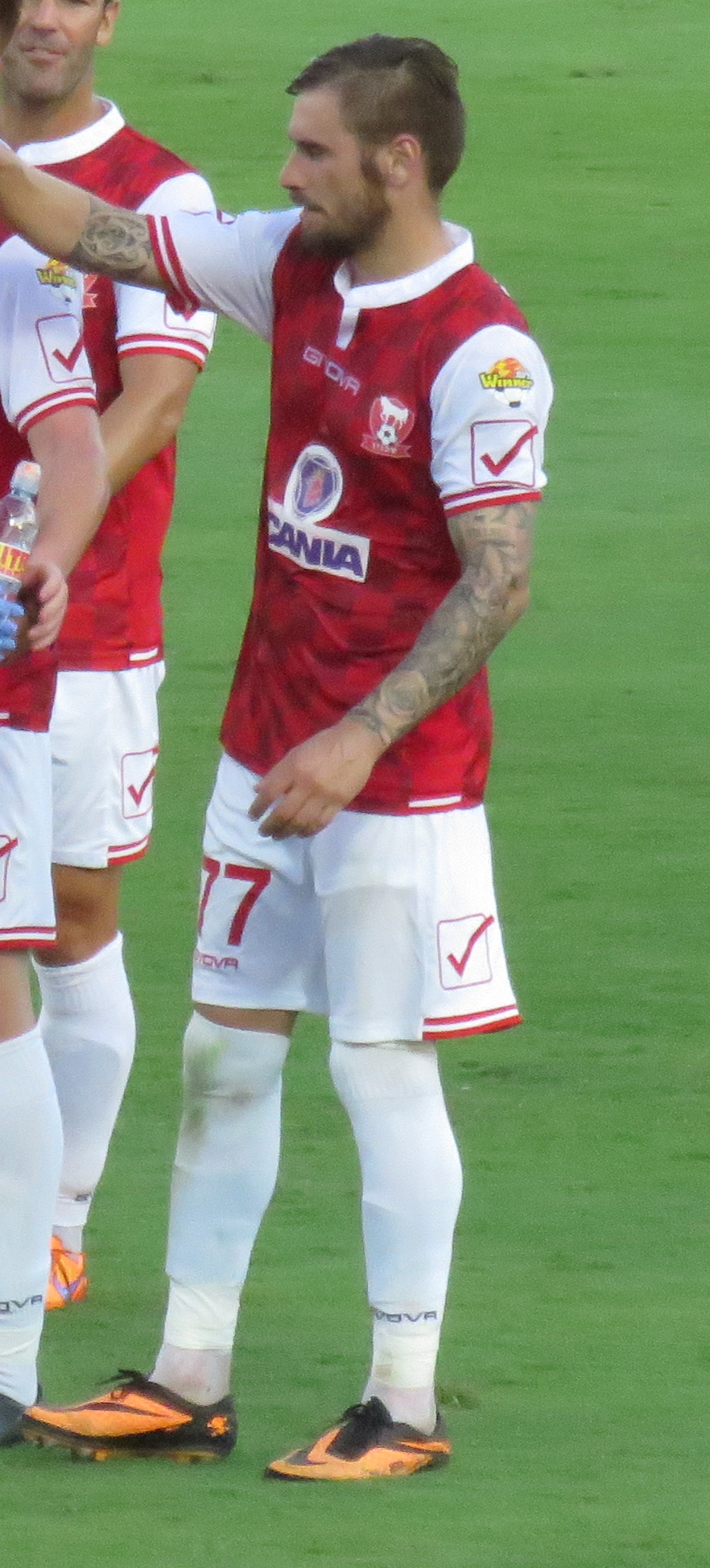
- Elihen playing for Bnei Sakhnin in 2015

Personal information
- Full name: Tzahi Elihen צחי אליחן
- Date of birth: 3 April 1991 (age 35)
- Place of birth: Stockholm, Sweden
- Position: Midfielder

Youth career
- Beitar Jerusalem

Senior career*
Years	Team	Apps	(Gls)
2010–2014	Beitar Jerusalem	36	(3)
2014–2015	Hakoah Amidar Ramat Gan	24	(3)
2015–2016	Bnei Sakhnin	18	(1)
2016	Hapoel Ramat Gan	8	(0)
2016–2017	Hapoel Migdal HaEmek	23	(6)
2017–2018	F.C. Daburiyya	2	(0)
2018	Hapoel Beit She'an	0	(0)

International career
2008–2009	Israel U18	3	(0)
2009	Israel U19	8	(0)
- * Club domestic league appearances and goals

Tzahi Elihen
Medal record

Representing Israel

Football

Maccabiah Games
Bronze medal – third place	2009 Maccabiah	Football

Tzahi Elihen (Hebrew: צחי אליחן; born 3 April 1991) is an Israeli former professional association football player who played as Midfielder.

== Biography ==
Elihen was born in Stockholm, Sweden, to an Israeli father and a Swedish mother who converted to Judaism. His mother committed suicide after suffering from postpartum depression, and when he was five, he moved to Israel with his family. At first, the family lived in Haifa before settling in Ramat Yishai.

=== Playing career ===
Elihen made his professional debut, coming on as a substitute for Eytan Tibi, in a 3–2 loss to Hapoel Haifa on 20 February 2010. In March 2010 he scored his first goal for the team.

==== International career ====
In 2009, Elihen represented Israel at the 2009 Maccabiah Games, winning a bronze medal.

== Statistics ==
As to 31 July 2014

Club performance			League		Cup		League Cup		Continental		Total	
Season	Club	League	Apps	Goals	Apps	Goals	Apps	Goals	Apps	Goals	Apps	Goals
Israel			League		Israel State Cup		Toto Cup		Europe		Total	
2009–10	Beitar Jerusalem	Israeli Premier League	6	1	0	0	0	0	0	0	6	1
2010–11	Beitar Jerusalem	Israeli Premier League	0	0	0	0	3	0	0	0	3	0
2011–12	Beitar Jerusalem	Israeli Premier League	10	0	0	0	3	0	0	0	13	0
2012–13	Beitar Jerusalem	Israeli Premier League	9	0	1	0	3	2	0	0	13	2
2013–14	Beitar Jerusalem	Israeli Premier League	11	1	0	0	0	0	0	0	11	1
Total			36	2	1	0	9	2	0	0	46	4
2014–15	Hakoah Amidar Ramat Gan	Liga Leumit	24	3	1	0	0	0	0	0	25	3
Total			24	3	1	0	0	0	0	0	25	3
2015–16	Bnei Sakhnin	Israeli Premier League	18	1	1	0	2	1	0	0	21	2
Total			18	1	1	0	2	1	0	0	21	2
Career total			60	5	2	0	9	2	0	0	71	7
