= Hen Azriel =

Israeli footballer

Hen Hazriel חן עזריאל
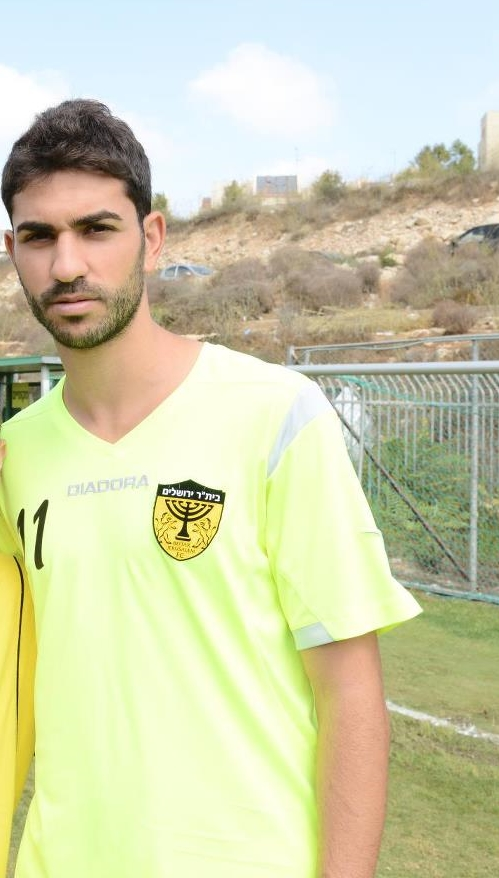
- Azriel with Beitar Jerusalem in 2013

Personal information
- Full name: Hen Azriel
- Date of birth: 26 June 1988 (age 38)
- Place of birth: Jerusalem, Israel
- Height: 1.85 m (6 ft 1 in)
- Position: Striker

Youth career
- 2005–2007: Beitar Jerusalem

Senior career*
| Years | Team | Apps | (Gls) |
| 2006–2011 | Beitar Jerusalem | 71 | (13) |
| 2008–2009 | → Hapoel Petah Tikva (loan) | 9 | (0) |
| 2011–2014 | Maccabi Haifa | 12 | (1) |
| 2012–2013 | → Beitar Jerusalem (loan) | 28 | (8) |
| 2014 | → Bnei Yehuda Tel Aviv (loan) | 10 | (0) |
| 2015–2019 | F.C. Ashdod | 56 | (8) |

International career
| 2007–2010 | Israel U21 | 7 | (1) |
- * Club domestic league appearances and goals

Hen Azriel (Hebrew: חן עזריאל; born 26 June 1988) is a former Israeli footballer who plays as a striker.
