= Ohad Kadousi =

Israeli footballer

Ohad Kadousi אוהד קדוסי
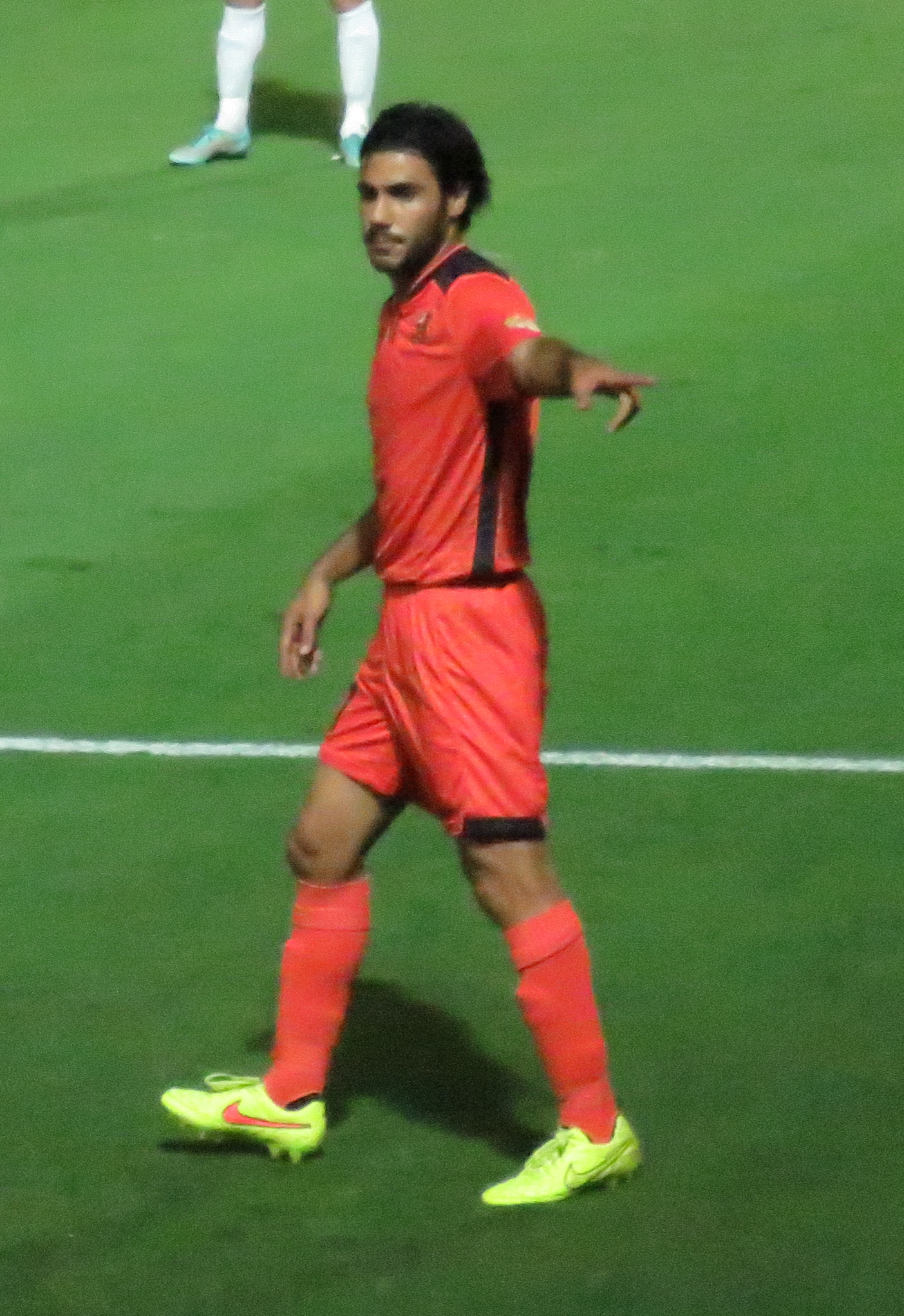
- Kadousi playing for Bnei Yehuda in 2015

Personal information
- Full name: Ohad Kadousi אוהד קדוסי
- Date of birth: 24 September 1985 (age 41)
- Place of birth: Petah Tikva, Israel
- Height: 1.80 m (5 ft 11 in)
- Position: Striker

Youth career
- 1993–2004: Maccabi Petah Tikva

Senior career*
Years	Team	Apps	(Gls)
2004–2005	Maccabi Petah Tikva	9	(0)
2005–2006	Maccabi Herzliya	22	(4)
2006–2007	Bnei Sakhnin	33	(22)
2007–2008	Maccabi Petah Tikva	29	(5)
2008–2010	Hapoel Be'er Sheva	60	(23)
2010–2011	Hapoel Petah Tikva	22	(4)
2011–2012	Bnei Sakhnin	36	(10)
2012–2013	Hapoel Acre	32	(14)
2013	Lausanne-Sport	14	(0)
2014–2016	Bnei Yehuda Tel Aviv	53	(14)
2016–2017	Hapoel Rishon LeZion	29	(12)
2017–2018	Hapoel Hadera	3	(0)
2018–2019	Hapoel Baqa al-Gharbiyye	31	(27)
2019–2020	Hapoel Kfar Shalem	21	(19)
2020–2021	Hapoel Ashdod	12	(4)
2021–2022	Hapoel Kfar Shalem	29	(20)
- * Club domestic league appearances and goals

Ohad Kadousi (Hebrew: אוהד קדוסי) is a former Israeli professional footballer who plays for Hapoel Kfar Shalem.

== Career ==
Kadousi began his career with Maccabi Petah Tikva F.C. where he played from age 8. In the 2004–05 season he got the chance to play with the senior team. After half a year, he signed with Maccabi Herzliya F.C. where he played in Liga Leumit. One year later he aroused the interest of Bnei Sakhnin F.C., which also played in the second tier of Israeli football. There he became the top scorer of the league with 22 goals. In this season he also led the team to the quarter-finals of the State Cup. After 2 years in Ligat Leumit he decided to go back to his home club Maccabi Petah Tikva. In the 2007–08 season he made 29 league appearances, but only made 18 starts. That season he disappointed, having scored only five goals. His team avoided relegation to the second division by only scoring more goals than Hapoel Kfar Saba F.C. On 25 June 2008, he signed a five-year contract with Ligat Leumit club Hapoel Be'er Sheva F.C.

In the summer of 2013 Kadousi joined FC Lausanne-Sport, his first club abroad, and will compete in the Swiss Super League after signing a two-year contract with the option for a third year if the club chooses.

In 2018 Kadousi joined Hapoel Ironi Baqa al-Gharbiyye F.C. in Liga Alef coming from Hapoel Hadera F.C.

On 26 June 2019 signed to Hapoel Kfar Shalem.
