= Aviram Baruchyan =

Israeli footballer

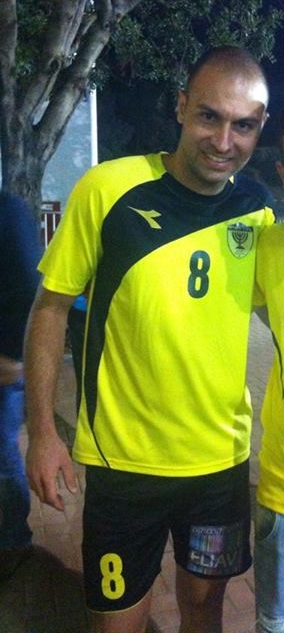
- Baruchyan with Beitar Jerusalem in 2014

Personal information
- Date of birth: 20 March 1985 (age 41)
- Place of birth: Jerusalem, Israel
- Height: 1.76 m (5 ft 9 1/2 in)
- Position: Midfielder

Youth career
- Beitar Jerusalem

Senior career*
Years	Team	Apps	(Gls)
2002–2012	Beitar Jerusalem	237	(37)
2012	Polonia Warsaw	6	(0)
2012–2013	Hapoel Be'er Sheva	26	(1)
2013–2014	Beitar Jerusalem	21	(4)
2014–2018	Hapoel Katamon	92	(23)
2018	Hapoel Rishon LeZion	14	(1)
2018–2019	Hapoel Ashdod	24	(8)
2019–2021	Nordia Jerusalem	10	(1)

International career
2001	Israel U17	4	(0)
2003–2004	Israel U19	14	(2)
2004–2007	Israel U21	16	(1)
2007–2009	Israel	10	(2)
- * Club domestic league appearances and goals

Aviram Baruchyan (Hebrew: אבירם ברוכיאן; born 20 March 1985) is an Israeli former professional football player who played as a midfielder.

== Career ==
Baruchyan came up through the ranks of Beitar Jerusalem's youth system. In the 2002–03 season, he was promoted to the senior team.

Throughout most of his career, he wore the jersey number 8, same as his uncle, a former Beitar player Uri Malmilian.

He made his debut for the Israel national team against Croatia on 13 October 2007.

On 3 January 2012, Baruchyan signed a two-and-a-half-year contract with Polish team Polonia Warsaw.

On 20 September 2012, Baruchyan signed with Israel team Hapoel Be'er Sheva.

On 9 October 2013, Baruchyan rejoined Beitar.

On 23 October 2014, he moved to Hapoel Katamon Jerusalem. On 25 May 2018, Baruchyan left the club.

On 17 June 2018, Baruchyan signed with Hapoel Rishon LeZion.

== Personal life ==
On 27 October 2009, Baruchyan married his girlfriend Rikki in a traditional Jewish ceremony in Jerusalem. Evyatar Baruchyan is his brother.

== Honours ==
Beitar Jerusalem

- Israeli Premier League: 2006–07, 2007–08
- Israel State Cup: 2007–08, 2008–09
- Toto Cup Al: 2009–10

Hapoel Katamon

- Liga Alef: 2014-15
