= Menashe Masiah =

Israeli football referee

Menashe Masiah (Hebrew: מנשה משיח; born 2 November 1973 in Tel Aviv) is an Israeli football referee.

Masiah became a FIFA referee in 2009. He refereed in the 2012–13 UEFA Europa League and qualifying matches for Euro 2012.

== See also ==
- List of Jews in sports (non-players)
