= Evyatar Baruchyan =

Israeli footballer

Evyatar Baruchyan אביתר ברוכיאן
Personal information
- Full name: Evyatar Baruchyan
- Date of birth: August 24, 1989 (age 37)
- Place of birth: Jerusalem
- Positions: Midfielder; left back

Team information
- Current team: Beitar Nordia Jerusalem
- Number: 8

Youth career
- 1998–2009: Beitar jerusalem

Senior career*
Years	Team	Apps	(Gls)
2009–2013	Beitar Jerusalem	23	(1)
2014	Hapoel Katamon Jerusalem	2	(0)
2014–2018	Beitar Nordia Jerusalem	98	(39)
2018	Ironi Modi'in	14	(1)
2018–2020	Beitar Nordia Jerusalem	30	(3)
- * Club domestic league appearances and goals

Evyatar Baruchyan (Hebrew: אביתר ברוכיאן; born 24 August 1989) is an Israeli footballer. His brother Aviram Baruchyan played for Beitar Nordia Jerusalem with him, and today Aviram plays for Hapoel Katamon.
