= Ohad Saidof =

Israeli footballer

Ohad Saidof אוהד סיידוף
Personal information
- Date of birth: 1 October 1987 (age 39)
- Place of birth: Jerusalem
- Position: Goalkeeper

Team information
- Current team: Nordia Jerusalem
- Number: 1

Youth career
- 1996–2006: Beitar Jerusalem

Senior career*
Years	Team	Apps	(Gls)
2005–2014	Beitar Jerusalem	10	(0)
2006–2008	→ Ironi Ramat HaSharon (loan)	1	(0)
2014–2017	Hapoel Katamon	103	(0)
2017	Hapoel Hadera	6	(0)
2017–2018	Nordia Jerusalem	11	(0)
- * Club domestic league appearances and goals as of 20 December 2017

Ohad Saidof (Hebrew: אוהד סיידוף; born 1 October 1987) is a former Israeli footballer. He made his debut in the Liga Leumit while on loan to Ramat HaSharon.

On July 23, 2014, signed to Hapoel Katamon Jerusalem.
