= Amit Ben Shushan =

Israeli footballer

Amit Ben Shushan עמית בן שושן
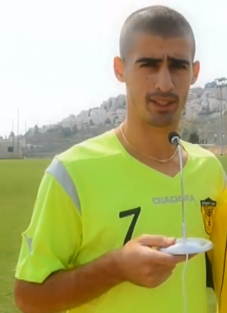
- Ben Shushan with Beitar Jerusalem in 2013

Personal information
- Full name: Amit Ben Shushan
- Date of birth: May 23, 1985 (age 41)
- Place of birth: Jerusalem, Israel
- Height: 1.77 m (5 ft 10 in)
- Positions: Striker; winger

Youth career
- 2000–04: Beitar Jerusalem

Senior career*
Years	Team	Apps	(Gls)
2004–2013	Beitar Jerusalem	237	(41)
2013–2014	Anorthosis Famagusta	14	(1)
2014–2015	Maccabi Netanya	20	(1)
2015–2016	Hapoel Jerusalem	8	(1)

International career
2005–2007	Israel U-21	9	(1)
2006–2008	Israel	12	(2)
- * Club domestic league appearances and goals

Amit Ben Shushan (Hebrew: עמית בן שושן; born May 23, 1985) is an Israeli former football player.

Ben Shushan can play as a striker or as a supporting forward on the wing.

He made a name for himself after his series of goals during Beitar's Intertoto campaign in 2005.

He made his debut for the Israel national football team against Estonia on September 2, 2006, when he came in as a sub for teammate Michael Zandberg. In the next match against Andorra he played for 90 minutes scoring his first senior goal for his country and assisting for 2 more goals. On October 7, Ben Shushan scored Israel's only goal in the away match against Russia securing a draw that could have turned vital for Israel.

Ben Shushan is part of a group of young players who helped transform Beitar Jerusalem's youth into a leading Israeli soccer academy. At the time he joined Beitar, city rival Hapoel Jerusalem was still the leading youth team in Jerusalem. Despite living less than 200 meters away from Hapoel Jerusalem's training facility in Kiryat-Hayovel, Ben Shushan opted for Beitar.

== Anorthosis Famagusta ==
On 10 of July 2013, Shushan signed 2 years contract with yearly wages close to 140,000 euro.
