= 2009–10 Toto Cup Al =

Tournament details
- Country: Israel
- Teams: 16

Final positions
- Champions: Beitar Jerusalem (2nd title)
- Runners-up: Hapoel Ra'anana A.F.C.

Tournament statistics
- Matches played: 55
- Goals scored: 137 (2.49 per match)
- Top goal scorer(s): (Israel) Elnatan Salami (Nigeria) Toto Tamuz (5)

The 2009–10 Toto Cup Al was the twenty-eighth season of the third most important football tournament in Israel since its introduction and sixth under the current format. It was held in two stages. First, sixteen Premier League teams were divided into four groups. The winners and runners-up, were advanced to the knockout phase. Quarter-finals, Semi-finals and Final was held as one-legged matches, with the Final played at the Ramat Gan Stadium.

The defending champions were Maccabi Tel Aviv, making it their third Toto Cup title overall.

On 26 January 2010, Beitar Jerusalem won the 2009–10 Toto Cup Al making it their second Toto Cup title overall.

== Group stage ==
The matches were played from August 1 to December 15, 2009.

=== Group A ===
Pos	Team	Pld	W	D	L	GF	GA	GD	Pts	Qualification	HPT	MHA	MPT	HBS
1	Hapoel Petah Tikva	6	3	2	1	8	6	+2	11	Advance to knockout phase		1–1	3–1	1–1
2	Maccabi Haifa	6	2	3	1	5	3	+2	9	Advance to knockout phase	3–1		1–0	0–0
3	Maccabi Petah Tikva	6	2	1	3	7	8	−1	7		0–1	1–0		1–1
4	Hapoel Be'er Sheva	6	0	4	2	4	7	−3	4		0–1	0–0	2–4	

Source: football.org.il (in Hebrew)
Rules for classification: 1st points; 2nd goal difference; 3rd matches won; 4th goals scored; 5th head-to-head; 6th decision match

=== Group B ===
Pos	Team	Pld	W	D	L	GF	GA	GD	Pts	Qualification	MTA	ASH	BnS	HRG
1	Maccabi Tel Aviv	6	4	2	0	14	6	+8	14	Advance to knockout phase		4–0	3–2	2–0
2	F.C. Ashdod	6	2	2	2	9	12	−3	8	Advance to knockout phase	4–4		1–0	1–1
3	Bnei Sakhnin	6	2	1	3	6	7	−1	7		0–0	2–0		1–0
4	Hapoel Ramat Gan	6	1	1	4	5	9	−4	4		0–1	1–3	3–1	

Source: football.org.il (in Hebrew)
Rules for classification: 1st points; 2nd goal difference; 3rd matches won; 4th goals scored; 5th head-to-head; 6th decision match

=== Group C ===
Pos	Team	Pld	W	D	L	GF	GA	GD	Pts	Qualification	HRA	HAC	MAN	HHA
1	Hapoel Ra'anana	6	3	2	1	10	7	+3	11	Advance to knockout phase		1–1	3–4	2–1
2	Hapoel Acre	6	2	2	2	8	9	−1	8	Advance to knockout phase	0–1		3–1	3–2
3	Maccabi Ahi Nazareth	6	1	4	1	7	8	−1	6 (Note: Due to the Court's decision, no points were awarded for the game between Maccabi Ahi Nazareth and Hapoel Haifa, after Hapoel Haifa fielded an ineligible player, The original game was finished in a 2–0 win for Hapoel Haifa.)		0–0	1–1		0–0 (Note: Due to the Court's decision, no points were awarded for the game between Maccabi Ahi Nazareth and Hapoel Haifa, after Hapoel Haifa fielded an ineligible player, The original game was finished in a 2–0 win for Hapoel Haifa.)
4	Hapoel Haifa	6	1	2	3	8	9	−1	4		1–3	3–0	1–1	

Source: football.org.il (in Hebrew)
Rules for classification: 1st points; 2nd goal difference; 3rd matches won; 4th goals scored; 5th head-to-head; 6th decision match

=== Group D ===
Pos	Team	Pld	W	D	L	GF	GA	GD	Pts	Qualification	BEI	BnY	HTA	MNE
1	Beitar Jerusalem	6	4	1	1	10	3	+7	13 (Note: Maccabi Netanya received a technical loss of 0–3 to Beitar Jerusalem for fielding an ineligible player, The original game was finished in a 3–3 draw.)	Advance to knockout phase		0–0	1–0	3–1
2	Bnei Yehuda	6	3	2	1	4	3	+1	11	Advance to knockout phase	0–2		1–1	1–0
3	Hapoel Tel Aviv	6	1	2	3	7	9	−2	5		2–1	0–1		2–2
4	Maccabi Netanya	6	1	1	4	6	12	−6	4		0–3 (Note: Maccabi Netanya received a technical loss of 0–3 to Beitar Jerusalem for fielding an ineligible player, The original game was finished in a 3–3 draw.)	0–1	3–2	

Source: football.org.il (in Hebrew)
Rules for classification: 1st points; 2nd goal difference; 3rd matches won; 4th goals scored; 5th head-to-head; 6th decision match

== Knockout phase ==
=== Quarter-finals ===
December 22, 2009
20:02 UTC+2

Hapoel Acre	0 – 3	Beitar Jerusalem
	Report	29', 40' Tamuz; 84' Baruchyan

Green Stadium, Nazareth Illit
Attendance: 300
Referee: Daniel Bar Natan

December 23, 2009
18:00 UTC+2

Maccabi Haifa	2 – 1	Hapoel Petah Tikva
Hanoun 58' (pen.)	Report	47' Dvalishvili; 66' Zaguri

Kiryat Eliezer Stadium, Haifa
Attendance: 500
Referee: Ziv Adler

December 23, 2009
20:00 UTC+2

Maccabi Tel Aviv	5 – 0	F.C. Ashdod
Avidor 29'; Zion 59' (o.g.); Shivhon 76'; Mayuka 82'; Komac 86'	Report

Bloomfield Stadium, Tel Aviv
Attendance: 500
Referee: Eitan Shmuelevich

December 30, 2009
20:30 UTC+2

Hapoel Ra'anana	1 – 0	Bnei Yehuda
Shooker 49'	Report

Levita Stadium, Kfar Saba
Attendance: 300
Referee: Halim Zatma

=== Semi-finals ===
The draw for the semi-finals took place on 31 December 2009, with matches played two weeks later on 13 January 2010.

January 13, 2010
17:30 UTC+2

Hapoel Ra'anana	3 – 2	Maccabi Haifa
Tuef 45' (pen.); Digmalishvili 60'; R. Cohen 74'	Report	13' Ghadir; 59' Rafaelov

Ramat Gan Stadium, Ramat Gan
Referee: Shai Shitrit

January 13, 2010
20:00 UTC+2

Beitar Jerusalem	1 – 0	Maccabi Tel Aviv
Tamuz 48'	Report

Ramat Gan Stadium, Ramat Gan
Referee: Liran Liani

=== Final ===
January 26, 2010
19:45 UTC+2

Hapoel Ra'anana	0 – 1	Beitar Jerusalem
	Report	51' Vered

Ramat Gan Stadium, Ramat Gan
Attendance: 5,646
Referee: Menashe Mashiah

== See also ==
- 2009–10 Toto Cup Leumit
- 2009–10 Israeli Premier League
- 2009–10 Israel State Cup
