= Toto Tamuz =

Israeli footballer

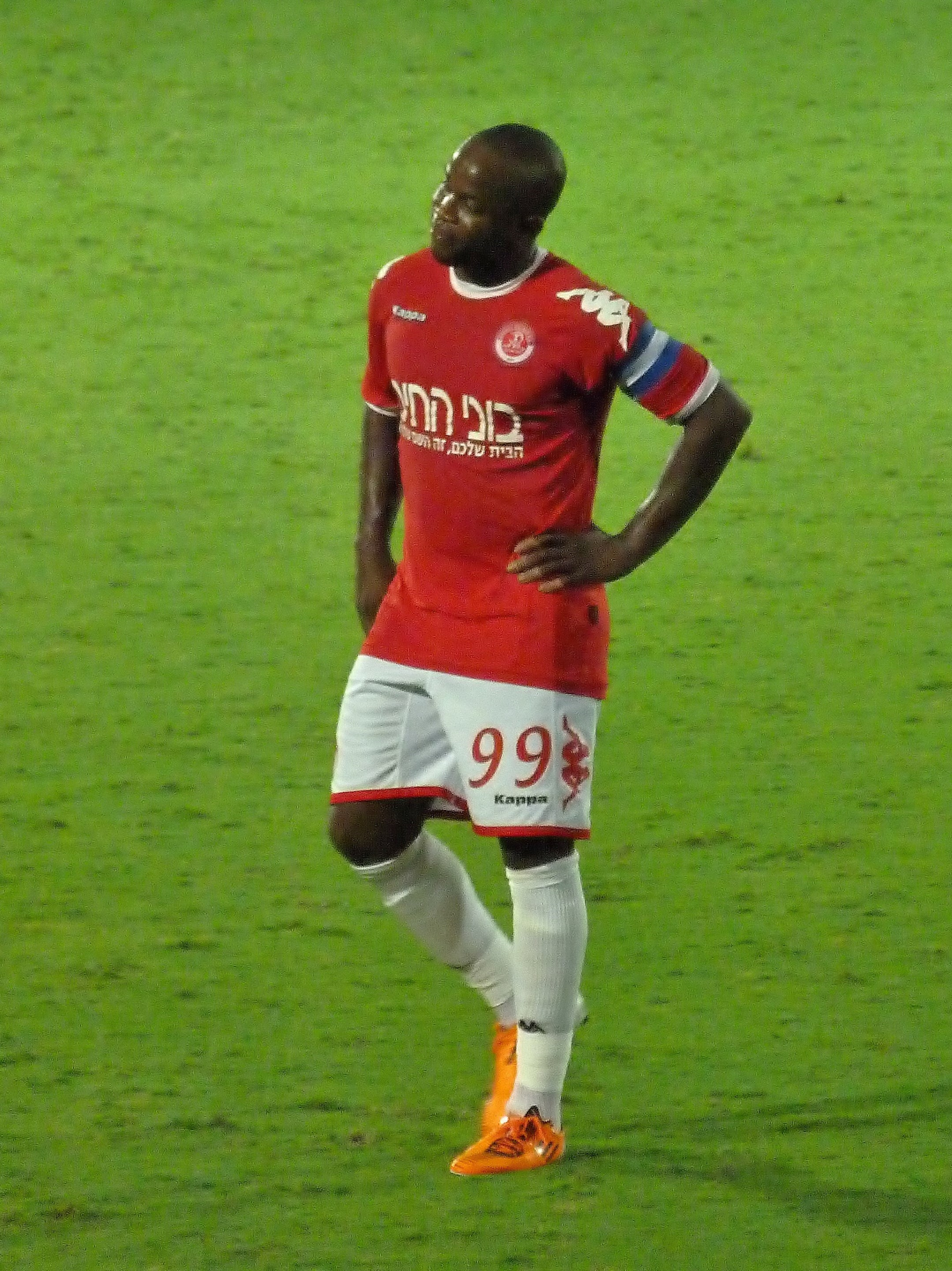
- Tamuz playing for Hapoel Tel Aviv in 2011

Personal information
- Full name: Toto Adaruns Tamuz Temile
- Date of birth: 1 April 1988 (age 38)
- Place of birth: Warri, Nigeria
- Height: 1.78 m (5 ft 10 in)
- Position: Forward

Youth career
- 2002–2005: Hapoel Petah Tikva

Senior career*
Years	Team	Apps	(Gls)
2005–2006	Hapoel Petah Tikva	28	(11)
2006–2010	Beitar Jerusalem	95	(33)
2010–2013	Hapoel Tel Aviv	88	(44)
2013	Ural Sverdlovsk	7	(0)
2014–2016	Petrolul Ploiești	50	(14)
2016	Hunan Billows	10	(2)
2017	Hapoel Tel Aviv	9	(1)
2018	Petrolul Ploiești	4	(0)
Total		291	(105)

International career
2006	Israel U18	2	(0)
2006–2007	Israel U19	9	(4)
2006–2009	Israel U21	11	(3)
2006–2007	Israel	10	(2)
- * Club domestic league appearances and goals

Toto Adaruns Tamuz Temile (Hebrew: טוטו אדיוראנס תמוז טמילה; born 1 April 1988) is a former professional footballer who played as a forward.

Born in Nigeria, he grew up in Israel from infancy after his father, Nigerian footballer Clement Temile, moved there. From 2006 to 2007, he made ten appearances for the Israel national team, scoring twice.

== Early life ==
Born in Warri, Nigeria, his parents came to Israel in 1990, where his father, Nigerian footballer Clement Temile, played professionally for Beitar Netanya. His cousins Omonigho Temile and Frank Temile were also footballers. When Beitar Netanya ran into financial difficulties and was forced to stop paying salaries, his parents reverted to working various odd jobs. His parents left Israel in 1991 to try to find gainful employment in Nigeria or elsewhere, leaving Toto temporarily with a teammate of his father. When it became obvious that his parents were not coming back for him, Toto was adopted (unofficially) by Israeli citizen Orit Tamuz who cared for him and raised him as her own child, which is where his Hebrew surname Tamuz derives from. Although it is unclear if he formally converted to Judaism, it was stated in a 2007 Ynetnews article that Tamuz was raised Jewish, attending the synagogue on holidays and performing kiddush each Friday.

== Club career ==
Tamuz started to play organised football at Hapoel Petah Tikva, where he made his professional debut during the 2005–06 Israeli Premier League in a match against F.C. Ashdod. His debut made national headlines after he scored two goals during the match.

=== Beitar Jerusalem ===
Tamuz signed a deal with Ronen Katzav making him his agent. After declaring on numerous occasions that he was not interested in a big money contract, he ended up declaring his will to be transferred to Beitar Jerusalem citing moves made by the management of the club.

After officially signing with Beitar, Tamuz had to apply for visas to the Netherlands and Romania to join the club for its training camps because he possessed an Israeli travel document and not an Israeli passport.

Tamuz won five titles as a Beitar Jerusalem player: two championships, two State Cups and one Toto Cup. On his way to win the Toto Cup, Tamuz scored five of Beitar Jerusalem's 15 goals in the 2009–10 Toto Cup.

=== Hapoel Tel Aviv ===
Tamuz signed for Hapoel Tel Aviv in August 2010 for undisclosed fee. On 11 September, he scored on his league debut for Hapoel in a 2–2 draw with Hapoel Acre.

=== Petrolul Ploiești ===
In February 2014, Tamuz signed a two-and-a-half-year contract to play for Petrolul Ploiești. He scored his first goal on 2 March, against Oțelul Galați, in Liga I. On 16 April, he scored a header in the semi-finals second leg in Cupa României, against Astra Giurgiu, but Petrolul lost 2–1 on aggregate.

On 7 August 2014, Tamuz scored the last goal of an eventual 4–1 win against Viktoria Plzeň, in the Europa League third qualifying round second leg. Tamuz also scored against Dinamo Zagreb in the first leg of the play-off, but Petrolul lost the match 3–1. After a good season debut with Petrolul, he was called up to the Israel national team to play in the UEFA Euro 2016 qualifiers. On 21 September, Tamuz scored a doppietta against Steaua București, but unfortunately, Petrolul lost the match 3–2.

In July 2016, Tamuz signed a short-term deal with China League One club Hunan Billows. He scored two goals in ten league appearances for the club.

On 19 January 2017, Tamuz signed to Hapoel Tel Aviv until the end of the season.

== International career ==
=== Israeli citizenship ===
Though most of his formulative years were spent in Israel, Tamuz still did not carry full Israeli citizenship. His legal status in Israel was indeterminable for many years until then Deputy Interior Minister Ruhama Avraham granted him an Israeli A1 visa granting temporary resident status for a term of three years. After petitioning to FIFA, and given that he has no other citizenship, Tamuz received special permission to play on Israel national teams even though he still did not possess an Israeli passport, but only an Israeli laissez-passer. After his temporary visa expired, Tamuz was unable to play for the Israel national team until he received full Israeli citizenship, a process which could take three years. The Israel Interior Office had refused attempts to fast-track his application. However, his eligibility was confirmed when his case was taken to the Israeli Supreme Court. After Tamuz began the formal naturalisation process, he was named in the Israeli squad for matches against England and Estonia in March 2007. Three months later in 2007, Tamuz was granted full Israeli citizenship along with Roberto Colautti (originally from Argentina), after their respective applications were approved by the Minister of Internal Affairs Roni Bar-On.

=== Appearances for Israel ===
On 6 September 2006, Tamuz made his debut for Israel at the age of 18, against Andorra in a UEFA Euro 2008 qualifying match (played at Goffertstadion, Nijmegen, but classed as a home tie). He scored on his debut, and on 6 June 2007, and against the same opponents, he scored again.

== Career statistics ==
Scores and results list Israel's goal tally first, score column indicates score after each Tamuz goal.

List of international goals scored by Toto Tamuz
No.	Date	Venue	Cap	Opponent	Score	Result	Competition
1	6 September 2006	Goffertstadion, Nijmegen, Netherlands	1	Andorra	4–0	4–1	UEFA Euro 2008 qualifying
2	6 June 2007	Estadi Comunal, Andorra la Vella, Andorra	6	Andorra	1–0	2–0	UEFA Euro 2008 qualifying

== Honours ==
Beitar Jerusalem:

- Israeli Premier League: 2006–07, 2007–08
- Israel State Cup: 2007–08, 2008–09
- Toto Cup: 2009–10

Hapoel Tel Aviv:

- Israeli Premier League: runner-up 2010–11, 2011–12
- Israel State Cup: 2010–11, 2011–12
- Toto Cup: runner-up 2011–12

Individual

- Israeli Premier League top scorer: 2010–11 (21 goals)
