= Maccabi Haifa F.C. in European football =

Israeli club in European football

- Club: Maccabi Haifa
- Most appearances: Yaniv Katan (70)
- Top scorer: Alon Mizrahi; Yaniv Katan (15 goals each)
- First entry: 1985 Intertoto Cup
- Latest entry: 2025–26 UEFA Conference League
- Matches: 192
- Largest win: 8–0 vs Khazar Lankaran (2013–14 UEFA Europa League)
- Largest loss: 2–8 vs Arminia Bielefeld (1985 Intertoto Cup)

Maccabi Haifa Football Club is one of the three most successful Israeli clubs in European competition. Maccabi Haifa was the first Israeli to qualify for the Champions League Group stage, the first to do so twice and the only one to do so three times. Maccabi Haifa has also qualified to the Quarter-finals of European Cup Winners' Cup, to the Round of 16 in UEFA cup and one time to the Round of 16 of the UEFA Conference League. In the Second qualifying round of Europa League, they won 8–0 vs Khazar Lankaran a new record or any Israeli team in European competition. Over the years Maccabi Haifa has played against large clubs in the same continent, such as Paris Saint-Germain, Manchester United, Liverpool, Bayern Munich or Juventus.

== List of matches in European competitions ==
=== Before joining UEFA ===
Season	Competition	Round	Country	Club	First leg	Second leg	Aggregate	Ref.
1985	Intertoto Cup	Group stage	(Israel)	Beitar Jerusalem	3–0 (H) (Note: Match played in Ramat Gan Stadium)	3–1 (A)	First Place	
1985	Intertoto Cup	Group stage	(Germany)	Arminia Bielefeld	2–1 (H)	2–8 (A)	First Place	
1985	Intertoto Cup	Group stage	(Austria)	SK Sturm Graz	1–1 (H)	2–1 (A)	First Place	
1986	Intertoto Cup	Group stage	(Israel)	Hapoel Tel Aviv	2–2 (H)	2–2 (A)	Second Place	
1986	Intertoto Cup	Group stage	(Austria)	GAK Grazer	1–0 (H)	1–0 (A)	Second Place	
1986	Intertoto Cup	Group stage	(Denmark)	Lyngby Boldklub	1–2 (H)	0–4 (A)	Second Place	
1990	Intertoto Cup	Group stage	(Hungary)	Siófok Bányász	3–0 (H)	0–0 (A)	Second Place	
1990	Intertoto Cup	Group stage	(Poland)	Lech Poznań	4–2 (H)	0–1 (A)	Second Place	
1990	Intertoto Cup	Group stage	(Israel)	Bnei Yehuda Tel Aviv	2–2 (H)	5–0 (A)	Second Place	
1991	Intertoto Cup	Group stage	(Germany)	FC Saarbrücken	0–6 (H)	1–5 (A)	Third Place	
1991	Intertoto Cup	Group stage	(Sweden)	Örebro	0–3 (H)	0–1 (A)	Third Place	
1991	Intertoto Cup	Group stage	(Israel)	Hapoel Petah Tikva	3–2 (H)	2–0 (A)	Third Place	

=== After joining UEFA ===
Season	Competition	Round	Country	Opponent	First leg	Second leg	Aggregate	Ref.
1993–94	Winners' Cup	Qualifying round	(Luxembourg)	Dudelange	1–0 (A)	6–1 (H)	7–1	
1993–94	Winners' Cup	First round	(Russia)	Torpedo Moscow	0–1 (A)	3–1 (H)	3–2	
1993–94	Winners' Cup	Second round	(Italy)	Parma	0–1 (H)	1–0 (A)	1–1 (Note: Lost by penalty shoot-out)	
1994–95	Champions League	Qualifying round	(Austria)	Casino Salzburg	1–2 (H)	1–3 (A)	2–5	
1995–96	Winners' Cup	Qualifying round	(Faroe Islands)	KÍ Klaksvík	4–0 (H)	2–3 (A)	6–3	
1995–96	Winners' Cup	First round	(Portugal)	Sporting CP	0–4 (A)	0–0 (H)	0–4	
1996–97	UEFA Cup	Preliminary round	(Federal Republic of Yugoslavia)	Partizan Belgrade	0–1 (H) (Note: Match played in Herzliya Municipal Stadium)	1–3 (A)	1–4	
1997	Intertoto Cup	Group stage	(Federal Republic of Yugoslavia)	Proleter Zrenjanin	0–4 (A)	—N/a	Fifth place	
1997	Intertoto Cup	Group stage	(Slovenia)	Publikum	0–1 (H)	—N/a	Fifth place	
1997	Intertoto Cup	Group stage	(Turkey)	Antalyaspor	2–0 (A)	—N/a	Fifth place	
1997	Intertoto Cup	Group stage	(Russia)	Lokomotiv Nizhny Novgorod	0–4 (H)	—N/a	Fifth place	
1998–99	Winners' Cup	Qualifying round	(Northern Ireland)	Glentoran	1–0 (A)	2–1 (H)	3–1	
1998–99	Winners' Cup	First round	(France)	Paris Saint-Germain	1–1 (A)	3–2 (H)	4–3	
1998–99	Winners' Cup	Second round	(Austria)	Ried	1–2 (A)	4–1 (H)	5–3	
1998–99	Winners' Cup	Quarter-finals	(Russia)	Lokomotiv Moscow	0–3 (A)	0–1 (H)	0–4	
1999	Intertoto Cup	First round	(Azerbaijan)	Qarabağ Agdam	1–2 (H) (Note: Match played in Haberfeld Stadium, Rishon LeZion)	1–0 (A)	2–2 (Note: Lost by Away goals rule)	
2000–01	UEFA Cup	Qualifying round	(Belarus)	Slavia Mozyr	1–1 (A)	0–0 (H)	1–1 (Note: Won by Away goals rule)	
2000–01	UEFA Cup	First round	(Netherlands)	Vitesse Arnhem	0–3 (A)	2–1 (H)	2–4	
2001–02	Champions League	Second qualifying round	(Finland)	Haka	1–0 (A)	0–3 (H) (Note: Maccabi Haifa Won 4–0 but was awarded 0–3 against them for fielding a suspended player)	1–3	
2002–03	Champions League	Second qualifying round	(Belarus)	Belshina Bobruisk	4–0 (H) (Note: Match played in Nicosia, Cyprus after UEFA banned international matches from being played in Israel.)	1–0 (A)	5–0	
2002–03	Champions League	Third qualifying round	(Austria)	Sturm Graz	2–0 (H) (Note: Match played in Sofia, Bulgaria after UEFA banned international matches from being played in Israel.)	3–3 (A)	5–3	
2002–03	Champions League	First Group stage	(England)	Manchester United	2–5 (A)	3–0 (H)	Third Place	
2002–03	Champions League	First Group stage	(Greece)	Olympiacos	3–0 (H)	3–3 (A)	Third Place	
2002–03	Champions League	First Group stage	(Germany)	Bayer Leverkusen	0–2 (H)	1–2 (A)	Third Place	
2002–03	UEFA Cup	Third round	(Greece)	AEK Athens	0–4 (A)	1–4 (H)	1–8	
2003–04	UEFA Cup	Qualifying round	(Wales)	Cwmbrân Town	3–0 (A)	3–0 (H) (Note: Match played in İzmir, Turkey after UEFA banned international matches from being played in Israel.)	6–0	
2003–04	UEFA Cup	First round	(Slovenia)	Publikum	2–1 (H)	2–2 (A)	4–3	
2003–04	UEFA Cup	Second round	(Spain)	Valencia	0–0 (A)	0–4 (H) (Note: Match played in Rotterdam, Netherlands after UEFA banned international matches from being played in Israel.)	0–4	
2004–05	Champions League	Third qualifying round	(Norway)	Rosenborg	1–2 (A)	2–3 (H) (Note: After Extra Time)	3–5	
2004–05	UEFA Cup	First round	(Ukraine)	Dnipro Dnipropetrovsk	1–0 (H) (Note: Match played in Bloomfield Stadium, Tel Aviv.)	0–2 (A)	1–2	
2005–06	Champions League	Second qualifying round	(Sweden)	Malmö	2–3 (A)	2–2 (H)	4–5	
2006–07	Champions League	Third qualifying round	(England)	Liverpool	1–2 (A)	1–1 (H) (Note: Match played in Kyiv, Ukraine after UEFA banned international matches from being played in Israel.)	2–3	
2006–07	UEFA Cup	First round	(Bulgaria)	Litex Lovech	1–1 (H) (Note: Match played in Nijmegen, Netherlands after UEFA banned international matches from being played in Israel.)	3–1 (A)	4–2	
2006–07	UEFA Cup	Group stage	(France)	Auxerre	3–1 (H)	—N/a	Second place	
2006–07	UEFA Cup	Group stage	(Scotland)	Rangers	0–2 (A)	—N/a	Second place	
2006–07	UEFA Cup	Group stage	(Serbia)	Partizan Belgrade	1–0 (H)	—N/a	Second place	
2006–07	UEFA Cup	Group stage	(Italy)	Livorno	1–1 (A)	—N/a	Second place	
2006–07	UEFA Cup	Round of 32	(Russia)	CSKA Moscow	0–0 (A) (Note: Match played in Vladikavkaz.)	1–0 (H)	1–0	
2006–07	UEFA Cup	Round of 16	(Spain)	Espanyol	0–0 (H)	0–4 (A)	0–4	
2007	Intertoto Cup	Second round	(Romania)	Gloria Bistrița	0–2 (H)	2–0 (A)	2–2	
2009–10	Champions League	Second qualifying round	(Northern Ireland)	Glentoran	6–0 (H)	4–0 (A)	10–0	
2009–10	Champions League	Third qualifying round	(Kazakhstan)	FC Aktobe	0–0 (A)	4–3 (H)	4–3	
2009–10	Champions League	Play-off round	(Austria)	Red Bull Salzburg	2–1 (A)	3–0 (H)	5–1	
2009–10	Champions League	Group stage	(Germany)	Bayern Munich	0–3 (H)	0–1 (A)	Fourth Place	
2009–10	Champions League	Group stage	(France)	Bordeaux	0–1 (A)	0–1 (H)	Fourth Place	
2009–10	Champions League	Group stage	(Italy)	Juventus	0–1 (A)	0–1 (H)	Fourth Place	
2010–11	Europa League	Third qualifying round	(Belarus)	Dinamo Minsk	1–0 (H)	1–3 (A)	2–3	
2011–12	Champions League	Second qualifying round	(Bosnia and Herzegovina)	Borac Banja Luka	5–1 (H)	2–3 (A)	7–4	
2011–12	Champions League	Third qualifying round	(Slovenia)	Maribor	2–1 (H)	1–1 (A)	3–2	
2011–12	Champions League	Play-off round	(Belgium)	Genk	2–1 (H)	1–2 (A)	3–3	
2011–12	Europa League	Group stage	(Cyprus)	AEK Larnaca	1–0 (H)	1–2 (A)	Third Place	
2011–12	Europa League	Group stage	(Germany)	Schalke 04	1–3 (A)	0–3 (H)	Third Place	
2011–12	Europa League	Group stage	(Romania)	Steaua București	5–0 (H)	2–4 (A)	Third Place	
2013–14	Europa League	Second qualifying round	(Azerbaijan)	Khazar Lankaran	2–0 (H)	8–0 (A)	10–0	
2013–14	Europa League	Third qualifying round	(Latvia)	Ventspils	0–0 (A)	3–0 (H)	3–0	
2013–14	Europa League	Play-off round	(Romania)	Astra Giurgiu	2–0 (H)	1–1 (A)	3–1	
2013–14	Europa League	Group stage	(Netherlands)	Alkmaar	0–1 (H)	0–2 (A)	Third Place	
2013–14	Europa League	Group stage	(Kazakhstan)	Shakhter Karagandy	2–2 (A)	2–1 (H)	Third Place	
2013–14	Europa League	Group stage	(Greece)	PAOK Thessaloniki	2–3 (A)	0–0 (H)	Third Place	
2016–17	Europa League	Second qualifying round	(Estonia)	Nõmme Kalju	1–1 (H) (Note: Match played in Netanya Stadium.)	1–1 (A)	2–2	
2019–20	Europa League	First qualifying round	(Slovenia)	Mura	2–0 (H)	3–2 (A)	5–2	
2019–20	Europa League	Second qualifying round	(France)	Strasbourg	1–3 (A)	2–1 (H)	3–4	
2020–21	Europa League	First qualifying round	(Bosnia and Herzegovina)	Željezničar	3–1 (H)	—N/a	—N/a	
2020–21	Europa League	Second qualifying round	(Kazakhstan)	Kairat	2–1 (H)	—N/a	—N/a	
2020–21	Europa League	Third qualifying round	(Russia)	Rostov	2–1 (A)	—N/a	—N/a	
2020–21	Europa League	Play-off round	(England)	Tottenham Hotspur	2–7 (A)	—N/a	—N/a	
2021–22	Champions League	First qualifying round	(Kazakhstan)	Kairat	1–1 (H)	0–2 (A)	1–3	
2021–22	Europa Conference League	Second qualifying round	(Georgia (country))	Dinamo Tbilisi	2–1 (A)	5–1 (H)	7–2	
2021–22	Europa Conference League	Third qualifying round	(Faroe Islands)	HB Tórshavn	7–2 (H)	0–1 (A)	7–3	
2021–22	Europa Conference League	Play-off round	(Azerbaijan)	Neftçi Baku	3–3 (A)	4–0 (H)	7–3	
2021–22	Europa Conference League	Group stage	(Netherlands)	Feyenoord	0–0 (H)	1–2 (A)	Fourth Place	
2021–22	Europa Conference League	Group stage	(Germany)	Union Berlin	0–3 (A)	0–1 (H)	Fourth Place	
2021–22	Europa Conference League	Group stage	(Czech Republic)	Slavia Prague	1–0 (H)	0–1 (A)	Fourth Place	
2022–23	Champions League	Second qualifying round	(Greece)	Olympiacos	1–1 (H)	4–0 (A)	5–1	
2022–23	Champions League	Third qualifying round	(Cyprus)	Apollon Limassol	4–0 (H)	0–2 (A)	4–2	
2022–23	Champions League	Play-off round	(Serbia)	Red Star Belgrade	3–2 (H)	2–2 (A)	5–4	
2022–23	Champions League	Group stage	(Portugal)	Benfica Lisbon	0–2 (A)	1–6 (H)	Fourth Place	
2022–23	Champions League	Group stage	(France)	Paris Saint-Germain	1–3 (H)	2–7 (A)	Fourth Place	
2022–23	Champions League	Group stage	(Italy)	Juventus	1–3 (A)	2–0 (H)	Fourth Place	
2023–24	Champions League	First qualifying round	(Malta)	Ħamrun Spartans	4–0 (A)	2–1 (H)	6–1	
2023–24	Champions League	Second qualifying round	(Moldova)	Sheriff Tiraspol	0–1 (A)	4–1 (H)	4–2	
2023–24	Champions League	Third qualifying round	(Slovakia)	Slovan Bratislava	2–1 (A)	3–1 (H)	5–2	
2023–24	Champions League	Play-off round	(Switzerland)	Young Boys	0–0 (H)	0–3 (A)	0–3	
2023–24	Europa League	Group stage	(France)	Rennais	0–3 (A)	0–3 (H) (Note: Match played in Budapest, Hungary after UEFA banned international matches from being played in Israel.)	Third Place	
2023–24	Europa League	Group stage	(Greece)	Panathinaikos	0–0 (H)	2–1 (A)	Third Place	
2023–24	Europa League	Group stage	(Spain)	Villarreal	0–0 (A)	1–2 (H) (Note: Match played in Larnaca, Cyprus after UEFA banned international matches from being played in Israel.)	Third Place	
2023–24	Europa Conference League	Knockout round play-offs	(Belgium)	Gent	1–0 (H)	1–1 (A)	2–1	
2023–24	Europa Conference League	Round of 16	(Italy)	Fiorentina	3–4 (H)	1–1 (A)	4–5	
2024–25	Conference League	Second qualifying round	(Azerbaijan)	Sabah	0−3 (H) (Note: Match played in Kisvárda, Hungary after UEFA banned international matches from being played in Israel.)	6−3 (A)	6–6	
2025–26	Conference League	Second qualifying round	(Belarus)	Torpedo-BelAZ Zhodino	1–1 (A) (Note: Match played in Szombathely, Hungary after UEFA banned international matches from being played in Belarus.)	3–0 (H)	4–1	
2025–26	Conference League	Third qualifying round	(Poland)	Raków Częstochowa	1–0 (A)	0–2 (H) (Note: Match played in Debrecen, Hungary after UEFA banned international matches from being played in Israel.)	1–2	

== Maccabi Haifa in European group stages ==
=== Champions League ===
==== 2002–03 Group F ====
Pos	Team	Pld	W	D	L	GF	GA	GD	Pts	Qualification	MUN	LEV	MHA	OLY
1	(England) Manchester United	6	5	0	1	16	8	+8	15	Advance to second group stage	—	2–0	5–2	4–0
2	(Germany) Bayer Leverkusen	6	3	0	3	9	11	−2	9	Advance to second group stage	1–2	—	2–1	2–0
3	(Israel) Maccabi Haifa	6	2	1	3	12	12	0	7	Transfer to UEFA Cup	3–0	0–2	—	3–0
4	(Greece) Olympiacos	6	1	1	4	11	17	−6	4		2–3	6–2	3–3	—

Source: RSSSF
Legend: Blue = home team win; Yellow = draw; Red = away team win.

==== 2009–10 Group A ====
Pos	Team	Pld	W	D	L	GF	GA	GD	Pts	Qualification	BOR	BAY	JUV	MHA
1	(France) Bordeaux	6	5	1	0	9	2	+7	16	Advance to knockout phase	—	2–1	2–0	1–0
2	(Germany) Bayern Munich	6	3	1	2	9	5	+4	10	Advance to knockout phase	0–2	—	0–0	1–0
3	(Italy) Juventus	6	2	2	2	4	7	−3	8	Transfer to Europa League	1–1	1–4	—	1–0
4	(Israel) Maccabi Haifa	6	0	0	6	0	8	−8	0		0–1	0–3	0–1	—

Source: RSSSF
Legend: Blue = home team win; Yellow = draw; Red = away team win.

==== 2022–23 Group H ====
Pos	Team	Pld	W	D	L	GF	GA	GD	Pts	Qualification	BEN	PAR	JUV	MHA
1	(Portugal) Benfica	6	4	2	0	16	7	+9	14 (Note: Tied on head-to-head results, overall goal difference and overall goals scored. Overall away goals scored: Benfica 9, Paris Saint-Germain 6.)	Advance to knockout phase	—	1–1	4–3	2–0
2	(France) Paris Saint-Germain	6	4	2	0	16	7	+9	14	Advance to knockout phase	1–1	—	2–1	7–2
3	(Italy) Juventus	6	1	0	5	9	13	−4	3 (Note: Tied on head-to-head results. Overall goal difference is used as the tiebreaker.)	Transfer to Europa League	1–2	1–2	—	3–1
4	(Israel) Maccabi Haifa	6	1	0	5	7	21	−14	3		1–6	1–3	2–0	—

Source: UEFA
Legend: Blue = home team win; Yellow = draw; Red = away team win.
Rules for classification: Group stage tiebreakers

=== Europa League ===
==== 2011–12 Group J ====
Pos	Team	Pld	W	D	L	GF	GA	GD	Pts	Qualification	SCH	SB	MHA	AEK
1	(Germany) Schalke 04	6	4	2	0	13	2	+11	14	Advance to knockout phase	—	2–1	3–1	0–0
2	(Romania) Steaua București	6	2	2	2	9	11	−2	8	Advance to knockout phase	0–0	—	4–2	3–1
3	(Israel) Maccabi Haifa	6	2	0	4	10	12	−2	6		0–3	5–0	—	1–0
4	(Cyprus) AEK Larnaca	6	1	2	3	4	11	−7	5		0–5	1–1	2–1	—

Source: Soccerway
Legend: Blue = home team win; Yellow = draw; Red = away team win.

==== 2013–14 Group L ====
Pos	Team	Pld	W	D	L	GF	GA	GD	Pts	Qualification	AZ	PAO	MHA	SHA
1	(Netherlands) AZ	6	3	3	0	8	4	+4	12 (Note: Tied on head-to-head points (2) and head-to-head goal difference (0). Head-to-head away goals: AZ 2, PAOK 1.)	Advance to knockout phase	—	1–1	2–0	1–0
2	(Greece) PAOK	6	3	3	0	10	6	+4	12	Advance to knockout phase	2–2	—	3–2	2–1
3	(Israel) Maccabi Haifa	6	1	2	3	6	9	−3	5		0–1	0–0	—	2–1
4	(Kazakhstan) Shakhter Karagandy	6	0	2	4	5	10	−5	2		1–1	0–2	2–2	—

Source: Soccerway
Legend: Blue = home team win; Yellow = draw; Red = away team win.

==== 2023–24 Group F ====
Pos	Team	Pld	W	D	L	GF	GA	GD	Pts	Qualification	VIL	REN	MHA	PAO
1	(Spain) Villarreal	6	4	1	1	9	7	+2	13	Advance to round of 16	—	1–0	0–0	3–2
2	(France) Rennes	6	4	0	2	13	6	+7	12	Advance to knockout round play-offs	2–3	—	3–0	3–1
3	(Israel) Maccabi Haifa	6	1	2	3	3	9	−6	5	Transfer to Europa Conference League	1–2	0–3	—	0–0
4	(Greece) Panathinaikos	6	1	1	4	7	10	−3	4		2–0	1–2	1–2	—

Source: UEFA
Legend: Blue = home team win; Yellow = draw; Red = away team win.
Rules for classification: Group stage tiebreakers

=== Europa Conference League ===
==== 2021–22 Group E ====
Pos	Team	Pld	W	D	L	GF	GA	GD	Pts	Qualification	FEY	SLA	UNI	MHA
1	(Netherlands) Feyenoord	6	4	2	0	11	6	+5	14	Advance to round of 16	—	2–1	3–1	2–1
2	(Czech Republic) Slavia Prague	6	2	2	2	8	7	+1	8	Advance to knockout round play-offs	2–2	—	3–1	1–0
3	(Germany) Union Berlin	6	2	1	3	8	9	−1	7		1–2	1–1	—	3–0
4	(Israel) Maccabi Haifa	6	1	1	4	2	7	−5	4		0–0	1–0	0–1	—

Source: UEFA
Legend: Blue = home team win; Yellow = draw; Red = away team win.
Rules for classification: Group stage tiebreakers

=== UEFA Cup ===
==== 2006–07 Group A ====
Pos	Team	Pld	W	D	L	GF	GA	GD	Pts	Qualification	RAN	MHA	LIV	AUX	PTZ
1	(Scotland) Rangers	4	3	1	0	8	4	+4	10	Advance to knockout stage	—	2–0	—	—	1–0
2	(Israel) Maccabi Haifa	4	2	1	1	5	4	+1	7	Advance to knockout stage	—	—	—	3–1	1–0
3	(Italy) Livorno	4	1	2	1	5	5	0	5	Advance to knockout stage	2–3	1–1	—	—	—
4	(France) Auxerre	4	1	1	2	7	7	0	4		2–2	—	0–1	—	—
5	(Serbia) Partizan	4	0	1	3	2	7	−5	1		—	—	1–1	1–4	—

Legend: Blue = home team win; Yellow = draw; Red = away team win.

== Maccabi Haifa in European knockout phases ==
=== UEFA Cup ===
==== 2002–03 ====
28 November 2002 Round of 32 — 1st leg	AEK Athens (Greece)	4–0	(Israel) Maccabi Haifa	Nikos Goumas Stadium, Athens
21:15	Georgatos 13'; Nikolaidis 23'; Petkov 30'; Zagorakis 35'	Report		Attendance: 8,695; Referee: Paulo Costa (Portugal)

12 December 2002 Round of 32 — 2nd leg	Maccabi Haifa (Israel)	1–4	(Greece) AEK Athens	GSP Stadium, Nicosia
20:30	Badir 5' (pen.)	Report	56' Katsouranis; 80', 90' Lakis; 90+3' Nalitzis	Attendance: 1,615; Referee: Knud Erik Fisker (Denmark)

AEK Athens won 8–1 on aggregate.

==== 2006–07 ====
14 February 2007 Round of 32 — 1st leg	CSKA Moscow (Russia)	0–0	(Israel) Maccabi Haifa	Republican Spartak Stadium, Vladikavkaz
18:00		Report		Attendance: 18,100; Referee: Darko Ceferin (Slovenia)

22 February 2007 Round of 32 — 2nd leg	Maccabi Haifa (Israel)	1–0	(Russia) CSKA Moscow	Bloomfield Stadium, Tel Aviv
19:45	Colautti 13'	Report		Attendance: 15,000; Referee: Gerald Lehner (Austria)

Maccabi Haifa won 1–0 on aggregate.

8 March 2007 Round of 16 — 1st leg	Maccabi Haifa (Israel)	0–0	(Spain) Espanyol	Bloomfield Stadium, Tel Aviv
19:45		Report		Attendance: 14,700; Referee: Ivan Bebek (Croatia)

15 March 2007 Round of 16 — 2nd leg	Espanyol (Spain)	4–0	(Israel) Maccabi Haifa	Estadi Olímpic Lluís Companys, Barcelona
22:30	De la Peña 53'; Tamudo 59'; L. García 61'; Pandiani 90'	Report		Attendance: 16,150; Referee: Peter Fröjdfeldt (Sweden)

Espanyol won 4–0 on aggregate.

=== UEFA Cup Winners' Cup ===
==== 1993–94 ====
20 October 1993 Second round — 1st leg	Maccabi Haifa (Israel)	0–1	(Italy) Parma	Kiryat Eliezer Stadium, Haifa
16:30			90' Brolin	Attendance: 3,973; Referee: Gheorghe Constantin (Romania)

3 November 1993 Second round — 2nd leg	Parma (Italy)	0–1 (3–1 p)	(Israel) Maccabi Haifa	Stadio Ennio Tardini, Parma
19:00			51' Mizrahi	Attendance: 9,312; Referee: Ahmet Çakar (Turkey)
	Penalties
	Crippa (penalty scored); Minotti (penalty scored); Brolin (penalty scored)		(penalty missed) Mizrahi; (penalty scored) Glam; (penalty missed) Harazi; (penalty missed) Atar

1–1 on aggregate; Parma won 3–1 on penalties.

==== 1998–99 ====
22 October 1998 Round of 32 — 1st leg	Ried (Austria)	2–1	(Israel) Maccabi Haifa	Linzer Stadion, Linz
18:30	Śliwowski 22'; Strafner 88'		13' Mizrahi	Attendance: 5,000; Referee: Adrian Stoica (Romania)

5 November 1998 Round of 32 — 2nd leg	Maccabi Haifa (Israel)	4–1	(Austria) Ried	Kiryat Eliezer Stadium, Haifa
19:00	Mizrahi 32'; Keisi 62'; Benayoun 72'; Duro 90'		70' Aničić	Attendance: 17,100; Referee: Željko Širić (Croatia)

Maccabi Haifa won 5–3 on aggregate.

4 March 1999 Quarter-finals — 1st leg	Lokomotiv Moscow (Russia)	3–0	(Israel) Maccabi Haifa	Lokomotiv Stadium, Moscow
20:00	Janashia 48', 78', 90'			Attendance: 20,000; Referee: Ľuboš Micheľ (Slovakia)

5 November 1998 Quarter-finals — 2nd leg	Maccabi Haifa (Israel)	0–1	(Russia) Lokomotiv Moscow	Kiryat Eliezer Stadium, Haifa
19:00			72' (pen.) Chugainov	Attendance: 12,074; Referee: Hugh Dallas (Scotland)

Lokomotiv Moscow won 4–0 on aggregate.

=== Europa Conference League ===
==== 2023–24 ====
===== Knockout round play-offs =====
15 February 2024 Knockout round play-offs – 1st leg	Maccabi Haifa (Israel)	1–0	(Belgium) Gent	Budapest, Hungary (Note: Maccabi Haifa play their remaining home matches at a neutral venue, due to the Gaza war.)
21:00 (22:00 IDT)	Kandil (yellow card) 57'; Pierrot 65'; Feingold (yellow card) 76'	Report	(yellow card) 90+3' De Sart	Stadium: Bozsik Aréna; Attendance: 1,274; Referee: Willie Collum (SCO)

21 February 2024 Knockout round play-offs – 2nd leg	Gent (Belgium)	1–1 (1–2 agg.)	(Israel) Maccabi Haifa	Ghent, Belgium
18:00 (19:00 IDT)	Seck 69' (o.g.)	Report	4' Pierrot; (yellow card) 11' (yellow-red card) 72' Sundgren; (yellow card) 22' Saief; (yellow card) 78' Podgoreanu	Stadium: Ghelamco Arena; Attendance: 0 (Note: Due anticipated protests and crowd trouble due to the Gaza war, the game was played behind closed doors.); Referee: Matej Jug (SVN)

Maccabi Haifa won 2–1 on aggregate.

===== Round of 16 =====
7 March 2024 Round of 16 – 1st leg	Maccabi Haifa (Israel)	3–4	(Italy) Fiorentina	Budapest, Hungary (Note: Maccabi Haifa play their remaining home matches at a neutral venue, due to the Gaza war.)
21:00 (22:00 IDT)	Mohamed (yellow card) 10'; Seck 12'; Kinda 28'; Khalaily 67'; Show (yellow card) 68' (yellow-red card) 80'	Report	2' Nzola; 59' Beltrán; 73' Mandragora; (yellow card) 84' Kayode; (yellow card) 86' Milenković; 90+5' Barák	Stadium: Bozsik Aréna; Attendance: 1,589; Referee: Donatas Rumsas (LTU)

14 March 2024 Round of 16 – 2nd leg	Fiorentina (Italy)	1–1 (5–4 agg.)	(Israel) Maccabi Haifa	Florence, Italy
18:45 (19:45 IDT)	Barák 58'; Belotti (yellow card) 90+5'	Report	(yellow card) 15' Cornud; (yellow card) 87' Šimić; 78' Khalaily	Stadium: Stadio Artemio Franchi; Attendance: 6,838; Referee: Irfan Peljto (BIH)

Fiorentina won 5–4 on aggregate.

== UEFA Team Ranking ==
- Bold row-separators indicate change of ranking system.
- Italic font indicate ongoing season.

Season	Rank	T.Points	S.Points	Ref.
2025–26	95 ▲	17.000	1.500	
2024–25	98 ▼	18.000	1.500	
2023–24	91 ▲	18.000	5.000	
2022–23	113 ▲	13.000	6.000	
2021–22	167 ▲	7.000	3.000	
2020–21	250 ▲	4.500	2.500	
2019–20	262 ▲	3.925	1.500	
2018–19	282 ▼	3.725	—	
2017–18	205 ▼	4.500	—	
2016–17	176 ▼	8.375	1.850	
2015–16	144 ▼	11.725	0.450	
2014–15	140 ▼	13.200	0.275	
2013–14	102 ▲	18.375	5.150	
2012–13	128 ▼	13.575	0.650	
2011–12	123 ▼	13.400	5.200	
2010–11	93 ▲	21.400	1.925	
2009–10	100 ▲	19.775	5.450	
2008–09	106 ▼	17.050	0.350	
2007–08	101 ▼	23.197	0.7835	
2006–07	85 ▲	30.338	13.9800	
2005–06	123 ▼	19.108	0.4950	
2004–05	106 ▲	21.218	3.1960	
2003–04	109 ▼	19.012	4.7425	
2002–03	99 ▲	25.999	8.9165	
2001–02	130 ▲	18.666	4.1665	
2000–01	155 ▼	15.062	2.9165	
1999–2000	153 ▼	13.770	1.5000	
1998–99	160 ▲	12.770	8.5000	

== Records ==
=== By competition ===
Competition	P	W	D	L	GF	GA	GD	Winning %
Champions League	60	23	10	27	102	95	+7	38.33%
UEFA CUP/Europa League	60	24	16	20	81	88	-7	40%
Conference League	22	9	5	8	40	30	+10	40.91%
Cup Winners' Cup	18	9	2	7	29	22	+7	50%
Intertoto Cup	8	3	0	5	6	13	-7	37.5%
Total	168	68	33	67	265	248	+17	40.48%

=== By country of opposition ===
Country	Club	P	W	D	L	GF	GA	GD
Austria	Casino Salzburg	2	0	0	2	2	5	-3
Austria	Red Bull Salzburg	2	2	0	0	5	1	+4
Austria	Ried	2	1	0	1	5	3	+2
Austria	Sturm Graz	2	1	1	0	5	3	+2
Subtotal		8	4	1	3	17	12	+5
Azerbaijan	Khazar Lankaran	2	2	0	0	10	0	+8
Azerbaijan	Neftchi Baku	2	1	0	1	7	3	+4
Azerbaijan	Qarabağ Agdam	2	1	0	1	2	2	0
Azerbaijan	Sabah	2	1	0	1	6	6	0
Subtotal		8	5	1	2	25	11	+14
Belarus	Belshina Bobruisk	2	2	0	0	5	0	+5
Belarus	Dinamo Minsk	2	1	0	1	2	3	-1
Belarus	Slavia Mozyr	2	0	2	0	1	1	0
Belarus	Torpedo-BelAZ Zhodino	2	1	1	0	4	1	+3
Subtotal		8	4	3	1	12	5	+7
Belgium	Genk	2	1	0	1	3	3	0
Belgium	Gent	2	1	1	0	2	1	+1
Subtotal		4	2	1	1	5	4	+1
Bosnia and Herzegovina	Borac Banja Luka	2	1	0	1	7	4	+3
Bosnia and Herzegovina	Željezničar Sarajevo	1	1	0	0	3	1	+2
Subtotal		3	2	0	1	10	5	+5
Bulgaria	Litex Lovech	2	1	1	0	4	2	+2
Subtotal		2	1	1	0	4	2	+2
Cyprus	Apollon Limassol	2	1	0	1	4	2	+2
Cyprus	AEK Larnaca	2	1	0	1	2	2	0
Subtotal		4	2	0	2	6	4	+2
Czech Republic	Slavia Prague	2	1	0	1	1	1	0
Subtotal		2	1	0	1	1	1	0
England	Liverpool	2	0	1	1	2	3	-1
England	Manchester United	2	1	0	1	5	5	0
England	Tottenham Hotspur	1	0	0	1	2	7	-5
Subtotal		5	1	1	3	9	15	-6
Estonia	Nõmme Kalju	2	0	2	0	2	2	0
Subtotal		2	0	2	0	2	2	0
Faroe Islands	HB Tórshavn	2	1	0	1	7	3	+4
Faroe Islands	Klaksvíkar	2	1	0	1	6	3	+3
Subtotal		4	2	0	2	13	6	+7
Finland	Haka	2	1	0	1	1	3	-2
Subtotal		2	1	0	1	1	3	-2
France
France	Auxerre	1	1	0	0	3	1	+2
France	Bordeaux	2	0	0	2	0	2	-2
France	Paris Saint-Germain	4	1	1	2	7	13	-6
France	Rennais	2	0	0	2	0	6	-6
France	Strasbourg	2	1	0	1	3	4	-1
Subtotal		11	3	1	7	13	26	-13
(Georgia (country)) Georgia	Dinamo Tbilisi	2	2	0	0	7	2	+5
Subtotal		2	2	0	0	7	2	+5
Germany	Bayer Leverkusen	2	0	0	2	1	4	-3
Germany	Bayern Munich	2	0	0	2	0	4	-4
Germany	Schalke 04	2	0	0	2	1	6	-5
Germany	Union Berlin	2	0	0	2	0	4	-4
Subtotal		8	0	0	8	2	18	-16
Greece	AEK Athens	2	0	0	2	1	8	-7
Greece	Olympiacos	4	2	2	0	11	4	+7
Greece	Panathinaikos	2	1	1	0	2	1	+1
Greece	PAOK Thessaloniki	2	0	1	1	2	3	-1
Subtotal		10	3	4	3	16	16	0
Italy	Fiorentina	2	0	1	1	4	5	-1
Italy	Juventus	4	1	0	3	3	5	-2
Italy	Livorno	1	0	1	0	1	1	0
Italy	Parma	2	1	0	1	1	1	0
Subtotal		9	2	2	5	9	12	-3
Kazakhstan	Aktobe	2	1	1	0	4	3	+1
Kazakhstan	Kairat Almaty	3	1	1	1	3	4	-1
Kazakhstan	Shakhter Karagandy	2	1	1	0	4	3	+1
Subtotal		7	3	3	1	11	10	+1
Latvia	Ventspils	2	1	1	0	3	0	+3
Subtotal		2	1	1	0	3	0	+3
Luxembourg	Dudelange	2	2	0	0	7	1	+6
Subtotal		2	2	0	0	7	1	+6
Malta	Ħamrun Spartans	2	2	0	0	6	1	+5
Subtotal		2	2	0	0	6	1	+5
Moldova	Sheriff Tiraspol	2	1	0	1	4	2	+2
Subtotal		2	1	0	1	4	2	+2
Netherlands	Alkmaar	2	0	0	2	0	3	-3
Netherlands	Feyenoord	2	0	1	1	1	2	-1
Netherlands	Vitesse	2	1	0	1	2	4	-2
Subtotal		6	1	1	4	3	8	-5
Northern Ireland	Glentoran	4	4	0	0	13	1	+12
Subtotal		4	4	0	0	13	1	+12
Norway	Rosenborg	2	0	0	2	3	5	-2
Subtotal		2	0	0	2	3	5	-2
Portugal	Benfica Lisbon	2	0	0	2	1	8	-7
Portugal	Sporting CP	2	0	1	1	0	4	-4
Subtotal		4	0	1	3	1	12	-11
Poland	Raków Częstochowa	2	1	0	1	1	2	-1
Subtotal		2	1	0	1	1	2	-1
Romania	Astra Giurgiu	2	1	1	0	3	1	+2
Romania	Gloria Bistrița	2	1	0	1	2	2	0
Romania	Steaua București	2	1	0	1	7	4	+3
Subtotal		6	3	1	2	12	7	+5
Russia	CSKA Moscow	2	1	1	0	1	0	+1
Russia	Torpedo Moscow	2	1	0	1	3	2	+1
Russia	Lokomotiv Moscow	2	0	0	2	0	4	-4
Russia	Lokomotiv Nizhny Novgorod	1	0	0	1	0	4	-4
Russia	Rostov	1	1	0	1	2	1	+1
Subtotal		8	3	1	4	6	11	-5
Scotland	Rangers	1	0	0	1	0	2	-2
Subtotal		1	0	0	1	0	2	-2
Serbia / (Federal Republic of Yugoslavia) FR Yugoslavia	Partizan Belgrade	3	1	0	2	2	4	-2
Serbia / (Federal Republic of Yugoslavia) FR Yugoslavia	Proleter Zrenjanin	1	0	0	1	0	4	-4
Serbia / (Federal Republic of Yugoslavia) FR Yugoslavia	Red Star Belgrade	2	1	1	0	5	4	+1
Subtotal		6	2	1	3	7	12	-5
Slovakia	Slovan Bratislava	2	2	0	0	5	2	+3
Subtotal		2	2	0	0	5	2	+3
Slovenia	Maribor	2	1	1	0	3	2	+1
Slovenia	Mura	2	2	0	0	5	2	+3
Slovenia	Publikum	3	1	1	1	4	4	0
Subtotal		7	4	2	1	12	8	+4
Spain	Espanyol	2	0	1	1	0	4	-4
Spain	Valencia	2	0	1	1	0	4	-4
Spain	Villarreal	2	0	1	1	1	2	-1
Subtotal		6	0	3	3	1	10	-9
Sweden	Malmö	2	0	1	1	4	5	-1
Subtotal		2	0	1	1	4	5	-1
Switzerland	Young Boys	2	0	1	1	0	3	-3
Subtotal		2	0	1	1	0	3	-3
Turkey	Antalyaspor	1	1	0	0	2	0	+2
Subtotal		1	1	0	0	2	0	+2
Ukraine	Dnipro Dnipropetrovsk	2	1	0	1	1	2	-1
Subtotal		2	1	0	1	1	2	-1
Wales	Cwmbrân Town	2	2	0	0	6	0	+6
Subtotal		2	2	0	0	6	0	+6

=== Performances ===
- Champions League : 3rd place at Group stage (2002–03)
- Europa League : 3rd place at Group stage (2011–12, 2013–14, 2023–24)
- UEFA CUP : Round of 16 (2006–07)
- Europa Conference League : Preliminary knockout round (2023–24)
- Cup Winners' Cup : Quarter-finals (1998–99)
- UEFA Intertoto Cup : 1st place at Group stage (1985)

=== Wins ===
- Largest win at Champions League Qualifying : (Northern Ireland) 6–0 vs Glentoran (2009–10 Second qualifying round)
- Largest win at Champions League Group stage : 3–0 vs (Greece) Olympiacos (2002–03 First Group stage), (England) 3–0 vs Manchester United (2002–23 First Group stage)
- Largest win at Europa League Qualifying : 8–0 vs (Azerbaijan) Khazar Lankaran (2013–14 Second qualifying round)
- Largest win at Europa League Group stage : (Romania) 5–0 vs Steaua București (2011–12 Group stage)
- Largest win at UEFA CUP Qualifying : (Wales) 3–0 vs Cwmbrân Town (2003–04 Qualifying round)
- Largest win at UEFA CUP Group stage : (France) 3–1 vs Auxerre (2006–07 Group stage)
- Largest win at UEFA CUP knockout phases : (Russia) 1–0 vs CSKA Moscow (2006–07 Round of 32)
- Largest win at Europa Conference League Qualifying : (Faroe Islands) 7–2 vs HB Tórshavn (2021–22 Third qualifying round)
- Largest win at Europa Conference League Group stage : (Czech Republic) 1–0 vs Slavia Prague (2021–22 Group stage)
- Largest win at Europa Conference League knockout phases : (Belgium) 1–0 vs Gent (2023–24 Knockout round play-offs)
- Largest win at Cup Winners' Cup : (Faroe Islands) 4–0 vs KÍ Klaksvík (1995–96 Qualifying round)
- Largest win at UEFA Intertoto Cup : 2–0 vs (Turkey) Antalyaspor (1997 Group stage), 2–0 vs (Romania) Gloria Bistrița (2007 UEFA Intertoto Cup)

=== Defeats ===
- Biggest defeats at Champions League Qualifying : (Switzerland) 0–3 vs Young Boys (2023–24 Play-off round)
- Biggest defeats at Champions League Group stage : (France) 2–7 vs Paris Saint-Germain (2022–23 Group stage), (Portugal) 1–6 vs Benfica Lisbon (2022–23 Group stage)
- Biggest defeats at Europa League (England) Qualifying : 2–7 vs Tottenham Hotspur (2021–22 Play-off round)
- Biggest defeats at Europa League Group stage : (Germany) 0–3 vs Schalke 04 (2011–12 Group stage), (France) 0–3 (Twice) vs Stade Rennais (2023–24 Group stage)
- Biggest defeats at UEFA CUP Qualifying : 0–4 vs (Spain) Valencia (2003–04 Second round
- Biggest defeats at UEFA CUP Final phase : 0–4 vs (Greece) AEK Athens (2002–03 Third round, 0–4 vs (Spain) Espanyol (2006–07 Round of 16
- Biggest defeats at Europa Conference League (Faroe Islands) Qualifying : 0–1 vs HB Tórshavn (2021–22 Third qualifying round)
- Biggest defeats at Europa Conference League Group stage : (Germany) 0–3 vs Union Berlin (2021–22 Group stage)
- Biggest defeats at Cup Winners' Cup : (Portugal) 0–4 vs Sporting CP (1995–96 Qualifying round)
- Biggest defeats at UEFA Intertoto Cup : (Socialist Federal Republic of Yugoslavia) 0–4 vs Proleter Zrenjanin (1997 Group stage), (Russia) 0–4 vs Lokomotiv Nizhny Novgorod (1997 Group stage)

== Achievements in Europe ==
Season	Achievement	Notes
UEFA Champions League
2002–03	Group stage	eliminated by Manchester United, Bayer Leverkusen ahead Olympiacos
2009–10	Group stage	eliminated by Bordeaux, Bayern Munich, Juventus
2022–23	Group stage	eliminated by Benfica, Paris Saint-Germain, Juventus
UEFA Europa League
2011–12	Group stage	eliminated by Schalke 04, Steaua București ahead AEK Larnaca
2013–14	Group stage	eliminated by AZ Alkmaar, PAOK Thessaloniki ahead Shakhter Karagandy
2023–24	Group stage	eliminated by Villarreal, Stade Rennais ahead Panathinaikos
UEFA Cup
2002–03	Third round	eliminated by AEK Athens
2006–07	Round of 16	eliminated by Espanyol
UEFA Winners' Cup
1993–94	Second round	eliminated by Parma
1998–99	Quarter-finals	eliminated by Lokomotiv Moscow
UEFA Europa Conference League
2021–22	Group stage	eliminated by Slavia Prague, Feynoord, Union Berlin
2023–24	Round of 16	eliminated by ACF Fiorentina

== Statistics ==
=== Scorers ===
Rank	Name	UCL	UEL/UEC	UECL	CWC	UIC	Total
1	(Israel) Alon Mizrahi				15		15
2-3	(Israel) Yaniv Katan	5	7				12
2-3	(Haiti) Frantzdy Pierrot	10		2			12
4	(Georgia (country)) Vladimir Dvalishvili	9	2				11
5	(Suriname) Tjaronn Chery	5	3	2			10
6	(Israel) Dean David	4	1	4			9
7-8	(Israel) Omer Atzili	3		5			8
7-8	(Israel) Yuval Ashkenazi		5	3			8
9	(Nigeria) Yakubu Ayegbeni	7					7
10-14	(Israel) Eyal Golasa	4	2				6
10-14	(Israel) Weaam Amasha	4	2				6
10-14	(Argentina) (Israel) Roberto Colautti	1	5				6
10-14	(Spain) Rubén Rayos		6				6
10-14	(Australia) (Israel) Nikita Rukavytsya		6				6
15-17	(Croatia) (Israel) Giovanni Rosso	3	2				5
15-17	(Israel) Walid Badir	3	2				5
15-17	(Senegal) Abdoulaye Seck	2	1	2			5
18-20	(Israel) Mohammad Ghadir	3	1				4
18-20	(Israel) Alon Turgeman		4				4
18-20	(Israel) Dolev Haziza	1		3			4
21-30	(Israel) Rafi Cohen	3					3
21-30	(Israel) Shlomi Arbeitman	3					3
21-30	(Brazil) (Israel) Gustavo Boccoli	3					3
21-30	(Israel) Idan Vered	1	2				3
21-30	(Israel) Mohammad Abu Fani	1	1	1			3
21-30	(Israel) Haim Revivo	1	1		1		3
21-30	(Israel) Adoram Keisi	1			2		3
21-30	(Israel) Anan Khalaily	1				2	3
21-30	(Israel) Hen Ezra		3				3
21-30	(Israel) Shimon Abuhatzira		3				3
31-44	(Croatia) Nenad Pralija	2					2
31-44	(Nigeria) Yero Bello	2					2
31-44	(Israel) (Nigeria) Dela Yampolsky	2					2
31-44	(Niger) (Israel) Ali Mohamed	2					2
31-44	(Germany) Erik Shuranov	2					2
31-44	(Israel) Dia Saba	2		1			3
31-44	(Israel) Avishai Jano	1	1				2
31-44	(Israel) Idan Tal		2				2
31-44	(Israel) Michael Zandberg		2				2
31-44	(Democratic Republic of the Congo) Alain Masudi		2				2
31-44	(Israel) Mohammed Awaed		2				2
31-44	(Israel) Reuven Atar		1		1		2
31-44	(Israel) Ofer Shitrit				2		2
31-44	(Israel) Yossi Benayoun				2		2
45-82	(Israel) Alon Hazan	1					1
45-82	(Nigeria) Oluwasegun Abiodun	1					1
45-82	(Lithuania) Raimondas Žutautas	1					1
45-82	(Israel) Lior Refaelov	1					1
45-82	(South Africa) Peter Masilela	1					1
45-82	(Sweden) Daniel Sundgren	1					1
45-82	(Israel) Mahmoud Jaber	1					1
45-82	(Paraguay) Dante López		1				1
45-82	(Brazil) Xavier Dirceu		1				1
45-82	(Brazil) Xavier Anderson		1				1
45-82	(Israel) Taleb Tawatha		1				1
45-82	(Israel) Eyal Meshumar		1				1
45-82	(Croatia) Jurica Buljat		1				1
45-82	(South Africa) Dino Ndlovu		1				1
45-82	(Israel) Shoval Gozlan		1				1
45-82	(Israel) Gili Vermouth		1				1
45-82	(Israel) Maxim Plakuschenko		1				1
45-82	(Israel) Yarden Shua		1				1
45-82	(Israel) Maor Levi			1			1
45-82	(Israel) Rami Gershon			1			1
45-82	(Israel) Ben Sahar			1			1
45-82	(Israel) Sun Menahem			1			1
45-82	(Ghana) Godsway Donyoh			1			1
45-82	(Israel) Gadi Kinda				1		1
45-82	(Ukraine) Serhiy Kandaurov				1		1
45-82	(Israel) Ronny Levy				1		1
45-82	(Israel) Alon Harazi				1		1
45-82	(Ukraine) Roman Pets				1		1
45-82	(Israel) Shay Holtzman				1		1
45-82	(Bosnia and Herzegovina) Ibrahim Duro				1		1
45-82	(Israel) Idan Shum					1	1
45-82	(Israel) Ayman Khalakhla					1	1
45-82	(Israel) Erez Mesika					1	1
45-82	(Israel) Arik Benado					1	1
45-82	(Israel) Shai Maimon					1	1
45-82	(Israel) Tomer Hemed					1	1
45-82	(Jamaica) Trivante Stewart			1			1
45-82	(Israel) Ethan Azoulay			1			1
Own goal		2	1	1			4
