= 2009–10 Maccabi Haifa F.C. season =

Maccabi Haifa
2009–10 season
- Chairman: Ya'akov Shahar
- Manager: Elisha Levy
- Stadium: Kiryat Eliezer Stadium
- Israeli Premier League: 2nd
- Israel State Cup: Round of 16
- Toto Cup Al: Semi-finals
- UEFA Champions League: Group stage
Home colours	Away colours	Third colours

The 2009–10 season was Maccabi Haifa Football Club's 28th consecutive season in the Israeli Premier League and 96th year in existence as a football club. In addition to the domestic league, Maccabi Haifa participated in this season's editions of the Israel State Cup, Toto Cup Al and UEFA Champions League.

== Squad ==
Note: Flags indicate national team as defined under FIFA eligibility rules; some limited exceptions apply. Players may hold more than one non-FIFA nationality.

No.	Pos.	Nation	Player
1	GK	ISR	Nir Davidovich
3	DF	ISR	Alon Harazi
4	DF	ISR	Shai Maimon
5	DF	POR	Jorge Teixeira
6	FW	ARG	Eial Strahman
7	MF	BRA	Gustavo Boccoli
8	MF	COL	Jhon Culma
9	FW	GEO	Vladimir Dvalishvili
11	FW	NGR	Yero Bello
13	DF	ISR	Taleb Tawatha
15	MF	ISR	Eyal Golasa
16	FW	ISR	Mohammad Ghadir

No.	Pos.	Nation	Player
17	DF	RSA	Tsepo Masilela
19	FW	ISR	Shlomi Arbeitman
20	FW	ISR	Yaniv Katan
21	DF	ISR	Dekel Keinan
22	GK	ISR	Amir Edri
23	MF	ISR	Beram Kayal
24	MF	ISR	Yisrael Zaguri
25	MF	ISR	Shlomi Azulay
26	MF	ISR	Lior Refaelov
27	DF	ISR	Eyal Meshumar
28	MF	ISR	Sintayehu Sallalich
44	GK	ISR	Haim Ziskind

== Competitions ==
=== Overview ===
Competition	First match	Last match	Starting round	Final position	Record							
Competition	First match	Last match	Starting round	Final position	Pld	W	D	L	GF	GA	GD	Win %
Israeli Premier League	22 August 2009	15 May 2010	Matchday 1	2nd	35	28	3	4	72	16	+56	80.00
Israel State Cup	9 February 2010	24 March 2010	Eighth round	Round of 16	2	1	0	1	6	2	+4	50.00
Toto Cup Al	1 August 2009	13 January 2010	Group stage	Semi-finals	8	3	3	2	9	7	+2	37.50
UEFA Champions League	15 July 2009	8 December 2009	Second qualifying round	Group stage	12	5	1	6	19	12	+7	41.67
Total					57	37	7	13	106	37	+69	64.91

Source: Competitions

=== Israeli Premier League ===
==== League table ====
Pos	Team	Pld	W	D	L	GF	GA	GD	Pts	Qualification
1	Maccabi Haifa	30	25	2	3	64	12	+52	77	Qualification for the championship round
2	Hapoel Tel Aviv	30	21	8	1	79	25	+54	71	Qualification for the championship round
3	Maccabi Tel Aviv	30	15	7	8	47	33	+14	52	Qualification for the championship round
4	Beitar Jerusalem	30	13	7	10	46	34	+12	46	Qualification for the championship round
5	Bnei Yehuda	30	12	9	9	37	30	+7	45 (Note: F.C. Ashdod received a technical loss of 3–0 to Bnei Yehuda for fielding an ineligible player. The original game finished in a 1–1 draw.)	Qualification for the championship round

Source: Israel Football Association
Rules for classification: 1st points; 2nd goal difference; 3rd matches won; 4th goals scored; 5th head-to-head; 6th decision match.
Notes:

Pos	Team	Pld	W	D	L	GF	GA	GD	Pts	Qualification
1	Hapoel Tel Aviv (C)	35	25	9	1	87	26	+61	49	Qualification for the Champions League second qualifying round
2	Maccabi Haifa	35	28	3	4	72	16	+56	49	Qualification for the Europa League third qualifying round
3	Maccabi Tel Aviv	35	17	9	9	52	35	+17	34	Qualification for the Europa League second qualifying round
4	Bnei Yehuda	35	14	11	10	43	34	+9	31	Qualification for the Europa League first qualifying round (Note: As Hapoel Tel Aviv won both League and 2009–10 Israel State Cup, the State Cup finalists Bnei Yehuda received the final Europa League spot.)
5	Beitar Jerusalem	35	14	7	14	50	44	+6	26	
6	F.C. Ironi Ashdod	35	11	10	14	36	45	−9	22	

Source: Israel Football Association
Rules for classification: 1st points; 2nd goal difference; 3rd matches won; 4th goals scored; 5th head-to-head; 6th decision match.
(C) Champions

==== Results summary ====
Overall								Home						Away					
Pld	W	D	L	GF	GA	GD	Pts	W	D	L	GF	GA	GD	W	D	L	GF	GA	GD
35	28	3	4	72	16	+56	87	15	2	1	35	8	+27	13	1	3	37	8	+29

Source: Competitions

==== Matches ====
22 August 2009 1	Maccabi Haifa	2–1	Hapoel Acre	Haifa
19:30 IDT (UTC+3)	Katan 35'; Arbeitman 89'	Report	Elmaliach (yellow card) 36', (goal) 66'; Razak (yellow card) 60' (yellow-red card) 72'	Stadium: Kiryat Eliezer Stadium; Referee: Menashe Masiah

29 August 2009 2	Hapoel Ra'anana	1–3	Maccabi Haifa	Kfar Saba
17:00 IDT (UTC+3)	For 58'	Report	Arbeitman 66', 81'; Dvalishvili 87'	Stadium: Levita Stadium; Referee: Liran Wachsberger

12 September 2009 3	Maccabi Haifa	3–1	Hapoel Ramat Gan	Haifa
17:00 IDT (UTC+3)	Golasa 29'; Dvalishvili 45'; Arbeitman 81'	Report	Kovačević 17'	Stadium: Kiryat Eliezer Stadium; Referee: Moshe Bohbot

21 September 2009 4	Hapoel Tel Aviv	1–2	Maccabi Haifa	Tel Aviv
20:00 IDT (UTC+3)	Shechter 36'	Report	Katan 2' (pen.); Golasa 25'	Stadium: Bloomfield Stadium; Referee: Menashe Masiah

3 October 2009 5	Maccabi Haifa	2–0	Maccabi Petah Tikva	Haifa
20:40 IDT (UTC+3)	Arbeitman 64'; Dvalishvili 71'	Report		Stadium: Kiryat Eliezer Stadium; Referee: Alon Yefet

17 October 2009 6	Hapoel Be'er Sheva	1–3	Maccabi Haifa	Be’er Sheva
20:30 IDT (UTC+3)	Kadousi 18'	Report	Dvalishvili 10', 65'; Arbeitman 27'	Stadium: Vasermil Stadium; Referee: Asaf Kenan

26 October 2009 7	Maccabi Haifa	2–1	Beitar Jerusalem	Haifa
20:00 IST (UTC+2)	Ghadir 40'; Dvalishvili 54'	Report	Vered 15'	Stadium: Kiryat Eliezer Stadium; Referee: Alon Yefet

31 October 2009 8	Maccabi Haifa	2–0	Maccabi Netanya	Haifa
17:10 IST (UTC+2)	Arbeitman 69', 90+1'	Report		Stadium: Kiryat Eliezer Stadium; Referee: Menashe Masiah

9 November 2009 9	Ashdod	0–1	Maccabi Haifa	Ashdod
20:00 IST (UTC+2)		Report	Arbeitman 50'	Stadium: Yud-Alef Stadium; Referee: Eytan Tbryzy

21 November 2009 10	Maccabi Haifa	4–1	Maccabi Akhi Nazareth	Haifa
17:10 IST (UTC+2)	Katan 3' (pen.); Dvalishvili 18'; Arbeitman 38'; B. Kayal 51'	Report	L. Kayal 84'	Stadium: Kiryat Eliezer Stadium; Referee: Daniel Bar Natan

30 November 2009 11	Maccabi Tel Aviv	1–0	Maccabi Haifa	Tel Aviv
20:00 IST (UTC+2)	Mayuka 5'	Report		Stadium: Bloomfield Stadium; Referee: Eli Hacmon

5 December 2009 12	Maccabi Haifa	1–0	Bnei Sakhnin	Haifa
17:10 IST (UTC+2)	Arbeitman 77'	Report		Stadium: Kiryat Eliezer Stadium; Referee: Menashe Masiah

12 December 2009 13	Hapoel Petah Tikva	0–4	Maccabi Haifa	Petah Tikva
19:30 IST (UTC+2)		Report	Golasa 28'; Refaelov 31'; Arbeitman 42', 60'	Stadium: Petah Tikva Municipal Stadium; Referee: Eytan Tbryzy

20 December 2009 14	Maccabi Haifa	2–0	Bnei Yehuda Tel Aviv	Haifa
20:00 IST (UTC+2)	Arbeitman 1'; Golasa 83'	Report		Stadium: Kiryat Eliezer Stadium; Referee: Liran Liany

28 December 2009 15	Hapoel Haifa	0–1	Maccabi Haifa	Haifa
20:00 IST (UTC+2)	Dora (yellow card) 10' (yellow-red card) 90+1'; Tartazky (yellow card) 57'; Kiwan (yellow card) 61'; Abukarat (yellow card) 74'	Report	Keinan (yellow card) 11'; Golasa 32', (yellow card) 33'; Meshumar (yellow card) 57'; Teixeira (yellow card) 74'; Masilela (yellow card) 82'; B. Kayal (yellow card) 85'	Stadium: Kiryat Eliezer Stadium; Referee: Alon Yefet

2 January 2010 16	Hapoel Acre	0–3	Maccabi Haifa	Acre
17:15 IST (UTC+2)	Binyamin (yellow card) 25'	Report	Katan (yellow card) 25', (goal) 34'; Ghadir (yellow card) 40'; Dvalishvili 43', 44'	Stadium: Napoleon Stadium; Referee: Liran Wachsberger

9 January 2010 17	Maccabi Haifa	3–0	Hapoel Ra'anana	Haifa
19:00 IST (UTC+2)	Dvalishvili 35', 44'; Refaelov 46'	Report		Stadium: Kiryat Eliezer Stadium; Referee: Liran Liany

16 January 2010 18	Hapoel Ramat Gan	0–5	Maccabi Haifa	Givatayim
17:10 IST (UTC+2)		Report	Refaelov 7', 57'; Dvalishvili 10', 40'; Arbeitman 70'	Stadium: HaMakhtesh Stadium; Referee: Meir Levi

25 January 2010 19	Maccabi Haifa	0–0	Hapoel Tel Aviv	Haifa
20:00 IST (UTC+2)		Report		Stadium: Kiryat Eliezer Stadium; Referee: Eytan Tbryzy

1 February 2010 20	Maccabi Petah Tikva	0–1	Maccabi Haifa	Petah Tikva
20:00 IST (UTC+2)		Report	Dvalishvili 72'	Stadium: Petah Tikva Municipal Stadium; Referee: Eitan Shmuelevich

6 February 2010 21	Maccabi Haifa	4–1	Hapoel Be'er Sheva	Haifa
17:15 IST (UTC+2)	Arbeitman 19', 35', 46'; Masilela 87'	Report	Melikson 58'	Stadium: Kiryat Eliezer Stadium; Referee: Shai Shitrit

14 February 2010 22	Beitar Jerusalem	0–3	Maccabi Haifa	Jerusalem
20:00 IST (UTC+2)		Report	Ghadir 45'; Arbeitman 51'; Boccoli 88'	Stadium: Teddi Malha Stadium; Referee: Asaf Kenan

20 February 2010 23	Maccabi Netanya	1–0	Maccabi Haifa	Netanya
19:30 IST (UTC+2)	Menashe 68'	Report		Stadium: Sar-Tov Stadium; Referee: Menashe Masiah

28 February 2010 24	Maccabi Haifa	1–0	Ashdod	Haifa
20:00 IST (UTC+2)	Ghadir 88'	Report		Stadium: Kiryat Eliezer Stadium; Referee: Eitan Shmuelevich

6 March 2010 25	Maccabi Akhi Nazareth	0–5	Maccabi Haifa	Ilut
17:00 IST (UTC+2)		Report	Arbeitman 9' (pen.), 16', 34'; Katan 23'; Refaelov 43'	Stadium: Ilut Stadium; Referee: Meir Levi

15 March 2010 26	Maccabi Haifa	1–0	Maccabi Tel Aviv	Haifa
20:00 IST (UTC+2)	Arbeitman 83' (pen.)	Report		Stadium: Kiryat Eliezer Stadium; Referee: Manuel Gräfe (Germany)

21 March 2010 27	Bnei Sakhnin	2–1	Maccabi Haifa	Sakhnin
20:00 IST (UTC+2)	Cohen 28'; Ganayem 62'	Report	Arbeitman 87' (pen.)	Stadium: Doha Stadium; Referee: Alon Yefet

28 March 2010 28	Maccabi Haifa	3–0	Hapoel Petah Tikva	Haifa
20:00 IDT (UTC+3)	Katan 1'; Arbeitman 29'; Refaelov 53'	Report		Stadium: Kiryat Eliezer Stadium; Referee: Liran Liany

5 April 2010 29	Bnei Yehuda Tel Aviv	0–2	Maccabi Haifa	Tel Aviv
20:00 IDT (UTC+3)		Report	Arbeitman 16'; Katan 60' (pen.)	Stadium: Bloomfield Stadium; Referee: Eli Hacmon

10 April 2010 30	Maccabi Haifa	0–0	Hapoel Haifa	Haifa
17:20 IDT (UTC+3)	Ottman (yellow card) 68'; Dvalishvili (yellow card) 72'	Report	Abukarat (yellow card) 23'; Tartazky (yellow card) 68'; Roash (yellow card) 72'; Levi (yellow card) 75'; Cohen (yellow card) 82'	Stadium: Kiryat Eliezer Stadium; Referee: Asaf Kenan

==== Top Playoff ====
17 April 2010 31	Maccabi Haifa	3–1	Ashdod	Haifa
21:00 IDT (UTC+3)	Boccoli 44'; Dvalishvili 46'; Arbeitman 90'	Report	Sade 89' (pen.)	Stadium: Kiryat Eliezer Stadium; Referee: Liran Liany

26 April 2010 32	Maccabi Haifa	0–1	Hapoel Tel Aviv	Haifa
20:00 IDT (UTC+3)		Report	Lala 59'	Stadium: Kiryat Eliezer Stadium; Referee: Alon Yefet

3 May 2010 33	Maccabi Tel Aviv	0–2	Maccabi Haifa	Tel Aviv
20:00 IDT (UTC+3)		Report	Arbeitman 10'; Refaelov 41'	Stadium: Bloomfield Stadium; Referee: Meir Levi

8 May 2010 34	Maccabi Haifa	2–1	Beitar Jerusalem	Haifa
20:00 IDT (UTC+3)	Dvalishvili 11'; Keinan 86'	Report	Benado 21'	Stadium: Kiryat Eliezer Stadium; Referee: Asaf Kenan

15 May 2010 35	Bnei Yehuda Tel Aviv	1–1	Maccabi Haifa	Tel Aviv
20:00 IDT (UTC+3)	Zhairi 50'	Report	Teixeira 75'	Stadium: Bloomfield Stadium; Referee: Meir Levi

=== Israel State Cup ===
9 February 2010 Eighth round	Maccabi Haifa	5–0	Hapoel Kfar Saba	Haifa
19:00 IST (UTC+2)		Report		Stadium: Kiryat Eliezer Stadium

24 March 2010 Round of 16	Hapoel Ramat Gan	2–1 (a.e.t.)	Maccabi Haifa	Ramat Gan
19:00 IST (UTC+2)	Golan 85'; Datoru 97'	Report	Meshumar 43'	Stadium: Ramat Gan Stadium

=== Toto Cup Al ===
==== Group stage ====
Pos	Team	Pld	W	D	L	GF	GA	GD	Pts	Qualification	HPT	MHA	MPT	HBS
1	Hapoel Petah Tikva	6	3	2	1	8	6	+2	11	Advance to knockout phase		1–1	3–1	1–1
2	Maccabi Haifa	6	2	3	1	5	3	+2	9	Advance to knockout phase	3–1		1–0	0–0
3	Maccabi Petah Tikva	6	2	1	3	7	8	−1	7		0–1	1–0		1–1
4	Hapoel Be'er Sheva	6	0	4	2	4	7	−3	4		0–1	0–0	2–4	

Source: football.org.il (in Hebrew)
Legend: Blue = home team win; Yellow = draw; Red = away team win.
Rules for classification: 1st points; 2nd goal difference; 3rd matches won; 4th goals scored; 5th head-to-head; 6th decision match

1 August 2009 1	Maccabi Haifa	1–0	Maccabi Petah Tikva	Haifa
19:30 IDT (UTC+3)		Report		Stadium: Kiryat Eliezer Stadium

15 August 2009 2	Hapoel Petah Tikva	1–1	Maccabi Haifa	Petah Tikva
17:00 IDT (UTC+3)		Report		Stadium: Petah Tikva Municipal Stadium

23 September 2009 3	Maccabi Haifa	3–1	Hapoel Petah Tikva	Haifa
19:00 IDT (UTC+3)		Report		Stadium: Kiryat Eliezer Stadium

11 November 2009 4	Maccabi Haifa	0–0	Hapoel Be'er Sheva	Haifa
21:00 IST (UTC+2)		Report		Stadium: Kiryat Eliezer Stadium

16 November 2009 5	Hapoel Be'er Sheva	0–0	Maccabi Haifa	Be’er Sheva
17:00 IST (UTC+2)		Report		Stadium: Vasermil Stadium

15 December 2009 6	Maccabi Petah Tikva	1–0	Maccabi Haifa	Petah Tikva
17:00 IST (UTC+2)		Report		Stadium: Petah Tikva Municipal Stadium

==== Knockout phase ====
23 December 2009 Quarter-finals	Maccabi Haifa	2–1	Hapoel Petah Tikva	Haifa
18:00 IST (UTC+2)		Report		Stadium: Kiryat Eliezer Stadium

13 January 2010 Semi-finals	Hapoel Ra'anana	3–2	Maccabi Haifa	Kfar Saba
17:30 IST (UTC+2)		Report		Stadium: Levita Stadium

=== UEFA Champions League ===
==== Second qualifying round ====
15 July 2009 First leg	Maccabi Haifa (Israel)	6–0	(Northern Ireland) Glentoran	Haifa, Israel
20:50 IDT (UTC+3)	Refaelov 36'; Katan 52'; Dvalishvili 57', 81'; Arbeitman 83'; Ghadir 89'	Report	Clarke (yellow card) 21'; Black (yellow card) 62'	Stadium: Kiryat Eliezer Stadium; Attendance: 8,256; Referee: Aleksei Nikolaev (Russia)

22 July 2009 Second leg	Glentoran (Northern Ireland)	0–4 (0–10 agg.)	(Israel) Maccabi Haifa	Belfast, Northern Ireland
18:50 BST (UTC+1)		Report	Bello 9', 53'; Culma (yellow card) 17'; Golasa (yellow card) 24'; Masilela 62'; Arbeitman 90+2'	Stadium: The Oval; Attendance: 872; Referee: Espen Berntsen (Norway)
Note: Maccabi Haifa won 10–0 on aggregate.

==== Third qualifying round ====
28 July 2009 First leg	Aktobe (Kazakhstan)	0–0	(Israel) Maccabi Haifa	Aktobe, Kazakhstan
21:00 Time in Kazakhstan (UTC+6)		Report	Teixeira (yellow card) 52'	Stadium: Aktobe Central Stadium; Attendance: 12,800; Referee: Thomas Einwaller (Austria)

4 August 2009 Second leg	Maccabi Haifa (Israel)	4–3 (4–3 agg.)	(Kazakhstan) Aktobe	Haifa, Israel
20:50 IDT (UTC+3)	Refaelov (yellow card) 24'; Katan 26'; Golasa 34'; Keinan (yellow card) 56'; Dvalishvili 59', 62'; Davidovich (yellow card) 76'; Teixeira (yellow card) 84'	Report	Averchenko 8'; Chichulin 13', (yellow card) 89'; Khairullin 15'; Golovskoy (yellow card) 38'	Stadium: Kiryat Eliezer Stadium; Attendance: 8,945; Referee: Serge Gumienny (Belgium)
Note: Maccabi Haifa won 4–3 on aggregate.

==== Play-off round ====
19 August 2009 First leg	Red Bull Salzburg (Austria)	1–2	(Israel) Maccabi Haifa	Wals-Siezenheim, Austria
20:45 CEST (UTC+2)	Augustinussen (yellow card) 56'; Zickler 57'; Schwegler (yellow card) 66'	Report	Meshumar (yellow card) 17'; Ghadir 22'; Keinan (yellow card) 72'; Arbeitman 84'; Masilela (yellow card) 88'	Stadium: Red Bull Arena; Attendance: 21,260; Referee: Yuri Baskakov (Russia)

25 August 2009 Second leg	Maccabi Haifa (Israel)	3–0 (5–1 agg.)	(Austria) Red Bull Salzburg	Ramat Gan, Israel (Note: The match was played at the Ramat Gan Stadium in Tel Aviv District, instead of Maccabi Haifa regular stadium, the Kiryat Eliezer Stadium in Haifa, which did not meet UEFA requirements.)
21:45 IDT (UTC+3)	Culma (yellow card) 22'; B. Kayal (yellow card) 25'; Dvalishvili 31'; Golasa 57'; Ghadir 90'	Report	Cziommer (yellow card) 21'	Stadium: Ramat Gan Stadium; Attendance: 31,700; Referee: Bertrand Layec (France)
Note: Maccabi Haifa won 5–1 on aggregate.

==== Group stage ====
Pos	Team	Pld	W	D	L	GF	GA	GD	Pts	Qualification	BOR	BAY	JUV	MHA
1	(France) Bordeaux	6	5	1	0	9	2	+7	16	Advance to knockout phase	—	2–1	2–0	1–0
2	(Germany) Bayern Munich	6	3	1	2	9	5	+4	10	Advance to knockout phase	0–2	—	0–0	1–0
3	(Italy) Juventus	6	2	2	2	4	7	−3	8	Transfer to Europa League	1–1	1–4	—	1–0
4	(Israel) Maccabi Haifa	6	0	0	6	0	8	−8	0		0–1	0–3	0–1	—

Source: RSSSF

15 September 2009 1	Maccabi Haifa (Israel)	0–3	(Germany) Bayern Munich	Ramat Gan, Israel
21:45 IDT (UTC+3)	Boccoli (yellow card) 80'	Report	Ribéry (yellow card) 48'; Van Buyten 64'; Lahm (yellow card) 84'; Müller 85', 88'	Stadium: Ramat Gan Stadium; Attendance: 38,789; Referee: Damir Skomina (Slovenia)

30 September 2009 2	Bordeaux (France)	1–0	(Israel) Maccabi Haifa	Bordeaux, France
20:45 CEST (UTC+2)	Planus (yellow card) 38'; Ciani 83'	Report	Meshumar (yellow card) 66'; B. Kayal (red card) 88'	Stadium: Stade Chaban-Delmas; Attendance: 28,748; Referee: Eric Braamhaar (Netherlands)

21 October 2009 3	Juventus (Italy)	1–0	(Israel) Maccabi Haifa	Turin, Italy
20:45 CEST (UTC+2)	Chiellini 47'	Report	Culma (yellow card) 11'; Teixeira (yellow card) 31'; Osman (yellow card) 38'; Zaguri (yellow card) 51'; Dutra (red card) 68'; Boccoli (yellow card) 90'	Stadium: Stadio Olimpico Grande Torino; Attendance: 21,303; Referee: Olegário Benquerença (Portugal)

3 November 2009 4	Maccabi Haifa (Israel)	0–1	(Italy) Juventus	Ramat Gan, Israel
21:45 IST (UTC+2)	Masilela (yellow card) 26'; Culma (yellow card) 36'; Osman (yellow card) 71'	Report	Melo (yellow card) 36'; Camoranesi 45+2'	Stadium: Ramat Gan Stadium; Attendance: 39,120; Referee: Terje Hauge (Norway)

25 November 2009 5	Bayern Munich (Germany)	1–0	(Israel) Maccabi Haifa	Munich, Germany
20:45 CET (UTC+1)	Olić 62'	Report	Masilela (yellow card) 57'; Arbeitman (yellow card) 81'	Stadium: Allianz Arena; Attendance: 58,000; Referee: Craig Thomson (Scotland)

8 December 2009 6	Maccabi Haifa (Israel)	0–1	(France) Bordeaux	Ramat Gan, Israel
21:45 IST (UTC+2)	Culma (yellow card) 39'	Report	Jussiê 13'	Stadium: Ramat Gan Stadium; Attendance: 25,800; Referee: Jonas Eriksson (Sweden)
