= 2008–09 Maccabi Haifa F.C. season =

Maccabi Haifa
2008–09 season
- Chairman: Ya'akov Shahar
- Manager: Elisha Levy
- Liga Al: 1st
- State Cup: Runners-up
- Toto Cup: Quarterfinals
- Top goalscorer: League: Thembinkosi Fanteni (11); All: Thembinkosi Fanteni (16)
- Highest home attendance: 14,500 vs Hapoel Tel Aviv (8 December 2008 & 18 May 2009)
- Lowest home attendance: 7,000 vs Bnei Sakhnin (24 January 2009)
- Average home league attendance: 10,472
Home colours	Away colours	Third colours

The 2008–09 season was Maccabi Haifa's 51st season in Israeli Premier League, and their 27th consecutive season in the top division of Israeli football.

The season was a great success for the club winning the league and coming extremely close to winning the State Cup to go with it.

== Liga Al ==
Date	Opponents	H / A	Result F – A	Scorers	Attendance
30 August 2008	F.C. Ashdod	H	3 – 1	Keinan, Katan (2)	11,000
13 September 2008	Hapoel Tel Aviv	A	0 – 0		0 (closed doors)
21 September 2008	Bnei Yehuda	H	1 – 0	Rafaelov	7,500
28 September 2008	Beitar Jerusalem	A	1 – 1	Keinan	18,000
4 October 2008	Maccabi Petah Tikva	H	3 – 1	own goal, Fanteni (2)	8,000
18 October 2008	Bnei Sakhnin	A	1 – 0	Rafaelov	2,500
27 October 2008	Maccabi Tel Aviv	H	3 – 2	Fanteni (2), Lior Rafaelov	14,000
1 November 2008	Hakoah Amidar/Ramat Gan	A	3 – 0	Rafaelov, Boccoli, Kayal	2,500
10 November 2008	Maccabi Netanya	H	2 – 3	Keinan, Fanteni	14,000
15 November 2008	Ironi Kiryat Shmona	H	1 – 1	Rafaelov	10,000
22 November 2008	Hapoel Petah Tikva	A	4 – 1	Ghadir, Rafaelov, Kayal, Arbeitman	4,000
29 November 2008	F.C. Ashdod	A	3 – 1	Fanteni, Golasa, Kayal	5,000
8 December 2008	Hapoel Tel Aviv	H	2 – 2	Arbeitman, Maimon	14,500
15 December 2008	Bnei Yehuda Tel Aviv	A	1 – 0	Katan	8,000
22 December 2008	Beitar Jerusalem	H	0 – 0		14,000
17 January 2009	Maccabi Petah Tikva	A	0 – 2		4,000
24 January 2009	Bnei Sakhnin	H	2 – 1	Fanteni, Katan	7,000
2 February 2009	Maccabi Tel Aviv	A	1 – 1	Boccoli	13,000
2 February 2009	Hakoah Amidar/Ramat Gan	H	2 – 0	Katan, Boccoli	8,000
23 February 2009	Maccabi Netanya	A	0 – 2		5,000
4 March 2009	Ironi Kiryat Shmona	A	0 – 1		1,000
7 March 2009	Hapoel Petah Tikva	H	1 – 0	Osei	9,000
15 March 2009	Bnei Yehuda	A	1 – 0	Masilela	6,000
21 March 2009	Maccabi Petah Tikva	H	0 – 0		9,000
6 April 2009	F.C. Ashdod	A	3 – 0	Arbeitman, Rafaelov, Boccoli	2,500
11 April 2009	Hapoel Petah Tikva	H	2 – 1	Arbeitman, Meshumar	10,000
19 April 2009	Maccabi Tel Aviv	A	1 – 1	Fanteni	12,000
25 April 2009	Hapoel Petah Tikva	H	2 – 1	Fanteni (2)	8,000
4 May 2009	Bnei Sakhnin	A	0 – 0		3,000
9 May 2009	Hakoah Amidar Ramat Gan	H	2 – 0	Arbeitman, Rafaelov	8,000
18 May 2009	Hapoel Tel Aviv	H	1 – 0	Katan	14,500
23 May 2009	Maccabi Netanya	A	2 – 0	Fanteni, Kayal	6,000
1 June 2009	Beitar Jerusalem	H	1 – 1	Rafaelov	14,000

Pos	Team	Pld	W	D	L	GF	GA	GD	Pts	Qualification or relegation
1	Maccabi Haifa (C)	33	19	10	4	49	24	+25	67	Qualification for the Champions League second qualifying round
2	Hapoel Tel Aviv	33	17	10	6	49	28	+21	61	Qualification for the Europa League third qualifying round
3	Beitar Jerusalem (Note: Beitar Jerusalem did not obtain the license for competing in next year's European competitions because they failed to meet their commitments to UEFA. Since Beitar won the cup and the cup runners-up are league champions Maccabi Haifa, all Europa League spots were awarded to teams according to their league positions. Since Beitar also finished third in the league, Europa League spots were given to league runners-up Hapoel Tel Aviv, fourth-placed Maccabi Netanya and fifth-placed Bnei Yehuda.)	33	16	12	5	47	28	+19	57 (Note: Beitar Jerusalem were deducted two points due to Beitar fans pitch invasion the previous year against Maccabi Herzliya and one point due to racist calls from Beitar fans.)	
4	Maccabi Netanya	33	14	12	7	40	32	+8	54	Qualification for the Europa League second qualifying round (Note: Qualified because Beitar Jerusalem did not obtain the license for competing in next year's European competitions.)
5	Bnei Yehuda	33	14	7	12	38	31	+7	49	Qualification for the Europa League first qualifying round

Source: Israel Football Association
Rules for classification: 1st points; 2nd goal difference; 3rd matches won; 4th goals scored; 5th head-to-head; 6th decision match
(C) Champions

== State Cup ==
Date	Round	Opponents	H / A	Result F – A	Scorers	Attendance
14 February 2009	Round 9	Hapoel Ramat Gan	A	1 – 0 (aet)	Katan 113'	
12 March 2009	Round of 16	Hapoel Tel Aviv	A	1 – 1 (2 – 1p)	Katan 81'	12,500
22 April 2009	Quarter-final	Maccabi Ah"i Nazareth	A	4 – 0	Fanteni (2) 30', 87', Katan 45', Harazi 82'	4,000
13 May 2009	Semi-final	Maccabi Netanya	N	1 – 1 (5 – 4p)	Meshumar 65'	36,000
26 May 2009	Final	Beitar Jerusalem	N	1 – 2	Kayal 88'	40,000

== Toto Cup ==
=== Group stage ===
Date	Opponents	H / A	Result F – A	Scorers	Attendance	Group position
9 August 2008	Beitar Jerusalem	H	1 – 1	Fanteni 31'		1st
17 August 2008	Maccabi Netanya	H	1 – 1	Boccoli 5'		1st
23 August 2008	Bnei Yehuda	A	3 – 1	Kayal 6', Rafaelov 16', Fanteni 21'		1st
5 November 2008	Beitar Jerusalem	A	2 – 0	Ghadir 59', Arbeitman 89'		1st
29 October 2008	Maccabi Netanya	A	4 – 1	Ghadir 20', Osei 43', Arbeitman (2) 53', 82'		1st
12 November 2008	Bnei Yehuda	H	1 – 1	Ghadir 12'		1st

Pos	Team	Pld	W	D	L	GF	GA	GD	Pts
1	Maccabi Haifa (A)	6	3	3	0	12	5	+7	12
2	Bnei Yehuda (A)	6	3	1	2	10	10	0	10
3	Maccabi Netanya (A)	6	2	1	3	6	10	−4	7
4	Beitar Jerusalem	6	1	1	4	6	9	−3	4

Source: football.org.il (in Hebrew)
Rules for classification: 1st points; 2nd goal difference; 3rd matches won; 4th goals scored; 5th head-to-head; 6th decision match
(A) Advanced to the quarterfinals

=== Knockout stage ===
Date	Round	Opponents	H / A	Result F – A	Scorers	Attendance
5 January 2009	Quarter-final; First leg	Hapoel Tel Aviv	A	0 – 2		
11 March 2009	Quarter-final; Second leg	Hapoel Tel Aviv	H	2 – 0 (3 – 4p)	Boccoli 22', Keinan 55'	

== Squad statistics ==
Pos.	Name	League		State Cup		Toto Cup		Total	
Pos.	Name	Apps	Goals	Apps	Goals	Apps	Goals	Apps	Goals
GK	(Israel) Gad Amos	0	0	0	0	2	0	2	0
GK	(Israel) Nir Davidovich	22	0	5	0	3	0	30	0
GK	(Israel) Amir Edri	11	0	0	0	5	0	16	0
DF	(Israel) Ronnie Gafney	4	0	1	0	7	0	12	0
DF	(Israel) Alon Harazi	24	0	3	1	4	0	31	1
DF	(Israel) Dekel Keinan	28	3	5	0	4	1	37	4
DF	(United States) Leo Krupnik	30	0	4	1	5	0	39	1
DF	(South Africa) Tsepo Masilela	32	0	4	0	3	0	39	0
DF	(Israel) Shai Maimon	6	1	0	0	6	1	12	2
DF	(Israel) Eyal Meshumar	18	1	4	2	6	0	28	3
DF	(Nigeria) Anderson West	3	0	1	0	1	0	5	0
MF	(Israel) Omri Afek	14	0	1	0	3	0	18	0
MF	(Brazil) Gustavo Boccoli	33	4	5	0	4	2	42	6
MF	(Colombia) John Jairo Culma	30	0	5	1	6	1	41	2
MF	(Israel) Liad Elmaliah	0	0	0	0	2	0	2	0
MF	(Israel) Eyal Golasa	26	1	5	0	6	0	37	1
MF	(Israel) Beram Kayal	30	4	5	2	5	1	40	7
MF	(Israel) Lior Rafaelov	33	9	5	0	6	1	44	10
MF	(Israel) Yisrael Zaguri	2	0	0	0	6	1	8	1
FW	(Israel) Shlomi Arbeitman	28	5	5	1	7	3	40	9
FW	(South Africa) Thembinkosi Fanteni	30	11	5	3	6	2	41	16
FW	(Israel) Mohammad Ghadir	14	1	0	0	7	3	21	4
FW	(Israel) Yaniv Katan	31	10	5	4	4	0	40	14
FW	(Ghana) Ransford Osei	11	1	2	0	4	1	17	2
