= 2010–11 Maccabi Haifa F.C. season =

Maccabi Haifa
2010–11 season
- Chairman: (Israel) Ya'akov Shahar
- Manager: (Israel) Elisha Levy
- Ligat Ha'Al: 1st
- State Cup: Runners-up
- Toto Cup: Quarterfinals
- Top goalscorer: League: (Israel) Tomer Hemed (13); All: (Israel) Tomer Hemed (16)
- Highest home attendance: 15,000 vs Ironi Kiryat Shmona (16 May 2011)
- Lowest home attendance: 6,000 vs Hapoel Akko (6 December 2010) & Bnei Sakhnin (5 February 2011)
- Average home league attendance: 9,611
Home colours	Away colours	Third colours

The 2010–11 season is Maccabi Haifa's 53rd season in Israeli Premier League, and their 29th consecutive season in the top division of Israeli football.

== UEFA Europa League ==
=== Qualification ===
Date	Opponents	H / A	Result F – A	Scorers	Attendance
29 July 2010	(Belarus) Dinamo Minsk	H	1 – 0	Dvalishvili 30	10,000
5 August 2010	(Belarus) Dinamo Minsk	A	1 – 3	Dvalishvili 27	5,000

== Toto Cup ==
=== Group stage ===
Date	Opponents	H / A	Result F – A	Scorers	Attendance
1 August 2011	Hapoel Akko	H	4 – 1	Dvalishvili 1', Boccoli 14', Refaelov 23', Hemed 35'	2,000
8 August 2011	Ironi Kiryat Shmona	A	1 – 1	Golasa 56'	500
14 August 2011	Hapoel Haifa	H	3 – 0	Dvalishvili 48', Katan 63', Hemed 74'	12,000
20 September 2011	Hapoel Akko	A	2 – 3	Refaelov 2', Ghadir 16'	300
26 October 2011	Ironi Kiryat Shmona	H	1 – 1	Culma 19'	2,000
10 November 2011	Hapoel Haifa	A	1 – 0	Levi 50' (O.G)	7,500

Pos	Team	Pld	W	D	L	GF	GA	GD	Pts
1	Maccabi Haifa (A)	6	3	2	1	12	6	+6	11
2	Ironi Kiryat Shmona (A)	6	1	5	0	8	7	+1	8
3	Hapoel Haifa	6	1	3	2	6	9	−3	6
4	Hapoel Acre	6	1	2	3	9	13	−4	5

Source: football.org.il (in Hebrew)
Rules for classification: 1st points; 2nd goal difference; 3rd matches won; 4th goals scored; 5th head-to-head; 6th decision match
(A) Advanced to the quarterfinals

=== Quarter-final ===
Date	Opponents	H / A	Result F – A	Scorers	Attendance
30 December 2011	Maccabi Tel Aviv	A	0 – 1		

== Ligat Ha'Al ==
=== Regular season ===
Date	Opponents	H / A	Result F – A	Scorers	Attendance
22 August 2010	Maccabi Tel Aviv	A	1 – 0	Ghadir 33'	15,000
28 August 2010	Maccabi Petah Tikva	H	1 – 0	Ghadir 5'	8,000
13 September 2010	Hapoel Be'er Sheva	A	1 – 1	Dvalishvili 50'	6,000
25 September 2010	Bnei Yehuda Tel Aviv	A	3 – 2	Refaelov 24', 26' Dvalishvili 74'	7,000
3 October 2010	Beitar Jerusalem	H	3 – 3	Golasa 17', Azulay 65' 77'	13,000
16 October 2010	Bnei Sakhnin	A	2 – 1	Azulay 36', Katan 90'	2,500
23 October 2010	F.C. Ashdod	H	1 – 1	Refaelov 72'	8,000
31 October 2010	Hapoel Petah Tikva	A	1 – 0	Dvalishvili 65'	5,000
8 November 2010	Hapoel Tel Aviv	H	0 – 2		14,500
13 November 2010	Hapoel Ramat Gan	A	3 – 1	Meshumar 9', Culma 43', Azulay 90'	2,000
22 November 2010	Hapoel Haifa	H	0 – 0		14,000
27 November 2010	Hapoel Askelon	A	3 – 0	Dvalishvili 44', Refaelov 64' Meshumar 73',	3,000
6 December 2010	Hapoel Akko	H	3 – 1	Ghadir 63', Refaelov 88', Katan 90'	6,000
13 December 2010	Ironi Kiryat Shmona	A	1 – 0	Katan 77'	3,000
18 December 2010	Maccabi Netanya	H	3 – 0	Hemed 30' Meshumar 55', Dvalishvili 63'	7,000
3 January 2011	Maccabi Tel Aviv	H	3 – 0	Twatiha 34', Golasa 40, Dvalishvili 55'	14,000
9 January 2011	Maccabi Petah Tikva	A	3 – 1	Dvalishvili (2) 31', 90', Hemed 55'	4,000
15 January 2011	Hapoel Be'er Sheva	H	2 – 2	Dvalishvili 17', Boccoli 55'	8,000
22 January 2011	Bnei Yehuda Tel Aviv	H	1 – 0	Dvalishvili 39'	8,000
30 January 2011	Beitar Jerusalem	A	0 – 0		9,000
5 February 2011	Bnei Sakhnin	H	1 – 0	Hemed 77'	6,000
12 February 2011	F.C. Ashdod	A	1 – 0	Hemed 77'	4,000
21 February 2011	Hapoel Petah Tikva	H	2 – 0	Vered 32' Ghadir 76'	8,000
27 February 2011	Hapoel Tel Aviv	A	1 – 4	Ghadir 51'	15,000
6 March 2011	Hapoel Ramat Gan	H	3 – 2	Refaelov 12', Hemed 43', Vered 69'	7,000
14 March 2011	Hapoel Haifa	A	2 – 0	Refaelov 60', Dvalishvili 85'	11,000
19 March 2011	Hapoel Askelon	H	3 – 0	Maimon 18', Hemed (2) 42', 56'	8,000
2 April 2011	Hapoel Akko	A	2 – 0	Hemed 72', Azulay 76'	3,500
11 April 2011	Ironi Kiryat Shmona	H	3 – 2	Azulay 38', Refaelov 59', Hemed 64'	11,000
17 April 2011	Maccabi Netanya	A	1 – 1	Hemed 56'	6,000

Pos	Team	Pld	W	D	L	GF	GA	GD	Pts	Qualification
1	Maccabi Haifa	30	21	7	2	55	25	+30	70	Qualification for the championship round
2	Hapoel Tel Aviv	30	20	5	5	65	27	+38	65	Qualification for the championship round
3	Maccabi Tel Aviv	30	15	5	10	41	33	+8	50	Qualification for the championship round
4	Ironi Kiryat Shmona	30	13	9	8	50	34	+16	48	Qualification for the championship round
5	Bnei Yehuda	30	13	9	8	33	27	+6	48	Qualification for the championship round

Source: Israel Football Association
Rules for classification: 1st points; 2nd goal difference; 3rd matches won; 4th goals scored; 5th head-to-head; 6th decision match

=== Top playoff ===
Date	Opponents	H / A	Result F – A	Scorers	Attendance
23 April 2011	Maccabi Netanya	H	1 – 2	Refaelov 17'	11,000
30 April 2011	Hapoel Tel Aviv	H	2 – 0	Katan 30', Dvalishvili 66'	14,500
7 May 2011	Maccabi Tel Aviv	A	2 – 0	Hemed 6', 45'	13,000
16 May 2011	Ironi Kiryat Shmona	H	2 – 0	Refaelov 64', 72'	15,000
21 May 2011	Bnei Yehuda Tel Aviv	A	1 – 1	Ghadir 69'	3,000

Pos	Team	Pld	W	D	L	GF	GA	GD	Pts	Qualification
1	Maccabi Haifa (C)	35	24	8	3	63	28	+35	45	Qualification for the Champions League second qualifying round
2	Hapoel Tel Aviv	35	21	7	7	72	36	+36	38	Qualification for the Europa League third qualifying round (Note: Hapoel Tel Aviv have qualified for the third qualifying round of the 2011–12 UEFA Europa League after winning the 2010–11 Israel State Cup.)
3	Maccabi Tel Aviv	35	18	6	11	53	40	+13	35	Qualification for the Europa League second qualifying round
4	Bnei Yehuda	35	15	10	10	42	34	+8	31	Qualification for the Europa League second qualifying round
5	Ironi Kiryat Shmona	35	14	10	11	57	45	+12	28	
6	Maccabi Netanya	35	12	13	10	47	47	0	27	

Source: Israel Football Association
Rules for classification: 1st points; 2nd goal difference; 3rd matches won; 4th goals scored; 5th head-to-head; 6th decision match
(C) Champions

=== Israel State Cup ===
2 December 2010 Eighth Round	Hapoel Kfar Saba	0-3	Maccabi Haifa	Kfar Saba, Israel
18:00			Vered 18', Hemed 25' Ottman 68'	Stadium: Levita Stadium; Attendance: 10,00; Referee: Shai Sihtrit

2 March 2011 Round of 16	Maccabi Haifa	3-1	Hapoel Jerusalem	Haifa, Israel
--20:00	Hemed 20', Refaelov 66'		Davidovich 19' (O.G)	Stadium: Kiryat Eliezer Stadium; Attendance: 3,000; Referee: Roi Rainsriber

20 April 2011 Quarter-final	Hapoel Haifa	1-3	Maccabi Haifa	Haifa, Israel
20:00	Ben Basat 29'		Vered 38', Refaelov 59', 71'	Stadium: Kiryat Eliezer Stadium; Attendance: 10,00; Referee: Liran Liani

11 May 2011 Semi-final	Maccabi Netanya	2-3	Maccabi Haifa	Ramat Gan, Israel
20:45	Mugrabi 30', Saba'a 59'		Hemed 37', Dvalishvili 55', Refaelov 68'	Stadium: Ramat Gan Stadium; Attendance: 30,000; Referee: Manasha Masuah

26 May 2011 Final	Hapoel Tel Aviv	1-0	Maccabi Haifa	Ramat Gan, Israel
20:05	Tuama 2'			Stadium: Ramat Gan Stadium; Attendance: 40,000; Referee: Meir Levi
