= Golasa =

Golasa is a surname. Notable people with the surname include:

- Avner Golasa (1957–2020), Israeli footballer, father of Eyal
- Eyal Golasa (born 1991), Israeli footballer
