= Thembinkosi Fanteni =

South African football striker (born 1984)

Personal information
- Full name: Lawley Thembinkosi Fanteni
- Date of birth: 2 February 1984 (age 42)
- Place of birth: Paarl, South Africa
- Height: 1.77 m (5 ft 9 1/2 in)
- Position: Striker

Youth career
- Mountain Stars
- Royal Kings

Senior career*
Years	Team	Apps	(Gls)
2002–2005	Mother City F.C.	82	(75)
2005–2008	Ajax Cape Town	67	(27)
2008–2009	Maccabi Haifa	44	(17)
2009–2010	→Orlando Pirates (loan)	12	(1)
2010–2012	Ajax Cape Town	45	(15)
2012–2013	Bidvest Wits	5	(1)
2015–	Steenberg United		

International career^{‡}
2007–2011	South Africa	23	(3)
- * Club domestic league appearances and goals as of 8 July 2013 ‡ National team caps and goals as of 8 July 2013

Thembinkosi "Terror" Fanteni (born 2 February 1984) is a South African football striker.

He was part of the South African squad at the 2008 African Nations Cup and the 2009 FIFA Confederations Cup.

== International goals ==
#	Date	Venue	Opponent	Score	Result	Competition
1	2008-06-07	Atteridgeville, South Africa	Equatorial Guinea	3–0	4–1	WCQ
2	2009-06-06	Johannesburg, South Africa	Poland	1–0	1–0	Friendly match
