= Avner Golasa =

Israeli footballer (1957–2020)

Avner Golasa אבנר גולסה
Personal information
- Full name: Avner Golasa
- Date of birth: 1957
- Place of birth: Kfar Saba, Israel
- Date of death: 24 August 2020 (aged 62–63)

Youth career
- Hapoel Kfar Saba

Senior career*
Years	Team	Apps	(Gls)
1973–1982	Hapoel Kfar Saba		(15)
- * Club domestic league appearances and goals

Avner Golasa (Hebrew: אבנר גולסה; 1957 – 24 August 2020) was an Israeli professional footballer who played for Hapoel Kfar Saba as a midfielder.

Golasa was born in Kfar Saba, Israel, to a Mizrahi Jewish family from Yemen. He was the father of Roei Golasa, Eyal Golasa, and Orel Golasa, all of whom have become professional footballers as well.

== Honours ==
=== With Hapoel Kfar Saba ===
- Israeli Championships
  - Winner (1): 1981–82
- State Cup
  - Winner (2): 1974–75, 1979–80
