= Haim Ziskind =

Israeli footballer

Haim Ziskind חיים זינסקינד
Personal information
- Full name: Haim Ziskind
- Date of birth: June 14, 1990 (age 36)
- Place of birth: Haifa, Israel
- Height: 1.88 m (6 ft 2 in)
- Position: Goalkeeper

Team information
- Current team: Maccabi Bnei Reineh

Youth career
- 2004–2008: Maccabi Haifa

Senior career*
Years	Team	Apps	(Gls)
2009–2012	Maccabi Haifa	6	(0)
2010–2012	→ Hapoel Herzliya (loan)	6	(0)
2012–2016	Ironi Tiberias	117	(0)
2016–2017	Hapoel Beit She'an	26	(0)
2017–2018	F.C. Haifa Robi Shapira	26	(0)
2018–2020	Hapoel Umm al-Fahm	32	(0)
2020–2021	Maccabi Bnei Reineh	20	(0)
- * Club domestic league appearances and goals

Haim Ziskind (Hebrew: חיים זינסקינד; born June 14, 1990, in Haifa, Israel) is an Israeli former footballer who plays for Maccabi Bnei Reineh.

== Career ==
Ziskind began his career with Maccabi Haifa and is the 3rd choice goalkeeper of the Ligat Toto team.

== Honours ==
=== Youth ===
- Israel Youth Club League
  - Winner (1): 2008-2009
