= Shlomi Azulay =

Israeli footballer

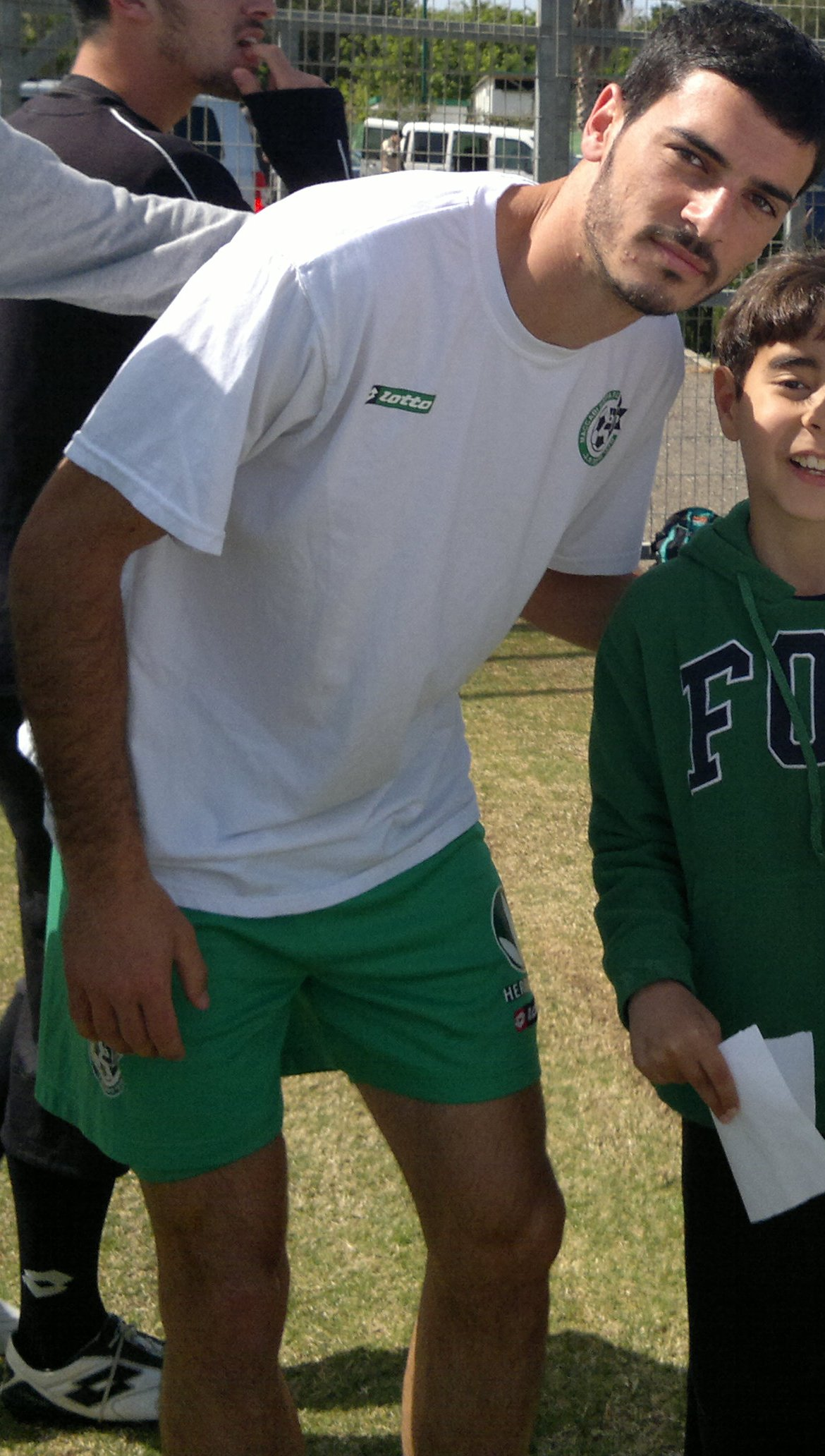
- Azulay in 2011

Personal information
- Full name: Shlomi Azulay
- Date of birth: 18 October 1989 (age 37)
- Place of birth: Tiberias, Israel
- Height: 1.86 m (6 ft 1 in)
- Position: Forward

Team information
- Current team: Hapoel Kfar Shalem

Youth career
- Ironi Tiberias
- Hapoel Kfar Saba

Senior career*
Years	Team	Apps	(Gls)
2008–2010	Hapoel Kfar Saba	46	(17)
2010–2014	Maccabi Haifa	61	(13)
2011–2012	→ Ironi Kiryat Shmona (loan)	26	(8)
2014	→ Beitar Jerusalem (loan)	15	(3)
2014–2015	Hapoel Tel Aviv	27	(4)
2015–2016	Bnei Sakhnin	36	(14)
2016–2017	Ironi Kiryat Shmona	32	(7)
2017–2019	Bnei Sakhnin	59	(15)
2019–2020	Beitar Jerusalem	33	(9)
2020–2021	Astra Giurgiu	6	(2)
2021–2022	Hapoel Tel Aviv	43	(8)
2022–2024	Maccabi Bnei Reineh	64	(15)
2024–2025	F.C. Ashdod	19	(1)
2025–	Hapoel Kfar Shalem	0	(0)
- * Club domestic league appearances and goals as of 27 June 2025

Shlomi Azulay (Hebrew: שלומי אזולאי; born 18 October 1989) is an Israeli professional footballer who plays as a forward for Hapoel Kfar Shalem

== Club career ==
Shlomi's first team was Liga Leumit side Hapoel Kfar Saba in the second division. He made his senior team debut for Hapoel Kfar Saba as a late 88th-minute substitute in a cup match against Beitar Jerusalem in February 2008.

On 30 October 2009, Kfar Saba played a Liga Leumit match against Beitar Shimshon Tel Aviv. At half time, the score was 0–0. Shlomi was sent into the match in the second half and scored twice to lead his team to a 2–0 win.

Azulay scored an important winning goal in the last game of the season on 14 May 2010 against Ironi Ramat HaSharon. Hapoel Kfar Saba defeated Ramat HaSharon 2–1 and secured the third place. Kfar Saba then went on to lose the promotion playoff match. Azulay ended the 2009–10 season with 15 goals to his name.

For the 2010–11 season, Azulay signed in Maccabi Haifa from the Israeli Premier League, in his debut game, he scored twice against Beitar Jerusalem after he had entered as a substitute in the 66th minute. A week later he scored yet again, this time against Bnei Sakhnin. Azulay scored six goals and Assisted six in the championship season of Maccabi Haifa.

A year later he was loaned to Ironi Kiryat Shmona and took part in the surprising Championship of Kiryat Shmona and provided 8 goals and 5 assists.

After the historic championship with Irony Kiryat Shmona, Shlomi came back to Maccabi Haifa. In the 2012–13 season Shlomi plays either as a left winger or as a central striker during the season and provided 7 goals and 1 assist.

On 8 June 2019, he signed a two-year contract with Beitar Jerusalem.

== Career statistics ==
As of 8 August 2022

Appearances and goals by club, season and competition
Club	Season	League		Cup		Toto Cup		Europe		Total	
Club	Season	Apps	Goals	Apps	Goals	Apps	Goals	Apps	Goals	Apps	Goals
Hapoel Kfar Saba	2008–09	21	2	2	0	10	2	0	0	33	4
Hapoel Kfar Saba	2009–10	25	15	1	0	5	0	0	0	31	15
Maccabi Haifa	2010–11	22	6	4	0	4	0	0	0	30	6
Maccabi Haifa	2011–12	1	0	0	0	3	1	2	0	6	1
Maccabi Haifa	2012–13	31	7	3	1	4	0	0	0	38	8
Maccabi Haifa	2013–14	7	2	0	0	0	0	3	0	10	2
Hapoel Ironi Kiryat Shmona (loan)	2011–12	26	8	2	0	3	0	0	0	31	8
Beitar Jerusalem (loan)	2013–14	15	3	3	1	0	0	0	0	18	4
Hapoel Tel Aviv	2014–15	27	4	1	0	1	0	0	0	29	4
Bnei Sakhnin	2015–16	36	14	4	1	2	0	0	0	42	15
Ironi Kiryat Shmona	2016–17	30	7	3	0	6	0	0	0	39	7
Ironi Kiryat Shmona	2017–18	2	0	0	0	4	0	0	0	6	0
Bnei Sakhnin	2017–18	28	6	1	0	0	0	0	0	29	6
Bnei Sakhnin	2018–19	31	9	2	1	0	0	0	0	33	10
Beitar Jerusalem	2019–20	32	9	1	0	5	2	0	0	38	11
Beitar Jerusalem	2020–21	1	0	0	0	4	0	1	0	6	0
Astra Giurgiu	2020–21	6	2	1	1	0	0	0	0	7	3
Hapoel Tel Aviv	2020–21	16	2	4	1	0	0	0	0	20	3
Hapoel Tel Aviv	2021–22	27	6	1	0	5	1	0	0	33	7
Maccabi Bnei Reineh	2022–23	0	0	0	0	1	0	0	0	1	0
Career total		384	102	33	6	57	6	6	0	480	114

== Honours ==
- Israeli Premier League: 2010–11, 2011–12
- Israel State Cup runner-up: 2011
- Toto Cup: 2011–12, 2019–20

=== Individual ===
- 2015–16 Israeli Premier League second top scorer: 2015–16
