= Jhon Culma =

Colombian footballer (born 1981)

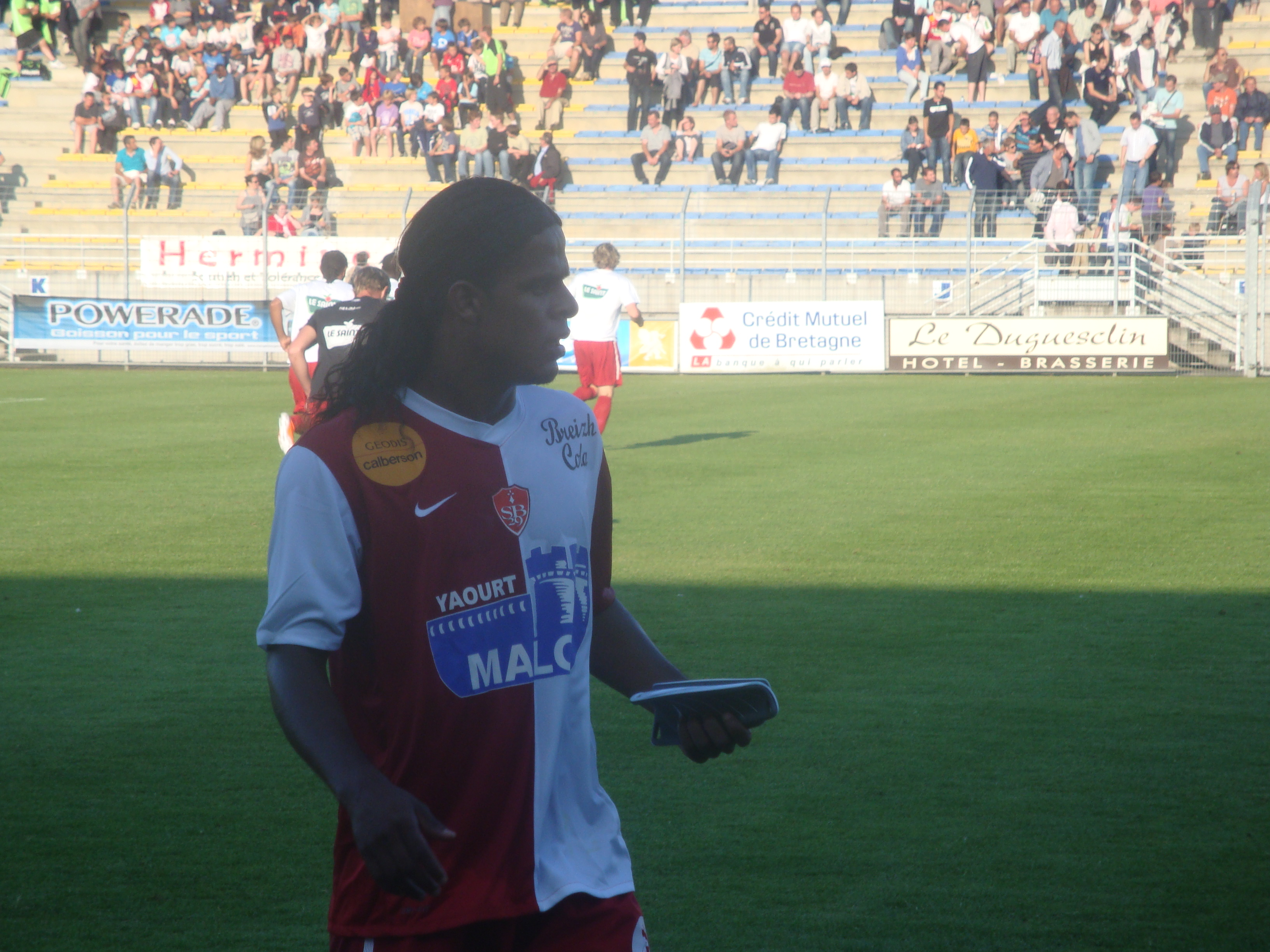

Personal information
- Full name: Jhon Jairo Culma
- Date of birth: 17 March 1981 (age 45)
- Place of birth: Florida, Valle del Cauca, Colombia
- Height: 1.81 m (5 ft 11 1/2 in)
- Position: Defensive midfielder

Youth career
- 1998–2000: Independiente

Senior career*
Years	Team	Apps	(Gls)
2000–2001	Independiente	0	(0)
2001–2003	Cruz Azul	0	(0)
2003–2005	Cruz Azul Oaxaca	31	(3)
2005–2006	Brujas		
2006–2007	Bnei Sakhnin	53	(1)
2008–2011	Maccabi Haifa	82	(1)
2011–2013	Brest	26	(0)

International career
2001	Colombia U20		
2005	Colombia	1	(0)
- * Club domestic league appearances and goals as of 7 June 2011

Jhon Jairo Culma (born 17 March 1981), sometimes spelled as John Jairo Culma, is a Colombian former footballer who played as a defensive midfielder.

== Career ==
Born in Florida, Valle del Cauca, Culma was raised in Ortigal, Cauca. He began playing youth football in the local Valle del Cauca league, and would train with the youth sides of América de Cali, Millonarios and Deportivo Cali. At age 17, Culma had a trial with Montpellier, but ultimately moved to Argentina where he signed with Independiente.

Culma signed a long-term deal with Cruz Azul in 2001, where he would play primarily for its affiliate club, Cruz Azul Oaxaca. However, he was selected to participate in the parent club's 2003 Copa Libertadores matches.

In 2005, Brujas manager Carlos Restrepo signed Culma to play for the Costa Rican Primera División club.

Culma played for the Colombia national under-20 football team, participating in the 2001 South American U-20 Championship.

== Honours ==
- Israeli Premier League: 2008–09, 2010–11

== Personal life ==
Culma's brother, Gustavo, is also a professional footballer who plays for Once Caldas.
