= Tsepo Masilela =

South African soccer player (born 1985)

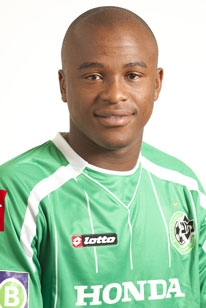

Personal information
- Full name: Peter Tsepo Masilela
- Date of birth: 5 May 1985 (age 41)
- Place of birth: Witbank, South Africa
- Height: 1.75 m (5 ft 9 in)
- Position: Left back

Youth career
- Manchester
- 2000–2002: Disco Makua Academy
- 2002–2003: Sonas Mpumalanga

Senior career*
Years	Team	Apps	(Gls)
2003–2005	Hellenic	48	(9)
2005–2007	Benoni	54	(1)
2007–2012	Maccabi Haifa	108	(2)
2011–2012	→ Getafe (loan)	13	(0)
2012–2018	Kaizer Chiefs	115	(0)
2019–2022	AmaZulu	26	(0)
Total		364	(12)

International career
2006–2013	South Africa	51	(0)
- * Club domestic league appearances and goals as of 23 October 2022

Peter Tsepo Masilela (born 5 May 1985) is a South African former professional soccer player who played as a left back.

== Early career ==
Masilela first played amateur soccer for local team, Manchester and later the Disco Makua Academy which was run by former Witbank Aces player Steve Makua who is the father of Frank Makua who played for Kaizer Chiefs. He then moved to Vodacom League club, Sonas Mpumalanga.

== Club career ==
Such was his meteoric rise Masilela made his full international debut before making his Premier Soccer League debut. In the same vein, after only one season in top-flight football in his home country, he made the move to Israeli club Maccabi Haifa.

=== Maccabi Haifa ===
Masilela signed a four-year contract with Maccabi Haifa on 31 August 2007. He was a crucial part of Maccabi Haifa winning the Israeli Championship, and qualifying for the UEFA Champions League. Masilela made 13 assists and one goal in the 2009–10 season. In June 2011, he extended his contract with a two-year deal.

=== Getafe ===
On 20 August 2011, Masilela joined the Spanish La Liga club Getafe on a season-long loan deal from Maccabi Haifa. He returned to Maccabi Haifa after the expiry of his loan deal with Getafe.

=== Kaizer Chiefs ===
Masilela returned to South Africa after five years overseas to sign for Kaizer Chiefs in mid-2012. He made his debut in November 2012 in a 3–2 win over Moroka Swallows.

== International career ==
Masilela was the first player to be called up while campaigning in the National First Division. Since 2006 he has played for South Africa, participating in the 2006 African Nations Cup, 2008 African Nations Cup, the 2009 FIFA Confederations Cup, the 2010 FIFA World Cup and the 2013 African Nations Cup.

== Personal life ==
His father, Eric Maela is a Witbank Aces legend having played with the likes of Lawrence Siyangaphi, Harris Chueu, Steve Makua and Thomas Ngobe, father of Dumisa Ngobe. He is paternal half-brother of Innocent Maela.

== Honours ==
Maccabi Haifa

- Israeli Premier League: 2008–09, 2010–11
- Toto Cup: 2007–08
