= Shlomi Arbeitman =

Israeli footballer (born 1985)

Shlomi Arbeitman שלומי ארביטמן
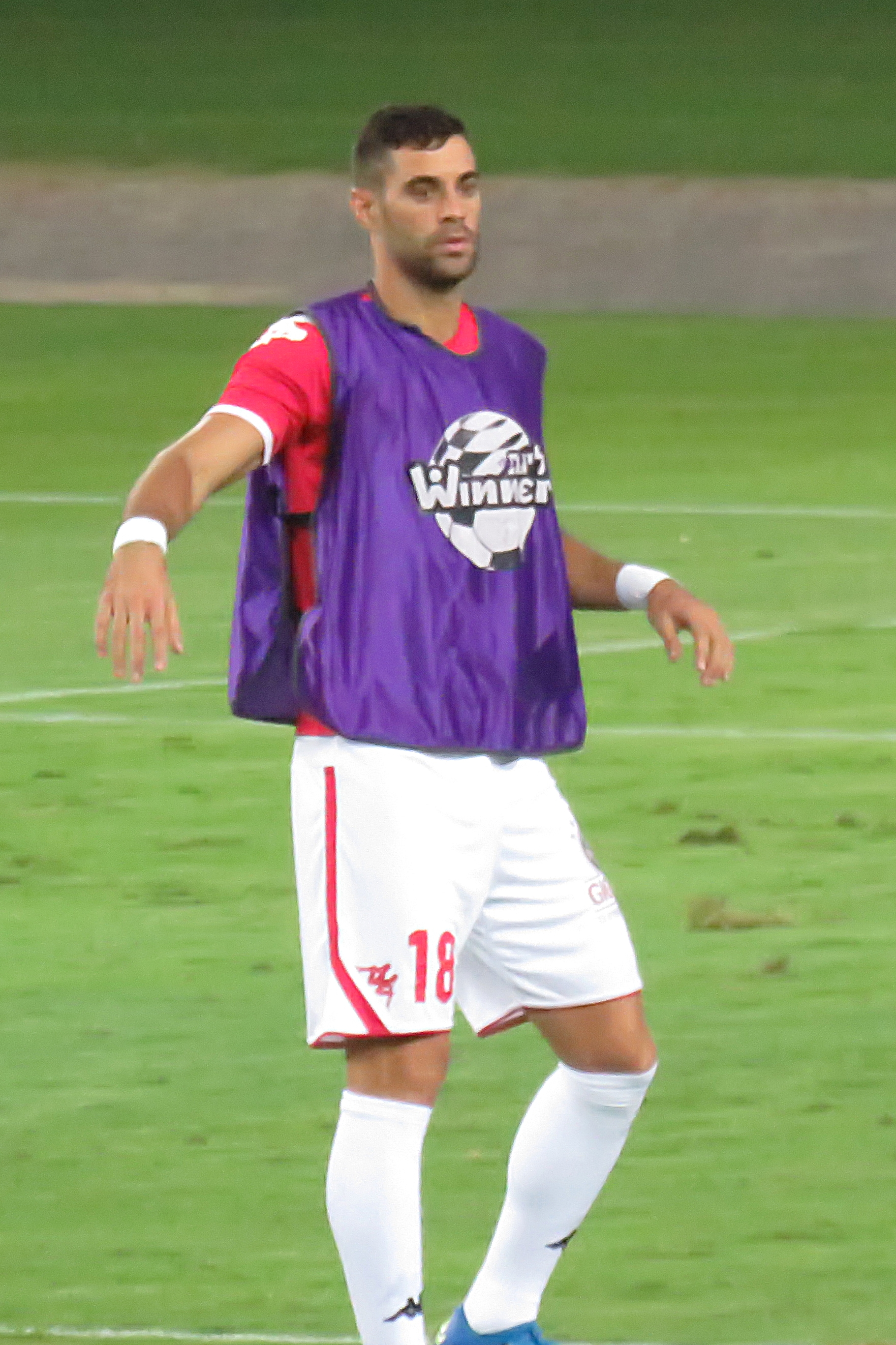
- Arbeitman with Hapoel Be'er Sheva in 2015

Personal information
- Date of birth: May 14, 1985 (age 41)
- Place of birth: Nordia, Israel
- Height: 1.84 m (6 ft 1/2 in)
- Position: Striker

Team information
- Current team: Ironi Modi'in

Youth career
- Beitar Nes Tubruk

Senior career*
| Years | Team | Apps | (Gls) |
| 2002–2004 | Beitar Jerusalem | 34 | (10) |
| 2004–2005 | Hapoel Petah Tikva | 27 | (12) |
| 2005–2010 | Maccabi Haifa | 125 | (50) |
| 2008 | → Hapoel Tel Aviv (loan) | 17 | (4) |
| 2010–2013 | Gent | 39 | (9) |
| 2011–2012 | → Westerlo (loan) | 11 | (4) |
| 2013 | → R.A.E.C. Mons (loan) | 10 | (3) |
| 2013–2014 | R.A.E.C. Mons | 28 | (5) |
| 2014–2016 | Hapoel Be'er Sheva | 46 | (12) |
| 2016–2017 | Hapoel Haifa | 37 | (9) |
| 2017–2018 | Maccabi Petah Tikva | 10 | (1) |
| 2018 | Hapoel Ra'anana | 7 | (2) |
| 2018 | Shimshon Kafr Qasim | 7 | (0) |
| 2018–2019 | Hapoel Ashdod | 15 | (3) |
| 2020–2021 | Ironi Modi'in | 0 | (0) |

International career
| 2004–2007 | Israel U21 | 17 | (4) |
| 2004–2016 | Israel | 10 | (3) |
- * Club domestic league appearances and goals

Shlomi Arbeitman (Hebrew: שלומי ארביטמן; born May 14, 1985) is an Israeli former professional footballer who played as a striker.

== Club career ==
A young striker, Arbeitman joined Maccabi Haifa for the 2005–06 season. He regularly played for the Israeli under-21 national side and has twice played for the senior national team, scoring a hat-trick against Azerbaijan on his debut in February 2004.

Prior to joining Haifa, he played for Beitar Jerusalem making his debut on March 3, 2003, against Ashdod as an 87th-minute substitute.

He also played for Hapoel Petah Tikva to whom he was controversially sold from Beitar, as he was still owned by his youth club Beitar Nes Tubruk, one game into the 2004–05 season. On January 16, 2008, Arbeitman was transferred on loan to Hapoel Tel Aviv until the end of the 2007–08 season.

On December 12, he held the highest "Goals Per Minute" score worldwide for 2010 based on the criteria of imscouting.com, scoring every 64.17 minutes on average.

In July 2010, Arbeitman transferred from Maccabi Haifa to Belgian side K.A.A Gent. He was given the No. 23 jersey. On July 31, 2010, he made his debut as a 70th-minute substitute for Adnan Čustović in Gent's 1–0 away win over KVC Westerlo.

in June 2014, Arbeitman returned to Israel and signed a 2-year contract with Hapoel Be'er Sheva. He moved to Hapoel Haifa on February 3, 2016.

On 26 September 2018, Arbeitman signed for Shimshon Kafr Qasim.

== Club career statistics ==
(correct as of May 2013)

| Club | Season | League | | | Cup | | | League Cup/Super Cup | | | Europe | | | Total | | |
| Club | Season | Apps | Goals | Assists | Apps | Goals | Assists | Apps | Goals | Assists | Apps | Goals | Assists | Apps | Goals | Assists |
|---|---|---|---|---|---|---|---|---|---|---|---|---|---|---|---|---|
| Beitar Jerusalem | 2002–03 | 6 | 2 | 0 | 0 | 0 | 0 | 0 | 0 | 0 | 0 | 0 | 0 | 6 | 2 | 0 |
| Beitar Jerusalem | 2003–04 | 27 | 7 | 2 | 2 | 1 | 1 | 4 | 0 | 0 | 0 | 0 | 0 | 33 | 8 | 3 |
| Beitar Jerusalem | 2004–05 | 1 | 0 | 0 | 0 | 0 | 0 | 0 | 0 | 0 | 0 | 0 | 0 | 1 | 0 | 0 |
| Hapoel Petah Tikva | 2004–05 | 27 | 12 | 0 | 3 | 0 | 0 | 6 | 3 | 0 | 0 | 0 | 0 | 36 | 15 | 0 |
| Maccabi Haifa | 2005–06 | 29 | 8 | 2 | 0 | 0 | 0 | 10 | 3 | 0 | 2 | 1 | 0 | 41 | 12 | 2 |
| Maccabi Haifa | 2006–07 | 29 | 9 | 2 | 3 | 1 | 0 | 4 | 0 | 0 | 4 | 0 | 0 | 40 | 10 | 2 |
| Maccabi Haifa | 2007–08 | 6 | 0 | 0 | 0 | 0 | 0 | 2 | 0 | 0 | 0 | 0 | 0 | 8 | 0 | 0 |
| Hapoel Tel Aviv (loan) | 2007–08 | 17 | 4 | 2 | 5 | 1 | 0 | 0 | 0 | 0 | 0 | 0 | 0 | 22 | 5 | 2 |
| Maccabi Haifa | 2008–09 | 28 | 5 | 3 | 0 | 0 | 0 | 8 | 3 | 0 | 0 | 0 | 0 | 36 | 8 | 3 |
| Maccabi Haifa | 2009–10 | 34 | 28 | 1 | 2 | 1 | 0 | 7 | 2 | 0 | 10 | 3 | 0 | 53 | 34 | 1 |
| Gent | 2010–11 | 27 | 7 | 0 | 3 | 2 | 0 | 1 | 0 | 0 | 7 | 1 | 0 | 38 | 10 | 0 |
| Gent | 2011–12 | 1 | 0 | 0 | 0 | 0 | 0 | 0 | 0 | 0 | 0 | 0 | 0 | 1 | 0 | 0 |
| Westerlo (loan) | 2011–12 | 11 | 4 | 1 | 1 | 1 | 0 | 0 | 0 | 0 | 0 | 0 | 0 | 12 | 5 | 0 |
| Gent | 2012–13 | 10 | 2 | 0 | 1 | 0 | 0 | 0 | 0 | 0 | 4 | 0 | 0 | 15 | 2 | 0 |
| R.A.E.C. Mons (loan) | 2012–13 | 10 | 3 | 2 | 0 | 0 | 0 | 0 | 0 | 0 | 0 | 0 | 0 | 10 | 3 | 2 |
| Career | | 263 | 91 | 15 | 20 | 7 | 1 | 42 | 11 | 0 | 27 | 5 | 0 | 352 | 114 | 16 |

== Honours ==
=== Club ===
Maccabi Haifa

- Israeli Premier League: 2005–06, 2008–09
- Toto Cup: 2005–06

=== Individual ===
- Israeli Premier League top scorer: 2009–10 (28 goals)
