= Mohammad Ghadir =

Israeli footballer

Mohammed Ghadir محمد غدير
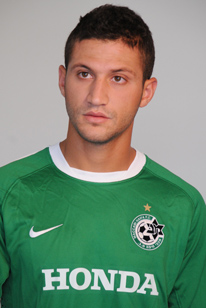

Personal information
- Date of birth: January 21, 1991 (age 35)
- Place of birth: Bir al-Maksur, Israel
- Height: 1.73 m (5 ft 8 in)
- Positions: Forward; winger

Team information
- Current team: Hapoel Hadera

Youth career
- 2006–2008: Maccabi Haifa

Senior career*
| Years | Team | Apps | (Gls) |
| 2008–2015 | Maccabi Haifa | 88 | (14) |
| 2012–2013 | → Waasland-Beveren (loan) | 5 | (0) |
| 2013–2015 | → Bnei Sakhnin (loan) | 61 | (22) |
| 2015–2016 | Lokeren | 8 | (0) |
| 2016–2018 | Hapoel Be'er Sheva | 26 | (3) |
| 2018–2019 | Bnei Sakhnin | 20 | (5) |
| 2019–2021 | Bnei Yehuda | 46 | (9) |
| 2021 | Hapoel Hadera | 9 | (1) |

International career
| 2006–2008 | Israel U17 | 17 | (8) |
| 2008–2011 | Israel U19 | 7 | (3) |
| 2008–2013 | Israel U21 | 4 | (1) |
- * Club domestic league appearances and goals

Mohammed Ghadir (Arabic: محمد غدير, Hebrew: מוחמד גדיר; born 21 January 1991) is a retired Israeli professional footballer.

== Club career ==
=== Maccabi Haifa ===
After progressing through the youth ranks of Maccabi Haifa, Ghadir made his first team debut for Haifa on 31 May 2008 against F.C. Ashdod, playing 88 minutes in Haifa's 2–0 loss. Ghadir scored his first club goal against Hapoel Petah Tikva on 22 November by opening the scoring in Haifa's 4–1 win. Ghadir played in the UEFA Champions League with Maccabi Haifa during the 2009–10 season.

== International career ==
A promising junior, Ghadir is a member of the Israel under-21 team after playing through the under-17 and under-19 ranks of the national team. He made his debut for the Israel under-21 team on 19 November 2008 against the Serbia under-21 team at Ramat Gan Stadium in his side's 3–2 loss. Ghadir scored in the game, just minutes after coming on as a substitute after half-time.

== Honours ==
=== Club ===
Maccabi Haifa

- Israeli Premier League (2): 2008–09, 2010–11

Hapoel Be'er Sheva

- Israeli Premier League (2): 2015–16, 2016-17
- Israel Super Cup (1): 2016
- Toto Cup (1): 2016-17
