= Gustavo Boccoli =

Brazilian-Israeli footballer (born 1978)

Gustavo Boccoli גוסטבו בוקולי
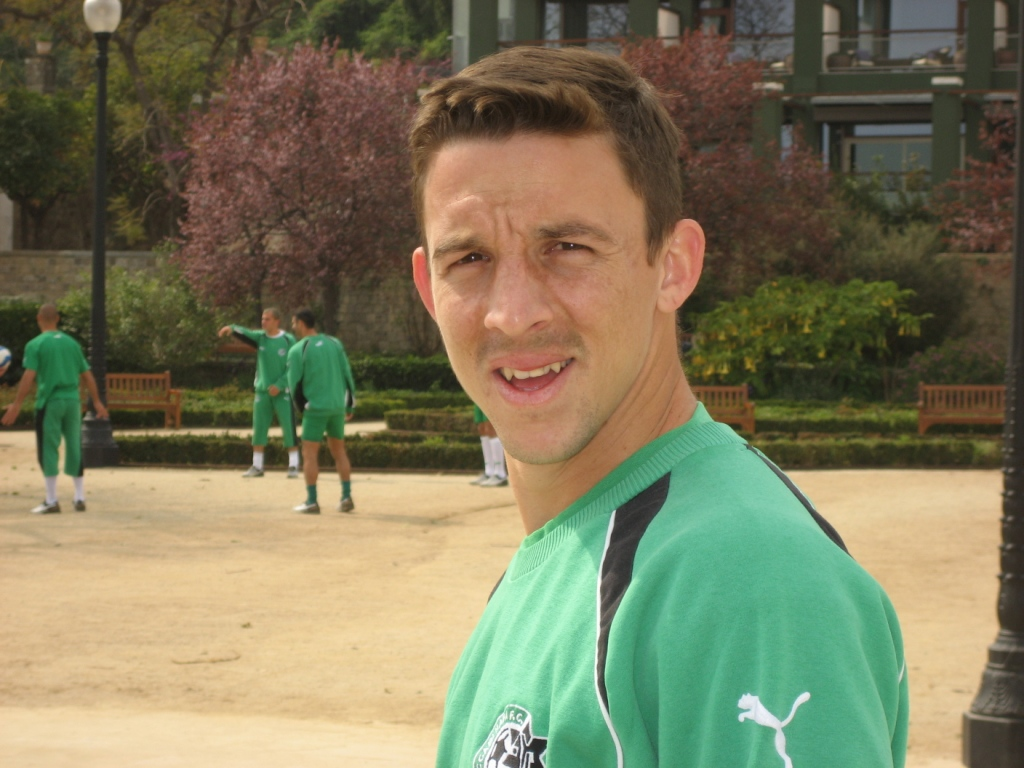
- Bocooli playing for Maccabi Haifa in 2007

Personal information
- Date of birth: 16 February 1978 (age 48)
- Place of birth: São Paulo, Brazil
- Height: 1.72 m (5 ft 8 in)
- Position: Midfielder

Senior career*
Years	Team	Apps	(Gls)
1999–2000	Brescia	0	(0)
2000–2001	Paraná Clube		
2001–2002	Hapoel Ramat Gan		(9)
2002	Hakoah Ramat Gan		(6)
2003–2004	Maccabi Ahi Nazareth	63	(16)
2004–2015	Maccabi Haifa	434	(39)
- * Club domestic league appearances and goals

Gustavo Boccoli (Hebrew: גוסטבו בוקולי; born 16 February 1978) is a retired Brazilian-Israeli footballer. He was a versatile midfielder who played most of his career for Israeli Premier League club Maccabi Haifa.

== Early and personal life ==
After multiple attempts of application for Israeli citizenship, and after he was given only a temporary resident status, Boccoli was given a permanent resident status and an Israeli ID card on 7 July 2013. He finally became a legitimate Naturalized citizen of Israel on 7 December 2013.

He resided in Haifa, Israel, with his wife Jozi and son Gaby.

== Club career ==
Boccoli joined Israel's Maccabi Haifa after his former team, Maccabi Ahi Nazareth, dropped to the second division in the 2003–04 season. He won the 2004–05 championship with Haifa. He could play in central midfield and as a winger and can also occupy the "Number 10 position" behind the striker. During 2008, he drew more fouls than any other player in Israeli Premier League. Boccoli was voted "footballer of the year" by the Israeli Premier League players in 2006, after scoring 12 goals, assisting 9 goals and helping Maccabi Haifa to win its third championship in a row and a Toto Cup.

On 24 June 2015, Boccoli retired from playing. He will mostly be known for his 11 years with Maccabi Haifa, there he made 434 caps and scored 39 goals.

== Style of play ==
Boccoli played most of his career as a right winger. In later seasons Boccoli started playing as a defensive midfielder and as a central midfielder.

== Later career ==
Boccoli also speaks Hebrew, and hosted a weekly cooking show on Benny Bashan's radio show called Benny in the Radio on Israeli radio station Galei Tzahal.

He was appointed as a scout for Israeli club Maccabi Haifa, after his retirement as a football player.

== Honours ==
- Israeli Premier League (4):
  - 2004–05, 2005–06, 2008–09, 2010–11
- Toto Cup (2):
  - 2005–06, 2007–08
