= Eyal Meshumar =

Israeli footballer

Eyal Meshumar אייל משומר
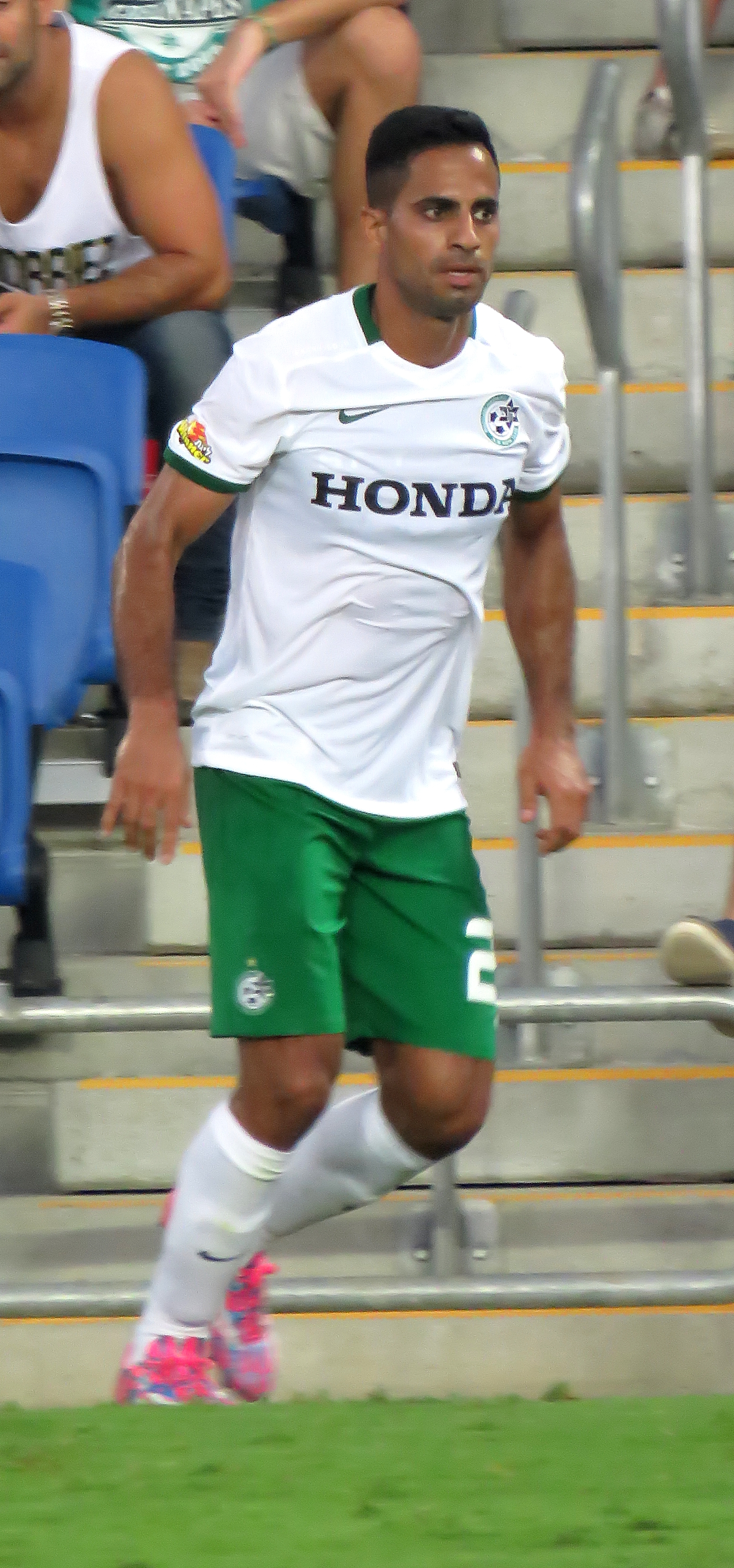
- Meshumar playing for Maccabi Haifa in 2015

Personal information
- Full name: Eyal Meshumar
- Date of birth: August 10, 1983 (age 43)
- Place of birth: Kfar Saba, Israel
- Height: 1.76 m (5 ft 9 1/2 in)
- Position: Right back

Youth career
- Hapoel Kfar Saba

Senior career*
Years	Team	Apps	(Gls)
2000–2006	Hapoel Kfar Saba	92	(7)
2006–2016	Maccabi Haifa	233	(9)
2017	Hapoel Tel Aviv	11	(0)
2017–2018	Hapoel Ashkelon	15	(0)

International career
2004	Israel U21	1	(0)
2007–2014	Israel	10	(0)
- * Club domestic league appearances and goals as of 1 June 2017

Eyal Meshumar (Hebrew: אייל משומר; born 10 August 1983) is an Israeli retired footballer.

== Club career ==
=== Hapoel Kfar Saba ===
Eyal Meshumar growing youth group of Hapoel Kfar Saba, in 2000 came the first team.

=== Maccabi Haifa ===
In 2006, after the passage of Klemi Saban from Maccabi Haifa Romanian team Steaua Bucharest, Maccabi Haifa has decided to sign a 5-year canned in a transaction which has passed Guillermo Israilevich Hapoel Kfar Saba. He subsequently became a permanent player canned composition of Maccabi Haifa and won two titles. In 2009/2010 season with the team climbed Group stage of the Champions League. On 27 July 2011 served as team captain canned game against Maribor Slovenian framework Champions League qualification again wear the captain on other occasions as captain changer.

== International career ==
On 13 October 2007, he began his debut Israel national team, match against Croatia as part of the Euro 2008 qualifiers.

== Career statistics ==
=== International ===
Appearances and goals by national team and year
National team	Year	Apps	Goals
Israel	2007	2	0
Israel	2008	1	0
Israel	2009	1	0
Israel	2010	–	
Israel	2011	–	
Israel	2012	–	
Israel	2013	2	0
Israel	2014	4	0
Total		10	0

== Honours ==
=== Club ===
Hapoel Kfar Saba

- Liga Leumit
  - Winner (1):2004-05

Maccabi Haifa

- Toto Cup
  - Winner (1):2007-08
- Israeli Championships
  - Winner (2): 2008–09, 2010–11
  - Runner-up (2): 2009–10, 2012–13
- Israel State Cup
  - Winner (1): 2016
  - Runner-up (3): 2009, 2011, 2012
