= Shai Maimon =

Israeli footballer

Shai Maimon שי מימון
Personal information
- Full name: Moshe Shai Maimon
- Date of birth: March 18, 1986 (age 40)
- Place of birth: Netanya, Israel
- Height: 1.86 m (6 ft 1 in)
- Position: Center-back

Youth career
- Beitar Nes Tubruk
- Maccabi Haifa

Senior career*
Years	Team	Apps	(Gls)
2003–2012	Maccabi Haifa	61	(2)
2006–2007	→ Maccabi Herzliya (loan)	19	(0)
2009	→ Ironi Ashdod (loan)	14	(0)
2011–2012	→ Maccabi Petah Tikva (loan)	27	(1)
2013–2014	Ironi Ashdod	17	(1)
2014–2015	Maccabi Ahi Nazareth	29	(0)
2015–2016	Ironi Tiberias	30	(0)
2016–2018	Ironi Nesher	43	(2)

International career
2006–2007	Israel U21	20	(0)
2008–2010	Israel	2	(0)
- * Club domestic league appearances and goals

Shai Maimon (Hebrew: שי מימון; born March 18, 1986) is an Israeli football Defender, currently playing in the Liga Leumit for the Ironi Nesher.

Days after he made a move to Maccabi Herzliya in 2007 he acquired a first team place in the club, and also made a great achievement in winning a place in the U-21 championships with Israel, with a win over France.

Maimon is of a Tunisian-Jewish descent.

== Honours ==
- Toto Cup (1):
  - 2006-07
- Israeli Premier League (1):
  - 2010-11
