= Yaniv Katan =

Israeli footballer

Yaniv Katan יניב קטן
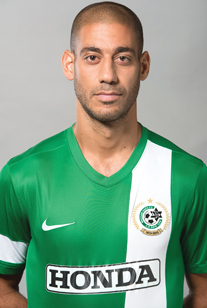
- Katan in 2013

Personal information
- Date of birth: 27 January 1981 (age 45)
- Place of birth: Kiryat Ata, Israel
- Height: 1.85 m (6 ft 1 in)
- Position: Attacking midfielder

Youth career
- 1990–1998: Maccabi Haifa

Senior career*
Years	Team	Apps	(Gls)
1998–2006	Maccabi Haifa	223	(40)
2006	West Ham United	8	(0)
2006–2007	→ Maccabi Haifa (loan)	27	(7)
2007–2014	Maccabi Haifa	239	(39)
Total		472	(79)

International career^{‡}
1998	Israel U17	4	(2)
1998–2003	Israel U21	17	(5)
2000–2010	Israel	31	(5)
- * Club domestic league appearances and goals as of 30 March 2014 ‡ National team caps and goals as of 06:13, 11 February 2008 (UTC)

Yaniv Katan (Hebrew: יניב קטן; born 27 January 1981) is an Israeli retired international footballer who played professionally for Maccabi Haifa, as a forward and winger. He earned 31 caps for Israel, scoring five goals.

== Personal life ==
Katan was born in Kiryat Ata, Israel, and is Jewish.

== Club career ==
In December 2005, Katan signed a four-year contract with West Ham United, where he joined up with Israeli international teammate Yossi Benayoun. The transfer, which was officially completed during the January 2006 transfer window, involved a cut-price fee of £100,000, as Katan had only six months left on his Maccabi contract. He made eight appearances, including six from the bench, for West Ham.

At the end of the 2005–06 season, Katan moved back to Maccabi Haifa in a loan deal, with a view to a permanent move, after Alan Pardew reportedly told him he was no longer in his plans. He returned to Israel and made his loan deal permanent by signing a new four-year deal with Haifa.

After 25 years in Maccabi Haifa, on 19 June 2014, Katan decided to retire from active playing. On 5 April 2015, a farewell ceremony for Katan was held at the Sammy Ofer Stadium on which both Maccabi Haifa's chairman Ya'akov Shahar and Katan led a speech and the fans held a giant flag with Katan's pictures.

== Career statistics ==
=== Club ===
As of 5 May 2014

Club	Season	League		Israeli Cup		Continental		League cup		Total	
Club	Season	Apps	Goals	Apps	Goals	Apps	Goals	Apps	Goals	Apps	Goals
Maccabi Haifa	1998–99	26	1	1	0	4	0	2	2	32	4
Maccabi Haifa	1999–00	34	3	0	0	0	0	0	0	34	3
Maccabi Haifa	2000–01	36	5	4	1	4	1	0	0	39	7
Maccabi Haifa	2001–02	22	5	4	0	1	0	3	0	30	5
Maccabi Haifa	2002–03	32	6	4	1	12	3	11	4	59	14
Maccabi Haifa	2003–04	28	7	2	2	6	2	4	0	40	11
Maccabi Haifa	2004–05	32	8	2	0	3	0	3	1	40	9
Maccabi Haifa	2005–06	15	5	-	-	2	0	1	0	18	5
Maccabi Haifa	Total	225	41	17	4	32	6	24	7	297	58
West Ham United	2005–06	8	0	0	0	—		—		8	0
West Ham United	Total	8	0	0	0	0	0	0	0	8	0
Maccabi Haifa	2006–07	27	7	3	1	12	1	3	0	44	9
Maccabi Haifa	2007–08	31	5	2	1	-	-	6	1	39	7
Maccabi Haifa	2008–09	31	6	5	4	-	-	4	0	40	10
Maccabi Haifa	2009–10	34	7	1	0	9	2	1	0	45	9
Maccabi Haifa	2010–11	27	4	3	0	2	0	1	1	33	5
Maccabi Haifa	2011–12	31	6	3	2	7	2	0	0	41	10
Maccabi Haifa	2012–13	32	4	3	0	-	-	3	1	38	5
Maccabi Haifa	2013–14	26	0	1	0	8	1	-	-	35	1
Maccabi Haifa	Total	239	39	21	8	37	6	18	3	315	56
Career total		472	79	38	11	70	12	42	10	620	114

== Honours ==
Maccabi Haifa

- Israeli Championships
  - Winner (6): 2000–01, 2001–02, 2003–04, 2004–05, 2008–09, 2010–11
  - Runner-up (5): 1999–2000, 2002–03, 2009–10, 2012–13
- Toto Cup
  - Winner (3): 2002–03, 2005–06, 2007–08
- State Cup
  - Runner-up (4): 2002, 2009, 2011, 2012

West Ham United

- FA Cup
  - Runner-up (1): 2006

== See also ==
- List of select Jewish football (association; soccer) players

Sporting positions
Preceded by Arik Benado	Maccabi Haifa F.C. captain 2006–2014	Succeeded by Yossi Benayoun
