= Eyal Golasa =

Israel footballer

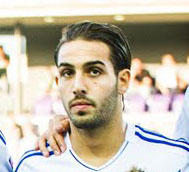
- Eyal Golasa with Israel in 2013

Personal information
- Full name: Eyal Golasa
- Date of birth: 7 October 1991 (age 35)
- Place of birth: Bat Hefer, Israel
- Height: 1.74 m (5 ft 9 in)
- Position: Midfielder

Team information
- Current team: Maccabi Petah Tikva
- Number: 72

Youth career
- 2001–2008: Beitar Nes Tubruk

Senior career*
| Years | Team | Apps | (Gls) |
| 2008–2014 | Maccabi Haifa | 127 | (13) |
| 2014–2016 | PAOK | 35 | (0) |
| 2016–2024 | Maccabi Tel Aviv | 161 | (12) |
| 2024– | Maccabi Petah Tikva | 15 | (0) |

International career^{‡}
| 2007–2008 | Israel U17 | 16 | (3) |
| 2008–2009 | Israel U18 | 2 | (0) |
| 2008–2010 | Israel U19 | 8 | (1) |
| 2008–2013 | Israel U21 | 20 | (1) |
| 2010–2021 | Israel | 17 | (0) |
- * Club domestic league appearances and goals as of 27 June 2025 ‡ National team caps and goals as of 22:41, 25 May 2024 (UTC)

Eyal Golasa (Hebrew: אייל גולסה; born 7 October 1991) is an Israeli professional footballer who plays as a midfielder for Maccabi Petah Tikva.

== Early life ==
Golasa was born in Bat Hefer, Israel, to a family of Mizrahi Jewish (Yemeni-Jewish) descent. His father is former Israeli footballer Avner Golasa.

== Club career ==
=== Maccabi Haifa ===
Golasa came from the highly successful youth system of Beitar Nes Tubruk. In the summer of 2008, he joined Maccabi Haifa. He made his debut in the 2008–09 Israeli Premier League. The midfielder remained a substitute at the beginning of this season until coming off the bench in a UEFA Champions League match against Kazakh champion FK Aktobe on 4 August. Golasa came off the bench, almost singlehandedly turning around a 0–3 deficit as Maccabi claimed a vital 4–3 victory. After leading Maccabi to the playoff stage of the UEFA Champions League, Golasa scored a goal against Red Bull Salzburg, as the Israelis won 3–0. This result enabled the Israelis to return to the group stages of Europe's elite competition. At that time he was being monitored by major European clubs. Websites specializing on football scouting would present him as the new star of the Israeli football.

On 1 February 2010, Golasa had reportedly signed a contract with Italian club S.S. Lazio. Five days later, the club announced the signing on a 4.5-year deal. However, Golasa decided to return to Israel to rejoin Maccabi Haifa and apologised for joining Lazio without informing Maccabi Haifa. Maccabi Haifa confirmed the player was staying and stated the Lazio contract was not valid because they had not been informed of negotiations between Golasa and Lazio.

He was suspended for six months by Maccabi Haifa after agreeing to sign a new contract. He made a verbal agreement but later backed out, causing club boss Ya'akov Shahar to suspend him until the end of the season, after which he was sold to Greek football club PAOK.

=== PAOK ===
On 24 June 2014, Golasa was transferred to the Greek football team PAOK for an undisclosed fee till summer 2017. He could not help the club during the Super League 2014–15 play-offs as he suffered a second degree sprain in the left groin and medical reports stated he would be back in action after four to six weeks.

=== Maccabi Tel Aviv ===
In July 2016, Golasa returned to his native Israel, joining Maccabi Tel Aviv.

== Career statistics ==
=== Club ===
As of 1 June 2022.

| Club | Season | League | | Cup | | Toto Cup | | Europe | | Total | |
| Club | Season | Apps | Goals | Apps | Goals | Apps | Goals | Apps | Goals | Apps | Goals |
|---|---|---|---|---|---|---|---|---|---|---|---|
| Maccabi Haifa | 2008–09 | 27 | 1 | 0 | 0 | 6 | 0 | 0 | 0 | 33 | 1 |
| Maccabi Haifa | 2009–10 | 16 | 5 | 0 | 0 | 4 | 0 | 10 | 2 | 30 | 7 |
| Maccabi Haifa | 2010–11 | 26 | 2 | 3 | 0 | 4 | 1 | 2 | 0 | 35 | 3 |
| Maccabi Haifa | 2011–12 | 25 | 3 | 2 | 0 | 0 | 0 | 12 | 2 | 39 | 5 |
| Maccabi Haifa | 2012–13 | 27 | 2 | 2 | 0 | 3 | 0 | 0 | 0 | 32 | 2 |
| Maccabi Haifa | 2013–14 | 5 | 0 | 0 | 0 | 0 | 0 | 6 | 2 | 11 | 2 |
| Maccabi Haifa | Total | 126 | 13 | 7 | 0 | 17 | 1 | 30 | 6 | 180 | 20 |
| PAOK | 2014–15 | 24 | 0 | 3 | 0 | 0 | 0 | 6 | 0 | 33 | 0 |
| PAOK | 2015–16 | 11 | 0 | 4 | 0 | 0 | 0 | 2 | 0 | 17 | 0 |
| PAOK | Total | 35 | 0 | 7 | 0 | 0 | 0 | 8 | 0 | 50 | 0 |
| Maccabi Tel Aviv | 2016–17 | 21 | 1 | 2 | 0 | 5 | 0 | 4 | 1 | 32 | 2 |
| Maccabi Tel Aviv | 2017–18 | 20 | 0 | 2 | 0 | 3 | 0 | 8 | 0 | 33 | 0 |
| Maccabi Tel Aviv | 2018–19 | 9 | 2 | 0 | 0 | 1 | 0 | 5 | 0 | 15 | 2 |
| Maccabi Tel Aviv | 2019–20 | 30 | 4 | 0 | 0 | 3 | 0 | 0 | 0 | 33 | 4 |
| Maccabi Tel Aviv | 2020–21 | 24 | 2 | 2 | 0 | 0 | 0 | 11 | 0 | 37 | 2 |
| Maccabi Tel Aviv | 2021–22 | 25 | 0 | 4 | 0 | 0 | 0 | 5 | 0 | 34 | 0 |
| Maccabi Tel Aviv | 2022–23 | 0 | 0 | 0 | 0 | 0 | 0 | 0 | 0 | 0 | 0 |
| Maccabi Tel Aviv | Total | 129 | 9 | 10 | 0 | 12 | 0 | 33 | 1 | 184 | 10 |
| Career total | | 290 | 22 | 24 | 0 | 29 | 1 | 71 | 7 | 414 | 30 |

== Honours ==
Maccabi Haifa

- Israeli Premier League (2): 2008–09, 2010–11

Maccabi Tel Aviv

- Israeli Premier League (3): 2018–19, 2019–20, 2023–24
- Toto Cup (4): 2017–18, 2018–19, 2020–21, 2023–24
- Israel Super Cup (2): 2019, 2020
