= 2015–16 Maccabi Haifa F.C. season =

Maccabi Haifa
2015–16 season
- Chairman: Ya'akov Shahar
- Manager: Ronny Levy
- Stadium: Sammy Ofer
- Ligat Ha'Al: 4th
- State Cup: Winners
- Toto Cup: Quarter-final
- Top goalscorer: League: Eliran Atar (10); All: Glynor Plet (15)
- Highest home attendance: 29,544 (vs Maccabi Tel Aviv, 26 September 2015)
- Lowest home attendance: 11,388 (vs Hapoel Tel Aviv, 20 February 2016)
- Average home league attendance: 20,842
Home colours	Away colours	Third colours

The 2015–16 season is Maccabi Haifa's 58th season in Israeli Premier League, and their 34th consecutive season in the top division of Israeli football.

== Club ==
=== Kits ===
- Provider: Nike, Inc.
- Main Sponsor: Honda
- Secondary Sponsor: Pointer and Variety Israel

Home	Away	Third	Fourth

=== Squad information ===
N	Pos.	Nat.	Name	Age	EU	Since	App	Goals	Ends	Transfer fee	Notes
1	GK	(Israel)	Ohad Levita	29	EU	2014/15	15	0	2017	Free	Second nationality: Germany
2	CB	(Israel)	Ayid Habshi	20	Non-EU	2012/13	29	0	2019	Youth system	
4	CB	(Spain)	Marc Valiente	28	EU	2015/16	35	1	2018	€300,000	
5	CB	(Israel)	Shay Ben David	18	Non-EU	2015/16	3	0	N/A	Youth system	
6	CM	(Israel)	Ran Abukarat	26	Non-EU	2013/14	19	0	2016	€350,000	
7	DM	(Israel)	Ofir Kriaf	24	Non-EU	2015/16	17	0	2019	Free	
8	LW	(Israel)	Hen Ezra	26	Non-EU	2012/13	162	24	2016	€850,000	
10	AM	(Poland)	Ludovic Obraniak	30	EU	2015/16	30	4	2017	Free	
11	LW	(Israel)	Ismaeel Ryan	21	Non-EU	2012/13	46	3	2017	Youth system	
12	CB	(Israel)	Orel Dgani	26	Non-EU	2011/12	103	0	2016	€800,000	
13	LB	(Israel)	Taleb Tawatha	23	Non-EU	2009/10	214	7	2019	Youth system	
14	LW	(Israel)	Gil Vermouth	30	Non-EU	2015/16	17	2	2018	Free	
15	AM	(Israel)	Yossi Benayoun (captain)	35	EU	1998/99	245	92	2017	Free	Second nationality: Spain
16	LW	(Israel)	Eliran Atar	28	Non-EU	2014/15	48	18	2018	Free	
17	FW	(Israel)	Shoval Gozlan	22	Non-EU	2012/13	60	8	2019	Youth system	
19	FW	(Israel)	Shahar Hirsh	22	Non-EU	2015/16	21	2	2019	€200,000	
21	CB	(Israel)	Dekel Keinan (vice-captain)	30	Non-EU	2002/03	387	24	2016	€450,000	Originally from youth system
22	GK	(Israel)	Gil Ofek	29	Non-EU	2015/16	0	0	2017	Free	
23	DM	(Israel)	Jaber Ataa	20	Non-EU	2012/13	61	2	2018	Youth system	
24	CF	(Netherlands)	Glynor Plet	28	EU	2015/16	31	15	2017	Free	
25	LB	(Israel)	Sun Menahem	21	Non-EU	2015/16	14	0	2016	Free	
27	RB	(Israel)	Eyal Meshumar	32	Non-EU	2006/07	336	17	2017	€250,000	
28	RB	(Israel)	Yuval Yosipovich	21	Non-EU	2012/13	4	0	2019	Youth system	
29	CF	(Israel)	Shimon Abuhatzira	28	Non-EU	2013/14	45	8	2017	€500,000	
30	CM	(Israel)	Eran Biton	19	Non-EU	2013/14	7	0	2019	Youth system	
31	DM	(Israel)	Neta Lavi	18	Non-EU	2015/16	31	0	2019	Youth system	
32	DM	(Israel)	Kobi Moyal	28	Non-EU	2014/15	18	0	2017	Free	
38	GK	(Serbia)	Vladimir Stojković	32	EU	2014/15	79	0	2017	Free	
52	DM	(Brazil)	Romário Pires	27	Non-EU	2015/16	16	0	2017	€50,000	

- Last updated: 25 May 2016
- Source: mhaifafc.com, Israel Football Association, UEFA Players transfer,
- Ordered by squad number.

=== Current coaching staff ===
Position	Staff
Manager	(Israel) Ronny Levy
Assistant manager	(Israel) Ronen Gabay
Fitness coach	(Israel) Uri Harel
Physiologist	(Israel) Yaron Barak
Goalkeeping coach	(Israel) Giora Antman
Club Administrator	(Israel) Roei Shani
Scouter	(Israel) (Brazil) Gustavo Boccoli
Massageist	(Israel) Alexander Robnachik
Analyst	(Israel) Idan Yonna
Props	(Israel) Zaa'v Yakshin
Logistics Manager	(Israel) Zaa'v Yakshin
Props	(Israel) Shai Bar

Source: mhaifafc.com

== Transfers ==
=== Transfers in ===
No.	Pos.	Nat.	Name	Age	EU	Moving from	Type	Transfer window	Ends	Transfer fee	Source
18	MF	(Montenegro)	Nikola Drinčić	30	EU	(Serbia) Partizan	Transfer	Summer	2019	€300,000	Maccabi Haifa
25	DF	(Israel)	Sun Menahem	21	Non-EU	(Israel) Nir Ramat HaSharon	Transfer	Summer	2017	Free	Maccabi Haifa
4	DF	(Spain)	Marc Valiente	28	EU	(Spain) Real Valladolid	Transfer	Summer	2018	€300,000	Maccabi Haifa
7	DM	(Israel)	Ofir Kriaf	24	Non-EU	(Israel) Beitar Jerusalem	Transfer	Summer	2019	Free	Maccabi Haifa
10	AM	(Poland)	Ludovic Obraniak	30	EU	(Germany) Werder Bremen	Transfer	Summer	2019	Free	Maccabi Haifa
24	FW	(Netherlands)	Glynor Plet	28	EU	(Netherlands) Zulte Waregem	Transfer	Summer	2017	Free	Maccabi Haifa
22	GK	(Israel)	Gil Ofek	29	Non-EU	(Israel) Hapoel Beit She'an	Transfer	Summer	2017	Free	Maccabi Haifa
52	DM	(Brazil)	Romário Pires	27	Non-EU	(Israel) Maccabi Netanya	Transfer	Winter	2016	€50,000	Maccabi Haifa
14	LW	(Israel)	Gil Vermouth	30	Non-EU	(Israel) Maccabi Tel Aviv	Transfer	Winter	2017	Free	Maccabi Haifa

Total expenditure: €600,000

=== Transfers out ===
N	Pos.	Nat.	Name	Age	EU	Moving to	Type	Transfer window	Transfer fee	Source
7	DM	(Israel)	Gustavo Boccoli	37	EU		Retirement	Summer	Free	
4	DM	(Sierra Leone)	Medo	27	EU	Bolton Wanderers (England)	End of Loan	Summer	Free	
3	DF	(Spain)	Abraham Paz	35	EU	Bnei Sakhnin	End of Loan	Summer	Free	
10	AM	(Spain)	Rubén Rayos	29	EU	Sochaux (France)	Transfer	Summer	€500,000	
11	RW	(Israel)	Idan Vered	26	EU	Red Star Belgrade (Serbia)	End of contract	Summer	Free	
14	FW	(Israel)	Weaam Amasha	29	Non-EU	Bnei Sakhnin	End of contract	Summer	Free	
18	LB	(Israel)	Samuel Scheimann	28	EU	Hapoel Tel Aviv	End of contract	Summer	Free	
22	GK	(Israel)	Amir Edri	29	Non-EU		End of contract	Summer	Free	
24	DM	(Spain)	Míchel	29	EU	Qarabağ (Azerbaijan)	End of contract	Summer	Free	
28	FW	(Israel)	Shon Weissman	19	Non-EU	Hapoel Acre	Loan Out	Summer	Free	
—	FW	(Israel)	Mohammad Ghadir	24	Non-EU	Lokeren (Belgium)	Transfer	Summer	€500,000	
5	RB	(Israel)	Elad Gabai	29	Non-EU	Beitar Jerusalem	Release	Summer	€500,000	
17	FW	(Israel)	Alon Turgeman	24	Non-EU	Hapoel Tel Aviv	Loan Out	Winter	Free	
26	DM	(Israel)	Avihai Yadin	29	Non-EU	Hapoel Tel Aviv	Loan Out	Winter	Free	
9	FW	(Israel)	Itay Shechter	29	Non-EU	Beitar Jerusalem	Loan Out	Winter	Free	
18	MF	(Montenegro)	Nikola Drinčić	31	EU		Release	Winter		

Total revenue: €500,000

=== Players out on loan ===
No.	Pos.	Nation	Player
—	GK	(Israel) ISR	Ron Shushan (at Hapoel Nazareth Illit until 30 June 2016)
—	GK	(Israel) ISR	Tal Bomsthein (at Ironi Nesher until 30 June 2016)
—	DF	(Israel) ISR	Baha Halabi (at Hakoah Amidar Ramat Gan until 30 June 2016)
—	DF	(Israel) ISR	Alaa Jafar (at Hapoel Acre until 30 June 2016)
—	MF	(Israel) ISR	Yaniv Brik (at Hapoel Acre until 30 June 2016)
—	MF	(Israel) ISR	Dor Kochav (at Hapoel Acre until 30 June 2016)
—	MF	(Israel) ISR	Adi Konstantinos (at Hapoel Petah Tikva until 30 June 2016)
—	MF	(Israel) ISR	Raz Stain (at Hapoel Katamon Jerusalem until 30 June 2016)

No.	Pos.	Nation	Player
—	MF	(Israel) ISR	Raz Meir (at Bnei Yehuda Tel Aviv until 30 June 2016)
—	MF	(Israel) ISR	Eran Malkin (at Maccabi Herzliya until 30 June 2016)
—	MF	(Israel) ISR	Avihai Yadin (at Hapoel Tel Aviv until 30 June 2016)
—	FW	(Israel) ISR	Dor Hugi (at Maccabi Petah Tikva until 30 June 2016)
—	FW	(Israel) ISR	Or Eiloz (at Hapoel Ra'anana until 30 June 2016)
—	FW	(Israel) ISR	Mohammed Kalibat (at Maccabi Petah Tikva until 30 June 2016)
—	FW	(Israel) ISR	Alon Turgeman (at Hapoel Tel Aviv until 30 June 2016)
—	FW	(Israel) ISR	Itay Shechter (at Beitar Jerusalem until 30 June 2016)

== Pre-season and friendlies ==
Win Draw Loss Postponed

7 July 2015 Training	Maccabi Haifa	1 – 0	Hapoel Nazareth Illit	Haifa
17:30	Hirsh 46'	Report		Stadium: Kfar Galim Training Ground; Referee: Guy Bergar

9 July 2015 Training	Maccabi Haifa	4 – 0	Hapoel Katamon	Haifa
17:30	Yadin 34'; Atar 42' (pen.); Turgeman 67'; Benayoun 84'	Report		Stadium: Kfar Galim Training Ground; Referee: Aohd Asulin

12 July 2015 Training	Maccabi Haifa	1 – 1	Hapoel Acre	Haifa
17:30	Gozlan 38'	Report	Tzemah 46'	Stadium: Kfar Galim Training Ground

16 July 2015 Training Camp	Maccabi Haifa (Israel)	9 – 0	(Austria) FC Pinzgau Saalfelden	Saalfelden, Austria
18:00	Tawatha 18'; Shechter 26', 27'; Ryan 40'; Gozlan 71', 78'; Hirsh 72'; Benayoun 88'; Turgeman 89'	Report		Stadium: Sportplatz Bürgerau

18 July 2015 Training Camp	Maccabi Haifa (Israel)	2 – 0	(Uzbekistan) Lokomotiv Tashkent	Saalfelden, Austria
18:30	Yadin (yellow card); Shechter (yellow card); Hirsh 58'; Jaber 68'	Report		Stadium: Sportplatz Bürgerau

20 July 2015 Training Camp	Maccabi Haifa (Israel)	1 – 0	(England) Norwich City	Kufstein, Austria
19:30	Turgeman 39'; Drinčić (yellow card) 90'; Tawatha (yellow card)	Report		Stadium: Kufstein-Arena

23 July 2015 Training Camp	Maccabi Haifa (Israel)	1 – 1	(Turkey) Rizespor	Achenkirch, Austria
19:30	Shechter 22'; Menahem (yellow card) 65'	Report	Kweuke 87' (pen.)	Stadium: Sportplatz Bürgerau

29 July 2015 Training	Maccabi Haifa	5 – 2	Hapoel Nazareth Illit	Haifa
19:00	Hirsh; Turgeman; Shechter; Benayoun		Yaniv Brik; Yaniv Deri	Stadium: Kfar Galim Training Ground; Referee: Giora Antman and Snir Zchria

17 August 2015 Training	Maccabi Haifa	3 – 1	Ironi Ramat HaSharon	Haifa
18:30	Atar; Valiente	Report		Stadium: Kfar Galim Training Ground

17 September 2015 Training	Maccabi Haifa	1 – 0	Hapoel Jerusalem	Haifa
	Atar	Report		Stadium: Kfar Galim Training Ground

== Competitions ==
=== Overall ===
Updated as of 25 May 2016

Competition	Started round	Final position / round	First match	Last match
Ligat Ha'Al	–	4th	22 August 2015	21 May 2016
State Cup	Round of 32	Winner	13 January 2016	24 May 2016
Toto Cup	Group stage	Quarter-final	1 August 2015	15 December 2015

=== Overview ===
Updated as of 25 May 2016

Competition	Record							
Competition	G	W	D	L	GF	GA	GD	Win %
Ligat Ha'Al	36	14	11	11	45	42	+3	38.89
State Cup	6	5	1	0	13	5	+8	83.33
Toto Cup	6	4	1	1	9	4	+5	66.67
Total	48	23	13	12	67	51	+16	47.92

== Ligat Ha'Al ==
=== Regular season ===
Win Draw Loss

22 August 2015 1	Maccabi Haifa	0 – 3	Bnei Yehuda Tel Aviv	Haifa
20:00	Ryan (yellow card) 63'; Keinan (yellow card) 66'; Shechter (yellow card) 76'	Report	Doubai 30'; Buzaglo 37'; Galván 60'; Hadad (yellow card) 66'; Raz Meir (yellow card) 72'	Stadium: Sammy Ofer Stadium; Attendance: 22,453; Referee: Eitan Shmuelevitz

29 August 2015 2	Hapoel Kfar Saba	1 – 0	Maccabi Haifa	Kfar Saba
17:45	Mavis Tchibota 79'; Papadopoulos (yellow card) 89'	Report	Shechter (yellow card) 32', (penalty missed) 79'; Turgeman (yellow card) 51'; Dgani (yellow card) 90'; Ezra (yellow card) 90'; Gozlan (yellow card) 90'	Stadium: Levita Stadium; Attendance: 5,400; Referee: Orel Greenfeld

12 September 2015 3	Maccabi Haifa	0 – 0	Bnei Sakhnin	Haifa
17:45	Drinčić (red card) 31'; Valiente (yellow card) 81'; Plet (red card) 90+4'	Report	Ottman (yellow card) 18'; Ihab Shami (yellow card) 90+2'	Stadium: Sammy Ofer Stadium; Attendance: 18,540; Referee: Roei Rainsriber

21 September 2015 4	Hapoel Be'er Sheva	0 – 0	Maccabi Haifa	Be'er Sheva
20:55	Soares (yellow card) 61'	Report	Tawatha (red card) 2'; Shechter (yellow card) 3'; Atar (yellow card) 36'; Meshumar (yellow card) 83'; Yadin (yellow card) 83'	Stadium: Turner Stadium; Attendance: 16,000; Referee: Eitan Shmuelevitz

26 September 2015 5	Maccabi Haifa	0 – 2	Maccabi Tel Aviv	Haifa
20:05	Obraniak (yellow card) 2'; Menahem (yellow card) 87'; Meshumar (yellow card) 90'	Report	Dasa (yellow card) 16'; García (yellow card) 57'; Tibi (yellow card) 70'; Ben Basat 81', (yellow card) 90'; Dor Peretz 90+2'	Stadium: Sammy Ofer Stadium; Attendance: 29,544; Referee: Eli Hacmon

3 October 2015 6	Hapoel Ra'anana	0 – 2	Maccabi Haifa	Netanya
17:45	Babayev (yellow card) 30'; Guy Lipka (yellow card) 44'; Shabtay (yellow card) 88'	Report	Dgani (yellow card) 48'; Gozlan (yellow card) 56'; Atar 77' (pen.); Obraniak (yellow card) 79'; Benayoun (yellow card) 86'; Stojković (yellow card) 89'; Ezra 90+3'	Stadium: Netanya Stadium; Attendance: 7,000; Referee: Menashe Mashiah

18 October 2015 7	Ironi Kiryat Shmona	2 – 0	Maccabi Haifa	Kiryat Shmona
20:15	Gutiérrez (yellow card) 49'; Elkayam (yellow card) 68'; Eden Shamir 81'; Mizrahi 90+3'	Report	Dgani (yellow card) 27'; Shechter (red card) 87'; Valiente (yellow card) 90+4'	Stadium: Municipal Stadium; Attendance: 5,000; Referee: Roei Rainsriber

24 October 2015 8	Maccabi Haifa	4 – 0	Hapoel Acre	Haifa
20:00	Plet 20'; Valiente 28'; Kriaf (yellow card) 27'; Atar 57'; Obraniak 75'	Report	Samuel Gilmor (yellow card) 7'; Kochav (yellow card) 35'	Stadium: Sammy Ofer Stadium; Attendance: 18,640; Referee: Eli Hacmon

31 October 2015 9	Maccabi Petah Tikva	1 – 1	Maccabi Haifa	Petah Tikva
19:15	Guy Melamed 41'; Idan Shemesh (yellow card) 68'; Kalibat (yellow card) 85'; Kanyuk (yellow card) 90'	Report	Menahem (yellow card) 13'; Kriaf (red card) 48'; Valiente (red card) 58'; Stojković (yellow card) 58'; Atar (yellow card) 70', (goal) 90' (pen.)	Stadium: HaMoshava Stadium; Attendance: 9,000; Referee: Daniel Bar Natan

8 November 2015 10	Maccabi Haifa	0 – 2	Beitar Jerusalem	Haifa
20:55	Drinčić (yellow card) 17'	Report	Einbinder (yellow card) 38'; Gabay 85', (yellow card) 86'; Atzili 90'	Stadium: Sammy Ofer Stadium; Attendance: 29,386; Referee: Alon Yefet

23 November 2015 11	Hapoel Tel Aviv	0 – 3	Maccabi Haifa	Netanya
20:55	Mihai Pintilii (yellow card) 80'	Report	Ryan (yellow card) 23'; Keinan 28', 56'; Plet 49'; Drinčić (yellow card) 53'; Obraniak (yellow card) 81'	Stadium: Netanya Stadium; Attendance: 16,000; Referee: Menashe Mashiah

28 November 2015 12	Maccabi Haifa	1 – 0	Maccabi Netanya	Haifa
17:30	Keinan (yellow card) 81'; Benayoun 86', (yellow card) 87'; Stojković (yellow card) 90+3'	Report	Hassan (yellow card) 37'; Mischenko (yellow card) 60'; Yarin Ziv (yellow card) 80'	Stadium: Sammy Ofer Stadium; Attendance: 19,700; Referee: Erez Papeir

7 December 2015 13	Hapoel Haifa	2 – 4	Maccabi Haifa	Haifa
20:55	Stojković 5' (o.g.); Roash (red card) 12'; Swisa 18' (pen.); El-Khatib (yellow card) 21'; Korać (yellow card) 84'	Report	Plet (yellow card) 17', (goal) 90+3'; Keinan (yellow card) 19', (goal) 88'; Atar 41'; Ryan 44'	Stadium: Sammy Ofer Stadium; Attendance: 16,750; Referee: Eli Hacmon

12 December 2015 14	Bnei Yehuda Tel Aviv	0 – 0	Maccabi Haifa	Tel Aviv
15:15	Falah (yellow card) 15'; Buzaglo (yellow card) 77'; Nworuh (yellow card) 88'	Report	Neta Lavi (yellow card) 13'; Valiente (yellow card) 64'; Atar (yellow card) 89'; Dgani (yellow card) 90+2'	Stadium: Bloomfield Stadium; Attendance: 8,000; Referee: Roei Rainsriber

20 December 2015 15	Maccabi Haifa	1 – 1	Hapoel Kfar Saba	Haifa
20:15	Habshi (yellow card) 47'; Obraniak 58', (yellow card) 79'; Atar (yellow card) 90+1'	Report	Papadopoulos 20'; Badash (yellow card) 52'; Cohen (yellow card) 64'	Stadium: Sammy Ofer Stadium; Attendance: 17,146; Referee: Erez Papeir

26 December 2015 16	Bnei Sakhnin	1 – 2	Maccabi Haifa	Sakhnin
17:00	Ottman (yellow card) 15'; Azulay 68'	Report	Benayoun 5'; Atar 38'; Dgani (yellow card) 58'; Ataa (yellow card) 81'	Stadium: Doha Stadium; Attendance: 4,000; Referee: Liran Liany

4 January 2016 17	Maccabi Haifa	1 – 1	Hapoel Be'er Sheva	Haifa
20:55	Plet 12', (red card) 87'; Obraniak (yellow card) 23'; Dgani (yellow card) 30'; Stojković (yellow card) 51'; Tawatha (yellow card) 83'	Report	Buzaglo 35', (yellow card) 70'	Stadium: Sammy Ofer Stadium; Attendance: 28,653; Referee: Menashe Mashiah

10 January 2016 18	Maccabi Tel Aviv	2 – 1	Maccabi Haifa	Tel Aviv
20:55	Zahavi 32', (penalty missed) 49'; Ben Haim 36'; García (yellow card) 68'	Report	Habshi (yellow card) 24'; Obraniak (yellow card) 64'; Benayoun 70'	Stadium: Bloomfield Stadium; Attendance: 14,000; Referee: Alon Yefet

17 January 2016 19	Maccabi Haifa	2 – 0	Hapoel Ra'anana	Haifa
20:30	Benayoun (penalty missed) 10', 11', (yellow card) 25'; Plet 62'	Report	Babayev (yellow card) 16'; Nimni (red card) 42'	Stadium: Sammy Ofer Stadium; Attendance: 16,655; Referee: Avraham Ben-Sahlom

24 January 2016 20	Maccabi Haifa	0 – 1	Ironi Kiryat Shmona	Haifa
20:10		Report	Amutu 7'; Elkayam (yellow card) 67'; Bruno (yellow card) 72'; Tchalisher (yellow card) 77'	Stadium: Sammy Ofer Stadium; Attendance: 11,505; Referee: Gal Leibovich

31 January 2016 21	Hapoel Acre	1 – 1	Maccabi Haifa	Acre
20:30	Dayan (yellow card) 4'; Kopitović 8', (yellow card) 23'; Dylan Seys (yellow card) 21'; Kasoum (yellow card) 50'	Report	Plet 23' (pen.)	Stadium: Municipal Stadium; Attendance: 4,500; Referee: Ziv Adler

6 February 2016 22	Maccabi Haifa	4 – 0	Maccabi Petah Tikva	Haifa
17:00	Ataa (yellow card) 34'; Benayoun 45+2'; Atar 47', 65'; Vermouth 79'	Report		Stadium: Sammy Ofer Stadium; Attendance: 15,248; Referee: Erez Papeir

15 February 2016 23	Beitar Jerusalem	3 – 0	Maccabi Haifa	Petah Tikva
20:55	Shechter 32'; Rukavytsya 51'; Einbinder 83', (yellow card) 86'	Report	Obraniak (yellow card) 15'; Valiente (yellow card) 29'; Tawatha (yellow card) 44'; Atar (yellow card) 86'; Keinan (yellow card) 90+1'	Stadium: HaMoshava Stadium; Attendance: 12,000; Referee: Eitan Shmuelevitz

20 February 2016 24	Maccabi Haifa	0 – 0	Hapoel Tel Aviv	Netanya
20:00	Pires (yellow card) 70'; Keinan (yellow card) 87'; Habshi (yellow card) 88'	Report	Schoenfeld (yellow card) 29'; Bumba (yellow card) 42'; Reichert (yellow card) 87'	Stadium: Netanya Stadium; Attendance: 11,388; Referee: Roei Rainsriber

27 February 2016 25	Maccabi Netanya	0 – 3	Maccabi Haifa	Netanya
17:30	Lugasi (yellow card) 20'; Lingane (yellow card) 36'; Fedoul (yellow card) 50'; Cohen (yellow card) 60'	Report	Keinan 6'; Plet (yellow card) 20', (goal) 57'; Atar 51' (pen.)	Stadium: Netanya Stadium; Attendance: 5,150; Referee: Avraham Ben-Sahlom

6 March 2016 26	Maccabi Haifa	3 – 2	Hapoel Haifa	Haifa
20:30	Plet 17'; Jaber 40'; Vermouth (yellow card) 62'; Fishler 76' (o.g.); Meshumar (yellow card) 78'; Keinan (yellow card) 90'	Report	Dora (yellow card) 42'; Hisham Kiwan 48', (yellow card) 90'; Tawatha 68' (o.g.); Baha (yellow card) 82'; Maman (red card) 90'	Stadium: Sammy Ofer Stadium; Attendance: 22,453; Referee: Roei Rainsriber

==== Regular season table ====
Pos	Team	Pld	W	D	L	GF	GA	GD	Pts	Qualification or relegation
2	Maccabi Tel Aviv	26	19	4	3	59	20	+39	61	Qualification for the championship round
3	Beitar Jerusalem	26	15	6	5	38	19	+19	51	Qualification for the championship round
4	Maccabi Haifa	26	10	8	8	33	25	+8	38	Qualification for the championship round
5	Bnei Sakhnin	26	10	6	10	32	25	+7	36	Qualification for the championship round
6	Hapoel Ra'anana	26	10	6	10	29	31	−2	36	Qualification for the championship round

Source: Israel Football Association, Soccerway
Rules for classification: 1) Points; 2) Goal difference; 3) Matches won; 4) Goals scored; 5) Head-to-head points; 6) Head-to-head goal difference; 7) Head-to-head goals scored; 8) Play-off.

=== Play-off ===
14 March 2016 27	Beitar Jerusalem	3 – 2	Maccabi Haifa	Jerusalem
20:55	Einbinder 5'; Rukavytsya 7'; Valpoort 47', (yellow card) 62'	Report	Benayoun 13'; Keinan 37'; Neta Lavi (red card) 44'; Ryan (yellow card) 45'; Stojković (yellow card) 62'; Meshumar (yellow card) 65'	Stadium: Teddy Stadium; Attendance: 17,000; Referee: Eli Hacmon

20 March 2016 28	Hapoel Ra'anana	3 – 0	Maccabi Haifa	Netanya
20:30	Nimni (yellow card) 14'; Mihelič 32' (pen.); Kangwa (yellow card) 36'; Mbola (yellow card) 39'; Shabtay 60', (yellow card) 69'; Badash 90'	Report	Pires (yellow card) 31'; Kriaf (red card) 65'; Atar (yellow card) 70'	Stadium: Netanya Stadium; Attendance: 2,000; Referee: Oren Saminian

2 April 2016 29	Maccabi Haifa	3 – 3	Bnei Sakhnin	Haifa
17:45	Paz 7' (o.g.); Plet 77'; Atar 80'	Report	Azulay 42', 66'; Khalaila (yellow card) 60'; Kanadil (yellow card) 77'; Eldar Hasanović (yellow card) 80'; Georginho 83'	Stadium: Sammy Ofer Stadium; Attendance: 16,461; Referee: Daniel Bar-Natan

9 April 2016 30	Hapoel Be'er Sheva	1 – 1	Maccabi Haifa	Be'er Sheva
20:00	Sahar (yellow card) 41', (goal) 83' (pen.); Bitton (yellow card) 63'	Report	Benayoun (yellow card) 35'; Atar 78'; Pires (yellow card) 82'; Obraniak (yellow card) 82'; Plet (yellow card) 87'; Stojković (yellow card) 88'	Stadium: Turner Stadium; Attendance: 15,534; Referee: Ziv Adler

17 April 2016 31	Maccabi Haifa	0 – 0	Maccabi Tel Aviv	Haifa
20:55	Pires (yellow card) 9'; Neta Lavi (yellow card) 12'; Ryan (yellow card) 37'; Keinan (yellow card) 50'	Report	Rajković (yellow card) 48'; Micha (yellow card) 81'	Stadium: Sammy Ofer Stadium; Attendance: 24,453; Referee: Liran Liany

24 April 2016 32	Maccabi Haifa	1 – 0	Beitar Jerusalem	Haifa
20:30	Obraniak 21'; Kriaf (yellow card) 23'; Keinan (yellow card) 65'	Report	Shechter (yellow card) 56'; Rueda (red card) 64'; D. Gabay (yellow card) 65'; Einbinder (yellow card) 87'	Stadium: Sammy Ofer Stadium; Attendance: 28,262; Referee: Avraham Ben-Sahlom

30 April 2016 33	Maccabi Haifa	2 – 0	Hapoel Ra'anana	Haifa
17:45	Ezra 25', 62', (penalty missed) 45'; Neta Lavi (yellow card) 75'	Report	I.Levy (yellow card) 31'; Yanko (yellow card) 45'; Mihelič (yellow card) 75'; L.Levi (yellow card) 82'	Stadium: Sammy Ofer Stadium; Attendance: 15,022; Referee: Amit Elankva

7 May 2016 34	Bnei Sakhnin	0 – 1	Maccabi Haifa	Sakhnin
17:45	Kachuba (yellow card) 9'; Amasha (yellow card) 76'	Report	Habshi (yellow card) 53'; Obraniak (yellow card) 62'; Hirsh 70'; Neta Lavi (yellow card) 77'; Benayoun (yellow card) 82'; Stojković (yellow card) 90'; Valiente (yellow card) 90+1'; Tawatha (yellow card) 90+2'	Stadium: Doha Stadium; Attendance: 6,000; Referee: Eli Hacmon

14 May 2016 35	Maccabi Haifa	2 – 1	Hapoel Be'er Sheva	Haifa
19:45	Obraniak (yellow card) 22'; Menahem (yellow card) 30'; Ezra (yellow card) 33', (goal) 48'; Keinan (yellow card) 38'; Meshumar (yellow card) 59', (goal) 90+4'; Pires (yellow card) 73'	Report	Bitton (yellow card) 17'; Radi (yellow card) 36'; Nwakaeme (yellow card) 38'; Melikson 41'; Hoban (yellow card) 72'	Stadium: Sammy Ofer Stadium; Attendance: 23,900; Referee: Menashe Mashiah

21 May 2016 36	Maccabi Tel Aviv	6 – 0	Maccabi Haifa	Tel Aviv
21:00	Zahavi 28', 48' (pen.), 61'; Ben Haim 56'; Avi Rikan (yellow card) 58'; García 64'; Medunjanin 66'; Ben Basat (yellow card) 87'	Report	Keinan (yellow card) 47'; Ryan (yellow card) 67'	Stadium: Bloomfield Stadium; Attendance: 14,000; Referee: Orel Grinfeld

==== Championship round table ====
Pos	Team	Pld	W	D	L	GF	GA	GD	Pts	Qualification
1	Hapoel Be'er Sheva (C)	36	25	8	3	66	24	+42	83	Qualification for the Champions League second qualifying round
2	Maccabi Tel Aviv	36	24	9	3	76	24	+52	81	Qualification for the Europa League first qualifying round
3	Beitar Jerusalem (Note: Beitar Jerusalem deducted two points because of racial slurs by their fans.)	36	18	6	12	46	37	+9	58	Qualification for the Europa League first qualifying round
4	Maccabi Haifa	36	14	11	11	45	42	+3	53	Qualification for the Europa League second qualifying round (Note: Maccabi Haifa qualified for the Europa League second qualifying round by winning the 2015–16 Israel State Cup.)
5	Bnei Sakhnin	36	13	9	14	46	40	+6	48	
6	Hapoel Ra'anana	36	11	9	16	38	48	−10	42	

Source: Israel Football Association, Soccerway
Rules for classification: 1) Points; 2) Goal difference; 3) Matches won; 4) Goals scored; 5) Head-to-head points; 6) Head-to-head goal difference; 7) Head-to-head goals scored; 8) Play-off.
(C) Champions

=== Results summary ===
Overall								Home						Away					
Pld	W	D	L	GF	GA	GD	Pts	W	D	L	GF	GA	GD	W	D	L	GF	GA	GD
36	14	11	11	45	42	+3	53	8	6	4	24	16	+8	6	5	7	21	26	−5

Last updated: 22 May 2016.
Source: Competitive matches

=== Results by round ===
Round	1	2	3	4	5	6	7	8	9	10	11	12	13	14	15	16	17	18	19	20	21	22	23	24	25	26	27	28	29	30	31	32	33	34	35	36
Ground	H	A	H	A	H	A	A	H	A	H	A	H	A	A	H	A	H	A	H	H	A	H	A	H	A	H	A	A	H	A	H	H	H	A	H	A
Result	L	L	D	D	L	W	L	W	D	L	W	W	W	D	D	W	D	L	W	L	D	W	L	D	W	W	L	L	D	D	D	W	W	W	W	L
Position	14	14	14	14	14	14	14	12	11	13	11	8	6	6	6	6	6	6	5	6	5	5	5	6	6	4	4	6	6	5	5	5	5	4	4	4

Updated to match(es) played on 22 May 2016. Source: Competitive Matches
A = Away; H = Home; W = Win; D = Draw; L = Loss

== State Cup ==
=== Round of 32 ===
13 January 2016 Round of 32	Maccabi Haifa	2 – 1	Beitar Jerusalem	Haifa
21:00	Benayoun 16'; Ryan 23'; Gozlan (yellow card) 59'; Stojković (yellow card) 87'	Report	Cohen 9'; Gabay (yellow card) 73'	Stadium: Sammy Ofer Stadium; Attendance: 20,606; Referee: Roei Rainsriber

=== Round of 16 ===
27 January 2016 Round of 16	Maccabi Haifa	1 – 0	Hapoel Haifa	Haifa
21:00	Plet 5'; Neta Lavi (yellow card) 21'; Shay Ben David (yellow card) 40'	Report	Dora (yellow card) 23'; Pinheiro (yellow card) 71'	Stadium: Sammy Ofer Stadium; Attendance: 18,201; Referee: Liran Liany

=== Quarter final ===
9 February 2016 First leg	Bnei Yehuda Tel Aviv	2 – 2	Maccabi Haifa	Tel Aviv
21:00	Mori (yellow card) 29'; Azuz (yellow card) 53'; Gal Tzruya 69'; Galván 74'; Stav Finish (yellow card) 78'	Report	Meshumar (yellow card) 44'; Atar 55' (pen.), (yellow card) 56'; Plet 84'	Stadium: Bloomfield Stadium; Attendance: 7,000; Referee: Liran Liany

1 March 2016 Second leg	Maccabi Haifa	4 – 1 (6 – 3 agg.)	Bnei Yehuda Tel Aviv	Haifa
21:00	Meshumar (yellow card) 19'; Ataa (yellow card) 22'; Vermouth 34'; Plet 43', 72'; Benayoun 56'	Report	Grabli (yellow card) 13'; Galván 31', (penalty missed) 78'; Mršić (yellow card) 41'; Doubai (yellow card) 52'; Stav Finish (yellow card) 55'	Stadium: Sammy Ofer Stadium; Attendance: 11,682; Referee: Eli Hacmon

=== Semi final ===
20 April 2016 Semi Final	Hapoel Be'er Sheva	1 – 3	Maccabi Haifa	Haifa
20:30	Radi (yellow card) 66'; Nwakaeme 87'	Report	Glynor Plet 29', 31'; Stojković (yellow card) 55'; Keinan (yellow card) 63'; Tawatha (yellow card) 71'; Atar 80', (yellow card) 89'	Stadium: Sammy Ofer Stadium; Attendance: 26,200; Referee: Eitan Shmuelevitz

=== Final ===
24 May 2016 Final	Maccabi Haifa	1 – 0	Maccabi Tel Aviv	Jerusalem
20:50	Obraniak 36', (yellow card) 56'; Keinan (yellow card) 47'; Ryan (yellow card) 87'; Pires (yellow card) 90'	Report	Micha (yellow card) 32'; Medunjanin (yellow card) 90'	Stadium: Teddy Stadium; Attendance: 32,000; Referee: Roi Reinshreiber

== Toto Cup ==
=== Group stage ===
Pos	Team	Pld	W	D	L	GF	GA	GD	Pts
1	Maccabi Haifa (A)	4	4	0	0	8	2	+6	12
2	Ironi Kiryat Shmona (A)	4	3	0	1	6	3	+3	9
3	Hapoel Haifa (A)	4	2	0	2	6	3	+3	6
4	Bnei Sakhnin	4	0	1	3	3	8	−5	1
5	Hapoel Acre	4	0	1	3	2	9	−7	1

Updated to match(es) played on 28 October 2015. Source: football.org.il (in Hebrew)
Rules for classification: 1st points; 2nd goal difference; 3rd matches won; 4th goals scored; 5th head-to-head; 6th decision match
(A) Advanced to the quarter finals

1 August 2015 1	Maccabi Haifa	2 – 1	Hapoel Haifa	Haifa
19:00	Drinčić (yellow card) 17'; Ryan (yellow card) 54'; Yadin (yellow card) 56'; Turgeman 67'; Meshumar 71'; Benayoun (yellow card) 86'	Report	Swisa (penalty missed) 18', 49'; Dabour (yellow card) 67'	Stadium: Sammy Ofer Stadium; Attendance: 22,457; Referee: Eli Hakmon

5 August 2015 2	Bnei Sakhnin	0 – 1	Maccabi Haifa	Akko
19:00		Report	Benayoun 87'; Shechter (yellow card) 90'	Stadium: Municipal Stadium; Attendance: 1,500; Referee: Erez Papeir

11 August 2015 4	Maccabi Haifa	3 – 0	Hapoel Acre	Haifa
20:50	Turgeman 19'; Ezra (yellow card) 34', (goal) 90+1'; Ataa 90+3'	Report	Shaban (yellow card) 36'; Mishaelof (yellow card) 64'	Stadium: Sammy Ofer Stadium; Attendance: 12,246; Referee: Roei Rainsriber

28 October 2015 5	Ironi Kiryat Shmona	1 – 2	Maccabi Haifa	Kiryat Shmona
20:15	Abudi (yellow card) 20'; Eran Azrad (yellow card) 65'; Ostvind 78' (pen.)	Report	Hirsh 34'; Turgeman 65' (pen.), (yellow card) 76'; Shay Ben David (yellow card) 77'	Stadium: Municipal Stadium; Attendance: 300; Referee: Liran Vaksberger

=== Knockout phase ===
==== Quarter-final ====
1 December 2015 First Leg	Maccabi Haifa	0 – 1	Maccabi Petah Tikva	Netanya
20:30	Tawatha (yellow card) 81'; Neta Lavi (yellow card) 78'; Shechter (red card) 81'; Gozlan (yellow card) 90+6'	Report	Hugi 6'	Stadium: Netanya Stadium; Attendance: 1,000; Referee: Ziv Adler

15 December 2015 Second Leg	Maccabi Petah Tikva	1 – 1 (2 – 1 agg.)	Maccabi Haifa	Ashdod
20:30	Oded Gavish 65'; Nitzan (yellow card) 86'	Report	Shoval Gozlan 17'; Keinan (yellow card) 62'	Stadium: Yud-Alef Stadium; Attendance: 400; Referee: Liran Liany

== Statistics ==
=== Squad statistics ===
Updated on 25 May 2016

			Ligat Ha'Al					State Cup					Toto Cup					Total				
Nation	No.	Name		GS	Min.	Goal	Assist		GS	Min.	Goal	Assist		GS	Min.	Goal	Assist		GS	Min.	Goal	Assist
Goalkeepers
(Israel)	1	Ohad Levita	5	5	466	0	0	2	2	187	0	0	4	4	376	0	0	11	11	1,029	0	0
(Israel)	22	Gil Ofek	0	0	0	0	0	0	0	0	0	0	0	0	0	0	0	0	0	0	0	0
(Serbia)	38	Vladimir Stojković	31	31	2,906	0	0	4	4	377	0	0	2	2	187	0	0	37	37	3,470	0	0
Defenders
(Israel)	2	Ayid Habshi	15	8	1,010	0	0	3	2	181	0	0	3	3	283	0	0	21	13	1,474	0	0
(Spain)	4	Marc Valiente	30	30	2,368	1	0	4	4	374	0	0	1	0	17	0	0	35	34	2,759	1	0
(Israel)	5	Shay Ben David	1	1	94	0	0	1	1	93	0	0	1	1	93	0	0	3	3	280	0	0
(Israel)	12	Orel Dgani	23	21	1,977	0	1	4	3	291	0	1	4	4	397	0	1	31	28	2,642	0	3
(Israel)	13	Taleb Tawatha	27	27	2,377	0	3	5	5	451	0	2	5	4	381	0	2	37	36	3,209	0	7
(Israel)	21	Dekel Keinan	31	30	2,766	5	0	5	5	472	0	0	6	5	471	0	0	42	40	3,709	5	0
(Israel)	25	Sun Menahem	10	8	817	0	0	1	0	20	0	0	3	2	74	0	0	14	10	911	0	0
(Israel)	27	Eyal Meshumar	20	18	1,662	1	2	3	3	282	0	0	3	3	280	1	0	26	24	2,224	2	2
(Israel)	28	Yuval Yosipovich	2	0	42	0	0	0	0	0	0	0	2	2	189	0	0	4	2	231	0	0
Midfielders
(Israel)	6	Ran Abukarat	0	0	0	0	0	0	0	0	0	0	0	0	0	0	0	0	0	0	0	0
(Israel)	7	Ofir Kriaf	15	11	885	0	0	2	1	107	0	0	0	0	0	0	0	17	12	992	0	0
(Israel)	8	Hen Ezra	25	12	1,280	4	2	5	3	269	0	1	5	5	338	1	1	35	20	1,887	5	3
(Poland)	10	Ludovic Obraniak	26	25	2,203	3	3	4	4	350	1	0	0	0	0	0	0	30	29	2,553	4	3
(Israel)	11	Ismaeel Ryan	24	15	1,427	1	4	5	1	189	1	1	5	4	386	0	2	34	20	2,002	2	7
(Israel)	14	Gil Vermouth	14	10	857	1	4	3	3	237	1	1	0	0	0	0	0	17	13	1,094	2	5
(Israel)	15	Yossi Benayoun	29	20	1,898	6	4	5	5	376	2	1	5	2	297	1	1	39	27	2,571	9	6
(Israel)	23	Ataa Jaber	18	17	1,467	1	2	4	4	355	0	1	6	4	367	1	1	28	25	2,189	2	4
(Israel)	30	Eran Biton	1	0	19	0	0	0	0	0	0	0	0	0	0	0	0	1	0	19	0	0
(Israel)	31	Neta Lavi	22	22	1,901	0	1	6	6	564	0	0	3	3	264	0	0	31	31	2,729	0	1
(Israel)	32	Kobi Moyal	4	2	253	0	0	1	0	7	0	0	1	1	57	0	0	6	3	317	0	0
(Israel)	34	Yam Cohen	0	0	0	0	0	0	0	0	0	0	1	0	36	0	0	0	1	36	0	0
(Israel)	35	Eitan Velblum	0	0	0	0	0	0	0	0	0	0	1	0	25	0	0	0	0	0	0	0
(Brazil)	52	Romário Pires	13	8	805	0	0	3	2	209	0	0	0	0	0	0	0	16	10	1,014	0	0
Forwards
(Israel)	16	Eliran Atar	25	21	1,818	10	2	4	2	261	2	1	3	3	195	0	0	32	26	2,274	12	3
(Israel)	17	Shoval Gozlan	15	6	137	0	0	2	2	137	0	0	4	1	211	1	0	21	9	995	1	0
(Israel)	19	Shahar Hirsh	14	0	275	1	0	3	0	69	0	0	5	2	142	1	0	22	3	486	2	0
(Netherlands)	24	Glynor Plet	25	23	2,124	9	4	4	4	317	6	3	2	1	45	0	0	31	28	2,486	15	5
(Israel)	26	Gal Katabi	0	0	0	0	0	1	0	1	0	0	0	0	0	0	0	1	0	1	0	0
(Israel)	29	Shimon Abuhatzira	0	0	0	0	0	0	0	0	0	0	0	0	0	0	0	0	0	0	0	0
Players who no longer play for Maccabi Haifa
(Israel)	9	Itay Shechter	10	6	567	0	0	0	0	0	0	0	5	3	236	0	0	15	9	803	0	0
(Israel)	17	Alon Turgeman	7	3	382	0	0	0	0	0	0	0	6	4	389	3	0	13	7	771	3	0
(Montenegro)	18	Nikola Drinčić	13	11	999	0	1	0	0	0	0	0	5	3	263	0	0	18	14	1,292	0	1
(Israel)	26	Avihay Yadin	3	3	217	0	0	0	0	0	0	0	3	3	203	0	0	6	6	420	0	0

=== Goals ===
Updated on 25 May 2016

Rank	Player	Position	Ligat Ha'Al	State Cup	Toto Cup	Total
1	(Netherlands) Glynor Plet	FW	9	6	0	15
2	(Israel) Eliran Atar	FW	10	2	0	12
3	(Israel) Yossi Benayoun	MF	6	2	1	9
4	(Israel) Dekel Keinan	DF	5	0	0	5
5	(Israel) Hen Ezra	MF	4	0	1	4
5	(Poland) Ludovic Obraniak	MF	3	1	0	4
6	(Israel) Alon Turgeman	FW	0	0	3	3
7	(Israel) Ismaeel Ryan	MF	1	1	0	2
7	(Israel) Gil Vermouth	MF	1	1	0	2
7	(Israel) Ataa Jaber	MF	1	0	1	2
7	(Israel) Shahar Hirsh	FW	1	0	1	2
7	(Israel) Eyal Meshumar	DF	1	0	1	2
8	(Spain) Marc Valiente	DF	1	0	0	1
8	(Israel) Shoval Gozlan	FW	0	0	1	1
Own goals			2	1	0	3
Total			45	13	9	67

=== Assists ===
Updated on 25 May 2016

Rank	Player	Position	Ligat Ha'Al	State Cup	Toto Cup	Total
1	(Israel) Ismaeel Ryan	MF	4	1	2	7
1	(Israel) Taleb Tawatha	DF	3	2	2	7
2	(Israel) Yossi Benayoun	MF	4	1	1	6
3	(Netherlands) Glynor Plet	FW	4	1	0	5
3	(Israel) Gil Vermouth	MF	4	1	0	5
4	(Israel) Ataa Jaber	MF	2	1	1	4
4	(Israel) Hen Ezra	MF	2	1	1	4
5	(Israel) Eliran Atar	FW	2	1	0	3
5	(Israel) Orel Dgani	DF	1	1	1	3
5	(Poland) Ludovic Obraniak	MF	3	0	0	3
6	(Israel) Eyal Meshumar	DF	2	0	0	2
7	(Israel) Neta Lavi	MF	1	0	0	1
7	(Montenegro) Nikola Drinčić	MF	1	0	0	1
Total			30	10	8	51

=== Clean sheets ===
Last updated on 25 May 2016

Rank	Pos.	No.	Name	Ligat Ha'Al	State Cup	Toto Cup	Total
1	GK	38	(Serbia) Vladimir Stojković	13	1	1	15
2	GK	1	(Israel) Ohad Levita	2	1	1	4
Total				15	2	2	19

=== Disciplinary record (Ligat Ha'Al and State Cup) ===
Last updated on 25 May 2016

No.	Pos	Nat	Name	Ligat Ha'Al			State Cup			Total			Suspended
No.	Pos	Nat	Name	Booked	(yellow card) (yellow-red card)	Sent off (straight red)	Booked	(yellow card) (yellow-red card)	Sent off (straight red)	Booked	(yellow card) (yellow-red card)	Sent off (straight red)	
52	MF	(Brazil)	Romário Pires	13	1					14			
21	DF	(Israel)	Dekel Keinan	10	1		1			12			
10	MF	(Poland)	Ludovic Obraniak	10	1					11			
38	GK	(Serbia)	Vladimir Stojković	7			2			9			
16	FW	(Israel)	Eliran Atar	6			2			8			
27	DF	(Israel)	Eyal Meshumar	5			2			7			
12	DF	(Israel)	Orel Dgani	6						6			
11	MF	(Israel)	Ismaeel Ryan	5	1					6			
15	MF	(Israel)	Yossi Benayoun	5						5			
4	DF	(Spain)	Marc Valiente	5		1				5		1	
31	DF	(Israel)	Neta Lavi	4		1	1			5		1	
2	DF	(Israel)	Ayid Habshi	4						4			
13	DF	(Israel)	Taleb Tawatha	3		1	1			4		1	
24	FW	(Netherlands)	Glynor Plet	3		2				3		2	
23	MF	(Israel)	Ataa Jaber	2			1			3			
17	FW	(Israel)	Shoval Gozlan	2			1			3			
7	MF	(Israel)	Ofir Kriaf	3	2					3	2		
30	MF	(Israel)	Eran Biton	2						2			
25	DF	(Israel)	Sun Menahem	2						2			
8	MF	(Israel)	Hen Ezra	2						2			
14	MF	(Israel)	Gil Vermouth	1						1			

=== Disciplinary record (Toto Cup) ===
No.	Nation	Pos.	Name		
No.	Nation	Pos.	Name	Booked	Sent off (straight red)
15	(Israel)	MF	Yossi Benayoun	1	0
21	(Israel)	DF	Dekel Keinan	1	0
27	(Israel)	DF	Eyal Meshumar	1	0
8	(Israel)	MF	Hen Ezra	1	0
13	(Israel)	DF	Taleb Tawatha	1	0
25	(Israel)	DF	Sun Menahem	1	0
11	(Israel)	MF	Ismaeel Ryan	1	0
17	(Israel)	FW	Shoval Gozlan	1	0
31	(Israel)	MF	Neta Lavi	1	0
18	(Montenegro)	MF	Nikola Drinčić	1	0
9	(Israel)	FW	Itay Shechter	0	1

=== Penalties for ===
Updated on 27 February 2016

Date	Penalty Taker	Scored	Opponent	Competition
29 August 2015	Itay Shechter	No	Hapoel Kfar Saba	Ligat Ha'Al
3 October 2015	Eliran Atar	Yes	Hapoel Ra'anana	Ligat Ha'Al
28 October 2015	Alon Turgeman	Yes	Ironi Kiryat Shmona	Toto Cup
31 October 2015	Eliran Atar	Yes	Maccabi Petah Tikva	Ligat Ha'Al
17 January 2016	Yossi Benayoun	No	Hapoel Ra'anana	Ligat Ha'Al
31 January 2016	Glynor Plet	Yes	Hapoel Acre	Ligat Ha'Al
9 February 2016	Eliran Atar	Yes	Bnei Yehuda Tel Aviv	State Cup
27 February 2016	Eliran Atar	Yes	Maccabi Netanya	Ligat Ha'Al
30 April 2016	Hen Ezra	No	Hapoel Ra'anana	Ligat Ha'Al

=== Overall ===
Updated on 25 May 2016

	Total	Home	Away	Natural
Games played	48	24	22	2
Games won	23	13	8	2
Games drawn	13	6	7	0
Games lost	12	5	7	0
Biggest win	4 – 0 vs Hapoel Acre; 4 – 0 vs Maccabi Petah Tikva	4 – 0 vs Hapoel Acre; 4 – 0 vs Maccabi Petah Tikva	3 – 0 vs Hapoel Tel Aviv; 3 – 0 vs Maccabi Netanya	3 – 1 vs Hapoel Be'er Sheva
Biggest loss	0 – 6 Maccabi Tel Aviv	0 – 3 vs Bnei Yehuda Tel Aviv	0 – 6 Maccabi Tel Aviv	
Biggest win (League)	4 – 0 vs Hapoel Acre	4 – 0 vs Hapoel Acre	3-0 vs Hapoel Tel Aviv; 3 – 0 vs Maccabi Netanya	N/A
Biggest loss (League)	0 – 6 Maccabi Tel Aviv	0-3 vs Bnei Yehuda Tel Aviv	0 – 6 Maccabi Tel Aviv	N/A
Biggest win (Cup)	4 – 1 vs Bnei Yehuda Tel Aviv	4 – 1 vs Bnei Yehuda Tel Aviv	–	3 – 1 vs Hapoel Be'er Sheva
Biggest loss (Cup)	-	-	-	-
Biggest win (Toto)	3 – 0 vs Hapoel Acre	3 – 0 vs Hapoel Acre	1 – 0 vs Bnei Sakhnin; 2-1 vs Ironi Kiryat Shmona	
Biggest loss (Toto)	0 – 1 vs Maccabi Petah Tikva	0 – 1 vs Maccabi Petah Tikva		
Clean sheets	19	11	7	1
Goals scored	67	36	27	4
Goals conceded	51	18	32	1
Goal difference	+16	+18	-5	+3
Average GF per game	1.4	1.5	1.23	2
Average GA per game	1.06	0.75	1.45	0.5
Yellow cards	132	56	68	8
Red cards	9	4	5	
Most appearances	Dekel Keinan (42)	–		
Most minutes played	Dekel Keinan (3,709)	–		
Most goals	(Netherlands) Glynor Plet (15)	–		
Penalties for	8	1	7	
Penalties against	9	3	6	
Winning rate	47.92%	50%	36.36%	100%

Last updated: 25 May 2016
Source: Competitive matches
