= List of Israeli football transfers winter 2020–21 =

This is a list of Israeli football transfers for the 2020–21 Winter Transfer Window.

== Ligat Ha'Al ==
=== Beitar Jerusalem ===
In:

No.	Pos.	Nation	Player
—	MF	MNE	Marko Janković (from (Italy) SPAL)

Out:

No.	Pos.	Nation	Player
—	MF	ISR	Dan Einbinder (to Hapoel Tel Aviv)
—	MF	ISR	Shalom Edri (to Hapoel Hadera)
—	MF	ISR	Liran Rotman (on loan to Hapoel Hadera)
—	FW	ISR	Gil Ben Shlush (on loan to Hapoel Bnei Lod)

=== Bnei Sakhnin ===
In:

No.	Pos.	Nation	Player
—	DF	AUT	Lukas Spendlhofer (from (Italy) Ascoli)
—	MF	ISR	Ismaeel Ryan (from (Turkey) Adanaspor)
—	FW	JAM	Dane Kelly (from (United States) Charlotte Independence)
—	FW	ISR	Muflah Shalata (on loan from Maccabi Tel Aviv)

Out:

No.	Pos.	Nation	Player
—	GK	ISR	Tomer Haran (on loan to Hapoel Afula)
—	DF	COL	Oswaldo Henríquez (to (Colombia) Deportivo Pasto)
—	MF	ISR	Bashir Bahjat (on loan to Hapoel Ra'anana)
—	MF	ISR	Nasim Abu Younes (on loan to Hapoel Kafr Kanna)
—	MF	ISR	Daniel Dean Twizer (to Hapoel Ra'anana)
—	FW	GUY	Emery Welshman (to Hapoel Ra'anana)
—	FW	ISR	Mohammed Khalaila (on loan to Hapoel Kaukab)
—	FW	ISR	Moti Malka (to Hapoel Nof HaGalil)
—	FW	ISR	Mohammed Awad (to Ihud Bnei Majd al-Krum)

=== Bnei Yehuda ===
In:

No.	Pos.	Nation	Player
—	DF	ISR	Obeida Khattab (from Hapoel Hadera)
—	DF	ISR	Raz Nachmias (from Hapoel Haifa)
—	MF	USA	George Fochive (from Hapoel Kfar Saba)
—	MF	ISR	Amit Glazer (on loan from Maccabi Tel Aviv)
—	FW	ISR	Almog Buzaglo (from Hapoel Haifa)
—	FW	MNE	Fatos Bećiraj (from (Poland) Wisła Kraków)

Out:

No.	Pos.	Nation	Player
—	MF	ISR	Elian Ruhana (to Hapoel Iksal)
—	FW	ISR	Amir Khalaila (to Hapoel Rishon LeZion)

=== F.C. Ashdod ===
In:

No.	Pos.	Nation	Player
—	GK	ISR	Omer Egozi (from Hapoel Kfar Shalem)
—	MF	ISR	Ramzi Safouri (on loan from Hapoel Be'er Sheva)
—	FW	GHA	Zakaria Mugeese (from (Ghana) Techiman Eleven Wonders)

Out:

No.	Pos.	Nation	Player
—	GK	ISR	Ron Shushan (to Hapoel Rishon LeZion)
—	DF	ISR	Nir Bardea (to (Hungary) Honvéd)
—	FW	ISR	Sagiv Yehezkel (to Hapoel Be'er Sheva)

=== Hapoel Be'er Sheva ===
In:

No.	Pos.	Nation	Player
—	DF	ISR	Hatem Abd Elhamed (from (Scotland) Celtic)
—	FW	BRA	Farley (from (United Arab Emirates) Fujairah)
—	FW	ISR	Sagiv Yehezkel (from F.C. Ashdod)

Out:

No.	Pos.	Nation	Player
—	DF	ISR	Noam Gamon (on loan to Hapoel Ra'anana)
—	DF	ISR	Shir Tzedek (to Maccabi Netanya)
—	MF	ISR	Ramzi Safouri (on loan to F.C. Ashdod)

=== Hapoel Hadera ===
In:

No.	Pos.	Nation	Player
—	DF	ISR	Ido Levy (from Hapoel Haifa)
—	DF	ISR	Max Grechkin (from (Ukraine) Zorya Luhansk, his player card still belongs to Beitar Jerusalem)
—	DF	ISR	Raz Nachmias (from Hapoel Haifa)
—	MF	NGA	Muhammed Usman (from (Kazakhstan) Shakhter Karagandy)
—	MF	ISR	Shalom Edri (from Beitar Jerusalem)
—	MF	ISR	Liran Rotman (on loan to Beitar Jerusalem)
—	MF	CIV	Sékou Doumbia (Free transfer)
—	FW	ISR	Yahav Afriat (from Hapoel Kfar Saba)

Out:

No.	Pos.	Nation	Player
—	DF	ISR	Obeida Khattab (to Bnei Yehuda)
—	DF	ISR	Sa'ar Kalderon (to Maccabi Ahi Nazareth)
—	DF	ISR	Sahar Dabah (on loan to Hapoel Rishon LeZion)
—	DF	ISR	Raz Nachmias (to Bnei Yehuda)
—	MF	ISR	Reef Mesika (to Maccabi Bnei Reineh)
—	MF	CIV	Yaya Meledje (to Hapoel Petah Tikva)
—	MF	ISR	Omer Lakou (to Hapoel Kfar Saba, his player card still belongs to Ironi Kiryat Shmona)
—	MF	ISR	Amit Glazer (to Bnei Yehuda, his player card still belongs to Maccabi Tel Aviv)
—	FW	ISR	Karem Arshid (to Sektzia Nes Tziona)

=== Hapoel Haifa ===
In:

No.	Pos.	Nation	Player
—	FW	ISR	Alon Turgeman (from Austria Wien)

Out:

No.	Pos.	Nation	Player
—	DF	ISR	Raz Nachmias (to Hapoel Hadera)
—	DF	ISR	Ido Levy (to Hapoel Hadera)
—	MF	ISR	Bar Cohen (to Beitar Tel Aviv Bat Yam, his player card still belongs to Maccabi Tel Aviv)
—	FW	ISR	Almog Buzaglo (to Bnei Yehuda)
—	FW	ISR	Raz Stain (to Hapoel Tel Aviv)
—	FW	ISR	Dudu Alterovich (on loan to Hapoel Petah Tikva)

=== Hapoel Kfar Saba ===
In:

No.	Pos.	Nation	Player
—	MF	LTU	Domantas Šimkus (from (Lithuania) FK Žalgiris)
—	MF	ISR	Omer Lakou (on loan from Ironi Kiryat Shmona)
—	MF	ISR	Timothy Muzie (on loan from Maccabi Haifa)
—	MF	ENG	Jamie Hopcutt (from (Sweden) GIF Sundsvall)
—	MF	KOS	Florent Hasani (from (Hungary) Diósgyőri VTK)

Out:

No.	Pos.	Nation	Player
—	DF	ISR	Maor Gerassi (to Hapoel Jerusalem)
—	MF	ISR	Sagi Dror (to Hapoel Petah Tikva)
—	MF	USA	George Fochive (to Bnei Yehuda)
—	MF	NGA	Michael Omoh (to Maccabi Ahi Nazareth)
—	FW	ISR	Yahav Afriat (to Hapoel Hadera)
—	FW	GUI	Kerfala Cissoko (Free agent)

=== Hapoel Tel Aviv ===
In:

No.	Pos.	Nation	Player
—	DF	ISR	Ben Bitton (on loan from Hapoel Be'er Sheva)
—	MF	ISR	Dan Einbinder (from Beitar Jerusalem)
—	MF	ISR	Ofek Bitton (from Sektzia Nes Tziona)
—	MF	ISR	Lidor Cohen (from (Georgia (country)) Dila Gori)
—	FW	ISR	Shlomi Azulay (from (Romania) Astra Giurgiu)
—	FW	ISR	Raz Stain (from Hapoel Haifa)

Out:

No.	Pos.	Nation	Player
—	MF	ISR	Ofek Ovadia (on loan to Sektzia Nes Tziona)
—	MF	ISR	Ilay Tamam (on loan to Hapoel Rishon LeZion)
—	MF	PAN	Armando Cooper (to Maccabi Petah Tikva)
—	MF	ISR	Itamar Efrat (on loan to Hapoel Kfar Shalem)
—	MF	ISR	Shavit Mazal (on loan to Hapoel Kfar Shalem)
—	FW	ISR	Eden Hershkovitz (to (Cyprus) Karmiotissa)
—	FW	GEO	Levan Kutalia (to Hapoel Umm al-Fahm)
—	FW	ISR	Shahar Hirsh (to Hapoel Ramat Gan)

=== Ironi Kiryat Shmona ===
In:

No.	Pos.	Nation	Player

Out:

No.	Pos.	Nation	Player
—	DF	ISR	Yarin Dado (on loan to Maccabi Ahi Nazareth)

=== Maccabi Haifa ===
In:

No.	Pos.	Nation	Player
—	MF	ISR	Omer Atzili (from (Cyprus) APOEL)
—	FW	ISR	Mohammed Awaed (loan return from (Poland) Lech Poznań)

Out:

No.	Pos.	Nation	Player
—	DF	ISR	Shay Ben David (on loan to Hapoel Afula)
—	MF	ISR	Timothy Muzie (on loan to Hapoel Kfar Saba)
—	MF	ISR	Ihab El Abed (on loan to Maccabi Petah Tikva)

=== Maccabi Netanya ===
In:

No.	Pos.	Nation	Player
—	DF	ISR	Shir Tzedek (from Hapoel Be'er Sheva)
—	FW	CIV	Aboubacar Junior Doumbia (from (Finland) KPV Kokkola)
—	FW	CIV	Fernand Gouré (Unknown)

Out:

No.	Pos.	Nation	Player
—	GK	ISR	Golan Elkaslasy (on loan to Hapoel Kfar Shalem)
—	DF	NOR	Akinshola Akinyemi (Free Agent)
—	DF	ISR	Moshe Mula (on loan to Maccabi Ahi Nazareth)
—	MF	ISR	Yarin Sharabi (on loan to Hapoel Ra'anana)
—	FW	ISR	Yonas Malede (to (Belgium) Gent)

=== Maccabi Petah Tikva ===
In:

No.	Pos.	Nation	Player
—	MF	PAN	Armando Cooper (from Hapoel Tel Aviv)
—	MF	ISR	Ihab El Abed (on loan from Maccabi Haifa)
—	FW	ISR	Yoel Abuhatzira (Free transfer)
—	FW	ENG	Morgan Ferrier (from (England) Tranmere Rovers)

Out:

No.	Pos.	Nation	Player
—	FW	AZE	Eli Babayev (to Hapoel Ramat Gan)
—	FW	BIH	Asmir Suljić (to (Hungary) Diósgyőri VTK)

=== Maccabi Tel Aviv ===
In:

No.	Pos.	Nation	Player
—	DF	POR	André Geraldes (from (Cyprus) APOEL)

Out:

No.	Pos.	Nation	Player
—	DF	ISR	Ben Bitton (to Hapoel Tel Aviv, his player card still belongs to Hapoel Be'er Sheva)
—	DF	ISR	Ran Vaturi (to Sektzia Nes Tziona, previously loaned to Beitar Tel Aviv Bat Yam)
—	FW	ISR	Tal Turgeman (to Hapoel Ra'anana)

== Liga Leumit ==
=== Beitar Tel Aviv Bat Yam ===
In:

No.	Pos.	Nation	Player
—	DF	ISR	Ohad Atia (from Hapoel Ashkelon)
—	MF	ISR	Bar Cohen (on loan from Maccabi Tel Aviv)

Out:

No.	Pos.	Nation	Player
—	DF	ISR	Alon Shtrosberg (to Hapoel Rishon LeZion, his player card still belongs to Maccabi Tel Aviv)
—	DF	ISR	Ran Vaturi (to Sektzia Nes Tziona, previously loaned from Maccabi Tel Aviv)
—	FW	ISR	Muflah Shalata (to Bnei Sakhnin, his player card still belongs to Maccabi Tel Aviv)

=== F.C. Kafr Qasim ===
In:

No.	Pos.	Nation	Player
—	DF	CIV	Doueugui Mala (Free transfer)
—	MF	ISR	Maharan Radi (Free transfer)
—	FW	ISR	Mohammed Khatib (on loan from Maccabi Ahi Nazareth)
—	FW	ISR	Hisham Layous (from (Ukraine) Rukh Lviv)
—	FW	VEN	Carlos Espinoza (from (Ecuador) Olmedo)
—	FW	ISR	Meir Cohen (on loan from Hapoel Ramat Gan)

Out:

No.	Pos.	Nation	Player
—	MF	ISR	Itay Elkaslasy (to Hapoel Kfar Shalem)
—	MF	ISR	Yarden Cohen (to Maccabi Ahi Nazareth)
—	FW	ISR	Yuval Avidor (to Hapoel Marmorek)
—	FW	ISR	Nir Sharon (to Maccabi Sha'arayim)
—	FW	ISR	Mor Fadida (to Sektzia Nes Tziona)

=== Hapoel Acre ===
In:

No.	Pos.	Nation	Player
—	FW	ISR	Omer Buaron (from Hapoel Ramat Gan)
—	FW	ISR	Mahran Lala (from F.C. Holon Yermiyahu)

Out:

No.	Pos.	Nation	Player
—	FW	ISR	Loai Halaf (loan return to Ironi Nesher)

=== Hapoel Afula ===
In:

No.	Pos.	Nation	Player
—	GK	ISR	Tomer Haran (on loan from Bnei Sakhnin)
—	DF	ISR	Shay Ben David (on loan from Maccabi Haifa)
—	DF	ISR	Shalev Avitan (on loan from Hapoel Be'er Sheva)
—	MF	CRO	Antonini Čulina (Free transfer)
—	FW	ISR	Alon Buzorgi (from Maccabi Ahi Nazareth)

Out:

No.	Pos.	Nation	Player
—	MF	ISR	Moha Badir (to Maccabi Herzliya)
—	MF	ISR	Shinhar Morad (on loan to Maccabi Ahi Iksal)
—	FW	BRA	Maurício Cordeiro (to Hapoel Jerusalem)

=== Hapoel Iksal ===
In:

No.	Pos.	Nation	Player
—	DF	ISR	Daniel Tesker (from F.C. Haifa Robi Shapira)
—	MF	ISR	Elian Ruhana (from Bnei Yehuda)
—	MF	ISR	Yaniv Brik (from Sektzia Nes Tziona)
—	FW	ISR	Mohammed Kalibat (from Hapoel Umm al-Fahm)

Out:

No.	Pos.	Nation	Player
—	MF	ISR	Ibrahim Jawabry (to Sektzia Nes Tziona, his player card still belongs to Maccabi Haifa)
—	MF	BRA	Renan (to (Brazil) Confiança, previouslt loaned to (Belgium) Roeselare)

=== Hapoel Jerusalem ===
In:

No.	Pos.	Nation	Player
—	DF	ISR	Maor Gerassi (from Hapoel Kfar Saba)
—	DF	ISR	Ohad Rabinovic (from Hapoel Ramat Gan, his player card still belongs to F.C. Ashdod)
—	FW	BRA	Maurício Cordeiro (from Hapoel Afula)

Out:

No.	Pos.	Nation	Player
—	MF	ISR	Eden Dahan (to Maccabi Bnei Reineh)

=== Hapoel Kfar Shalem ===
In:

No.	Pos.	Nation	Player
—	GK	ISR	Golan Elkaslasy (on loan from Maccabi Netanya)
—	DF	ISR	Zach Baleli (from Hapoel Nof HaGalil)
—	MF	ISR	Itay Elkaslasy (from F.C. Kafr Qasim)
—	MF	ISR	Itamar Efrat (on loan from Hapoel Tel Aviv)
—	MF	ISR	Shavit Mazal (on loan from Hapoel Tel Aviv)
—	FW	ISR	Elior Seiderre (from Hapoel Umm al-Fahm)
—	FW	ISR	Roy Melika (from (Georgia (country)) FC Dila Gori)

Out:

No.	Pos.	Nation	Player
—	GK	ISR	Omer Egozi (to F.C. Ashdod)
—	DF	ISR	Dmytro Entin (to Hakoah Amidar Ramat Gan)
—	DF	ISR	Noy Haddad (to F.C. Dimona)
—	DF	ISR	Tal Kidron (to Hapoel Bnei Lod)

=== Hapoel Nof HaGalil ===
In:

No.	Pos.	Nation	Player
—	MF	ISR	Eitan Velblum (on loan from Bnei Yehuda)
—	FW	ISR	Dovev Gabay (from Hapoel Umm al-Fahm)
—	FW	ISR	Moti Malka (from Bnei Sakhnin)

Out:

No.	Pos.	Nation	Player
—	DF	ISR	Zach Baleli (to Hapoel Kfar Shalem)
—	FW	ISR	Samir Farhud (to Hapoel Rishon LeZion)

=== Hapoel Petah Tikva ===
In:

No.	Pos.	Nation	Player
—	DF	ISR	Idan Weintraub (from Hakoah Amidar Ramat Gan)
—	MF	ISR	Sagi Dror (from Hapoel Kfar Saba)
—	FW	ISR	Dudu Alterovich (on loan from Hapoel Haifa)
—	FW	ISR	Aner Shechter (from Sektzia Nes Tziona)
—	FW	ISR	Lior Berkovic (from Hapoel Ra'anana)
—	FW	ISR	Gal Assulin (from Hapoel Rishon LeZion)

Out:

No.	Pos.	Nation	Player
—	MF	ISR	Yam Ben Yehuda (to Hakoah Amidar Ramat Gan)
—	MF	ISR	Daniel Schwarzboim (to Sektzia Nes Tziona)
—	MF	ISR	Bar Yeruham (to Hapoel Ramat Gan)
—	FW	ISR	Gal Tzroya (to F.C. Dimona)

=== Hapoel Ra'anana ===
In:

No.	Pos.	Nation	Player
—	DF	ISR	Roy Amos (from Hapoel Migdal HaEmek)
—	DF	ISR	Noam Gamon (on loan from Hapoel Be'er Sheva)
—	DF	ISR	David Tiram (Free transfer)
—	MF	ISR	Bashir Bahjat (on loan from Bnei Sakhnin)
—	MF	ISR	Yarin Sharabi (on a loan from Maccabi Netanya)
—	MF	ISR	Daniel Dean Twizer (from Bnei Sakhnin)
—	FW	ISR	Tal Turgeman (from Maccabi Tel Aviv)
—	FW	GUY	Emery Welshman (from Bnei Sakhnin)

Out:

No.	Pos.	Nation	Player
—	DF	ISR	Gal Barel (to Maccabi Bnei Reineh)
—	DF	ISR	Ido Ben Yosef (to Hapoel Bnei Lod)
—	MF	ISR	Guy Cohen (to F.C. Holon Yermiyahu)
—	FW	NGA	Benjamin Kuku (to Hapoel Ramat HaSharon)
—	FW	ISR	Lior Berkovic (to Hapoel Petah Tikva)

=== Hapoel Ramat Gan ===
In:

No.	Pos.	Nation	Player
—	DF	ISR	Ori Tza'adon (Free transfer)
—	DF	ISR	Adi Nimni (Free transfer)
—	MF	ISR	Yam Cohen (on loan from Maccabi Haifa)
—	MF	ISR	Bar Yeruham (from Hapoel Petah Tikva)
—	FW	AZE	Eli Babayev (from Maccabi Petah Tikva)
—	FW	ISR	Shahar Hirsh (from Hapoel Tel Aviv)
—	FW	ISR	Mamoon Qashoa (from (Austria) Mauerwerk)

Out:

No.	Pos.	Nation	Player
—	DF	ISR	Ohad Rabinovich (to Hapoel Jerusalem, his player card still belongs to F.C. Ashdod)
—	MF	ISR	Vladimir Broun (to Sektzia Nes Tziona)
—	MF	ISR	Ofir Benbenisti (on loan to Hapoel Umm al-Fahm)
—	FW	ISR	Idan Vaknin (to Maccabi Kabilio Jaffa, his player card still belongs to Maccabi Petah Tikva)
—	FW	ISR	Omer Buaron (to Hapoel Acre)

=== Hapoel Ramat HaSharon ===
In:

No.	Pos.	Nation	Player
—	DF	ISR	Viki Kahlon (Free transfer)
—	FW	NGA	Benjamin Kuku (from Hapoel Ra'anana)

Out:

No.	Pos.	Nation	Player
—	MF	ISR	Yam Cohen (to Hapoel Ramat Gan, his player card still belongs to Maccabi Haifa)
—	MF	ISR	Sfouan Hilo (loan return to Maccabi Ahi Nazareth)
—	MF	ISR	Naor Cohen (to Agudat Sport Ashdod)
—	FW	ISR	Mohammed Khatib (to F.C. Kafr Qasim)
—	FW	ISR	Murad Haj (to Ironi Tiberias)
—	FW	ISR	Mohamed Khatib (to F.C. Kafr Qasim, his player card still belongs to Maccabi Ahi Nazareth)

=== Hapoel Rishon LeZion ===
In:

No.	Pos.	Nation	Player
—	GK	ISR	Ron Shushan (from F.C. Ashdod)
—	DF	ISR	Alon Shtrosberg (on loan from Maccabi Tel Aviv)
—	DF	ISR	Sahar Dabah (on loan from Hapoel Hadera)
—	MF	ISR	Ilay Tamam (on loan from Hapoel Tel Aviv)
—	FW	ISR	Samir Farhud (from Hapoel Nof HaGalil)
—	FW	ISR	Amir Khalaila (from Bnei Yehuda)

Out:

No.	Pos.	Nation	Player
—	DF	ISR	Ilan Shaulsky (to Hapoel Umm al-Fahm)
—	FW	ISR	Gal Assulin (to Hapoel Petah Tikva)

=== Hapoel Umm al-Fahm ===
In:

No.	Pos.	Nation	Player
—	DF	ISR	Ilan Shaulski (from Hapoel Rishon LeZion)
—	MF	ISR	Naor Abudi (from (Armenia) Lori)
—	MF	ISR	Ofir Benbenisti (on loan from Hapoel Ramat Gan)
—	FW	ISR	Murad Abu Anza (Free transfer)
—	FW	GEO	Levan Kutalia (from Hapoel Tel Aviv)

Out:

No.	Pos.	Nation	Player
—	DF	ISR	Niran Rotshtein (to Maccabi Tamra)
—	MF	ISR	Vitali Ganon (to Agudat Sport Ashdod)
—	FW	ISR	Elior Seiderre (to Hapoel Kfar Shalem)
—	FW	ISR	Mohammed Kalibat (to Hapoel Iksal)
—	FW	ISR	Dovev Gabay (to Hapoel Nof HaGalil)
—	FW	ISR	Murad Abu Anza (to Maccabi Tamra)

=== Maccabi Ahi Nazareth ===
In:

No.	Pos.	Nation	Player
—	DF	ISR	Sa'ar Kalderon (from Hapoel Hadera)
—	DF	ISR	Yarin Dado (on loan from Ironi Kiryat Shmona)
—	DF	ISR	Moshe Mula (on loan from Maccabi Netanya)
—	MF	ISR	Yarden Cohen (from F.C. Kafr Qasim)
—	MF	ISR	Sfouan Hilo (loan return from Hapoel Ramat HaSharon)
—	MF	GRE	Timis Bardis (from (Greece) Ialysos)

Out:

No.	Pos.	Nation	Player
—	DF	ISR	Yahya Khatib (on loan to Maccabi Ironi Yafa)
—	MF	ISR	Yuval Shabtay (to Maccabi Tamra)
—	MF	ISR	Kasem Sindiani (on loan to Bnei Bir al-Maksur)
—	MF	ISR	Mohammed Abdullah (on loan to Maccabi Ironi Yafa)
—	FW	ISR	Alon Buzorgi (to Hapoel Afula)
—	FW	ISR	Ibrahim Abu Ahmed (on loan to Hapoel Bu'eine)

=== Sektzia Nes Tziona ===
In:

No.	Pos.	Nation	Player
—	DF	ISR	Ran Vaturi (from Maccabi Tel Aviv)
—	MF	ISR	Vladimir Broun (from Hapoel Ramat Gan)
—	MF	ISR	Daniel Schwarzboim (from Hapoel Petah Tikva)
—	MF	ISR	Ofek Ovadia (on loan from Hapoel Tel Aviv)
—	MF	ISR	Ibrahim Jawabry (from Hapoel Iksal, his player card still belongs to Maccabi Haifa)
—	FW	ISR	Karem Arshid (from Hapoel Hadera)
—	FW	ISR	Mor Fadida (from F.C. Kafr Qasim)

Out:

No.	Pos.	Nation	Player
—	DF	ISR	Shalev Avitan (to Hapoel Afula, his player card still belongs to Hapoel Be'er Sheva)
—	MF	ISR	Ofek Bitton (to Hapoel Tel Aviv)
—	MF	ISR	Yaniv Brik (to Hapoel Iksal)
—	FW	ISR	Aner Shechter (to Hapoel Petah Tikva)
—	FW	ISR	Ilay Hen (to F.C. Holon Yermiyahu, his player card still belongs to Bnei Yehuda)
