= Dekel Keinan =

Israeli footballer

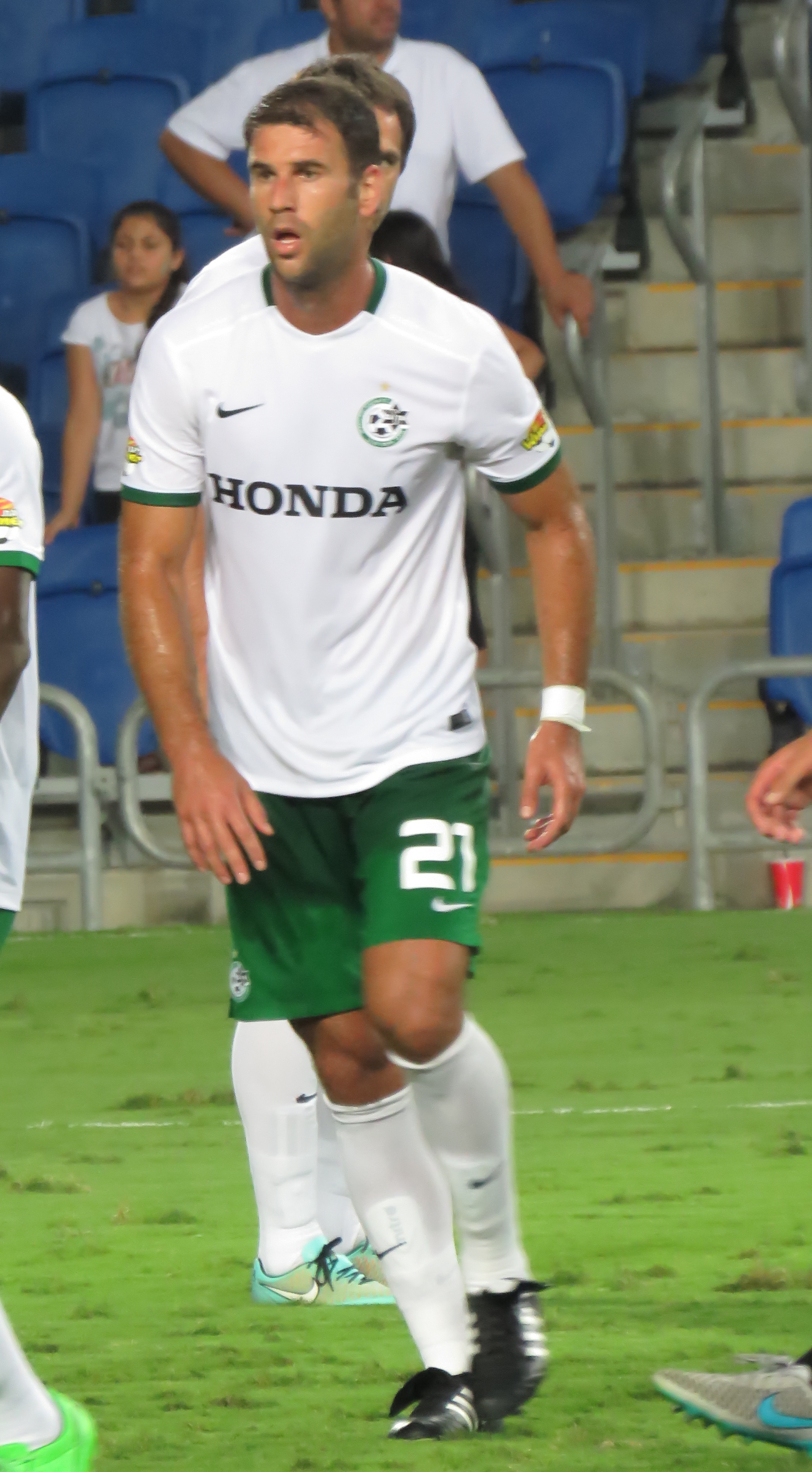
- Keinan playing for Maccabi Haifa in 2015

Personal information
- Full name: Dekel Keinan
- Date of birth: 15 September 1984 (age 42)
- Place of birth: Rosh HaNikra, Israel
- Height: 1.84 m (6 ft 0 in)
- Position: Defender

Team information
- Current team: Los Angeles Force
- Number: 21

Youth career
- Maccabi Haifa

Senior career*
Years	Team	Apps	(Gls)
2002–2010	Maccabi Haifa	136	(6)
2004–2005	→ Bnei Sakhnin (loan)	23	(3)
2005–2006	→ Maccabi Netanya (loan)	21	(2)
2010–2011	Blackpool	6	(0)
2011–2012	Cardiff City	19	(2)
2011–2012	→ Crystal Palace (loan)	3	(0)
2012	→ Bristol City (loan)	1	(0)
2012–2017	Maccabi Haifa	137	(15)
2018	FC Cincinnati	22	(2)
2019–2020	Sacramento Republic	28	(1)
2021–2022	Las Vegas Lights	32	(1)
2023–	Los Angeles Force	17	(2)

International career^{‡}
2001–2003	Israel U-19	11	(1)
2003–2007	Israel U-21	30	(0)
2007–2013	Israel	27	(0)

Managerial career
- 2024–: Los Angeles Force (player-manager)
- * Club domestic league appearances and goals as of 22 October 2022 ‡ National team caps and goals as of 10 August 2011

Dekel Keinan (Hebrew: דקל קינן; born 15 September 1984) is an Israeli association footballer who plays as a central defender and manager for the Los Angeles Force of the National Independent Soccer Association.

== Early life ==
Keinan was born in Rosh HaNikra, Israel, to a family of Ashkenazi Jewish descent.

== Club career ==
=== Maccabi Haifa ===
Keinan started his career with the Maccabi Haifa youth team. He made his first team debut in the 2002–03 season, making seven appearances. On 6 November 2003 he made his European debut in the second round of the 2003–04 UEFA Cup, a 0–0 draw with La Liga side Valencia.

In the 2004–05 season, he went on loan to fellow Israeli Premier League side Bnei Sakhnin, making 23 appearances and scoring five goals. The following season he joined Maccabi Netanya on loan, making 21 appearances and scoring two goals.

His first goal for Maccabi came in the 2007–08 Israeli Premier League season, a 3–0 win over Bnei Yehuda at the Bloomfield Stadium on 10 November 2007.

In the 2009–10 season he made eleven appearances in Maccabi's UEFA Champions League campaign as they reached the group stages.

=== Blackpool ===
On 12 July 2010, it was reported that Keinan had agreed a one-year contract with recently promoted Premier League club Blackpool, and that subject to a medical, he would join on a free transfer two days later. Blackpool chairman, Karl Oyston confirmed that the club had held discussions with Keinan and were hopeful of signing him, after a medical on 15 July. Five days later it was revealed that Keinan had passed the medical and that he was waiting on a work permit before he could link-up with the Blackpool squad in Devon where they were competing in the pre-season South West Challenge Cup tournament.

On 23 July, Blackpool manager Ian Holloway confirmed that Keinan was about to sign, after finally being granted a work permit, saying, "Dekel has got to fly to Tel Aviv to get his passport done. And he's got to do an English test, which he'll pass and I would fail. I think he's a quality lad and a good player. And I'm delighted to have someone with his experience. " Over three weeks later on 16 August, Sky Sports News reported that Keinan had finally joined Blackpool, claiming that he had signed a two-year contract. Two days later he finally joined the Tangerines, on a one-year contract with an option for a further 12 months. Speaking about the move, Keinan said: "I'm looking forward to the first game and I'm very happy that everything is done. I just want to play for Blackpool and help this team. I had different offers but after I met the gaffer I was sure that I wanted to play for Blackpool."

His debut came on 21 August in the 6–0 defeat to Arsenal at the Emirates Stadium. After defender Ian Evatt was sent off in the 32nd minute, Keinan was then brought on to replace sacrificed midfielder Ludovic Sylvestre.

He made his full debut in the second round of the 2010–11 League Cup, a 4–3 defeat to Milton Keynes Dons at Stadium MK.

=== Cardiff City ===
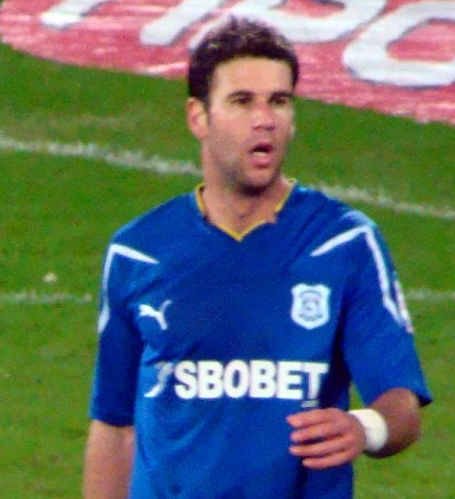
Keinan playing for Cardiff City in 2011

Keinan joined Cardiff City, for an undisclosed fee, in January 2011. Keinan made his debut for Cardiff in a 1–0 away win against local rivals Swansea City. His first goal in English football came in a 2–2 draw with Barnsley on 13 March. Cardiff City had reached the play-offs, Cardiff were drawn against Reading, the first leg was 0–0 draw at Madjeski Stadium. During the return leg, Keinan pulled on Matthew Mills' shirt in which referee Howard Webb gave a penalty, Shane Long scored his second of the match from the penalty and Cardiff ended losing the match 3–0.

At the start of the 2011–12 season, Keinan found himself not in the starting eleven, being replaced by Anthony Gerrard who returned from his loan spell at Hull City. He got his first call up to the team on 23 August against Huddersfield Town in the League Cup. Keinan didn't find himself on the bench until a start against Leicester City, on 21 September. Due to a mass of injuries, Keinan found his first league appearance under Malky Mackay against Southampton a week later. On 21 November 2011, Keinan joined Crystal Palace on a six-week loan after finding himself far down the pecking order.

Keinan returned to Cardiff on 7 January, and found himself straight in the starting line up for the following game against West Bromwich Albion in the FA Cup, which was his 250th career appearance. However a lack of opportunities continued, which saw Keinan sent out on loan again, but this time to Severnside rivals, Bristol City until the end of the season.

Following his disappointing first full season in Cardiff, Keinan was left out of the squad to travel to Switzerland during the pre-season tour. Despite being left out of the pre-season, Keinan started the first game of the season against Northampton Town.

=== Return to Maccabi Haifa ===
On 18 September 2012, Keinan signed for his former club Maccabi Haifa following his release from Cardiff City.

=== FC Cincinnati ===
On 10 November 2017, the club FC Cincinnati of the United Soccer League, a second-division soccer league in the United States, announced that they had signed Keinan for the 2018 season.

=== Sacramento Republic ===
On 22 December 2018, Keinan signed with Sacramento Republic FC of the USL Championship.

=== Las Vegas Lights ===
On 15 September 2021, Keinan signed with USL Championship side Las Vegas Lights.

=== Los Angeles Force ===
In May 2023, Keinan began playing for Los Angeles Force in the third division National Independent Soccer Association. In his first match on 15 May against Salt City Union, he scored a goal as a second-half substitute in the 3–1 win.

== Managerial career ==
On 9 December 2023, Keinan was named as the player-manager for Los Angeles Force in the third division National Independent Soccer Association.

== Club career statistics ==
As of 30 December 2017

			League		Cup		League Cup		Europe		Total	
Club	Season	League	Apps	Goals	Apps	Goals	Apps	Goals	Apps	Goals	Apps	Goals
Maccabi Haifa	2002–03	Israeli Premier League	7	0	2	0	0	0	0	0	9	0
Maccabi Haifa	2003–04	Israeli Premier League	13	0	0	0	6	0	2	0	21	0
Maccabi Haifa	2004–05	Israeli Premier League	1	0	0	0	6	0	2	0	7	0
Maccabi Haifa	2005–06	Israeli Premier League	1	0	0	0	6	1	0	0	7	1
Maccabi Haifa	2006–07	Israeli Premier League	28	0	3	0	3	0	12	0	46	0
Maccabi Haifa	2007–08	Israeli Premier League	24	2	0	0	7	0	–		31	2
Maccabi Haifa	2008–09	Israeli Premier League	28	3	5	0	4	1	–		28	3
Maccabi Haifa	2009–10	Israeli Premier League	34	1	2	0	7	0	11	0	54	1
Maccabi Haifa	Total		136	6	12	0	39	2	27	0	214	8
Bnei Sakhnin (loan)	2004–05	Israeli Premier League	23	3	2	0	–				23	3
Maccabi Netanya (loan)	2005–06	Israeli Premier League	21	2	–		–		–		21	2
Blackpool	2010–11	Premier League	6	0	1	0	1	0	–		8	0
Cardiff City	2010–11	Championship	20	2	0	0	0	0	–		20	2
Cardiff City	2011–12	Championship	1	0	1	0	2	0	–		4	0
Cardiff City	2012–13	Championship	0	0	0	0	1	0	–		1	0
Cardiff City	Total		21	2	1	0	3	0	–	–	25	2
Crystal Palace (loan)	2011–12	Championship	3	0	0	0	0	0	–		3	0
Bristol City (loan)	2011–12	Championship	1	0	0	0	0	0	–		1	0
Maccabi Haifa	2012–13	Israeli Premier League	30	5	3	0	2	0	0	0	35	5
Maccabi Haifa	2013–14	Israeli Premier League	24	0	1	0	0	0	5	0	30	0
Maccabi Haifa	2014–15	Israeli Premier League	14	1	1	0	8	0	–		23	1
Maccabi Haifa	2015–16	Israeli Premier League	31	5	5	0	6	0	–		42	5
Maccabi Haifa	2016–17	Israeli Premier League	30	4	2 (Note: One appearance in Israeli Super Cup)	0	4	0	1	0	37	4
Maccabi Haifa	2017–18	Israeli Premier League	8	0	0	0	6	1	–		14	1
Maccabi Haifa	Total		137	15	12	0	26	1	6	0	181	16
Career total			348	28	30	0	69	3	33	0	469	31

Notes

a. All cup appearances for Maccabi Haifa included in 2009–10 total as specific season details not yet known
b. All European appearances for Maccabi Haifa details not known, therefore known total included only in totals

== International career ==
Keinan, a full international for Israel, has also played at under-19 and under-21 levels.

He made his under-19 debut, two months after his 17th birthday, in a 2002 UEFA European Under-19 Football Championship qualifier on 30 November 2001, a 0–0 draw with Yugoslavia at the Herzliya Municipal Stadium. On 3 October 2002 he scored as Israel beat Azerbaijan 4–0 in a 2003 UEFA European Under-19 Football Championship qualifier. He made a total of eleven appearances at under-19 level, scoring one goal.

Keinan made his under-21 debut on 30 April 2003 in a 3–0 2004 UEFA European Under-21 Football Championship qualififier defeat to Cyprus. In June 2007 he was part of the Israel squad for the 2007 UEFA European Under-21 Football Championship finals, held in the Netherlands, playing in all three groups games.

He was the captain of the national team at the 2006 victory for her Valeri Lobanovsky Memorial Tournament.

He made his Israeli senior national team debut on 2 June 2007, in a 2–1 win over Macedonia, a UEFA Euro 2008 qualifying Group E game at the Skopje City Stadium. In 2008 and 2009 he made six appearances in qualifying for the 2010 FIFA World Cup.

== Managerial statistics ==
As of 9 December 2023

Managerial record by team and tenure
Team	Nat	From	To	Record				
Team	Nat	From	To	G	W	D	L	Win %
Los Angeles Force	(United States)	9 December 2023		0	0	0	0	—
Career totals				0	0	0	0	—

== Honours ==
=== Club ===
Maccabi Haifa

- Israeli Premier League: 2003–04, 2008–09
- Toto Cup: 2007–08
- Israel State Cup: 2015–16

== Notes ==
Sporting positions
Preceded by Yossi Benayoun	Maccabi Haifa F.C. captain 2016–2018	Succeeded by Rami Gershon
