= Mahmmoud Kanadil =

Israeli association footballer

Mahmmoud Qandil
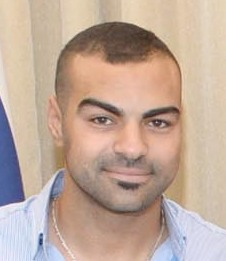
- Kanadil in 2015

Personal information
- Full name: Mahmmoud Qandil
- Date of birth: 11 August 1988 (age 38)
- Place of birth: Jadeidi-Makr, Israel
- Height: 1.82 m (5 ft 11 1/2 in)
- Position: Goalkeeper

Team information
- Current team: Bnei Sakhnin
- Number: 22

Youth career
- 2002–2005: Hapoel Makr
- 2005–2006: Hapoel Abu Snan
- 2006–2007: Bnei Sakhnin

Senior career*
Years	Team	Apps	(Gls)
2007–2023	Bnei Sakhnin	322	(0)
- * Club domestic league appearances and goals as of 1 June 2022

Mahmmoud Qandil (Arabic: محمود قنديل, Hebrew: מחמוד קנדיל; born 11 August 1988) is an Israeli professional footballer playing for Bnei Sakhnin in the Israeli Premier League.

== Early life ==
Kanadil was born in Jadeidi-Makr, Israel, to a Muslim-Arab family.
