= Tomer Haran =

Israel footballer (born 1998)

Personal information
- Date of birth: 26 October 1998 (age 28)
- Place of birth: Israel
- Height: 1.97 m (6 ft 6 in)
- Position: Goalkeeper

Team information
- Current team: F.C. Jerusalem

Senior career*
Years	Team	Apps	(Gls)
2017–2022	Bnei Sakhnin	2	(0)
2021–2022	→ Hapoel Afula (loan)	5	(0)
2022	Rudar Velenje	3	(0)
2023	SV Babelsberg 03	1	(0)
2023–2024	Cerro Largo	12	(0)
2024–2025	Hapoel Migdal HaEmek	21	(0)
2025–	F.C. Jerusalem	14	(0)
- * Club domestic league appearances and goals as of 29 October 2025

Tomer Haran (Hebrew: תומר הרן; born 26 October 1998) is an Israeli professional footballer who plays as a goalkeeper for F.C. Jerusalem.

== Early life ==
Haran was born in 1998 in Israel. He is ethnically Jewish.

== Career ==
Haran started his career with Israeli side Bnei Sakhnin. In 2021, he was sent on loan to Israeli side Hapoel Afula. In 2022, he signed for Slovenian side Rudar. In 2023, he signed for German side SV Babelsberg 03. After that, he signed for Uruguayan side Cerro Largo. He became the second Israeli footballer to sign for a Uruguayan club. On 7 October 2023, he debuted for the club during a 1–0 win over Fénix.

== Personal life ==
Haran grew up in Degania Alef, Israel. He obtained a Portuguese passport.
