= Sayef Fedoul =

Israeli footballer

Sayef Fedoul فيديل سيف
Personal information
- Full name: Sayef Fedoul
- Date of birth: January 7, 1996 (age 30)
- Place of birth: I'billin, Israel
- Positions: Center back; defensive midfielder

Youth career
- 2007–2008: Maccabi Haifa
- 2008–2010: Hapoel Haifa
- 2010–2016: Maccabi Netanya

Senior career*
Years	Team	Apps	(Gls)
2015–2020	Maccabi Netanya	38	(0)
2019–2020	Hapoel Bnei Tuba Zangariyye	12	(2)
2020–2022	Hapoel Tarshiha	6	(1)
- * Club domestic league appearances and goals

Sayef Fedoul (Arabic: فيديل سيف, Hebrew: סייף פדול; born January 7, 1996) is an Israeli footballer.

Fedoul made his debut for Maccabi Netanya on December 26, 2015, in a league game against Hapoel Tel Aviv.

== Honours ==
- Liga Leumit
  - Winner (1): 2016–17
