= Maurício Cordeiro =

Brazilian footballer (born 1992)

Personal information
- Full name: Maurício Plenckauskas Cordeiro
- Date of birth: 31 December 1992 (age 33)
- Place of birth: Brazil height = 1.89 m (6 ft 2 in)
- Position: Forward

Team information
- Current team: Hồ Chí Minh City
- Number: 91

Youth career
- 2009–2012: Avaí FC

Senior career*
Years	Team	Apps	(Gls)
2012	Grêmio Barueri Futebol	1	(0)
2012–2013	Avaí FC	6	(0)
2013	Oeste Futebol Clube		
2013–2014	Mirassol Futebol Clube	6	(0)
2014	Red Bull Brasil		
2015	Clube Atlético Penapolense		
2016–2017	Ironi Kiryat Shmona	26	(2)
2016	→ F.C. Ashdod	14	(7)
2017–2018	F.C. Ashdod	29	(6)
2018–2019	Esporte Clube Vitória	4	(1)
2019–2020	Nea Salamis Famagusta	10	(0)
2020–2021	Hapoel Afula	12	(1)
2021–2021	Hapoel Jerusalem	10	(1)
2022–	Hồ Chí Minh City	2	(0)
- * Club domestic league appearances and goals

Maurício Plenckauskas Cordeiro (born 31 December 1992 in Brazil) is a Brazilian footballer who now plays for Hồ Chí Minh City in Vietnam.

== Career ==
Cordeiro started his senior career with Grêmio Barueri Futebol. In 2016, he signed for Hapoel Ironi Kiryat Shmona in the Israeli Premier League, where he made thirty-eight appearances and scored seven goals. After that, he played for Ashdod, Esporte Clube Vitória, and Nea Salamis Famagusta.

On 10 August 2020 signed in Hapoel Afula.
