= Yossi Benayoun =

Israeli footballer (born 1980)

Yossi Benayoun יוסי שי בניון
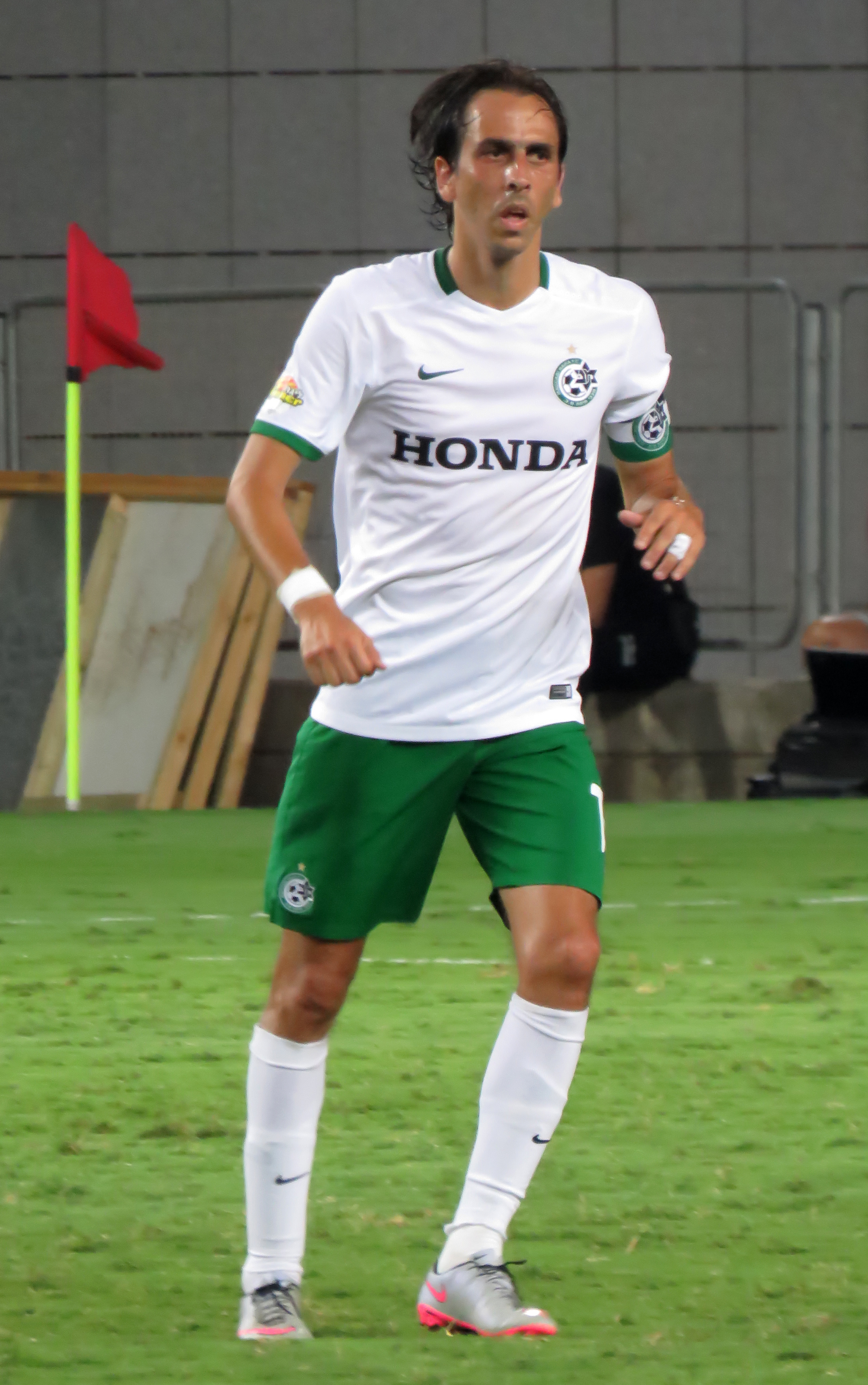
- Benayoun playing for Maccabi Haifa in 2015

Personal information
- Full name: Yossi Shai Benayoun
- Date of birth: 5 May 1980 (age 46)
- Place of birth: Dimona, Israel
- Height: 1.73 m (5 ft 8 in)
- Position: Midfielder

Youth career
- 1989–1992: Hapoel Dimona
- 1992–1995: Hapoel Be'er Sheva
- 1995–1996: Ajax
- 1996–1997: Hapoel Be'er Sheva

Senior career*
Years	Team	Apps	(Gls)
1997–1998	Hapoel Be'er Sheva	25	(15)
1998–2002	Maccabi Haifa	130	(55)
2002–2005	Racing Santander	101	(20)
2005–2007	West Ham United	63	(8)
2007–2010	Liverpool	92	(18)
2010–2013	Chelsea	14	(1)
2011–2012	→ Arsenal (loan)	19	(4)
2012	→ West Ham United (loan)	6	(0)
2013–2014	Queens Park Rangers	16	(3)
2014–2016	Maccabi Haifa	55	(11)
2016–2017	Maccabi Tel Aviv	27	(1)
2017–2018	Beitar Jerusalem	14	(3)
2018–2019	Maccabi Petah Tikva	22	(7)
2019	Beitar Jerusalem	15	(0)
Total		599	(146)

International career
1995	Israel U16	30	(6)
1996–1997	Israel U18	8	(12)
1998–2001	Israel U21	11	(5)
1998–2017	Israel	101	(23)
- * Club domestic league appearances and goals

Yossi Shai Benayoun (Hebrew: יוסי שי בניון; born 5 May 1980) is an Israeli former professional footballer who played as a midfielder. He spent most of his career in Israel and England and captained the Israel national team. Born in Dimona, he is sometimes nicknamed "The Diamond from Dimona" in Israel. As of 2023, he has been the sporting director of the Israel national team.

Benayoun played for Hapoel Be'er Sheva and Maccabi Haifa before moving to Racing Santander in Spain. Three years later he moved to the Premier League with West Ham United, and later Liverpool. In 2010, he signed for Chelsea, where he was used rarely, being loaned to Arsenal and back to West Ham, but nonetheless won the 2012–13 UEFA Europa League. After that, he was released by the club and spent a season in the Football League Championship with Queens Park Rangers before returning to Maccabi Haifa.

A full international for twenty years from 1998 to 2018, Benayoun is Israel's most capped player of all time with 101 appearances, and their joint-third top scorer with 23 international goals.

Benayoun holds the position of sporting director for Beitar Jerusalem, the club that he last played for.

== Early life ==
Benayoun was born in Dimona, Israel, to a family of Sephardic Moroccan Jewish descent. His father Dudu Benayoun was a footballer who played for Hapoel Dimona as well.

=== Youth career ===
Jason Burt of The Independent reports that Benayoun's talent was spotted at the age of nine. At the age of 11 he was labelled a genius, and by 13, his face appeared on the cover of Israeli magazines. Benayoun began to play with Hapoel Be'er Sheva. To attend training, he hitchhiked the 60 km roundtrip with his father.

When he was 15, Ajax invited Benayoun and his family to the Netherlands. By his 16th birthday, he was the Ajax youth team's highest scorer and best player, and Ajax duly offered Benayoun a four-year professional contract. However, Benayoun and his family found the adjustment to Amsterdam difficult, and they returned to Israel after eight months.

== Club career ==
=== Hapoel Be'er Sheva ===
At the age of 16, he was promoted to the Hapoel Be'er Sheva senior team for the 1997–98 Liga Leumit, but could not prevent the club from being relegated to Israel's second division. In the last match of the season against Maccabi Haifa, Benayoun got a penalty kick in the 90th minute. Haifa's goalkeeper, Nir Davidovich, saved the shot but Benayoun scored the rebound to give his team the win. However, their relegation rival had won their match, meaning that his team would be relegated nonetheless. Seconds after scoring, while celebrating the winning and what he thought to be a league survival goal, Benayoun found out about the relegation and burst into tears. Benayoun finished as the league's joint fourth-leading goalscorer that season, with 15 goals in 25 appearances.

=== Maccabi Haifa ===
After that season, Benayoun moved to Maccabi Haifa in a deal signed by Ya'akov Shahar (Maccabi Haifa's president) and Eli Zino (the former Be'er Sheva president), and it was agreed that the two clubs would share the profits from selling Benayoun to a European club.

In 1998, under the guidance of Dusan Uhrin and Daniel Brailovsky, Benayoun and Haifa reached the quarterfinals of the Cup Winners' Cup, and he scored a late equaliser against Paris Saint-Germain and also against SV Ried in a 4–1 victory.

Benayoun also scored 16 goals in 29 matches for Haifa in the 1998–99 Liga Leumit, finishing the season as the equal eighth leading goalscorer for his team.

In 1999, he confronted his manager Eli Cohen, when Benayoun allegedly refused to be substituted during a match. This incident, plus a bad month for the club, ultimately caused Cohen's resignation. In the 1999–2000, the maiden season of the newly formed Israeli Premier League, Benayoun scored 19 goals in 38 matches for Maccabi Haifa, and was the league's third highest goalscorer.

In the 2000–01 season under the guidance of Avram Grant, Benayoun led Haifa to a first championship after seven years and was chosen as the Most Valuable Player of the season, after amassing 13 goals in 37 matches. Another successful season placed him as the league's equal sixth highest goalscorer.

The next season, Benayoun helped Maccabi Haifa win another championship, despite suffering from an injury at the beginning of the season. When he returned to play, he combined well with Đovani Roso, Raimondas Žutautas, and Yakubu to win the championship. In his last season with Maccabi Haifa, Benayoun scored 7 times in 33 matches.

Benayoun made 130 appearances for Haifa, scoring 55 goals.

=== Racing de Santander ===
In 2002, Benayoun moved to Racing de Santander in Spain's La Liga, scoring five goals in 31 matches his first season (2002–03 La Liga), seven goals in 35 matches his second (2003–04 La Liga), and nine goals in 35 matches his third (2004–05 La Liga), the latter including a hat-trick against Deportivo La Coruña in a 4–1 away victory.

In total, he made 101 appearances for Racing, scoring 21 goals.

Santander opted to cash in on Benayoun by selling him to his agents Pini Zahavi and Ronen Katsav for €3.5 million. Benayoun rejected a €5 million move to CSKA Moscow, preferring a move to England or to remain in Spain. This sparked a great deal of interest in the player with Newcastle United, Tottenham Hotspur, Liverpool, Bolton Wanderers, Real Sociedad, and Deportivo La Coruña seen as likely suitors.

=== West Ham United ===
Newly promoted FA Premier League team West Ham United completed the signing of Benayoun in July 2005 for a fee of £2.5 million, with Benayoun signing a four-year contract. Manager Alan Pardew hailed the signing citing Benayoun's ability to 'open the door when teams sit deep' while Benayoun revealed his excitement at the opportunity to play for West Ham and in the Premiership.

He made his Premiership debut for West Ham on the opening day of the 2005–06 season (13 August 2005 against Blackburn Rovers) in West Ham's 3–1 win. He went on to score his first Premiership goal for the club when he netted the closing goal in a 4–0 home victory over Aston Villa on 12 September 2005.

In May 2006, Benayoun played in the 2006 FA Cup Final for West Ham against Liverpool in Cardiff, West Ham losing on penalties after a 3–3 draw. Benayoun scored five times in 34 league matches in his first season at West Ham and three goals in 29 appearances his second season. His last game for West Ham was a 1–0 victory against Manchester United at Old Trafford on 13 May 2007, a game in which West Ham avoided relegation following a single goal from Carlos Tevez.

=== Liverpool ===
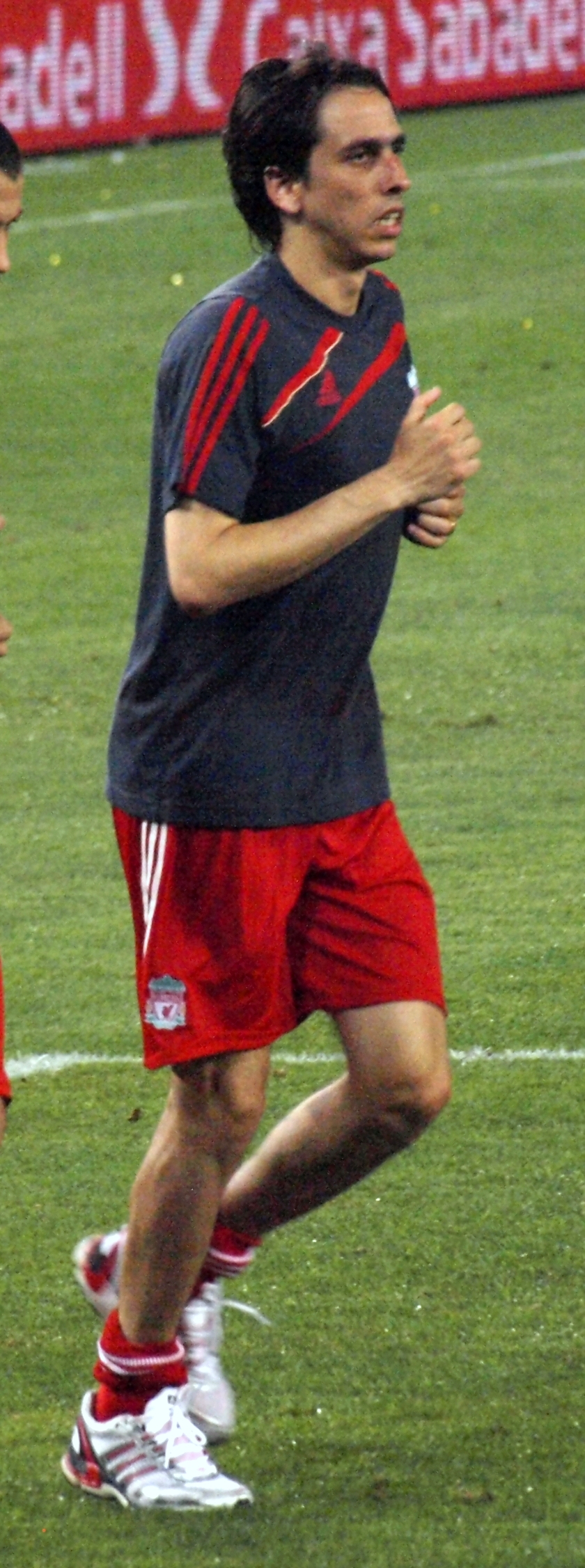
Benayoun warming up for Liverpool in 2009

Benayoun moved to Liverpool under controversial circumstances. He had verbally agreed on a new four-year deal with West Ham in May 2007, only to go back on the agreement in a bid to move to Liverpool. The controversy was heightened on 10 July when the Israeli media reported that Benayoun's agent, Ronen Katsav, had agreed a deal with Liverpool which would mean Benayoun taking a lower pay than the £50,000 a week offered by West Ham in May. On 12 July, Liverpool reported on their official website that the signing of Benayoun had been completed a £5 million deal with him signing a four-year contract.

Benayoun was introduced as a Liverpool player along with Ryan Babel on 13 July, and was given the number 11 shirt. He made his first competitive start for Liverpool against Toulouse in the first leg of the third qualification round for the UEFA Champions League. His first goal for Liverpool came on 25 September 2007 when he scored against Reading in the League Cup. On 7 November 2007, in a UEFA Champions League home game against Beşiktaş in the Group Stage, Benayoun scored a hat trick in Liverpool's 8–0 win against the Istanbul team. Benayoun scored a second hat-trick against a mismatched opponent in his first season against non-league side Havant & Waterlooville in the FA Cup, a team 122 places behind Liverpool on the league pyramid. Benayoun ended a successful first season having played 48 games scoring 11 goals in the process, including four league goals against Wigan Athletic, Portsmouth, Aston Villa, and Birmingham City.

Benayoun's performance was not enough to prevent transfer rumours in the summer of 2008. This led to the Israeli openly announcing his intention to stay, saying: "Liverpool is good for me and it was always clear I want to stay and Liverpool wants me," He was given his preferred number 15 shirt (which was occupied by Peter Crouch during the 2007–08 season but was vacated when he moved to Portsmouth) the reason he switched from 11 to 15 was because it was the number he wore for Hapoel Be'er Sheva, Maccabi Haifa, Racing de Santander, West Ham United and Israel.

On 6 December 2008, Benayoun scored his first goal of the 2008–09 season in Liverpool's 3–1 victory over Blackburn.

On 25 February 2009, Benayoun scored a header from Fábio Aurélio's free-kick in the 82nd minute against Real Madrid at the Santiago Bernabéu in the UEFA Champions League Round of 16 to give Liverpool a 1–0 win.

Again on 4 April 2009, Benayoun came on as a substitute in Liverpool's match against Fulham to score a dramatic winner in the 94th minute. On 21 April 2009, in a home match against Arsenal, he scored a diving header and volleyed a late equaliser in injury time to level the scores at 4–4.

Benayoun finished his second season at Anfield in spectacular fashion; scoring a goal in each of Liverpool's last three home matches. In the 2008–09 season, Benayoun played in 39 matches, scoring 9 goals, including eight league goals against Wigan, Blackburn, Newcastle, Sunderland, Fulham, Tottenham Hotspur and a brace against Arsenal. He established a regular starting position in the Liverpool team in the second half of the season.

On 6 July 2009, he signed a two-year contract extension tying him to the club until 2013.

On 12 September 2009, he scored his first Premier League hat-trick for Liverpool in a 4–0 win against Burnley. He was the first player to score Premiership, Champions League and FA Cup hat tricks, but has since been joined by Sergio Agüero, Harry Kane and Erling Haaland . He scored the first goal in Liverpool's 3–0 win over West Ham.

Benayoun's last goal for the club came in the 2009–10 UEFA Europa League semi-final against Atlético Madrid. Benayoun scored in extra time to give Liverpool a 2–1 aggregate lead before Diego Forlán scored to put Atleti through to the finals.

=== Chelsea ===
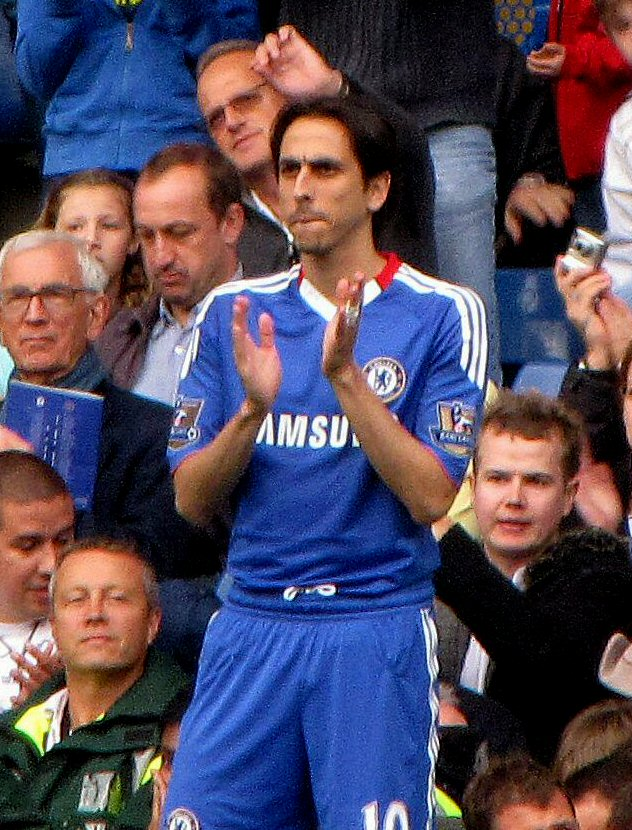
Benayoun playing for Chelsea in 2010

Benayoun signed for Chelsea on 2 July 2010, agreeing on a three-year deal, and keeping him at Stamford Bridge until summer 2013. Both clubs agreed on a fee of reported £5.5 million for the transfer of the Israeli winger's services. He said, in a statement to the club's official website, "I am very excited to come to a club like Chelsea, it is a big club and I think it is a dream for every player. Hopefully we will be successful."

Benayoun made his debut against Eintracht Frankfurt in a pre-season friendly before making his first competitive appearance on 8 August in a 3–1 loss against Manchester United in the 2010 FA Community Shield, by coming on for left-winger Florent Malouda in the 72nd minute. On 21 August, Benayoun scored his first league goal in the 93rd minute for Chelsea in a 6–0 thrashing of Wigan Athletic at the DW Stadium in Wigan, Greater Manchester. On 22 September, Benayoun ruptured his achilles during Chelsea's 4–3 League Cup loss against Newcastle United. Benayoun fully recovered from this injury and was played in the second half against Wigan Athletic on 9 April 2011.

On 26 August 2011, Benayoun offered Juan Mata his number 10 shirt. Benayoun said: "I decided to give Mata the number 10 – his favourite. For me it's just a number, not my lucky 15." (Florent Malouda wore number 15 at the time.) Mata wore the shirt for Valencia and while skippering Spain's Under 21s in the summer and expressed his gratitude to Benayoun. "It is a very important number to me so I'm pleased to be wearing it. I want to thank Yossi," he said.

During the 2011 Tour of Asia, in the friendly game against the Malaysia XI team, Benayoun suffered repeated booing from the Malaysian crowd each time he touched the ball. It was reported that "The occasion was soured by the repeated jeering of Israel midfielder Benayoun by the 85,000-strong crowd ..." another source reported that "Muslim-majority Malaysia is a staunch supporter of the Palestinians and has no diplomatic ties with Israel. The midfielder was jeered throughout his appearance for the first half of the friendly."

==== Arsenal (loan) ====
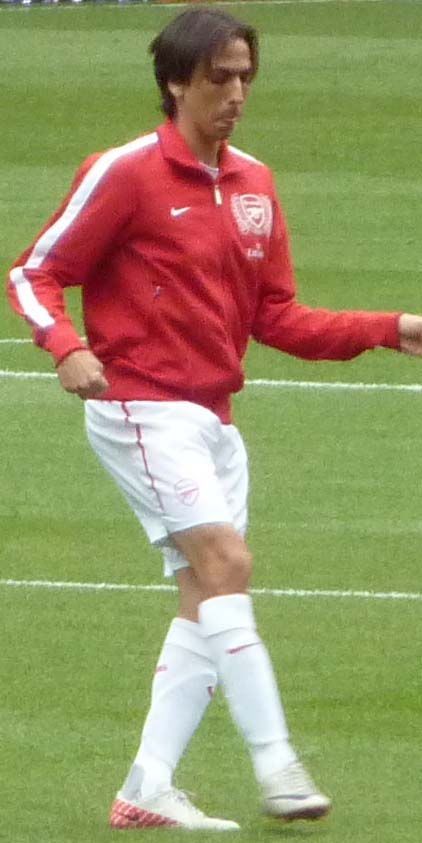
Benayoun warming up for Arsenal in 2011

On 31 August 2011, it was confirmed Benayoun had joined Arsenal on a one-year loan deal as he found chances at Chelsea limited. He made his debut on 10 September 2011 coming on as a second-half substitute for Andrei Arshavin against Swansea City. On 20 September 2011, he scored his first goal for Arsenal in the 78th minute of a League Cup match against Shrewsbury Town.

Benayoun scored his first UEFA Champions League goal for Arsenal in a 3–1 defeat to Olympiacos. He scored his first Premier League goal for Arsenal against Aston Villa, scoring an 87th-minute header in a 2–1 victory on 21 December 2011.

Benayoun captained Arsenal in their 1–0 League Cup defeat to Manchester City. He stated "The truth is I did not expect this, but it was a nice moment. When the line-up was revealed at the hotel, I saw the letter 'C' next to my name; I thought there was some mix up. But overall it was a nice experience"

Benayoun started the match against Tottenham Hotspur on 26 February 2012. He came off in the 88th minute for Gervinho, receiving a standing ovation from the Arsenal faithful with the Gunners winning the match 5–2, after being 2–0 down. He then started against his old club Liverpool, on 3 March 2012, before being substituted in the 74th minute again for Gervinho, Arsenal went on to win the game 2–1. He then started the match against Manchester City on 8 April 2012, and nearly had a chance to score in the second half, but only to see his stabbing shot take a deflection, which then came off the post. He was substituted in the second half for Aaron Ramsey, and just like in the match against Tottenham, the Arsenal fans gave him a standing ovation when leaving the pitch. Arsenal went on to win the game 1–0, thanks to a late Mikel Arteta goal. On 11 April 2012 he scored his second league goal of the season in the 3–0 away win against Wolves, a result which strengthened Arsenal's place in third as they opened up a gap of five points over arch-rival Tottenham Hotspur and Newcastle United with five games remaining. He then opened the scoring against Norwich in Arsenal's final home game of the season which ended 3–3 and then scoring in the last game of the season for Arsenal against West Bromwich Albion at the Hawthorns, the match ended 3–2 to Arsenal, meaning Arsenal would finish third, beating their North London rivals Tottenham Hotspur, who finished fourth. In all, Benayoun played 19 league games for Arsenal, scoring four goals.

==== West Ham United (loan) ====
On 31 August 2012, Benayoun returned to West Ham United on loan for the 2012–13 season, becoming their eleventh signing of the transfer window. He sustained an injury playing against Newcastle United in November and pulled a ligament after returning to training. He played no further games for West Ham and returned to Chelsea in December 2012. He had played only six games on loan with West Ham.

=== Queens Park Rangers ===
Benayoun joined Queens Park Rangers until the end of the 2013–14 season on 10 December 2013. He made his debut against Leicester City in a 1–0 loss in a league match coming as a 69th-minute substitute for Tom Carroll. He scored his first goal for the club on 22 March 2014 in an away trip to Middlesbrough to equalise in a game which QPR went on to win 1–3. He scored his second goal for the club three days later in a 1–0 home win over Wigan Athletic, though he was also sent off towards the very end of the game for a second bookable offence.

=== Maccabi Haifa ===
On 6 June 2014, it was officially announced that Benayoun would return to Maccabi Haifa on a two-year deal worth US$1 million. He was appointed the team's captain, replacing veteran Yaniv Katan who retired from football. In his two seasons, Maccabi Haifa did not do well in the Israeli Premier League, with Benayoun scoring five and six goals respectively, but did win the Israel State Cup after 18 years. Benayoun had some confrontations with the fans, and after he and Haifa won the cup, he announced he was leaving Haifa and joining bitter rivals Maccabi Tel Aviv.

=== Maccabi Tel Aviv ===
Benayoun played one season in Maccabi Tel Aviv, scoring only one league goal and failing to win any title.

=== Beitar Jerusalem ===
In the beginning of the 2017–18 season Benayoun signed for Beitar Jerusalem. He started well, scoring three league goals with Beitar ranking among the league's leaders, before losing his place in the first squad in January and playing very little. As a result, he left Beitar and signed for Maccabi Petah Tikva. After a short spell with Maccabi Petah Tikva, he returned to Beitar Jerusalem in 2019.

=== Retirement ===
In April 2019, Benayoun announced his retirement from football.

== International career ==
Benayoun was a member of the Israel U16 team that came third in the 1996 UEFA European Under-16 Championship.

He made his senior debut for the Israel national team against Portugal in a friendly on 18 November 1998 that resulted in a 2–0 away loss. Benayoun scored his first international hat-trick in a UEFA Euro 2000 qualifier against San Marino at Ramat Gan Stadium on 8 September 1999. The match finished as an 8–0 win for Israel.

During the 2006 FIFA World Cup qualifiers, Benayoun became the leading player of the Israel national team after equalizing against Cyprus at home (in a game that ended 2–1 to Israel) and scoring twice against Switzerland. In the away game in Cyprus, He assisted the winning goal after Nir Davidovich saved a crucial goal. His strong performances gave Israel a chance at qualifying for the World Cup, but in the end it wasn't enough to qualify for the playoffs as Switzerland beat them on goal difference

Just prior to the UEFA Euro 2008 qualifiers, Benayoun was given the captaincy of the Israeli national team. In eight appearances in the qualifiers, Benayoun has scored two goals. On 2 September 2010, Benayoun scored his second international hat-trick against Malta in a 3–1 win. Benayoun is Israel's most capped player of all time with 102 caps, and their joint third top scorer with 24 international goals.

In 2026, he participated in the World Maccabi Games (Maccabiah), the Jewish Olympics, as part of the +35 Israeli football team. The Israeli team was defeated the +35 Brazilian team, with Benayoun being sent off with a red card after attacking a Brazilian player.

== Career statistics ==
=== Club ===
Appearances and goals by club, season and competition
Club	Season	League			National cup		League cup		Continental		Other		Total	
Club	Season	Division	Apps	Goals	Apps	Goals	Apps	Goals	Apps	Goals	Apps	Goals	Apps	Goals
Hapoel Be'er Sheva	1997–98	Liga Leumit	25	15	0	0	0	0	0	0	–		25	15
Maccabi Haifa	1998–99	Liga Leumit	29	16	3	2	3	2	7	2	–		42	22
Maccabi Haifa	1999–2000	Israeli Premier League	36	19	4	3	5	2	0	0	–		45	24
Maccabi Haifa	2000–01	Israeli Premier League	37	13	3	2	2	0	4	0	–		46	15
Maccabi Haifa	2001–02	Israeli Premier League	28	7	4	1	2	1	0	0	–		34	9
Maccabi Haifa	Total		130	55	14	8	12	5	11	2	0	0	167	70
Racing Santander	2002–03	La Liga	31	4	0	0	–		–		–		31	4
Racing Santander	2003–04	La Liga	35	7	2	0	–		1	0	–		38	7
Racing Santander	2004–05	La Liga	35	9	0	0	–		0	0	–		35	9
Racing Santander	Total		101	20	2	0	0	0	1	0	0	0	104	20
West Ham United	2005–06	Premier League	34	5	6	0	0	0	–		–		40	5
West Ham United	2006–07	Premier League	29	3	1	0	0	0	2	0	–		32	3
West Ham United	Total		63	8	7	0	0	0	2	0	0	0	72	8
Liverpool	2007–08	Premier League	30	4	3	3	3	1	11	3	–		47	11
Liverpool	2008–09	Premier League	32	8	1	0	0	0	9	1	–		42	9
Liverpool	2009–10	Premier League	30	6	2	0	1	0	12	3	–		45	9
Liverpool	Total		92	18	6	3	4	1	32	7	0	0	134	29
Chelsea	2010–11	Premier League	7	1	0	0	1	0	1	0	1 (Note: Appearance in FA Community Shield)	0	10	1
Chelsea	2011–12	Premier League	1	0	0	0	0	0	0	0	0	0	1	0
Chelsea	2012–13	Premier League	6	0	2	0	0	0	5	0	0	0	13	0
Chelsea	Total		14	1	2	0	1	0	6	0	1	0	24	1
Arsenal (loan)	2011–12	Premier League	19	4	0	0	3	1	3	1	0	0	25	6
West Ham United (loan)	2012–13	Premier League	6	0	–		–		–		–		6	0
Queens Park Rangers	2013–14	Championship	16	3	1	0	0	0	–		–		17	3
Maccabi Haifa	2014–15	Israeli Premier League	26	5	4	0	1	0	0	0	–		31	5
Maccabi Haifa	2015–16	Israeli Premier League	29	6	5	1	5	2	0	0	–		39	9
Maccabi Haifa	Total		55	11	9	1	6	2	0	0	0	0	70	14
Maccabi Tel Aviv	2016–17	Israeli Premier League	27	1	4	1	5	1	11	2	–		47	5
Beitar Jerusalem	2017–18	Israeli Premier League	14	3	0	0	3	1	4	1	–		21	5
Maccabi Petah Tikva	2017–18	Israeli Premier League	10	4	0	0	0	0	0	0	–		10	4
Maccabi Petah Tikva	2018–19	Israeli Premier League	12	3	0	0	0	0	0	0	–		12	3
Maccabi Petah Tikva	Total		22	7	0	0	0	0	0	0	0	0	22	7
Beitar Jerusalem	2018–19	Israeli Premier League	15	0	0	0	0	0	0	0	–		15	0
Career total			599	146	45	13	34	11	70	13	1	0	749	183

=== International ===
Appearances and goals by national team and year
National team	Year	Apps	Goals
Israel	1998	2	0
Israel	1999	5	4
Israel	2000	5	1
Israel	2001	7	0
Israel	2002	5	1
Israel	2003	9	0
Israel	2004	8	3
Israel	2005	7	2
Israel	2006	6	3
Israel	2007	7	0
Israel	2008	8	4
Israel	2009	8	1
Israel	2010	2	3
Israel	2011	5	1
Israel	2012	5	0
Israel	2013	4	0
Israel	2014	2	0
Israel	2015	0	0
Israel	2016	1	0
Israel	2017	5	0
Total		101	23

Scores and results list Israel's goal tally first, score column indicates score after each Benayoun goal.

List of international goals scored by Yossi Benayoun
No.	Date	Venue	Opponent	Score	Result	Competition
1	5 September 1999	Tsirion Stadium, Limassol, Cyprus	Cyprus	2–2	2–3	UEFA Euro 2000 qualifying
2	8 September 1999	Ramat Gan Stadium, Ramat Gan, Israel	San Marino	1–0	8–0	UEFA Euro 2000 qualifying
3	8 September 1999	Ramat Gan Stadium, Ramat Gan, Israel	San Marino	4–0	8–0	UEFA Euro 2000 qualifying
4	8 September 1999	Ramat Gan Stadium, Ramat Gan, Israel	San Marino	6–0	8–0	UEFA Euro 2000 qualifying
5	15 November 2000	Estadio Primeiro de Maio, Braga, Portugal	Portugal	1–2	1–2	Friendly
6	5 September 2002	Stade Josy Barthel, Luxembourg City, Luxembourg	Luxembourg	5–0	5–0	Friendly
7	8 September 2004	Ramat Gan Stadium, Ramat Gan, Israel	Cyprus	1–1	2–1	2006 FIFA World Cup qualification
8	9 October 2004	Ramat Gan Stadium, Ramat Gan, Israel	Switzerland	1–0	2–2	2006 FIFA World Cup qualification
9	9 October 2004	Ramat Gan Stadium, Ramat Gan, Israel	Switzerland	2–2	2–2	2006 FIFA World Cup qualification
10	9 February 2005	Teddy Kollek Stadium, Jerusalem, Israel	Croatia	2–2	3–3	Friendly
11	8 October 2005	Ramat Gan Stadium, Ramat Gan, Israel	Faroe Islands	1–0	2–1	2006 FIFA World Cup qualification
12	15 August 2006	Arena Petrol, Celje, Slovenia	Slovenia	1–0	1–1	Friendly
13	6 September 2006	Stadion de Goffert, Nijmegen, Netherlands	Andorra	1–0	4–1	UEFA Euro 2008 qualifying
14	15 November 2006	Ramat Gan Stadium, Ramat Gan, Israel	Croatia	2–3	3–4	UEFA Euro 2008 qualifying
15	26 March 2008	Ramat Gan Stadium, Ramat Gan, Israel	Chile	1–0	1–0	Friendly
16	6 September 2008	Ramat Gan Stadium, Ramat Gan, Israel	Switzerland	1–2	2–2	2010 FIFA World Cup qualification
17	11 October 2008	Stade Josy Barthel, Luxembourg City, Luxembourg	Luxembourg	1–0	3–1	2010 FIFA World Cup qualification
18	15 October 2008	Skonto Stadium, Riga, Latvia	Latvia	1–0	1–1	2010 FIFA World Cup qualification
19	11 February 2009	Ramat Gan Stadium, Ramat Gan, Israel	Hungary	1–0	1–0	Friendly
— (Note: This was not a full international match and is therefore not included in Benayoun's total.)	3 March 2010	Dan Păltinişanu, Timișoara, Romania	Romania B	1–0	2–0	Friendly
20	2 September 2010	Ramat Gan Stadium, Ramat Gan, Israel	Malta	1–0	3–1	UEFA Euro 2012 qualifying
21	2 September 2010	Ramat Gan Stadium, Ramat Gan, Israel	Malta	2–1	3–1	UEFA Euro 2012 qualifying
22	2 September 2010	Ramat Gan Stadium, Ramat Gan, Israel	Malta	3–1	3–1	UEFA Euro 2012 qualifying
23	4 June 2011	Skonto Stadium, Riga, Latvia	Latvia	1–0	2–1	UEFA Euro 2012 qualifying

== Honours ==
Maccabi Haifa

- Israeli Premier League: 2000–01, 2001–02
- Israel State Cup: 2015–16

West Ham United

- FA Cup runner-up: 2005–06

Chelsea

- UEFA Europa League: 2012–13

Individual

- Israeli Footballer of the Year: 2000–01

== See also ==
- List of men's footballers with 100 or more international caps
- List of UEFA Champions League hat-tricks
- List of Premier League hat-tricks
- List of La Liga hat-tricks
- List of Jewish footballers
- List of Jews in sports
