= Eran Biton =

Israeli footballer

Personal information
- Full name: Eran Biton
- Date of birth: 16 January 1996 (age 30)
- Place of birth: Ramat Gan, Israel
- Height: 1.71 m (5 ft 7 in)
- Position: Midfielder

Team information
- Current team: Beitar Tel Aviv Bat Yam

Youth career
- Maccabi Ramat Amidar
- Maccabi Tel Aviv
- Maccabi Haifa

Senior career*
Years	Team	Apps	(Gls)
2014–2018	Maccabi Haifa	6	(0)
2016–2017	→ Maccabi Sha'arayim (loan)	30	(1)
2017–2018	→ Hapoel Afula (loan)	14	(0)
2018	Beitar Tel Aviv Ramla	6	(0)
2018–2019	Hapoel Ashkelon	26	(1)
2020–2021	Hapoel Acre	40	(2)
2021–2022	Hapoel Ra'anana	6	(0)
2022	Beitar Tel Aviv Bat Yam	12	(1)
2022–2023	Maccabi Ata Bialik	12	(2)
2023	Ironi Modi'in	2	(0)

International career
2011–2015	Israel U-19	2	(0)
- * Club domestic league appearances and goals

Eran Biton (Hebrew: ערן ביטון; born 16 January 1996) is an Israeli footballer who plays as a central midfielder. He currently plays for Ironi Modi'in.

== Early life ==
Biton was born in Ramat Gan, Israel, to a family of Sephardic Jewish descent.

== Honours ==
=== Club ===
Maccabi Haifa

- Israel State Cup: 2015–16

Maccabi Sha'arayim

- Toto Cup Leumit: 2016–17
