= Shahar Hirsh =

Israeli footballer

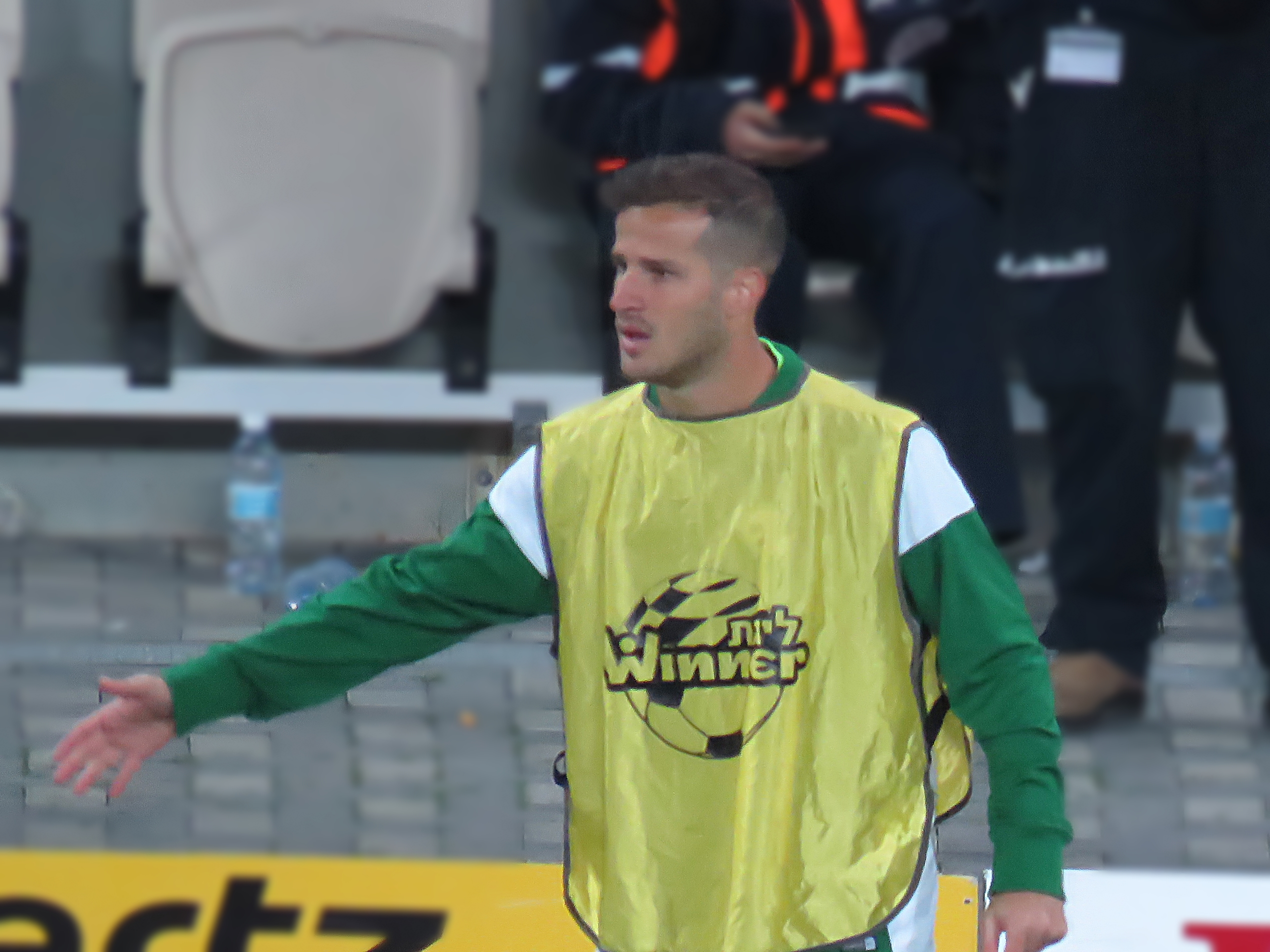

Personal information
- Full name: Shahar Hirsh
- Date of birth: February 13, 1993 (age 33)
- Place of birth: Haifa, Israel
- Position: Striker

Team information
- Current team: Hapoel Nof HaGalil
- Number: 17

Youth career
- 2002–2007: Maccabi Haifa
- 2007–2012: Hapoel Haifa

Senior career*
Years	Team	Apps	(Gls)
2011–2014	Hapoel Haifa	0	(0)
2013–2014	→ Hapoel Afula (loan)	27	(20)
2014–2017	Maccabi Haifa	14	(1)
2014–2015	→ Hapoel Petah Tikva (loan)	28	(9)
2016–2017	→ Hapoel Ra'anana (loan)	8	(0)
2017	→ Hapoel Tel Aviv (loan)	14	(2)
2017–2018	Hapoel Tel Aviv	30	(9)
2018–2019	Hapoel Ashkelon	8	(1)
2019–2021	Hapoel Tel Aviv	23	(6)
2021	Hapoel Ramat Gan	1	(0)
2021–2023	Hapoel Afula	56	(18)
2023–2024	Bnei Yehuda	34	(5)
2024–2025	Hapoel Kfar Shalem	29	(8)
2025–	Hapoel Nof HaGalil	20	(4)

International career
2011–2012	Israel U19	7	(2)
2014	Israel U21	3	(0)
- * Club domestic league appearances and goals as of 24 June 2026

Shahar Hirsh (Hebrew: שחר הירש; born 13 February 1993) is an Israeli footballer who plays as a forward for Hapoel Nof HaGalil.

== Club career ==
Hirsh started his career at Hapoel Haifa youth system. On September 18, 2013, he was loaned to Hapoel Afula, and scored 20 goals at 27 matches and finished the season as the top scorer of the league, in addition, he helped the team qualify to the top playoffs.

On March 13, 2014, Hirsh signed with Maccabi Haifa for 3 years. On July 16, 2014, he was loaned to Hapoel Petah Tikva. On 18 October 2014, he scored his first 2 goals at the win 4–1 against Hapoel Acre. Hirsh finished the season with 8 goals at the league, but relegated with the club to Liga Leumit.

== International career ==
On May 23, 2014, he made his debut at Israel national under-21 football team at the 3–2 victory against Serbia.

== Honours ==
Hapoel Haifa

- Toto Cup: 2012–13

Maccabi Haifa

- Israel State Cup: 2015–16

Individual

- Liga Leumit top goalscorer: 2013–14 (20 goals)

== Statistics ==
As of 1 June 2025

Club performance			League		Cup		League Cup		Continental		Total	
Season	Club	League	League		Israel State Cup		Toto Cup		Europe		Total	
Israel			Apps	Goals	Apps	Goals	Apps	Goals	Apps	Goals	Apps	Goals
2011–12	Hapoel Haifa	Israeli Premier League	0	0	0	0	1	0	0	0	1	0
2012–13	Hapoel Haifa	Israeli Premier League	0	0	0	0	1	0	0	0	1	0
2013–14	Hapoel Afula (loan)	Liga Leumit	27	20	2	5	0	0	0	0	29	25
2014–15	Hapoel Petah Tikva (loan)	Israeli Premier League	28	9	0	0	4	0	0	0	32	9
2015–16	Maccabi Haifa	Israeli Premier League	12	0	2	0	5	1	0	0	19	1
2016–17	Hapoel Ra'anana	Israeli Premier League	8	0	0	0	4	0	0	0	12	0
2016–17	Hapoel Tel Aviv	Israeli Premier League	14	2	1	0	0	0	0	0	15	2
2017–18	Hapoel Tel Aviv	Liga Leumit	30	9	2	0	1	0	0	0	33	9
2018–19	Hapoel Ashkelon	Liga Leumit	8	1	0	0	0	0	0	0	8	1
2018–19	Hapoel Tel Aviv	Israeli Premier League	10	4	0	0	0	0	0	0	10	4
2019–20	Hapoel Tel Aviv	Israeli Premier League	6	1	0	0	1	0	0	0	7	1
2020–21	Hapoel Tel Aviv	Israeli Premier League	7	1	0	0	3	0	0	0	10	1
2020–21	Hapoel Ramat Gan	Liga Leumit	15	1	1	1	0	0	0	0	16	2
2021–22	Hapoel Ramat Gan	Liga Leumit	1	0	0	0	4	0	0	0	5	0
2021–22	Hapoel Afula	Liga Leumit	20	7	0	0	0	0	0	0	20	27
2022–23	Hapoel Afula	Liga Leumit	36	11	4	3	4	1	0	0	44	15
2023–24	Bnei Yehuda	Liga Leumit	34	5	1	0	4	1	0	0	39	6
2024–25	Hapoel Kfar Shalem	Liga Leumit	29	8	1	0	2	0	0	0	32	8
Total			241	70	12	9	29	2	0	0	285	81
