= Shay Ben David =

Israeli footballer

Personal information
- Full name: Shay Pinhas Ben David
- Date of birth: 19 July 1997 (age 29)
- Place of birth: Tel Aviv, Israel
- Position: Defender

Team information
- Current team: Ironi Kiryat Shmona
- Number: 32

Youth career
- Maccabi Haifa

Senior career*
Years	Team	Apps	(Gls)
2017–2023	Maccabi Haifa	17	(0)
2017–2018	→ Hapoel Ashkelon (loan)	5	(0)
2018–2019	→ Hapoel Afula (loan)	34	(1)
2020	→ Trapani Calcio (loan)	1	(0)
2020–2021	→ San Fernando CD (loan)	3	(0)
2021	→ Hapoel Afula (loan)	15	(1)
2021–2022	→ F.C. Ashdod (loan)	0	(0)
2022–2023	→ Hapoel Kfar Saba (loan)	49	(1)
2023–	Ironi Kiryat Shmona	86	(1)
- * Club domestic league appearances and goals as of 24 June 2026

Shay Pinhas Ben David (Hebrew: שי פנחס בן דוד; born 19 July 1997 in Tel Aviv) is an Israeli footballer.

== Career ==
Ben David started his career with Israeli top flight side Maccabi Haifa.

In 2018, he was sent on loan to Hapoel Afula in the Israeli second division.

For the second half of 2019/20, Ben David was sent on loan to Italian second division club Trapani Calcio.

In 2020, he was sent on loan to San Fernando CD in the Spanish third division.
