= Ismaeel Ryan =

Israeli footballer

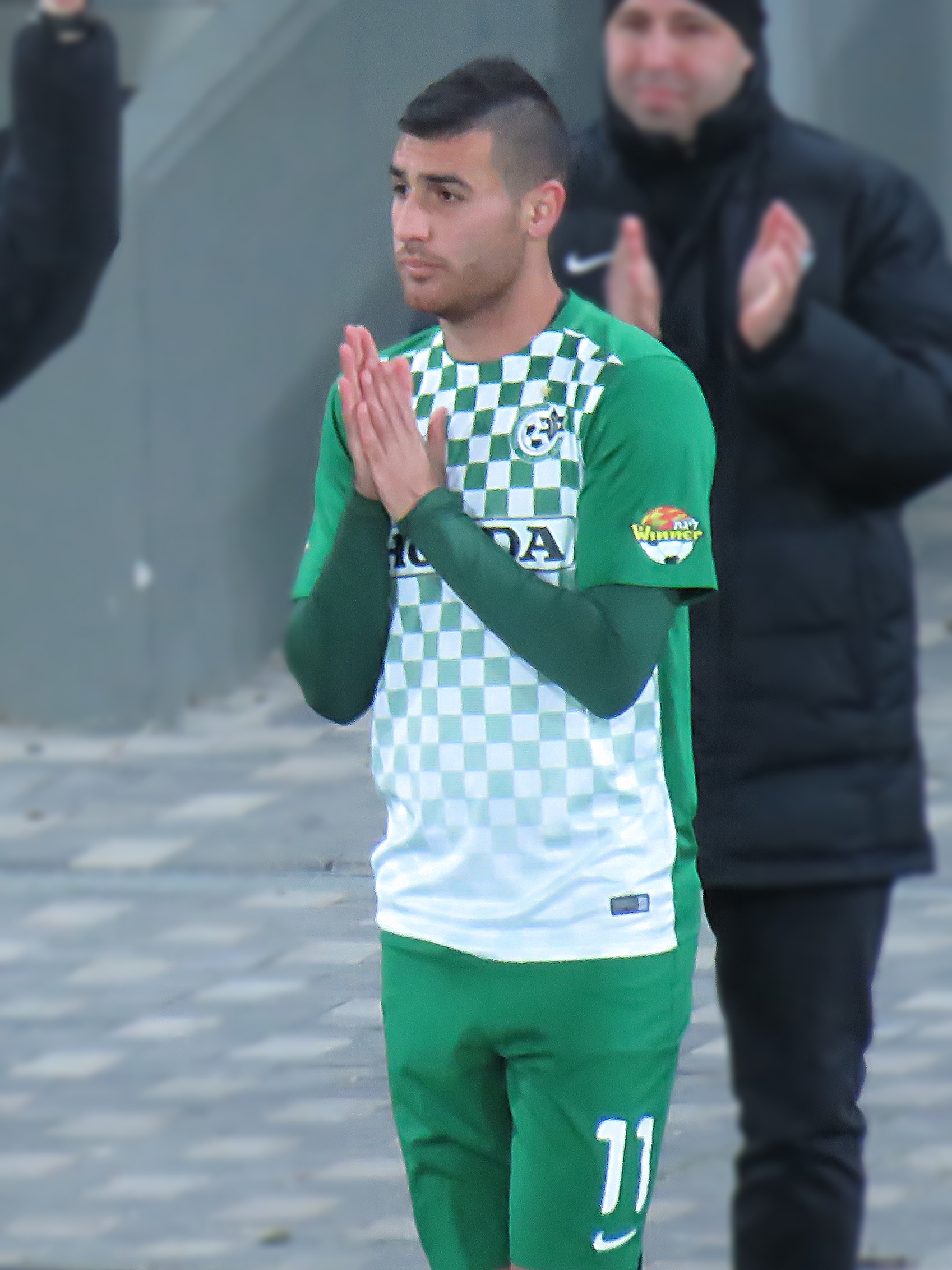
- Ryan playing for Maccabi Haifa in 2016

Personal information
- Full name: Ismaeel Ryan
- Date of birth: April 24, 1994 (age 32)
- Place of birth: Kabul, Israel
- Height: 1.78 m (5 ft 10 in)
- Position: Attacking midfielder

Team information
- Current team: Hapoel Ra'anana
- Number: 10

Youth career
- 2006–2013: Maccabi Haifa

Senior career*
Years	Team	Apps	(Gls)
2012–2017	Maccabi Haifa	51	(2)
2014	→ Hapoel Acre (loan)	11	(3)
2014–2015	→ Bnei Sakhnin	29	(4)
2017–2020	Ironi Kiryat Shmona	80	(12)
2020–2021	Adanaspor	13	(0)
2021	Bnei Sakhnin	11	(0)
2021–2022	Sektzia Ness Ziona	24	(3)
2022–2023	Hapoel Umm al-Fahm	8	(0)
2023	Hapoel Ramat Gan	12	(2)
2023–2024	Ihud Bnei Shefa-'Amr	19	(0)
2024–2025	Hapoel Afula	5	(0)
2025–	Hapoel Ra'anana	11	(1)

International career
2015–2017	Israel U21	6	(0)
- * Club domestic league appearances and goals as of 15 June 2025

Ismaeel Ryan (or Ismail Raiyan, Arabic: إسماعيل ريان, Hebrew: אסמאעיל ריאן; born 4 April 1994) is an Israeli professional footballer who plays as an attacking midfielder for Hapoel Ra'anana.

== Early life ==
Ryan was born in Kabul, Israel, to a Muslim-Arab family.

== Club career ==
In February 2014, he was loaned from Maccabi Haifa to Hapoel Acre until the end of the season.

On 7 August 2014 he was loaned to Bnei Sakhnin.

== Honours ==
=== Club ===
Maccabi Haifa

- Israel State Cup (1): 2015–16
