= 2011–12 Maccabi Haifa F.C. season =

Maccabi Haifa
2011–12 season
- Chairman: Ya'akov Shahar
- Manager: Elisha Levy
- Stadium: Kiryat Eliezer
- Ligat Ha'Al: 5th
- State Cup: Runners-up
- Toto Cup: Group stage
- UEFA Champions League: Play-off round
- UEFA Europa League: Group stage
- Top goalscorer: League: Wiyam Amashe (14); All: Wiyam Amashe (21)
- Highest home attendance: 20,000 vs K.R.C. Genk (17 August 2011)
- Lowest home attendance: 4,000 vs Bnei Sakhnin (13 August 2011)
- Average home league attendance: 10,143
Home colours	Away colours	Third colours

The 2011–12 season was Maccabi Haifa's 54th season in Israeli Premier League, and their 30th consecutive season in the top division of Israeli football.

This season is considered by Haifa as the "almost season". After winning the Israeli Premier League in the earlier season, the team started the season with qualification matches in the Champions League, but lost the last qualification match on penalties to the Belgian team Genk. At the UEFA Europa League the team failed to qualify for the playoff level after losing the last game to Schalke from Germany, while FC Steaua București from Romania won their respective match, therefore qualifying ahead of Haifa. Their Israeli Premier League campaign was one of their most disappointing seasons ever. Haifa wasn't one of the contenders for the title, and the last match ended as a draw, meaning the team did not qualify for the UEFA Europa League the followingseason. At the State Cup the team lost to Hapoel Tel Aviv through a 93' minute goal. This disappointing season caused the owner Ya'akov Shahar to appoint former player Reuven Atar as the manager for the next season instead of Elisha Levi.

== UEFA Champions League ==
=== Qualification ===
13 July 2011 Second round	Maccabi Haifa (Israel)	5–1	(Bosnia and Herzegovina) FK Borac	Haifa, Israel
19:00	Boccoli (yellow card) 23'; Amashe 45+1'; Buljat (yellow card) 58'; Yahaya (yellow card) 63'; Amashe 71'; Yampolsky 72'; Amashe 73'; Golasa 80'	Report	Raspudić 24'; Vidaković (yellow card) 90+3'	Stadium: Kiryat Eliezer Stadium; Attendance: 12,000; Referee: (Italy) Paolo Valeri

20 July 2011 Second round	FK Borac (Bosnia and Herzegovina)	3–2	(Israel) Maccabi Haifa	Banja Luka, Bosnia-Herzegovina
20:45	Ćorić 9'; Kovačević (yellow card) 17'; Mikić (yellow card) 19'; Ćorić 34'; Grahovac (yellow card) 42'; Vidaković 84'	Report	Dvalishvili 24'; Amashe (yellow card) 36'; Boccoli (yellow card) 45+2'; Dvalishvili 54'; Yahaya (yellow card) 90+1'	Stadium: Gradski Stadium; Attendance: 2,000; Referee: (Netherlands) Richard Liesveld

Maccabi Haifa won 7–4 on aggregate.

27 July 2011 Third round	Maccabi Haifa (Israel)	2–1	(Slovenia) Maribor	Haifa, Israel
20:00	Dvalishvili 8'; Golasa (yellow card) 52'; Yampolsky 70'; Vered (yellow card) 81'; Davidovich (yellow card) 84'	Report	Arghus (yellow card) 7'; Tavares 27'; Cvijanović (yellow card) 87'	Stadium: Kiryat Eliezer Stadium; Attendance: 10,000; Referee: (Portugal) Artur Soares

20 July 2011 Third round	Maribor (Slovenia)	1–1	(Israel) Maccabi Haifa	Maribor, Slovenia
20:45	Mezga (yellow card) 29'; Tavares 32'; Mejač (yellow card) 56'	Report	Vered 10'; Buljat (yellow card) 16'; Twatha (yellow card) 19'; Meshumar (yellow card) 75'; Dvalishvili (yellow card) 78'	Stadium: Ljudski vrt Attendance: 12,000; Referee: (France) Said Ennjimi

Maccabi Haifa won 3–2 on aggregate.

17 August 2011 Play-off round	Maccabi Haifa (Israel)	2–1	(Belgium) Genk	Ramat Gan, Israel
21:40	Amashe 8'; Dvalishvili 28'	Report	Barda 61'; Vossen (yellow card) 76'; Joneleit (yellow card) 84'	Stadium: Ramat Gan Stadium; Attendance: 20,000; Referee: (Germany) Wolfgang Stark

23 August 2011 play-off round	Genk (Belgium)	2–1 (4–1 p)	(Israel) Maccabi Haifa	Genk, Belgium
21:40	Vossen 35'; Buffel 41'	Report	I.Cohen (yellow card) 11' (yellow-red card) 109'; Meshumar (yellow card) 34'; Golasa 37'; Twatha (yellow card) 43'; Yahaya (yellow card) 54'; Falah (yellow card) 76'	Stadium: Cristal Arena; Attendance: 16,000; Referee: (England) Howard Webb
	Penalties
	Vossen (penalty scored); Hubert (penalty scored); Tőzsér (penalty scored); Pudil (penalty scored)		Dvalishvili (penalty missed); Golasa (penalty missed); Twatha (penalty scored)

3–3 on aggregate Genk won 4–1 on Penalties

== UEFA Europa League ==
=== Group J ===
15 September 2011 Group stage	Maccabi Haifa (Israel)	1–0	(Cyprus) AEK Larnaca	Haifa, Israel
22:05	Golasa (yellow card) 34'; Amashe (yellow card) 42'; Ghadir 54'; Boccoli (yellow card) 90+2'	Report	Dimech (yellow card) 52'; Skopelitis (yellow card) 71'; Linssen (yellow card) 81'; Murillo (red card) 82'; Priso (yellow card) 84'	Stadium: Kiryat Eliezer Stadium; Attendance: 11,000; Referee: (Czech Republic) Libor Kovařik

29 September 2011 Group stage	Schalke (Germany)	3–1	(Israel) Maccabi Haifa	Gelsenkirchen, Germany
19:00	Fuchs 8' 66'; Farfán (yellow card) 59'; Jurado 82'	Report	Vered 35'; T.Cohen (yellow card) 57'; Twatiha (yellow card) 73'; Dvalishvili (yellow card) 81'; Ottman (yellow card) 90'	Stadium: Arena AufSchalke; Attendance: 49,700; Referee: (Portugal) Manuel De Sousa

20 October 2011 Group stage	Maccabi Haifa (Israel)	5–0	(Romania) Steaua Bucharest	Haifa, Israel
20:00	Amashe 10', 20'; Yahaya (yellow card) 23'; Katan 38'; Twatiha 72'; Vered 79'	Report	Latovlevici (yellow card) 24'; Bicfalvi (red card) 37'; Tatu (yellow card) 56'; Iliev (red card) 64'	Stadium: Kiryat Eliezer Stadium; Attendance: 12,000; Referee: (Sweden) Daniel Stålhammar

3 November 2011 Group stage	Steaua Bucharest (Romania)	4–2	(Israel) Maccabi Haifa	Bucharest, Romania
22:00	Costea 28', (red card) 61'; Rusescu (yellow card) 26'; Bourceanu (yellow card) 32'; Tănase 64', 84'; Tănase (yellow card) 84'; Nikolić (yellow card) 89'	Report	Meshumar 36'; Katan 40'; Golasa (yellow card) 69'; Amashe (yellow card) 89'	Stadium: National Arena; Attendance: 30,000; Referee: (Netherlands) Kevin Blom

13 July 2011 Group stage	AEK Larnaca (Cyprus)	2–1	(Israel) Maccabi Haifa	Nicosia, Cyprus
19:00	García 14'; Pintado 511'	Report	Dgani (yellow card) 45+1'; Yampolsky (yellow card) 70'; Buljat 75'	Stadium: GSP Stadium; Attendance: 5,000; Referee: (England) Andre Marriner

13 July 2011 Group stage	Maccabi Haifa (Israel)	0–3	(Germany) Schalke	Haifa, Israel
22:00	Buljat 7' (o.g.); Yahaya (yellow card) 17'; Golasa (yellow card) 44'	Report	Marica (yellow card) 15', (goal) 84'; Draxler (yellow card) 32'; Wiegel 90+2'	Stadium: Kiryat Eliezer Stadium; Attendance: 12,000; Referee: (France) Fredy Fautrel

Pos	Team	Pld	W	D	L	GF	GA	GD	Pts	Qualification	SCH	SB	MHA	AEK
1	(Germany) Schalke 04	6	4	2	0	13	2	+11	14	Advance to knockout phase	—	2–1	3–1	0–0
2	(Romania) Steaua București	6	2	2	2	9	11	−2	8	Advance to knockout phase	0–0	—	4–2	3–1
3	(Israel) Maccabi Haifa	6	2	0	4	10	12	−2	6		0–3	5–0	—	1–0
4	(Cyprus) AEK Larnaca	6	1	2	3	4	11	−7	5		0–5	1–1	2–1	—

Source: Soccerway

== Ligat Ha'al ==
=== Regular season ===
20 August 2011 1	Maccabi Netanya	1–4	Maccabi Haifa	Netanya, Israel
17:15	Mugrabi 21'		Amashe 29' Amashe 55'; Amashe 61' Amashe 86'	Stadium: Sar-Tov Stadium; Attendance: 3,000; Referee: Meir Levi

27 August 2011 2	Maccabi Haifa	2–2	Hapoel Petah Tikva	Haifa, Israel
17:15	Fishbein 79' Bugala 87'		Amashe 46'; Ghadir 75'	Stadium: Kiryat Eliezer Stadium; Attendance: 50; Referee: Liran Liany

10 September 2011 3	F.C. Ashdod	1–0	Maccabi Haifa	Ashdod, Israel
19:10	Hogirat 83'			Stadium: Yud-Alef Stadium; Attendance: 4,000; Referee: Alon Yefet

18 September 2011 4	Maccabi Haifa	3–1	Hapoel Rishon LeZion	Haifa, Israel
20:00	I. Cohen 71' Falah 89' Amashe 46'		Baldout 8'	Stadium: Kiryat Eliezer Stadium; Attendance: 7,000; Referee: Eli Chachmon

Date	Opponents	H / A	Result F – A	Scorers	Attendance
21 September 2011	Bnei Sakhnin	A	0–2		2,500
24 September 2011	Ironi Ramat HaSharon	H	5–0	Katan 14', Amashe 43', Falah 45', Vered 56', Ottman 72'	8,000
3 October 2011	Maccabi Tel Aviv	A	1–1	Golasa 27'	15,000
15 October 2011	Hapoel Be'er Sheva	A	1–1	Meshumar 45'	6,000
23 October 2011	Ironi Kiryat Shmona	H	0–3		8,000
29 October 2011	Maccabi Petah Tikva	A	4–1	Amashe (3) 3', 9', 62', Yampolsky 36'	3,000
6 November 2011	Bnei Yehuda Tel Aviv	H	1–1	Azriel 31'	8,000
21 November 2011	Beitar Jerusalem	A	4–1	Amashe (2) 26', 90', Dvalishvili (2) 61', 67'	16,000
26 November 2011	Hapoel Akko	H	1–0	Dvalishvili 55'	8,500
5 December 2011	Hapoel Tel Aviv	A	0–3		14,500
10 December 2011	Hapoel Haifa	H	1–3	Dvalishvili 22'	13,500
19 December 2011	Maccabi Netanya	H	2–1	Amashe 50', Yampolsky 80'	8,000
24 December 2011	Hapoel Petah Tikva	A	1–3	Turgeman 63'	7,000
28 December 2011	F.C. Ashdod	H	1–1	Dvalishvili 65'	8,000
31 December 2011	Ironi Rishon LeZion	A	2–4	Dvalishvili 4', 8'	3,000
9 January 2012	Bnei Sakhnin	H	0–0		6,000
14 January 2012	Ironi Ramat HaSharon	A	0–0		2,000
23 January 2012	Maccabi Tel Aviv	H	2–1	Vered 84, Twatiha 90	12,500
28 January 2012	Hapoel Be'er Sheva	H	3–1	Golasa 11', Ghadir 49' Turgeman 92'	9,000
5 February 2012	Ironi Kiryat Shmona	A	0–1		5,000
13 February 2012	Maccabi Petah Tikva	H	4–1	Katan 8' Ghadir 24' Turgeman 50' 64'	6,000
19 October 2011	Bnei Yehuda Tel Aviv	A	0–0		4,000
26 February 2012	Beitar Jerusalem	H	1–0	Ghadir 33'	12,000
4 March 2012	Hapoel Akko	A	1–0	Golasa 5'	4,000
12 March 2012	Hapoel Tel Aviv	H	1–4	Vered 48'	10,000
17 March 2012	Hapoel Haifa	A	1–1	Cesarec 93'	7,500

Pos	Team	Pld	W	D	L	GF	GA	GD	Pts	Qualification
4	F.C. Ironi Ashdod	30	12	11	7	39	33	+6	47	Qualification for the championship round
5	Maccabi Netanya	30	13	8	9	44	40	+4	47	Qualification for the championship round
6	Maccabi Haifa	30	12	9	9	46	39	+7	45	Qualification for the championship round
7	Maccabi Tel Aviv	30	13	5	12	41	32	+9	44	Qualification for the championship round
8	Bnei Yehuda	30	11	10	9	38	27	+11	43	Qualification for the championship round

Source: Israel Football Association
Rules for classification: 1st points; 2nd goal difference; 3rd matches won; 4th goals scored; 5th head-to-head; 6th decision match

=== Top playoff ===
Date	Opponents	H / A	Result F – A	Scorers	Attendance
24 March 2012	Bnei Sakhnin	A	2–0	Yampolsky 24', Katan 73'	1,200
2 April 2012	F.C. Ashdod	H	3–0	Yampolsky 45', Katan 80', Yahaya 85'	6,500
14 April 2012	Maccabi Netanya	A	0–1		3,500
28 April 2012	Bnei Yehuda Tel Aviv	A	1–2	Turgeman 69'	2,000
6 May 2012	Maccabi Tel Aviv	H	2–1	Katan 12', Amashe 24'	10,000
9 May 2012	Ironi Kiryat Shmona	A	1–0	Turgeman 12'	3,000
12 May 2012	Hapoel Tel Aviv	H	1–1	Katan 23'	11,000

Pos	Team	Pld	W	D	L	GF	GA	GD	Pts	Qualification
3	Bnei Yehuda	37	16	11	10	53	36	+17	59	Qualification for the Europa League second qualifying round (Note: Hapoel Tel Aviv qualified for the play-off round of the 2012–13 UEFA Europa League after winning the 2011–12 Israel State Cup. As they finished second, the fourth-placed team of the league also qualified for the Europa League.)
4	Maccabi Netanya	37	17	8	12	54	48	+6	59	Qualification for the Europa League second qualifying round
5	Maccabi Haifa	37	16	10	11	56	44	+12	58	
6	Maccabi Tel Aviv	37	16	7	14	55	43	+12	55	
7	F.C. Ironi Ashdod	37	14	12	11	44	44	0	54	

Source: Israel Football Association
Rules for classification: 1st points; 2nd goal difference; 3rd matches won; 4th goals scored; 5th head-to-head; 6th decision match

== Israel State Cup ==
2 December 2011 Eighth Round	Maccabi Be'er Sheva	1–2	Maccabi Haifa	Be'er Sheva, Israel
20:45	Adir Danin 90'		Buljat (yellow card) 12'; Cocalić 36'; Boccoli (yellow card) 44'	Stadium: Vasermil Stadium; Attendance: 2,000; Referee: Ziv Adlar

21 March 2012 Round of 16	Hapoel Kfar Saba	0–0 (3–4 p)	Maccabi Haifa	Kfar Saba, Israel
20:45	Itzahk (yellow card) 12'; Banish (yellow card) 49'; Regav (yellow card) 82'		Rozenbom (yellow card) 45'; Vered (yellow card) 50'	Stadium: Levita Stadium; Attendance: 5,000; Referee: Roei Rainsriber
	Penalties
	Azuri (penalty missed); David (penalty scored); Banish (penalty scored); Oshwo (penalty scored); Itzahk (penalty missed)		Amashe (penalty scored); Azriel (penalty missed); Cocalić (penalty scored); Yampolsky (penalty scored); Falah (penalty scored)

20 April 2012 Quarter-final	Maccabi Haifa	2–0	Hapoel Nazareth Illit	Haifa, Israel
20:00	Turgeman 6'; Turgeman (yellow card) 23'; Buljat (yellow card) 35'; Katan 45'		Hogirat (yellow card) 18'; Diab (yellow card) 21'	Stadium: Kiryat Eliezer Stadium; Attendance: 9,000; Referee: Orel Greenfeld

2 May 2012 Semi-final	Maccabi Haifa	2–1	F.C. Ashdod	Ramat Gan, Israel
21:00	Yampolsky 29'; Yahaya (yellow card) 43'; Katan 50'		Biton 34'; Ambrose (yellow card) 52'; Revivo (yellow card) 59'	Stadium: Ramat Gan Stadium; Attendance: 20,000; Referee: Liran Liani

15 May 2012 Final	Hapoel Tel Aviv	2–1	Maccabi Haifa	Ramat Gan, Israel
20:00	Oremuš 58'; Igiebor 90+2'; Igiebor (yellow card) 90+3'		Meshumar (yellow card) 22'; Yampolsky 62'	Stadium: Ramat Gan Stadium; Attendance: 37,000; Referee: Alon Yefat

== Toto Cup ==
Date	Opponents	H / A	Result F – A	Scorers	Attendance
30 July 2011	Ironi Kiryat Shmona	A	1–2	Azulay 51'	2,000
6 August 2011	Hapoel Haifa	A	1–1	Ghadir 34'	8,000
13 August 2011	Bnei Sakhnin	H	1–0	Amashe 17'	4,000

Pos	Team	Pld	W	D	L	GF	GA	GD	Pts	IKS	BnS	MHA	HHA
1	Ironi Kiryat Shmona (A)	3	2	0	1	4	4	0	6			2–1	2–1
2	Bnei Sakhnin (A)	3	1	1	1	3	1	+2	4	2–0			1–1
3	Maccabi Haifa	3	1	1	1	3	3	0	4		1–0		
4	Hapoel Haifa	3	0	2	1	3	4	−1	2			1–1	

Source: football.org.il (in Hebrew)
Rules for classification: 1st points; 2nd goal difference; 3rd matches won; 4th goals scored; 5th head-to-head; 6th decision match
(A) Advanced to the quarterfinals

== Squad statistics ==
No.	Name	Europe					League					State Cup					Toto Cup					Total				
No.	Name	Appearances	Minutes	Yellow card	Red card	Goals	Appearances	Minutes	Yellow card	Red card	Goals	Appearances	Minutes	Yellow card	Red card	Goals	Appearances	Minutes	Yellow card	Red card	Goals	Appearances	Minutes	Yellow card	Red card	Goals
1	(Israel) Nir Davidovich	7	615	1	0	0	17	1492	0	0	0	4	390	0	0	0	2	125	0	1	0	30	2662	1	1	0
2	(Israel) Sari Falah	8	669	1	0	0	22	1712	5	0	2	2	122	0	0	0	3	270	0	0	0	35	2771	6	0	2
3	(Croatia) Jurica Buljat	9	810	2	0	1	31	2812	4	0	0	5	480	1	0	0	2	180	0	0	0	47	4282	7	0	1
4	(Israel) Orel Dgani	3	225	1	0	0	15	1275	4	0	0	0	0	0	0	0	0	0	0	0	0	18	1500	5	0	0
4	(Israel) Shai Maimon	0	0	0	0	0	0	0	0	0	0	0	0	0	0	0	1	14	0	0	0	1	14	0	0	0
5	(Israel) Itzik Cohen	3	289	1	1	0	9	732	0	0	1	0	0	0	0	0	1	90	0	0	0	13	1111	1	1	1
6	(Ghana) Seidu Yahaya	10	899	5	0	0	35	2947	5	0	1	4	360	1	0	0	3	262	0	0	0	52	4468	11	0	1
7	(Brazil) Gustavo Boccoli	10	494	3	0	0	27	1785	7	0	0	5	347	0	0	0	2	166	0	0	0	44	2802	10	0	0
8	(Israel) Haim Megrelashvili	0	0	0	0	0	2	38	0	0	0	0	0	0	0	0	3	136	0	0	0	5	174	0	0	0
8	(Israel) Hen Azriel	4	116	0	0	0	12	531	0	1	1	2	90	1	0	0	2	90	0	0	0	20	827	0	1	1
9	(Georgia (country)) Vladimir Dvalishvili	10	748	2	0	4	12	662	3	0	7	0	0	0	0	0	0	0	0	0	0	22	1410	5	0	11
9	(Croatia) Danijel Cesarec	0	0	0	0	0	8	192	0	0	1	1	74	0	0	0	0	0	0	0	0	9	264	0	0	1
11	(Israel) Idan Vered	12	892	1	0	3	31	1977	5	0	3	4	389	1	0	0	3	134	1	0	0	50	3419	8	0	6
11	(Israel) Roi Atar	0	0	0	0	0	1	20	0	0	0	0	0	0	0	0	0	0	0	0	0	1	20	0	0	0
12	(Israel) Shoval Gozlan	0	0	0	0	0	6	108	0	0	0	2	57	0	0	0	0	0	0	0	0	8	165	0	0	0
12	(Israel) Shadi Shaban	0	0	0	0	0	0	0	0	0	0	0	0	0	0	0	2	65	0	0	0	2	65	0	0	0
13	(Israel) Taleb Twatiha	12	1110	2	0	1	28	2342	1	0	1	4	280	0	0	0	3	142	0	0	0	47	3874	3	0	2
14	(Israel) Wiyam Amashe	12	954	3	0	6	28	2132	2	0	14	4	315	0	0	0	3	152	0	0	1	47	3553	5	0	21
15	(Israel) Eyal Golasa	12	1102	4	0	2	24	2018	2	1	3	2	141	0	0	0	0	0	0	0	0	38	2804	6	1	5
16	(Israel) Mohammad Ghadir	5	151	0	0	1	22	1264	4	0	4	4	219	0	0	0	3	247	0	0	1	34	1881	4	0	6
17	(Israel) Alon Turgeman	3	55	0	0	0	29	1374	2	0	6	5	247	1	0	1	1	23	0	0	0	38	1708	3	0	7
18	(Israel) Ali Ottman	3	181	1	0	0	18	1446	3	0	1	2	210	0	0	0	3	180	1	0	0	26	2007	5	0	1
19	(Israel) Shlomi Azulay	1	46	0	0	0	1	49	0	0	0	0	0	0	0	0	3	221	0	0	1	5	316	0	0	1
19	(Israel) Ismaeel Ryan	0	0	0	0	0	1	56	0	0	0	0	0	0	0	0	0	0	0	0	0	1	56	0	0	0
19	(Israel) Ataa Jaber	0	0	0	0	0	1	47	0	0	0	0	0	0	0	0	0	0	0	0	0	1	47	0	0	0
20	(Israel) Yaniv Katan	7	492	0	0	2	31	2276	4	0	6	3	249	0	0	2	0	0	0	0	0	41	3017	4	0	10
21	(Israel) Tamir Cohen	6	202	1	0	0	14	684	2	0	0	0	0	0	0	0	0	0	0	0	0	20	886	3	0	0
22	(Serbia) Bojan Šaranov	6	495	0	0	0	21	1838	3	0	0	1	90	0	0	0	2	135	0	0	0	30	2558	3	0	0
23	(Israel) Dor Kochav	0	0	0	0	0	0	0	0	0	0	1	11	0	0	0	0	0	0	0	0	1	11	0	0	0
23	(Israel) Eran Rozenbom	0	0	0	0	0	4	37	0	0	0	1	103	1	0	0	0	0	0	0	0	5	140	1	0	0
24	(Ukraine) Andriy Pylyavskyi	3	261	0	0	0	0	0	0	0	0	0	0	0	0	0	0	0	0	0	0	3	261	0	0	0
25	(Bosnia and Herzegovina) Edin Cocalić	0	0	0	0	0	16	1383	3	0	0	5	478	0	0	1	0	0	0	0	0	21	1861	3	0	1
26	(Israel) Dela Yampolsky	9	378	1	0	2	26	1383	2	0	4	5	268	0	0	2	3	185	0	0	0	43	2214	3	0	8
27	(Israel) Eyal Meshumar	10	930	2	0	1	20	1574	4	1	1	4	360	1	0	1	2	97	0	0	0	36	2931	7	1	3
28	(Ecuador) Marlon de Jesús	2	85	0	0	0	6	347	0	0	0	0	0	0	0	0	0	0	0	0	0	8	432	0	0	0
30	(Lithuania) Martinez Dapakos	0	0	0	0	0	0	0	0	0	0	0	0	0	0	0	1	46	0	0	0	1	46	0	0	0
