= 2011–12 UEFA Champions League qualifying =

European football tournament

2011–12 UEFA Champions League qualifying was the preliminary phase of the 2011–12 UEFA Champions League, prior to the competition proper. Qualification consisted of the qualifying phase (first to third rounds) and the play-off round.

All times are CEST (UTC+02:00).

== Round and draw dates ==
All draws held at UEFA headquarters in Nyon, Switzerland.

Round	Draw date	First leg	Second leg
First qualifying round	20 June 2011	28–29 June 2011	5–6 July 2011
Second qualifying round	20 June 2011	12–13 July 2011	19–20 July 2011
Third qualifying round	15 July 2011	26–27 July 2011	2–3 August 2011
Play-off round	5 August 2011	16–17 August 2011	23–24 August 2011

== Format ==
There are two routes which the teams are separated into during qualifying:

- Champions Route, which includes all domestic champions which did not automatically qualify for the group stage.
- League Route (also called the Non-champions Path or the Best-placed Path), which includes all non-domestic champions which did not automatically qualify for the group stage.

Each tie is played over two legs, with each team playing one leg at home. The team that has the higher aggregate score over the two legs progresses to the next round. In the event that aggregate scores finish level, the away goals rule is applied, i.e. the team that scored more goals away from home over the two legs progresses. If away goals are also equal, then 30 minutes of extra time are played, divided into two 15-minute halves. The away goals rule is again applied after extra time, i.e. if there are goals scored during extra time and the aggregate score is still level, the visiting team qualifies by virtue of more away goals scored. If no goals are scored during extra time, the tie is decided by penalty shoot-out.

In the draw for each round, teams are seeded based on their 2011 UEFA club coefficients, with the teams divided into seeded and unseeded pots. A seeded team is drawn against an unseeded team, with the order of legs in each tie decided randomly. Due to the limited time between matches, the draws for the second and third qualifying rounds take place before the results of the previous round are known. The seeding in each draw is carried out under the assumption that all of the highest-ranked clubs of the previous round are victorious. If a lower-ranked club is victorious, it simply takes the place of its defeated opponent in the next round. Prior to the draw, UEFA may form "groups" in accordance with the principles set by the Club Competitions Committee, but they are purely for convenience of the draw and do not resemble any real groupings in the sense of the competition, while ensuring that teams from the same association are not drawn against each other.

== Teams ==
Below are the 54 teams (39 in Champions Route, 15 in League Route) involved in the qualifying phase and play-off round, grouped by their starting rounds. The 10 winners of the play-off round (5 in Champions Route, 5 in League Route) qualify for the group stage to join the 22 automatic qualifiers. The losing teams from the third qualifying round and the play-off round enter the Europa League play-off round and group stage respectively.

Key to colours
Qualified for the group stage
Eliminated in the play-off round; Advanced to the Europa League group stage
Eliminated in the third qualifying round; Advanced to the Europa League play-off round

=== Champions Route ===
Third qualifying round
Team	Coeff
(Scotland) Rangers	56.028
(Denmark) Copenhagen	51.110
(Belgium) Genk	8.400

Second qualifying round
Team	Coeff
(Belarus) BATE Borisov	23.216
(Israel) Maccabi Haifa	21.400
(Croatia) Dinamo Zagreb	20.224
(Norway) Rosenborg	19.375
(Serbia) Partizan	15.850
(Cyprus) APOEL	13.124
(Poland) Wisła Kraków	10.183
(Austria) Sturm Graz	8.640
(Bulgaria) Litex Lovech	8.575
(Slovakia) Slovan Bratislava	5.899
(Czech Republic) Viktoria Plzeň	5.170
(Slovenia) Maribor	4.224
(Finland) HJK	3.793
(Lithuania) Ekranas	3.541
(Georgia (country)) Zestaponi	2.891
(Sweden) Malmö FF	2.825
(Republic of Ireland) Shamrock Rovers	2.741
(Moldova) Dacia Chișinău	2.549
(Armenia) Pyunik	2.516
(Bosnia and Herzegovina) Borac Banja Luka	2.324
(Montenegro) Mogren	2.275
(Latvia) Skonto	2.233
(Hungary) Videoton	2.200
(Wales) Bangor City	2.058
(Faroe Islands) HB	1.783
(Northern Ireland) Linfield	1.699
(Kazakhstan) Tobol	1.624
(Estonia) Flora	1.508
(Iceland) Breiðablik	1.491
(Azerbaijan) Neftçi	1.233
(North Macedonia) Shkëndija	1.041
(Albania) Skënderbeu	0.774

First qualifying round
Team	Coeff
(Luxembourg) F91 Dudelange	1.524
(Malta) Valletta	1.483
(Andorra) FC Santa Coloma	1.200
(San Marino) Tre Fiori	1.183

=== League Route ===
Play-off round
Team	Coeff
(Germany) Bayern Munich	118.887
(England) Arsenal	108.157
(France) Lyon	92.735
(Spain) Villarreal	75.465
(Italy) Udinese	27.110

Third qualifying round
Team	Coeff
(Portugal) Benfica	81.319
(Ukraine) Dynamo Kyiv	60.776
(Greece) Panathinaikos	57.833
(Netherlands) Twente	41.025
(Belgium) Standard Liège	32.400
(Russia) Rubin Kazan	31.941
(Switzerland) Zürich	18.980
(Denmark) Odense	18.610
(Turkey) Trabzonspor	12.010
(Romania) Vaslui	10.164

Notes

1. Trabzonspor also qualified for the group stage after they replaced Fenerbahçe, which was suspended by the Turkish Football Federation on 24 August 2011 from participating in the 2011–12 UEFA Champions League due to the ongoing investigation into match-fixing.

== First qualifying round ==
=== Seeding ===
Seeded	Unseeded
(Luxembourg) F91 Dudelange (Malta) Valletta	(Andorra) FC Santa Coloma (San Marino) Tre Fiori

=== Summary ===
Team 1	Agg.	Team 2	1st leg	2nd leg
Tre Fiori (San Marino)	1–5	(Malta) Valletta	0–3	1–2
FC Santa Coloma (Andorra)	0–4	(Luxembourg) F91 Dudelange	0–2	0–2

=== Matches ===
28 June 2011
20:30

Tre Fiori (San Marino)	0–3	(Malta) Valletta
	Report	Denni 43'; Effiong 50'; G. Agius 70' (pen.)

Stadio Olimpico, Serravalle
Attendance: 544
Referee: Alan Muir (Scotland)
6 July 2011
19:30

Valletta (Malta)	2–1	(San Marino) Tre Fiori
Zammit 58' (pen.); William Barbosa 88'	Report	Lisi 21' (pen.)

Hibernians Ground, Paola
Attendance: 1,616
Referee: Bardhyl Pashaj (Albania)

Valletta won 5–1 on aggregate.

28 June 2011
19:00

FC Santa Coloma (Andorra)	0–2	(Luxembourg) F91 Dudelange
	Report	Legros 57'; Caillet 79'

Estadi Comunal d'Andorra la Vella, Andorra la Vella
Attendance: 300
Referee: Elmir Pilav (Bosnia and Herzegovina)
5 July 2011
18:30

F91 Dudelange (Luxembourg)	2–0	(Andorra) FC Santa Coloma
Abdullei 60', 89'	Report

Stade Jos Nosbaum, Dudelange
Attendance: 1,015
Referee: Gabriele Rossi (San Marino)

F91 Dudelange won 4–0 on aggregate.

== Second qualifying round ==
=== Seeding ===
Group 1		Group 2		Group 3	
Seeded	Unseeded	Seeded	Unseeded	Seeded	Unseeded
(Israel) Maccabi Haifa (Cyprus) APOEL (Bulgaria) Litex Lovech (Slovakia) Slovan Bratislava (Slovenia) Maribor	(Bosnia and Herzegovina) Borac Banja Luka (Montenegro) Mogren (Kazakhstan) Tobol (Luxembourg) F91 Dudelange (Albania) Skënderbeu	(Croatia) Dinamo Zagreb (Serbia) Partizan (Austria) Sturm Graz (Czech Republic) Viktoria Plzeň (Lithuania) Ekranas (Georgia (country)) Zestaponi	(Moldova) Dacia Chișinău (Armenia) Pyunik (Hungary) Videoton (Malta) Valletta (Azerbaijan) Neftçi (North Macedonia) Shkëndija	(Belarus) BATE Borisov (Norway) Rosenborg (Poland) Wisła Kraków (Finland) HJK (Sweden) Malmö FF (Republic of Ireland) Shamrock Rovers	(Latvia) Skonto (Wales) Bangor City (Faroe Islands) HB (Northern Ireland) Linfield (Estonia) Flora (Iceland) Breiðablik

Notes

1. ^{†} Winners of the previous qualifying round whose identity was not known at the time of the draw.

=== Summary ===
Team 1	Agg.	Team 2	1st leg	2nd leg
Maccabi Haifa (Israel)	7–4	(Bosnia and Herzegovina) Borac Banja Luka	5–1	2–3
Mogren (Montenegro)	1–5	(Bulgaria) Litex Lovech	1–2	0–3
Maribor (Slovenia)	5–1	(Luxembourg) F91 Dudelange	2–0	3–1
Skënderbeu (Albania)	0–6	(Cyprus) APOEL	0–2	0–4
Slovan Bratislava (Slovakia)	3–1	(Kazakhstan) Tobol	2–0	1–1
Sturm Graz (Austria)	4–3	(Hungary) Videoton	2–0	2–3
Zestaponi (Georgia (country))	3–2	(Moldova) Dacia Chișinău	3–0	0–2
Dinamo Zagreb (Croatia)	3–0	(Azerbaijan) Neftçi	3–0	0–0
Pyunik (Armenia)	1–9	(Czech Republic) Viktoria Plzeň	0–4	1–5
Partizan (Serbia)	5–0	(North Macedonia) Shkëndija	4–0	1–0
Valletta (Malta)	2–4	(Lithuania) Ekranas	2–3	0–1
Malmö FF (Sweden)	3–1	(Faroe Islands) HB	2–0	1–1
Shamrock Rovers (Republic of Ireland)	1–0	(Estonia) Flora	1–0	0–0
Rosenborg (Norway)	5–2	(Iceland) Breiðablik	5–0	0–2
Bangor City (Wales)	0–13 (Note: Order of legs reversed after original draw.)	(Finland) HJK	0–3	0–10
Skonto (Latvia)	0–3	(Poland) Wisła Kraków	0–1	0–2
Linfield (Northern Ireland)	1–3	(Belarus) BATE Borisov	1–1	0–2

=== Matches ===
13 July 2011
19:00

Maccabi Haifa (Israel)	5–1	(Bosnia and Herzegovina) Borac Banja Luka
Amasha 45+1', 71', 73'; Yampolsky 72'; Golasa 80'	Report	Raspudić 24'

Kiryat Eliezer Stadium, Haifa
Attendance: 9,750
Referee: Paolo Valeri (Italy)
20 July 2011
20:45

Borac Banja Luka (Bosnia and Herzegovina)	3–2	(Israel) Maccabi Haifa
Krunić 9', 34'; Vidaković 84'	Report	Dvalishvili 24', 54'

Gradski stadion, Banja Luka
Attendance: 4,000
Referee: Richard Liesveld (Netherlands)

Maccabi Haifa won 7–4 on aggregate.

12 July 2011
20:00

Mogren (Montenegro)	1–2	(Bulgaria) Litex Lovech
M. Zec 14'	Report	Todorov 77', 79'

Podgorica City Stadium, Podgorica (Note: Mogren played their home match at Podgorica City Stadium, Podgorica as their own Stadion Lugovi did not meet UEFA criteria.)
Attendance: 1,500
Referee: Gediminas Mažeika (Lithuania)
19 July 2011
19:00

Litex Lovech (Bulgaria)	3–0	(Montenegro) Mogren
Zanev 3'; Todorov 49' (pen.); Yanev 80'	Report

Lovech Stadium, Lovech
Attendance: 4,000
Referee: Andre Marriner (England)

Litex Lovech won 5–1 on aggregate.

12 July 2011
20:00

Maribor (Slovenia)	2–0	(Luxembourg) F91 Dudelange
Arghus 36'; Ibraimi 45'	Report

Ljudski vrt, Maribor
Attendance: 5,500
Referee: Veaceslav Banari (Moldova)
19 July 2011
18:00

F91 Dudelange (Luxembourg)	1–3	(Slovenia) Maribor
da Mota 54'	Report	Mezga 26', 76' (pen.); Berić 72'

Stade Jos Nosbaum, Dudelange
Attendance: 1,152
Referee: Marco Borg (Malta)

Maribor won 5–1 on aggregate.

13 July 2011
20:00

Skënderbeu (Albania)	0–2	(Cyprus) APOEL
	Report	Morais 52'; Manduca 56'

Skënderbeu Stadium, Korçë
Attendance: 5,000
Referee: Ján Valášek (Slovakia)
20 July 2011
19:00

APOEL (Cyprus)	4–0	(Albania) Skënderbeu
Solari 59'; Aílton 66'; Adorno 80'; Charalambidis 86'	Report

GSP Stadium, Nicosia
Attendance: 11,271
Referee: Andrea De Marco (Italy)

APOEL won 6–0 on aggregate.

12 July 2011
20:15

Slovan Bratislava (Slovakia)	2–0	(Kazakhstan) Tobol
Šebo 41'; Guédé 81'	Report

Štadión Pasienky, Bratislava
Attendance: 5,128
Referee: Viktor Shvetsov (Ukraine)
19 July 2011
18:00

Tobol (Kazakhstan)	1–1	(Slovakia) Slovan Bratislava
Štepanovský 62' (o.g.)	Report	Kladrubský 16'

Kostanay Central Stadium, Kostanay
Attendance: 6,800
Referee: Ante Vučemilović-Šimunović Jr. (Croatia)

Slovan Bratislava won 3–1 on aggregate.

13 July 2011
20:30

Sturm Graz (Austria)	2–0	(Hungary) Videoton
Szabics 68'; Kienast 90+2'	Report

Hypo-Arena, Klagenfurt (Note: Sturm Graz played their home match at Hypo-Arena, Klagenfurt as their own UPC-Arena was one of the venues for the 2011 IFAF World Championship.)
Attendance: 11,500
Referee: Stuart Attwell (England)
20 July 2011
20:30

Videoton (Hungary)	3–2	(Austria) Sturm Graz
Elek 27'; Sándor 32'; Lipták 45+2'	Report	Hölzl 28'; Feldhofer 39'

Sóstói Stadion, Székesfehérvár
Attendance: 8,760
Referee: Aleksandar Stavrev (Macedonia)

Sturm Graz won 4–3 on aggregate.

13 July 2011
18:00

Zestaponi (Georgia (country))	3–0	(Moldova) Dacia Chișinău
Gelashvili 14'; Dvali 23', 40'	Report

David Abashidze Stadium, Zestaponi
Attendance: 4,458
Referee: Halis Özkahya (Turkey)
20 July 2011
19:00

Dacia Chișinău (Moldova)	2–0	(Georgia (country)) Zestaponi
Popovici 20'; Orbu 90+2' (pen.)	Report

Zimbru Stadium, Chișinău
Attendance: 4,000
Referee: Matej Jug (Slovenia)

Zestaponi won 3–2 on aggregate.

13 July 2011
20:00

Dinamo Zagreb (Croatia)	3–0	(Azerbaijan) Neftçi
Badelj 37'; Krstanović 46', 65' (pen.)	Report

Stadion Maksimir, Zagreb
Attendance: 33,266
Referee: Antony Gautier (France)
19 July 2011
18:00

Neftçi (Azerbaijan)	0–0	(Croatia) Dinamo Zagreb
	Report

Tofiq Bahramov Stadium, Baku
Attendance: 7,000
Referee: Hannes Kaasik (Estonia)

Dinamo Zagreb won 3–0 on aggregate.

12 July 2011
17:00

Pyunik (Armenia)	0–4	(Czech Republic) Viktoria Plzeň
	Report	Bakoš 7', 40' (pen.); Horváth 28' (pen.); Kolář 72'

Vazgen Sargsyan Republican Stadium, Yerevan
Attendance: 3,000
Referee: Michael Lerjéus (Sweden)
19 July 2011
20:15

Viktoria Plzeň (Czech Republic)	5–1	(Armenia) Pyunik
Bakoš 38', 42'; Kolář 45+1', 57'; Pilař 90+1'	Report	Malakyan 49'

Stadion města Plzně, Plzeň
Attendance: 5,400
Referee: Antti Munukka (Finland)

Viktoria Plzeň won 9–1 on aggregate.

13 July 2011
20:45

Partizan (Serbia)	4–0	(North Macedonia) Shkëndija
Vukić 48'; Edu 58'; Šćepović 74'; Berisha 76' (o.g.)	Report

Stadion FK Partizan, Belgrade
Attendance: 15,324
Referee: Artyom Kuchin (Kazakhstan)
19 July 2011
20:45

Shkëndija (North Macedonia)	0–1	(Serbia) Partizan
	Report	Jovančić 68'

Philip II Arena, Skopje (Note: Škendija played their home match at Philip II Arena, Skopje as their own Gradski stadion Tetovo did not meet the UEFA criteria.)
Attendance: 5,000
Referee: Ovidiu Hațegan (Romania)

Partizan won 5–0 on aggregate.

12 July 2011
19:30

Valletta (Malta)	2–3	(Lithuania) Ekranas
Mifsud 43'; William Barbosa 90+1' (pen.)	Report	Umeh 15'; Gleveckas 22'; Radavičius 41' (pen.)

Hibernians Ground, Paola
Attendance: 1,608
Referee: Pavle Radovanović (Montenegro)
19 July 2011
18:00

Ekranas (Lithuania)	1–0	(Malta) Valletta
Dedura 5'	Report

Aukštaitija Stadium, Panevėžys
Attendance: 3,000
Referee: Augustus Constantin (Romania)

Ekranas won 4–2 on aggregate.

13 July 2011
19:00

Malmö FF (Sweden)	2–0	(Faroe Islands) HB
Rexhepi 58'; Holm 77' (o.g.)	Report

Swedbank Stadion, Malmö
Attendance: 12,501
Referee: Marios Panayi (Cyprus)
19 July 2011
20:00

HB (Faroe Islands)	1–1	(Sweden) Malmö FF
Benjaminsen 70'	Report	Figueiredo 90+1'

Gundadalur, Tórshavn
Attendance: 688
Referee: Milenko Vukadinović (Serbia)

Malmö FF won 3–1 on aggregate.

12 July 2011
21:00

Shamrock Rovers (Republic of Ireland)	1–0	(Estonia) Flora
Turner 34'	Report

Tallaght Stadium, Tallaght
Attendance: 5,026
Referee: Jakob Kehlet (Denmark)
19 July 2011
17:45

Flora (Estonia)	0–0	(Republic of Ireland) Shamrock Rovers
	Report

A. Le Coq Arena, Tallinn
Attendance: 2,970
Referee: Dimitar Meckarovski (Macedonia)

Shamrock Rovers won 1–0 on aggregate.

13 July 2011
20:45

Rosenborg (Norway)	5–0	(Iceland) Breiðablik
Skjelbred 43'; Dorsin 48'; Henriksen 72'; Prica 76'; Olsen 86'	Report

Lerkendal Stadion, Trondheim
Attendance: 4,943
Referee: Nikolay Yordanov (Bulgaria)
20 July 2011
20:45

Breiðablik (Iceland)	2–0	(Norway) Rosenborg
Macallister 28'; Steindórsson 82'	Report

Kópavogsvöllur, Kópavogur
Attendance: 747
Referee: Christof Virant (Belgium)

Rosenborg won 5–2 on aggregate.

13 July 2011
19:30

Bangor City (Wales)	0–3	(Finland) HJK
	Report	Sadik 14', 55'; Sorsa 89'

Belle Vue, Rhyl (Note: Bangor City played their home match at Belle Vue, Rhyl as their own Farrar Road Stadium did not meet UEFA criteria.)
Attendance: 1,189
Referee: Anton Genov (Bulgaria)
19 July 2011
18:00

HJK (Finland)	10–0	(Wales) Bangor City
Ring 37'; Sadik 44'; Zeneli 47', 54'; Rafinha 52'; Pukki 64', 67'; Kastrati 66', 88'; Parikka 71'	Report

Sonera Stadium, Helsinki
Attendance: 5,944
Referee: Davit Kharitonashvili (Georgia)

HJK won 13–0 on aggregate.

13 July 2011
20:30

Skonto (Latvia)	0–1	(Poland) Wisła Kraków
	Report	Rode 40' (o.g.)

Skonto Stadium, Riga
Attendance: 5,200
Referee: Menashe Mashiah (Israel)
19 July 2011
20:30

Wisła Kraków (Poland)	2–0	(Latvia) Skonto
Małecki 51'; Iliev 64'	Report

Stadion Miejski im. Henryka Reymana, Kraków
Attendance: 19,300
Referee: Milorad Mažić (Serbia)

Wisła Kraków won 3–0 on aggregate.

13 July 2011
20:45

Linfield (Northern Ireland)	1–1	(Belarus) BATE Borisov
Fordyce 5'	Report	Bressan 37' (pen.)

Windsor Park, Belfast
Attendance: 1,212
Referee: Paweł Gil (Poland)
19 July 2011
18:00

BATE Borisov (Belarus)	2–0	(Northern Ireland) Linfield
Nyakhaychyk 58'; Pawlaw 61'	Report

City Stadium, Borisov
Attendance: 5,200
Referee: Libor Kovařík (Czech Republic)

BATE Borisov won 3–1 on aggregate.

== Third qualifying round ==
=== Seeding ===
Champions Route				League Route	
Group 1		Group 2		League Route	
Seeded	Unseeded	Seeded	Unseeded	Seeded	Unseeded
(Denmark) Copenhagen (Israel) Maccabi Haifa (Croatia) Dinamo Zagreb (Cyprus) APOEL (Poland) Wisła Kraków	(Bulgaria) Litex Lovech (Slovakia) Slovan Bratislava (Slovenia) Maribor (Finland) HJK (Republic of Ireland) Shamrock Rovers	(Scotland) Rangers (Belarus) BATE Borisov (Norway) Rosenborg (Serbia) Partizan (Austria) Sturm Graz	(Belgium) Genk (Czech Republic) Viktoria Plzeň (Lithuania) Ekranas (Georgia (country)) Zestaponi (Sweden) Malmö FF	(Portugal) Benfica (Ukraine) Dynamo Kyiv (Greece) Panathinaikos (Netherlands) Twente (Belgium) Standard Liège	(Russia) Rubin Kazan (Switzerland) Zürich (Denmark) Odense (Turkey) Trabzonspor (Romania) Vaslui

Notes

1. ^{†} Winners of the previous qualifying round whose identity was not known at the time of the draw.

=== Summary ===
Team 1	Agg.	Team 2	1st leg	2nd leg
Champions Route
Litex Lovech (Bulgaria)	2–5	(Poland) Wisła Kraków	1–2	1–3
Maccabi Haifa (Israel)	3–2	(Slovenia) Maribor	2–1	1–1
HJK (Finland)	1–3	(Croatia) Dinamo Zagreb	1–2	0–1
APOEL (Cyprus)	2–0	(Slovakia) Slovan Bratislava	0–0	2–0
Copenhagen (Denmark)	3–0	(Republic of Ireland) Shamrock Rovers	1–0	2–0
Genk (Belgium)	3–2	(Serbia) Partizan	2–1	1–1
Rosenborg (Norway)	2–4	(Czech Republic) Viktoria Plzeň	0–1	2–3
Zestaponi (Georgia (country))	1–2	(Austria) Sturm Graz	1–1	0–1
Ekranas (Lithuania)	1–3	(Belarus) BATE Borisov	0–0	1–3
Rangers (Scotland)	1–2	(Sweden) Malmö FF	0–1	1–1
League Route
Standard Liège (Belgium)	1–2	(Switzerland) Zürich	1–1	0–1
Twente (Netherlands)	2–0	(Romania) Vaslui	2–0	0–0
Benfica (Portugal)	3–1	(Turkey) Trabzonspor	2–0	1–1
Dynamo Kyiv (Ukraine)	1–4	(Russia) Rubin Kazan	0–2	1–2
Odense (Denmark)	5–4	(Greece) Panathinaikos	1–1	4–3

=== Champions Route matches ===
26 July 2011
19:30

Litex Lovech (Bulgaria)	1–2	(Poland) Wisła Kraków
Tom 45+1'	Report	Lamey 19'; Melikson 76'

Lovech Stadium, Lovech
Attendance: 6,800
Referee: Tommy Skjerven (Norway)
3 August 2011
20:30

Wisła Kraków (Poland)	3–1	(Bulgaria) Litex Lovech
Melikson 42', 56' (pen.); Wilk 84'	Report	Bodurov 68'

Stadion Miejski im. Henryka Reymana, Kraków
Attendance: 23,050
Referee: Fırat Aydınus (Turkey)

Wisła Kraków won 5–2 on aggregate.

27 July 2011
20:05

Maccabi Haifa (Israel)	2–1	(Slovenia) Maribor
Dvalishvili 8' (pen.); Yampolsky 70'	Report	Tavares 27'

Kiryat Eliezer Stadium, Haifa
Attendance: 9,600
Referee: Artur Soares Dias (Portugal)
3 August 2011
20:45

Maribor (Slovenia)	1–1	(Israel) Maccabi Haifa
Tavares 32'	Report	Vered 10'

Ljudski vrt, Maribor
Attendance: 12,000
Referee: Saïd Ennjimi (France)

Maccabi Haifa won 3–2 on aggregate.

27 July 2011
18:00

HJK (Finland)	1–2	(Croatia) Dinamo Zagreb
Ring 14'	Report	Rafinha 19' (o.g.); Sammir 77'

Sonera Stadium, Helsinki
Attendance: 10,153
Referee: Libor Kovařík (Czech Republic)
3 August 2011
20:45

Dinamo Zagreb (Croatia)	1–0	(Finland) HJK
Ibáñez 90'	Report

Stadion Maksimir, Zagreb
Attendance: 25,370
Referee: Kristinn Jakobsson (Iceland)

Dinamo Zagreb won 3–1 on aggregate.

26 July 2011
19:00

APOEL (Cyprus)	0–0	(Slovakia) Slovan Bratislava
	Report

GSP Stadium, Nicosia
Attendance: 14,553
Referee: Pol van Boekel (Netherlands)
3 August 2011
20:15

Slovan Bratislava (Slovakia)	0–2	(Cyprus) APOEL
	Report	Aílton 58'; Manduca 90+3'

Štadión Pasienky, Bratislava
Attendance: 9,348
Referee: Peter Sippel (Germany)

APOEL won 2–0 on aggregate.

27 July 2011
20:00

Copenhagen (Denmark)	1–0	(Republic of Ireland) Shamrock Rovers
Ottesen 4'	Report

Parken Stadium, Copenhagen
Attendance: 11,577
Referee: Pavle Radovanović (Montenegro)
2 August 2011
20:45

Shamrock Rovers (Republic of Ireland)	0–2	(Denmark) Copenhagen
	Report	N'Doye 42'; Bolaños 73'

Tallaght Stadium, Tallaght
Attendance: 5,901
Referee: Halis Özkahya (Turkey)

Copenhagen won 3–0 on aggregate.

26 July 2011
20:45

Genk (Belgium)	2–1	(Serbia) Partizan
Vossen 70' (pen.); Ogunjimi 90+2'	Report	Tomić 65'

Cristal Arena, Genk
Attendance: 12,735
Referee: Michael Koukoulakis (Greece)
3 August 2011
20:45

Partizan (Serbia)	1–1	(Belgium) Genk
Tomić 40'	Report	Vossen 58' (pen.)

Stadion FK Partizan, Belgrade
Attendance: 24,511
Referee: Jorge Sousa (Portugal)

Genk won 3–2 on aggregate.

27 July 2011
20:45

Rosenborg (Norway)	0–1	(Czech Republic) Viktoria Plzeň
	Report	Pilař 33'

Lerkendal Stadion, Trondheim
Attendance: 8,028
Referee: Matej Jug (Slovenia)
3 August 2011
20:15

Viktoria Plzeň (Czech Republic)	3–2	(Norway) Rosenborg
Bakoš 56'; Kolář 60'; Petržela 78'	Report	Lustig 44'; Prica 77'

Stadion města Plzně, Plzeň
Attendance: 5,124
Referee: Marijo Strahonja (Croatia)

Viktoria Plzeň won 4–2 on aggregate.

26 July 2011
18:00

Zestaponi (Georgia (country))	1–1	(Austria) Sturm Graz
Gelashvili 74'	Report	Wolf 78'

Boris Paichadze National Stadium, Tbilisi (Note: Zestaponi played their home match at Boris Paichadze National Stadium, Tbilisi as it has a greater capacity than their own David Abashidze Stadium.)
Attendance: 14,700
Referee: Anastassios Kakos (Greece)
3 August 2011
20:30

Sturm Graz (Austria)	1–0	(Georgia (country)) Zestaponi
Kienast 68'	Report

UPC-Arena, Graz
Attendance: 10,058
Referee: Antony Gautier (France)

Sturm Graz won 2–1 on aggregate.

26 July 2011
18:00

Ekranas (Lithuania)	0–0	(Belarus) BATE Borisov
	Report

Aukštaitija Stadium, Panevėžys
Attendance: 2,989
Referee: Deniz Aytekin (Germany)
2 August 2011
18:00

BATE Borisov (Belarus)	3–1	(Lithuania) Ekranas
Rodionov 18'; Bressan 35'; Gordeichuk 89'	Report	Velička 22'

City Stadium, Borisov
Attendance: 5,360
Referee: Hüseyin Göçek (Turkey)

BATE Borisov won 3–1 on aggregate.

26 July 2011
20:45

Rangers (Scotland)	0–1	(Sweden) Malmö FF
	Report	Larsson 18'

Ibrox Stadium, Glasgow
Attendance: 28,828
Referee: Antonio Mateu Lahoz (Spain)
3 August 2011
19:00

Malmö FF (Sweden)	1–1	(Scotland) Rangers
Hamad 80'	Report	Jelavić 23'

Swedbank Stadion, Malmö
Attendance: 19,084
Referee: Vladislav Bezborodov (Russia)

Malmö FF won 2–1 on aggregate.

=== League Route matches ===
27 July 2011
20:15

Standard Liège (Belgium)	1–1	(Switzerland) Zürich
González 90'	Report	Mehmedi 79'

Stade Maurice Dufrasne, Liège
Attendance: 13,727
Referee: Alon Yefet (Israel)
3 August 2011
20:15

Zürich (Switzerland)	1–0	(Belgium) Standard Liège
Mehmedi 58'	Report

Letzigrund, Zürich
Attendance: 10,500
Referee: Paolo Valeri (Italy)

Zürich won 2–1 on aggregate.

26 July 2011
20:45

Twente (Netherlands)	2–0	(Romania) Vaslui
Janko 34' (pen.), 57'	Report

GelreDome, Arnhem (Note: Twente played their home match at GelreDome, Arnhem due to the roof collapse at their own stadium De Grolsch Veste during expansion work on 7 July 2011.)
Attendance: 12,800
Referee: Ivan Bebek (Croatia)
3 August 2011
19:45

Vaslui (Romania)	0–0	(Netherlands) Twente
	Report

Stadionul Ceahlăul, Piatra Neamț (Note: Vaslui played their home match at Stadionul Ceahlăul, Piatra Neamț as their own Stadionul Municipal did not meet UEFA criteria.)
Attendance: 5,280
Referee: Fredy Fautrel (France)

Twente won 2–0 on aggregate.

27 July 2011
20:45

Benfica (Portugal)	2–0	(Turkey) Trabzonspor
Nolito 71'; Gaitán 88'	Report

Estádio da Luz, Lisbon
Attendance: 37,341
Referee: Stephan Studer (Switzerland)
3 August 2011
20:45

Trabzonspor (Turkey)	1–1	(Portugal) Benfica
Paulo Henrique 32'	Report	Nolito 19'

Atatürk Olympic Stadium, Istanbul (Note: Trabzonspor played their home match at Atatürk Olympic Stadium, Istanbul as their own Hüseyin Avni Aker Stadium needed maintenance work after the 2011 European Youth Summer Olympic Festival.)
Attendance: 32,060
Referee: Aleksandar Stavrev (Macedonia)

Benfica won 3–1 on aggregate.

26 July 2011
20:00

Dynamo Kyiv (Ukraine)	0–2	(Russia) Rubin Kazan
	Report	Kasaev 6'; Natcho 68' (pen.)

Valeriy Lobanovskyi Dynamo Stadium, Kyiv
Attendance: 16,430
Referee: David Fernández Borbalán (Spain)
3 August 2011
18:00

Rubin Kazan (Russia)	2–1	(Ukraine) Dynamo Kyiv
Dyadyun 19'; Medvedev 88'	Report	Husyev 90+2'

Central Stadium, Kazan
Attendance: 19,820
Referee: Eric Braamhaar (Netherlands)

Rubin Kazan won 4–1 on aggregate.

27 July 2011
20:00

Odense (Denmark)	1–1	(Greece) Panathinaikos
Reginiussen 90'	Report	Leto 47'

Fionia Park, Odense
Attendance: 10,055
Referee: Carlos Clos Gómez (Spain)
2 August 2011
20:45

Panathinaikos (Greece)	3–4	(Denmark) Odense
Boumsong 35'; Toché 50'; Petropoulos 90+5'	Report	Johansson 12'; Ruud 58'; Kadrii 80'; Andreasen 88'

Olympic Stadium, Athens
Attendance: 24,374
Referee: Andre Marriner (England)

Odense won 5–4 on aggregate.

== Play-off round ==
=== Seeding ===
Champions Route		League Route	
Seeded	Unseeded	Seeded	Unseeded
(Denmark) Copenhagen (Belarus) BATE Borisov (Israel) Maccabi Haifa (Croatia) Dinamo Zagreb (Cyprus) APOEL	(Poland) Wisła Kraków (Austria) Sturm Graz (Belgium) Genk (Czech Republic) Viktoria Plzeň (Sweden) Malmö FF	(Germany) Bayern Munich (England) Arsenal (France) Lyon (Portugal) Benfica (Spain) Villarreal	(Netherlands) Twente (Russia) Rubin Kazan (Italy) Udinese (Switzerland) Zürich (Denmark) Odense

=== Summary ===
Team 1	Agg.	Team 2	1st leg	2nd leg
Champions Route
Wisła Kraków (Poland)	2–3	(Cyprus) APOEL	1–0	1–3
Maccabi Haifa (Israel)	3–3 (1–4 p)	(Belgium) Genk	2–1	1–2 (a.e.t.)
Dinamo Zagreb (Croatia)	4–3	(Sweden) Malmö FF	4–1	0–2
Copenhagen (Denmark)	2–5	(Czech Republic) Viktoria Plzeň	1–3	1–2
BATE Borisov (Belarus)	3–1	(Austria) Sturm Graz	1–1	2–0
League Route
Odense (Denmark)	1–3	(Spain) Villarreal	1–0	0–3
Twente (Netherlands)	3–5	(Portugal) Benfica	2–2	1–3
Arsenal (England)	3–1	(Italy) Udinese	1–0	2–1
Bayern Munich (Germany)	3–0	(Switzerland) Zürich	2–0	1–0
Lyon (France)	4–2	(Russia) Rubin Kazan	3–1	1–1

=== Champions Route matches ===
17 August 2011
20:45

Wisła Kraków (Poland)	1–0	(Cyprus) APOEL
Małecki 71'	Report

Stadion Miejski im. Henryka Reymana, Kraków
Attendance: 22,545
Referee: Stéphane Lannoy (France)
23 August 2011
20:45

APOEL (Cyprus)	3–1	(Poland) Wisła Kraków
Pareiko 29' (o.g.); Aílton 54', 87'	Report	Wilk 71'

GSP Stadium, Nicosia
Attendance: 21,665
Referee: Viktor Kassai (Hungary)

APOEL won 3–2 on aggregate.

17 August 2011
20:45

Maccabi Haifa (Israel)	2–1	(Belgium) Genk
Amasha 8'; Dvalishvili 28'	Report	Barda 61'

Ramat Gan Stadium, Ramat Gan (Note: Maccabi Haifa played their home match at Ramat Gan Stadium, Ramat Gan as it has a greater capacity than their own Kiryat Eliezer Stadium.)
Attendance: 19,170
Referee: Wolfgang Stark (Germany)
23 August 2011
20:45

Genk (Belgium)	2–1 (a.e.t.)	(Israel) Maccabi Haifa
Vossen 35'; Buffel 41'	Report	Golasa 37'
Penalties
Vossen (penalty scored); Hubert (penalty scored); Tőzsér (penalty scored); Pudil (penalty scored)	4–1	(penalty missed) Dvalishvili; (penalty missed) Golasa; (penalty scored) Tawatha

Cristal Arena, Genk
Attendance: 13,753
Referee: Howard Webb (England)

3–3 on aggregate; Genk won 4–1 on penalties.

17 August 2011
20:45

Dinamo Zagreb (Croatia)	4–1	(Sweden) Malmö FF
Sammir 4', 60' (pen.); Rukavina 56'; Bećiraj 84'	Report	Mehmeti 17'

Stadion Maksimir, Zagreb
Attendance: 30,065
Referee: Pedro Proença (Portugal)
23 August 2011
20:45

Malmö FF (Sweden)	2–0	(Croatia) Dinamo Zagreb
Figueiredo 69'; Jansson 86'	Report

Swedbank Stadion, Malmö
Attendance: 15,331
Referee: Nicola Rizzoli (Italy)

Dinamo Zagreb won 4–3 on aggregate.

16 August 2011
20:45

Copenhagen (Denmark)	1–3	(Czech Republic) Viktoria Plzeň
Ottesen 69'	Report	Ottesen 52' (o.g.); Pilař 59'; Fillo 79'

Parken Stadium, Copenhagen
Attendance: 19,148
Referee: Martin Atkinson (England)
24 August 2011
20:45

Viktoria Plzeň (Czech Republic)	2–1	(Denmark) Copenhagen
Bakoš 67'; Ďuriš 90+3'	Report	Bolaños 32'

Synot Tip Aréna, Prague (Note: Viktoria Plzeň played their home match at Synot Tip Arena, Prague as it has a greater capacity than their own Stadion města Plzně.)
Attendance: 19,350
Referee: Carlos Velasco Carballo (Spain)

Viktoria Plzeň won 5–2 on aggregate.

16 August 2011
20:45

BATE Borisov (Belarus)	1–1	(Austria) Sturm Graz
Simić 59'	Report	Weber 12'

Dinamo Stadium, Minsk (Note: BATE Borisov played their home match at Dinamo Stadium, Minsk as their own City Stadium did not meet UEFA criteria.)
Attendance: 15,550
Referee: Svein Oddvar Moen (Norway)
24 August 2011
20:45

Sturm Graz (Austria)	0–2	(Belarus) BATE Borisov
	Report	A. Valadzko 36'; Simić 70'

UPC-Arena, Graz
Attendance: 14,528
Referee: Jonas Eriksson (Sweden)

BATE Borisov won 3–1 on aggregate.

=== League Route matches ===
17 August 2011
20:45

Odense (Denmark)	1–0	(Spain) Villarreal
Andreasen 84'	Report

TRE-FOR Park, Odense
Attendance: 13,002
Referee: Damir Skomina (Slovenia)
23 August 2011
20:45

Villarreal (Spain)	3–0	(Denmark) Odense
Rossi 50', 66'; Marchena 82'	Report

Estadio El Madrigal, Villarreal
Attendance: 18,304
Referee: Craig Thomson (Scotland)

Villarreal won 3–1 on aggregate.

16 August 2011
20:45

Twente (Netherlands)	2–2	(Portugal) Benfica
de Jong 6'; Ruiz 80'	Report	Cardozo 21'; Nolito 35'

De Grolsch Veste, Enschede
Attendance: 20,000
Referee: Alberto Undiano Mallenco (Spain)
24 August 2011
20:45

Benfica (Portugal)	3–1	(Netherlands) Twente
Witsel 46', 66'; Luisão 59'	Report	Ruiz 85'

Estádio da Luz, Lisbon
Attendance: 48,353
Referee: Felix Brych (Germany)

Benfica won 5–3 on aggregate.

16 August 2011
20:45

Arsenal (England)	1–0	(Italy) Udinese
Walcott 4'	Report

Emirates Stadium, London
Attendance: 58,159
Referee: Kevin Blom (Netherlands)
24 August 2011
20:45

Udinese (Italy)	1–2	(England) Arsenal
Di Natale 39'	Report	Van Persie 55'; Walcott 69'

Stadio Friuli, Udine
Attendance: 26,031
Referee: Olegário Benquerença (Portugal)

Arsenal won 3–1 on aggregate.

17 August 2011
20:45

Bayern Munich (Germany)	2–0	(Switzerland) Zürich
Schweinsteiger 8'; Robben 72'	Report

Allianz Arena, Munich
Attendance: 66,000
Referee: Aleksei Nikolaev (Russia)
23 August 2011
20:45

Zürich (Switzerland)	0–1	(Germany) Bayern Munich
	Report	Gómez 7'

Letzigrund, Zürich
Attendance: 23,600
Referee: Laurent Duhamel (France)

Bayern Munich won 3–0 on aggregate.

16 August 2011
20:45

Lyon (France)	3–1	(Russia) Rubin Kazan
Gomis 10'; Kvirkvelia 40' (o.g.); Briand 71'	Report	Dyadyun 3'

Stade de Gerland, Lyon
Attendance: 35,468
Referee: Gianluca Rocchi (Italy)
24 August 2011
18:00

Rubin Kazan (Russia)	1–1	(France) Lyon
Natcho 77'	Report	B. Koné 87'

Central Stadium, Kazan
Attendance: 20,620
Referee: Frank De Bleeckere (Belgium)

Lyon won 4–2 on aggregate.
