= 2011–12 UEFA Europa League group stage =

International football competition

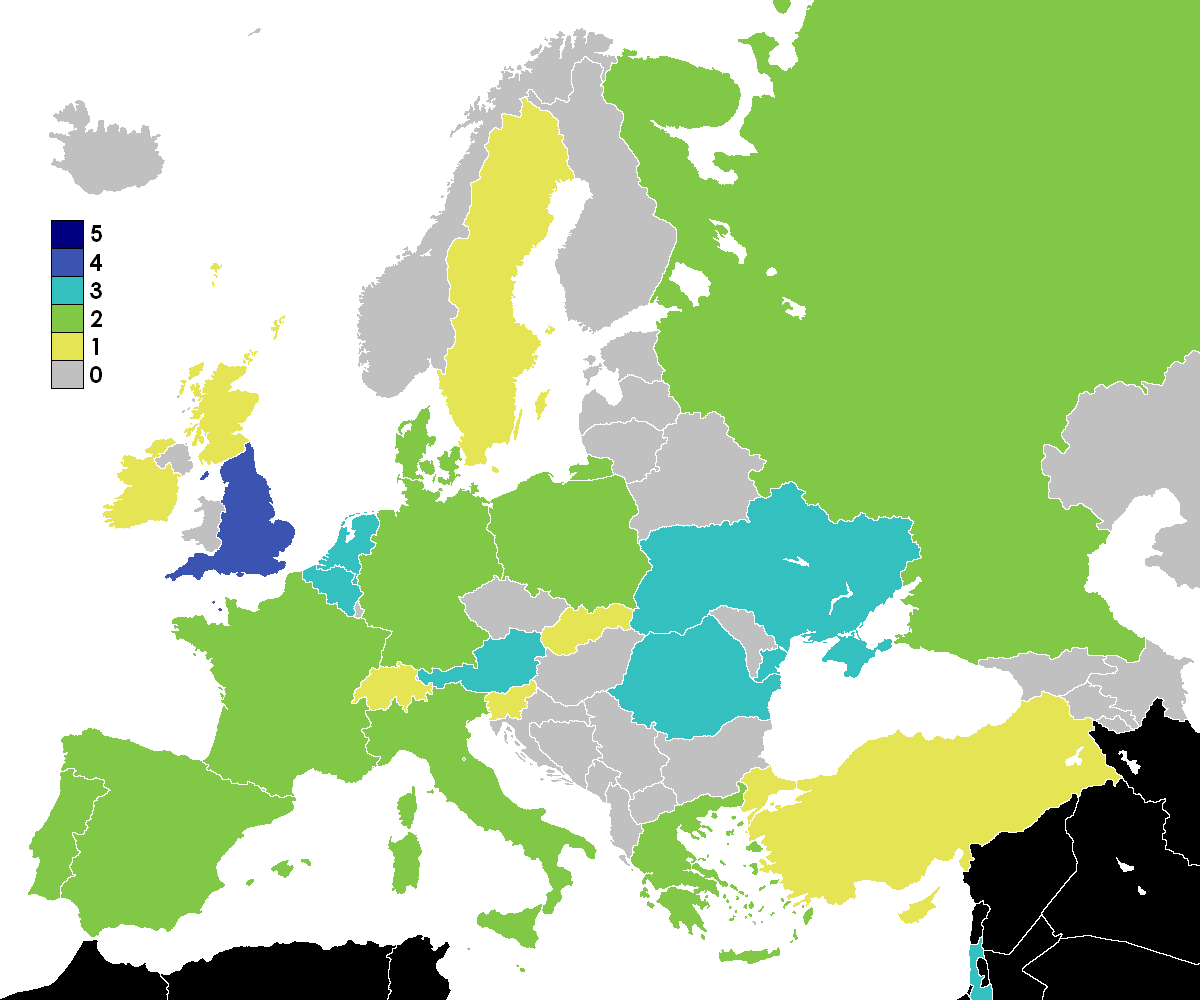
Teams per country in 2011–12 UEFA Europa League

This article details the 2011–12 UEFA Europa League group stage.

The group stage featured 48 teams: the 38 winners of the play-off round, and the 10 losing teams from the Champions League play-off round.

The teams were drawn into twelve groups of four, and played each other home-and-away in a round-robin format. The matchdays were 15 September, 29 September, 20 October, 3 November, 30 November–1 December, and 14–15 December 2011.

The top two teams in each group advanced to the round of 32, where they were joined by the eight third-placed teams from the Champions League group stage.

== Teams ==
The draw for the group stage was held at Grimaldi Forum, Monaco on 26 August 2011 at 13:00 CEST (UTC+02:00).

Teams were seeded into four pots based on their 2011 UEFA club coefficients. Pot 1 held teams ranked 18–49, Pot 2 held teams ranked 51–85, Pot 3 held teams ranked 89–154, while Pot 4 held teams ranked 155–302 and unranked teams.

Key to colours
Qualified for the round of 32

Pot 1
Team	Notes	Coeff.
(England) Tottenham Hotspur		78.157
(Netherlands) PSV Eindhoven		74.025
(Spain) Atlético Madrid		70.465
(Portugal) Sporting CP		68.319
(Portugal) Braga		62.319
(Germany) Schalke 04		61.887
(Ukraine) Dynamo Kyiv		60.776
(France) Paris Saint-Germain		51.735
(Denmark) Copenhagen		51.110
(Netherlands) AZ		43.025
(Belgium) Anderlecht		42.400
(Netherlands) Twente		41.025

Pot 2
Team	Notes	Coeff.
(England) Fulham		40.157
(Turkey) Beşiktaş		37.010
(Israel) Hapoel Tel Aviv		36.400
(Ukraine) Metalist Kharkiv		34.276
(Belgium) Standard Liège		32.400
(Russia) Rubin Kazan		31.941
(Belgium) Club Brugge		31.400
(Greece) AEK Athens		30.833
(Romania) Steaua București		29.164
(Italy) Udinese		27.110
(Spain) Athletic Bilbao		24.465
(Italy) Lazio		23.110

Pot 3
Team	Notes	Coeff.
(Austria) Red Bull Salzburg		22.140
(Israel) Maccabi Haifa		21.400
(Switzerland) Zürich		18.980
(Denmark) Odense		18.610
(Russia) Lokomotiv Moscow		18.441
(Greece) PAOK		17.333
(England) Birmingham City		17.157
(England) Stoke City		17.157
(France) Rennes		16.735
Austria Wien		16.640
(Romania) Rapid București		16.164
(Germany) Hannover 96		13.887

Pot 4
Team	Notes	Coeff.
(Ukraine) Vorskla Poltava		10.276
(Poland) Wisła Kraków		10.183
(Romania) Vaslui		10.164
(Switzerland) Sion (replaced by (Scotland) Celtic)		9.480
(Austria) Sturm Graz		8.640
(Israel) Maccabi Tel Aviv		5.900
(Slovakia) Slovan Bratislava		5.899
(Poland) Legia Warsaw		5.183
(Slovenia) Maribor		4.224
(Cyprus) AEK Larnaca		3.624
(Sweden) Malmö FF		2.825
(Republic of Ireland) Shamrock Rovers		2.741

Notes

1. ^{CL-CR} Losing teams from the Champions League play-off round (Champions Route)
2. ^{CL-LR} Losing teams from the Champions League play-off round (League Route)
3. ^{†} Celtic lodged protests over the eligibility of a number of the Sion players who participated in the two legs of the play-off round, which Sion won 3–1 aggregate (first leg: 0–0; second leg: 3–1). The UEFA Control and Disciplinary Body accepted the protests and decided to award both matches to Celtic by forfeit (3–0). As a consequence, Celtic qualified for the UEFA Europa League group stage after the draw, thereby taking Sion's place.

For the group stage draw, teams from the same national association could not be drawn against each other. Moreover, the draw was controlled for teams from the same association in order to split the teams evenly for maximum television coverage. For example, if there were two teams from the same association, each team was drawn into a different set of groups (A–F, G–L); if there were four teams from the same association, each team was drawn into a different subset of groups (A–C, D–F, G–I, J–L).

The fixtures were decided after the draw. On the first four matchdays, when matches were played only on Thursdays, six groups played their matches at 19:00 CET/CEST, while the other six groups played their matches at 21:05 CET/CEST, with the two sets of groups (A–F, G–L) alternating between each matchday. On the final two matchdays, when matches were played on both Wednesdays and Thursdays, the two sets of groups were divided into four smaller subsets (A–C, D–F, G–I, J–L), with each subset of groups playing on a different day and time. There are other restrictions, e.g., teams from the same city (e.g. Tottenham Hotspur and Fulham) do not play at home on the same matchday (UEFA tries to avoid teams from the same city play at home on the same day), and Russian teams do not play at home on the last matchday due to cold weather.

== Tie-breaking criteria ==
If two or more teams were equal on points on completion of the group matches, the following criteria would be applied to determine the rankings:

1. higher number of points obtained in the group matches played among the teams in question;
2. superior goal difference from the group matches played among the teams in question;
3. higher number of goals scored in the group matches played among the teams in question;
4. higher number of goals scored away from home in the group matches played among the teams in question;
5. If, after applying criteria 1) to 4) to several teams, two teams still have an equal ranking, the criteria 1) to 4) will be reapplied to determine the ranking of these teams;
6. superior goal difference from all group matches played;
7. higher number of goals scored from all group matches played;
8. higher number of coefficient points accumulated by the club in question, as well as its association, over the previous five seasons.

== Groups ==
Times up to 29 October 2011 (matchdays 1–3) are CEST (UTC+02:00), thereafter (matchdays 4–6) times are CET (UTC+01:00).

=== Group A ===
Pos	Team	Pld	W	D	L	GF	GA	GD	Pts	Qualification	PAOK	RK	TH	SR
1	(Greece) PAOK	6	3	3	0	10	6	+4	12	Advance to knockout phase	—	1–1	0–0	2–1
2	(Russia) Rubin Kazan	6	3	2	1	11	5	+6	11	Advance to knockout phase	2–2	—	1–0	4–1
3	(England) Tottenham Hotspur	6	3	1	2	9	4	+5	10		1–2	1–0	—	3–1
4	(Republic of Ireland) Shamrock Rovers	6	0	0	6	4	19	−15	0		1–3	0–3	0–4	—

Source: Soccerway
15 September 2011
19:00

PAOK (Greece)	0–0	(England) Tottenham Hotspur
	Report

Toumba Stadium, Thessaloniki
Attendance: 24,645
Referee: Milorad Mažić (Serbia)
15 September 2011
19:00

Shamrock Rovers (Republic of Ireland)	0–3	(Russia) Rubin Kazan
	Report	Martins 3'; Noboa 50'; Karadeniz 60'

Tallaght Stadium, Tallaght
Attendance: 6,920
Referee: Zsolt Szabó (Hungary)

29 September 2011
17:00

Rubin Kazan (Russia)	2–2	(Greece) PAOK
Natcho 52'; Dyadyun 66'	Report	Athanasiadis 23'; Fotakis 81'

Central Stadium, Kazan
Attendance: 14,350
Referee: Martin Hansson (Sweden)
29 September 2011
21:05

Tottenham Hotspur (England)	3–1	(Republic of Ireland) Shamrock Rovers
Pavlyuchenko 60'; Defoe 62'; Dos Santos 66'	Report	Rice 50'

White Hart Lane, London
Attendance: 24,782
Referee: Gediminas Mažeika (Lithuania)

20 October 2011
21:05

Tottenham Hotspur (England)	1–0	(Russia) Rubin Kazan
Pavlyuchenko 33'	Report

White Hart Lane, London
Attendance: 24,058
Referee: Jorge Sousa (Portugal)
20 October 2011
21:05

PAOK (Greece)	2–1	(Republic of Ireland) Shamrock Rovers
Lazăr 12'; Vieirinha 63'	Report	Sheppard 48'

Toumba Stadium, Thessaloniki
Attendance: 12,776
Referee: Tony Asumaa (Finland)

3 November 2011
18:00

Rubin Kazan (Russia)	1–0	(England) Tottenham Hotspur
Natcho 55'	Report

Central Stadium, Kazan
Attendance: 21,250
Referee: Florian Meyer (Germany)
3 November 2011
19:00

Shamrock Rovers (Republic of Ireland)	1–3	(Greece) PAOK
Dennehy 51'	Report	Salpingidis 7', 38'; Fotakis 35'

Tallaght Stadium, Tallaght
Attendance: 6,100
Referee: Aleksei Kulbakov (Belarus)

30 November 2011
18:00

Rubin Kazan (Russia)	4–1	(Republic of Ireland) Shamrock Rovers
Valdez 10', 51'; Natcho 36'; Martins 62'	Report	Oman 12'

Central Stadium, Kazan
Attendance: 15,740
Referee: Harald Lechner (Austria)
30 November 2011
21:05

Tottenham Hotspur (England)	1–2	(Greece) PAOK
Modrić 38' (pen.)	Report	Salpingidis 6'; Athanasiadis 13'

White Hart Lane, London
Attendance: 26,229
Referee: Bas Nijhuis (Netherlands)

15 December 2011
19:00

PAOK (Greece)	1–1	(Russia) Rubin Kazan
Vieirinha 16' (pen.)	Report	Valdez 48'

Toumba Stadium, Thessaloniki
Attendance: 15,625
Referee: Daniele Orsato (Italy)
15 December 2011
19:00

Shamrock Rovers (Republic of Ireland)	0–4	(England) Tottenham Hotspur
	Report	Pienaar 29'; Townsend 38'; Defoe 45'; Kane 90+1'

Tallaght Stadium, Tallaght
Attendance: 8,500
Referee: Stephan Studer (Switzerland)

=== Group B ===
Pos	Team	Pld	W	D	L	GF	GA	GD	Pts	Qualification	SL	HAN	COP	VP
1	(Belgium) Standard Liège	6	4	2	0	9	1	+8	14	Advance to knockout phase	—	2–0	3–0	0–0
2	(Germany) Hannover 96	6	3	2	1	9	7	+2	11	Advance to knockout phase	0–0	—	2–2	3–1
3	(Denmark) Copenhagen	6	1	2	3	5	9	−4	5		0–1	1–2	—	1–0
4	(Ukraine) Vorskla Poltava	6	0	2	4	4	10	−6	2		1–3	1–2	1–1	—

Source: Soccerway
15 September 2011
19:00

Hannover 96 (Germany)	0–0	(Belgium) Standard Liège
	Report

AWD-Arena, Hanover
Attendance: 42,500
Referee: Aleksandar Stavrev (Macedonia)
15 September 2011
19:00

Copenhagen (Denmark)	1–0	(Ukraine) Vorskla Poltava
Nordstrand 54' (pen.)	Report

Parken Stadium, Copenhagen
Attendance: 10,420
Referee: Stanislav Todorov (Bulgaria)

29 September 2011
21:05

Vorskla Poltava (Ukraine)	1–2	(Germany) Hannover 96
Kurylov 50'	Report	Abdellaoue 32'; Pander 44'

Butovsky Vorskla Stadium, Poltava
Attendance: 11,000
Referee: Kristinn Jakobsson (Iceland)
29 September 2011
21:05

Standard Liège (Belgium)	3–0	(Denmark) Copenhagen
Seijas 57'; Felipe 72'; Kanu 79'	Report

Stade Maurice Dufrasne, Liège
Attendance: 13,368
Referee: Anastassios Kakos (Greece)

20 October 2011
21:05

Standard Liège (Belgium)	0–0	(Ukraine) Vorskla Poltava
	Report

Stade Maurice Dufrasne, Liège
Attendance: 13,496
Referee: Simon Lee Evans (Wales)
20 October 2011
21:05

Hannover 96 (Germany)	2–2	(Denmark) Copenhagen
Pander 29'; Pinto 81'	Report	N'Doye 67'; Santin 89'

AWD-Arena, Hanover
Attendance: 43,100
Referee: Laurent Duhamel (France)

3 November 2011
19:00

Vorskla Poltava (Ukraine)	1–3	(Belgium) Standard Liège
Kurylov 5'	Report	Seijas 17'; Kanu 45+4'; Tchité 74'

Butovsky Vorskla Stadium, Poltava
Attendance: 8,000
Referee: Libor Kovařik (Czech Republic)
3 November 2011
19:00

Copenhagen (Denmark)	1–2	(Germany) Hannover 96
N'Doye 67'	Report	Schlaudraff 71'; Stindl 74'

Parken Stadium, Copenhagen
Attendance: 27,853
Referee: Eric Braamhaar (Netherlands)

30 November 2011
21:05

Standard Liège (Belgium)	2–0	(Germany) Hannover 96
Tchité 26'; Cyriac 59'	Report

Stade Maurice Dufrasne, Liège
Attendance: 18,104
Referee: Antonio Damato (Italy)
30 November 2011
21:05

Vorskla Poltava (Ukraine)	1–1	(Denmark) Copenhagen
N'Doye 31' (o.g.)	Report	N'Doye 37'

Butovsky Vorskla Stadium, Poltava
Attendance: 3,000
Referee: Aleksei Kulbakov (Belarus)

15 December 2011
19:00

Hannover 96 (Germany)	3–1	(Ukraine) Vorskla Poltava
Rausch 25'; Ya Konan 33'; Sobiech 78'	Report	Bezus 45+1' (pen.)

AWD-Arena, Hanover
Attendance: 42,000
Referee: Leontios Trattou (Cyprus)
15 December 2011
19:00

Copenhagen (Denmark)	0–1	(Belgium) Standard Liège
	Report	Batshuayi 31'

Parken Stadium, Copenhagen
Attendance: 9,722
Referee: Hüseyin Göçek (Turkey)

=== Group C ===
Pos	Team	Pld	W	D	L	GF	GA	GD	Pts	Qualification	PSV	LW	HTA	RB
1	(Netherlands) PSV Eindhoven	6	5	1	0	13	5	+8	16	Advance to knockout phase	—	1–0	3–3	2–1
2	(Poland) Legia Warsaw	6	3	0	3	7	9	−2	9	Advance to knockout phase	0–3	—	3–2	3–1
3	(Israel) Hapoel Tel Aviv	6	2	1	3	10	9	+1	7		0–1	2–0	—	0–1
4	(Romania) Rapid București	6	1	0	5	5	12	−7	3		1–3	0–1	1–3	—

Source: Soccerway
15 September 2011
19:00

Hapoel Tel Aviv (Israel)	0–1	(Romania) Rapid București
	Report	Herea 55'

Bloomfield Stadium, Tel Aviv
Attendance: 7,700
Referee: Hannes Kaasik (Estonia)
15 September 2011
19:00

PSV Eindhoven (Netherlands)	1–0	(Poland) Legia Warsaw
Mertens 21'	Report

Philips Stadion, Eindhoven
Attendance: 13,000
Referee: István Vad (Hungary)

29 September 2011
21:05

Legia Warsaw (Poland)	3–2	(Israel) Hapoel Tel Aviv
Ljuboja 67'; Komorowski 72' (pen.); Radović 89'	Report	Tamuz 34'; Lala 79'

Pepsi Arena, Warsaw
Attendance: 20,150
Referee: Saïd Ennjimi (France)
29 September 2011
21:05

Rapid București (Romania)	1–3	(Netherlands) PSV Eindhoven
Alexa 28'	Report	Bouma 43'; Toivonen 89'; Matavž 90+2'

Arena Națională, Bucharest (Note: Rapid București played their home matches at Arena Națională, Bucharest as they have left their own Stadionul Giuleşti-Valentin Stănescu prior to the season.)
Attendance: 21,320
Referee: Fredy Fautrel (France)

20 October 2011
21:05

Rapid București (Romania)	0–1	(Poland) Legia Warsaw
	Report	Radović 73'

Arena Națională, Bucharest
Attendance: 13,726
Referee: Fernando Teixeira Vitienes (Spain)
20 October 2011
21:05

Hapoel Tel Aviv (Israel)	0–1	(Netherlands) PSV Eindhoven
	Report	Wijnaldum 70' (pen.)

Bloomfield Stadium, Tel Aviv
Attendance: 9,468
Referee: Sergei Karasev (Russia)

3 November 2011
19:00

Legia Warsaw (Poland)	3–1	(Romania) Rapid București
Radović 54', 69'; Kucharczyk 90+4'	Report	Teixeira 65'

Pepsi Arena, Warsaw
Attendance: 30,786
Referee: Stefan Johannesson (Sweden)
3 November 2011
19:00

PSV Eindhoven (Netherlands)	3–3	(Israel) Hapoel Tel Aviv
Wijnaldum 12'; Toivonen 59'; Strootman 87'	Report	Damari 10'; Tamuz 33', 47'

Philips Stadion, Eindhoven
Attendance: 23,500
Referee: Stuart Attwell (England)

30 November 2011
21:05

Rapid București (Romania)	1–3	(Israel) Hapoel Tel Aviv
Deac 43' (pen.)	Report	Igiebor 12'; Tamuz 39' (pen.); Tuama 45+1'

Arena Națională, Bucharest
Attendance: 4,529
Referee: Zsolt Szabó (Hungary)
30 November 2011
21:05

Legia Warsaw (Poland)	0–3	(Netherlands) PSV Eindhoven
	Report	Żewłakow 32' (o.g.); Mertens 59' (pen.); Labyad 68'

Pepsi Arena, Warsaw
Attendance: 28,786
Referee: Fırat Aydınus (Turkey)

15 December 2011
19:00

Hapoel Tel Aviv (Israel)	2–0	(Poland) Legia Warsaw
Tuama 33'; Yadin 76'	Report

Bloomfield Stadium, Tel Aviv
Attendance: 5,500
Referee: Thomas Einwaller (Austria)
15 December 2011
19:00

PSV Eindhoven (Netherlands)	2–1	(Romania) Rapid București
Manolev 75'; Matavž 79'	Report	Pancu 90+2'

Philips Stadion, Eindhoven
Attendance: 27,000
Referee: Simon Lee Evans (Wales)

=== Group D ===
Pos	Team	Pld	W	D	L	GF	GA	GD	Pts	Qualification	SCP	LAZ	VAS	ZÜR
1	(Portugal) Sporting CP	6	4	0	2	8	4	+4	12	Advance to knockout phase	—	2–1	2–0	2–0
2	(Italy) Lazio	6	2	3	1	7	5	+2	9	Advance to knockout phase	2–0	—	2–2	1–0
3	(Romania) Vaslui	6	1	3	2	5	8	−3	6		1–0	0–0	—	2–2
4	(Switzerland) Zürich	6	1	2	3	5	8	−3	5		0–2	1–1	2–0	—

Source: Soccerway
15 September 2011
19:00

Zürich (Switzerland)	0–2	(Portugal) Sporting CP
	Report	Insúa 4'; Van Wolfswinkel 21'

Letzigrund, Zürich
Attendance: 10,400
Referee: Pol van Boekel (Netherlands)
15 September 2011
19:00

Lazio (Italy)	2–2	(Romania) Vaslui
Cissé 35' (pen.); Sculli 71'	Report	Wesley 59', 63' (pen.)

Stadio Olimpico, Rome
Attendance: 13,913
Referee: Eric Braamhaar (Netherlands)

29 September 2011
21:05

Vaslui (Romania)	2–2	(Switzerland) Zürich
Wesley 62' (pen.); Temwanjera 77'	Report	Alphonse 32'; Mehmedi 79'

Stadionul Ceahlăul, Piatra Neamț (Note: Vaslui played their home matches at Stadionul Ceahlăul, Piatra Neamț as their own Stadionul Municipal did not meet UEFA criteria.)
Attendance: 3,000
Referee: Menashe Masiah (Israel)
29 September 2011
21:05

Sporting CP (Portugal)	2–1	(Italy) Lazio
Van Wolfswinkel 21'; Insúa 45+2'	Report	Klose 40'

Estádio José Alvalade, Lisbon
Attendance: 33,725
Referee: Serge Gumienny (Belgium)

20 October 2011
21:05

Sporting CP (Portugal)	2–0	(Romania) Vaslui
Evaldo 43'; Fernández 70'	Report

Estádio José Alvalade, Lisbon
Attendance: 28,106
Referee: Clément Turpin (France)
20 October 2011
21:05

Zürich (Switzerland)	1–1	(Italy) Lazio
Nikçi 23'	Report	Sculli 22'

Letzigrund, Zürich
Attendance: 10,800
Referee: Pawel Gil (Poland)

3 November 2011
19:00

Vaslui (Romania)	1–0	(Portugal) Sporting CP
Zmeu 30'	Report

Stadionul Ceahlăul, Piatra Neamț
Attendance: 4,000
Referee: Kristinn Jakobsson (Iceland)
3 November 2011
19:00

Lazio (Italy)	1–0	(Switzerland) Zürich
Brocchi 62'	Report

Stadio Olimpico, Rome
Attendance: 13,414
Referee: Michael Koukoulakis (Greece)

1 December 2011
21:05

Sporting CP (Portugal)	2–0	(Switzerland) Zürich
Van Wolfswinkel 15'; Bojinov 58'	Report

Estádio José Alvalade, Lisbon
Attendance: 25,309
Referee: Peter Rasmussen (Denmark)
1 December 2011
21:05

Vaslui (Romania)	0–0	(Italy) Lazio
	Report

Stadionul Ceahlăul, Piatra Neamț
Attendance: 7,000
Referee: Milorad Mažić (Serbia)

14 December 2011
19:00

Zürich (Switzerland)	2–0	(Romania) Vaslui
Margairaz 69'; Buff 90'	Report

Letzigrund, Zürich
Attendance: 6,200
Referee: Maksim Layushkin (Russia)
14 December 2011
19:00

Lazio (Italy)	2–0	(Portugal) Sporting CP
Kozák 42'; Sculli 55'	Report

Stadio Olimpico, Rome
Attendance: 8,295
Referee: Mike Dean (England)

=== Group E ===
Pos	Team	Pld	W	D	L	GF	GA	GD	Pts	Qualification	BEŞ	SC	DK	MTA
1	(Turkey) Beşiktaş	6	4	0	2	13	7	+6	12	Advance to knockout phase	—	3–1	1–0	5–1
2	(England) Stoke City	6	3	2	1	10	7	+3	11	Advance to knockout phase	2–1	—	1–1	3–0
3	(Ukraine) Dynamo Kyiv	6	1	4	1	7	7	0	7		1–0	1–1	—	3–3
4	(Israel) Maccabi Tel Aviv	6	0	2	4	8	17	−9	2		2–3	1–2	1–1	—

Source: Soccerway
15 September 2011
19:00

Dynamo Kyiv (Ukraine)	1–1	(England) Stoke City
Vukojević 90+1'	Report	Jerome 55'

Valeriy Lobanovskyi Dynamo Stadium, Kyiv
Attendance: 14,500
Referee: Ovidiu Haţegan (Romania)
15 September 2011
19:00

Beşiktaş (Turkey)	5–1	(Israel) Maccabi Tel Aviv
Almeida 3', 28'; Aurélio 51'; Korkmaz 53'; Edu 88'	Report	Kahat 48'

BJK İnönü Stadium, Istanbul
Attendance: 17,936
Referee: Vladislav Bezborodov (Russia)

29 September 2011
21:05

Maccabi Tel Aviv (Israel)	1–1	(Ukraine) Dynamo Kyiv
Micha 44'	Report	Ideye 9'

Bloomfield Stadium, Tel Aviv
Attendance: 13,835
Referee: Marijo Strahonja (Croatia)
29 September 2011
21:05

Stoke City (England)	2–1	(Turkey) Beşiktaş
Crouch 15'; Walters 78' (pen.)	Report	Hilbert 14'

Britannia Stadium, Stoke-on-Trent
Attendance: 23,551
Referee: Antony Gautier (France)

20 October 2011
21:05

Stoke City (England)	3–0	(Israel) Maccabi Tel Aviv
Jones 12'; Jerome 24'; Shotton 32'	Report

Britannia Stadium, Stoke-on-Trent
Attendance: 22,756
Referee: Anastassios Kakos (Greece)
20 October 2011
21:05

Dynamo Kyiv (Ukraine)	1–0	(Turkey) Beşiktaş
Harmash 90+3'	Report

Valeriy Lobanovskyi Dynamo Stadium, Kyiv
Attendance: 13,500
Referee: Milorad Mažić (Serbia)

3 November 2011
19:00

Maccabi Tel Aviv (Israel)	1–2	(England) Stoke City
Colautti 90+1'	Report	Whitehead 51'; Crouch 64'

Bloomfield Stadium, Tel Aviv
Attendance: 10,368
Referee: Duarte Gomes (Portugal)
3 November 2011
19:00

Beşiktaş (Turkey)	1–0	(Ukraine) Dynamo Kyiv
Korkmaz 67'	Report

BJK İnönü Stadium, Istanbul
Attendance: 24,183
Referee: Tommy Skjerven (Norway)

1 December 2011
21:05

Stoke City (England)	1–1	(Ukraine) Dynamo Kyiv
Jones 81'	Report	Upson 27' (o.g.)

Britannia Stadium, Stoke-on-Trent
Attendance: 23,774
Referee: Florian Meyer (Germany)
1 December 2011
21:05

Maccabi Tel Aviv (Israel)	2–3	(Turkey) Beşiktaş
Yeini 59'; Lugasi 70'	Report	Quaresma 45+1', 90+2'; Toraman 47'

Bloomfield Stadium, Tel Aviv
Attendance: 9,420
Referee: Serge Gumienny (Belgium)

14 December 2011
19:00

Dynamo Kyiv (Ukraine)	3–3	(Israel) Maccabi Tel Aviv
Yeini 12' (o.g.); Husyev 17', 80'	Report	Vered 49'; Atar 62'; Dabbur 75'

Valeriy Lobanovskyi Dynamo Stadium, Kyiv
Attendance: 3,850
Referee: Daniel Stålhammar (Sweden)
14 December 2011
19:00

Beşiktaş (Turkey)	3–1	(England) Stoke City
Fernandes 59' (pen.); Pektemek 74'; Edu 82'	Report	Fuller 29'

BJK İnönü Stadium, Istanbul
Attendance: 26,118
Referee: Marcin Borski (Poland)

=== Group F ===
Pos	Team	Pld	W	D	L	GF	GA	GD	Pts	Qualification	AB	RBS	PSG	SB
1	(Spain) Athletic Bilbao	6	4	1	1	11	8	+3	13	Advance to knockout phase	—	2–2	2–0	2–1
2	(Austria) Red Bull Salzburg	6	3	1	2	11	8	+3	10 (Note: Tied on head-to-head points (3) and head-to-head goal difference (0). Head-to-head away goals: Red Bull Salzburg 1, Paris Saint-Germain 0.)	Advance to knockout phase	0–1	—	2–0	3–0
3	(France) Paris Saint-Germain	6	3	1	2	8	7	+1	10		4–2	3–1	—	1–0
4	(Slovakia) Slovan Bratislava	6	0	1	5	4	11	−7	1		1–2	2–3	0–0	—

Source: Soccerway
Notes:
15 September 2011
19:00

Slovan Bratislava (Slovakia)	1–2	(Spain) Athletic Bilbao
Guédé 34'	Report	Susaeta 13'; Muniain 40'

Štadión Pasienky, Bratislava
Attendance: 6,328
Referee: Alon Yefet (Israel)
15 September 2011
19:00

Paris Saint-Germain (France)	3–1	(Austria) Red Bull Salzburg
Nenê 35' (pen.); Bodmer 44'; Ménez 67'	Report	Sekagya 87'

Parc des Princes, Paris
Attendance: 23,039
Referee: Luca Banti (Italy)

29 September 2011
21:05

Red Bull Salzburg (Austria)	3–0	(Slovakia) Slovan Bratislava
Leonardo 60'; Zárate 76'; Švento 90+5'	Report

Red Bull Arena, Wals-Siezenheim
Attendance: 7,500
Referee: Alexandru Dan Tudor (Romania)
29 September 2011
21:05

Athletic Bilbao (Spain)	2–0	(France) Paris Saint-Germain
Gabilondo 20'; Susaeta 45'	Report

San Mamés Stadium, Bilbao
Attendance: 23,487
Referee: Bas Nijhuis (Netherlands)

20 October 2011
21:05

Athletic Bilbao (Spain)	2–2	(Austria) Red Bull Salzburg
Llorente 69' (pen.), 75' (pen.)	Report	Wallner 30'; Leonardo 36'

San Mamés Stadium, Bilbao
Attendance: 22,566
Referee: Ivan Bebek (Croatia)
20 October 2011
21:05

Slovan Bratislava (Slovakia)	0–0	(France) Paris Saint-Germain
	Report

Štadión Pasienky, Bratislava
Attendance: 7,238
Referee: Lee Probert (England)

3 November 2011
19:00

Red Bull Salzburg (Austria)	0–1	(Spain) Athletic Bilbao
	Report	Herrera 37'

Red Bull Arena, Wals-Siezenheim
Attendance: 10,350
Referee: Stanislav Todorov (Bulgaria)
3 November 2011
19:00

Paris Saint-Germain (France)	1–0	(Slovakia) Slovan Bratislava
Pastore 63'	Report

Parc des Princes, Paris
Attendance: 32,046
Referee: Mark Courtney (Northern Ireland)

1 December 2011
21:05

Athletic Bilbao (Spain)	2–1	(Slovakia) Slovan Bratislava
De Marcos 15'; Susaeta 75'	Report	Šebo 39'

San Mamés Stadium, Bilbao
Attendance: 28,314
Referee: Hannes Kaasik (Estonia)
1 December 2011
21:05

Red Bull Salzburg (Austria)	2–0	(France) Paris Saint-Germain
Jantscher 20'; Švento 90+4'	Report

Red Bull Arena, Wals-Siezenheim
Attendance: 8,304
Referee: Liran Liany (Israel)

14 December 2011
19:00

Slovan Bratislava (Slovakia)	2–3	(Austria) Red Bull Salzburg
Lačný 3', 6'	Report	Jantscher 19' (pen.); Leonardo 24'; Had 52' (o.g.)

Štadión Pasienky, Bratislava
Attendance: 4,586
Referee: Stefan Johannesson (Sweden)
14 December 2011
19:00

Paris Saint-Germain (France)	4–2	(Spain) Athletic Bilbao
Pastore 21'; Bodmer 41'; Pérez 85' (o.g.); Hoarau 90' (pen.)	Report	Aurtenetxe 3'; López 55'

Parc des Princes, Paris
Attendance: 37,114
Referee: Matej Jug (Slovenia)

=== Group G ===
Pos	Team	Pld	W	D	L	GF	GA	GD	Pts	Qualification	MK	AZ	AW	MFF
1	(Ukraine) Metalist Kharkiv	6	4	2	0	15	6	+9	14	Advance to knockout phase	—	1–1	4–1	3–1
2	(Netherlands) AZ	6	1	5	0	10	7	+3	8 (Note: Tied on head-to-head results. Overall goal difference was used as the tiebreaker.)	Advance to knockout phase	1–1	—	2–2	4–1
3	Austria Wien	6	2	2	2	10	11	−1	8		1–2	2–2	—	2–0
4	(Sweden) Malmö FF	6	0	1	5	4	15	−11	1		1–4	0–0	1–2	—

Source: Soccerway
Notes:
15 September 2011
21:05

AZ (Netherlands)	4–1	(Sweden) Malmö FF
Altidore 21'; Elm 32' (pen.); Maher 39'; Holman 49'	Report	Larsson 72' (pen.)

AFAS Stadion, Alkmaar
Attendance: 11,905
Referee: Ivan Bebek (Croatia)
15 September 2011
21:05

Austria Wien	1–2	(Ukraine) Metalist Kharkiv
Jun 7'	Report	Gueye 56'; Xavier 79' (pen.)

Generali Arena, Vienna
Attendance: 9,100
Referee: Mike Dean (England)

29 September 2011
19:00

Metalist Kharkiv (Ukraine)	1–1	(Netherlands) AZ
Taison 76'	Report	Altidore 26'

Metalist Stadium, Kharkiv
Attendance: 37,122
Referee: Marcin Borski (Poland)
29 September 2011
19:00

Malmö FF (Sweden)	1–2	Austria Wien
Ranégie 82'	Report	Barazite 17'; A. Grünwald 36'

Swedbank Stadion, Malmö
Attendance: 10,802
Referee: Pawel Gil (Poland)

20 October 2011
19:00

Malmö FF (Sweden)	1–4	(Ukraine) Metalist Kharkiv
Hamad 22'	Report	Cristaldo 32'; Fininho 45+1'; Edmar 57'; Devich 73'

Swedbank Stadion, Malmö
Attendance: 8,466
Referee: Fırat Aydınus (Turkey)
20 October 2011
19:00

AZ (Netherlands)	2–2	Austria Wien
Hlinka 80' (o.g.); Wernbloom 83'	Report	Marcellis 19' (o.g.); Gorgon 29'

AFAS Stadion, Alkmaar
Attendance: 15,321
Referee: Alexandru Dan Tudor (Romania)

3 November 2011
21:05

Metalist Kharkiv (Ukraine)	3–1	(Sweden) Malmö FF
Taison 46', 56'; Fininho 90'	Report	Ranégie 66'

Metalist Stadium, Kharkiv
Attendance: 25,883
Referee: Matej Jug (Slovenia)
3 November 2011
21:05

Austria Wien	2–2	(Netherlands) AZ
Ortlechner 58'; Barazite 61'	Report	Elm 19' (pen.); Wernbloom 44'

Generali Arena, Vienna
Attendance: 10,450
Referee: Tony Chapron (France)

30 November 2011
19:00

Malmö FF (Sweden)	0–0	(Netherlands) AZ
	Report

Swedbank Stadion, Malmö
Attendance: 7,632
Referee: Mark Courtney (Northern Ireland)
30 November 2011
19:00

Metalist Kharkiv (Ukraine)	4–1	Austria Wien
Devich 16'; Edmar 40'; Gueye 60'; Sosa 90'	Report	Mader 19'

Metalist Stadium, Kharkiv
Attendance: 25,810
Referee: Cristian Balaj (Romania)

15 December 2011
21:05

AZ (Netherlands)	1–1	(Ukraine) Metalist Kharkiv
Maher 37'	Report	Devich 37'

AFAS Stadion, Alkmaar
Attendance: 13,268
Referee: Carlos Clos Gómez (Spain)
15 December 2011
21:05

Austria Wien	2–0	(Sweden) Malmö FF
Liendl 62'; Barazite 80'	Report

Generali Arena, Vienna
Attendance: 9,350
Referee: Antti Munukka (Finland)

=== Group H ===
Pos	Team	Pld	W	D	L	GF	GA	GD	Pts	Qualification	CB	BRA	BC	MAR
1	(Belgium) Club Brugge	6	3	2	1	12	9	+3	11 (Note: Head-to-head points: Club Brugge 4, Braga 1.)	Advance to knockout phase	—	1–1	1–2	2–0
2	(Portugal) Braga	6	3	2	1	12	6	+6	11	Advance to knockout phase	1–2	—	1–0	5–1
3	(England) Birmingham City	6	3	1	2	8	8	0	10		2–2	1–3	—	1–0
4	(Slovenia) Maribor	6	0	1	5	6	15	−9	1		3–4	1–1	1–2	—

Source: Soccerway
Notes:
15 September 2011
21:05

Club Brugge (Belgium)	2–0	(Slovenia) Maribor
Odjidja 7'; Dirar 24'	Report

Jan Breydel Stadium, Bruges
Attendance: 16,668
Referee: Fırat Aydınus (Turkey)
15 September 2011
21:05

Birmingham City (England)	1–3	(Portugal) Braga
King 71'	Report	Barbosa 6', 88'; Lima 59'

St Andrew's, Birmingham
Attendance: 21,747
Referee: Deniz Aytekin (Germany)

29 September 2011
19:00

Braga (Portugal)	1–2	(Belgium) Club Brugge
Barbosa 53'	Report	Akpala 71'; Donk 90+1'

Estádio Municipal de Braga, Braga
Attendance: 9,145
Referee: Tommy Skjerven (Norway)
29 September 2011
19:00

Maribor (Slovenia)	1–2	(England) Birmingham City
Volaš 29'	Report	Burke 64'; Elliott 79'

Ljudski vrt, Maribor
Attendance: 10,000
Referee: Tom Harald Hagen (Norway)

20 October 2011
19:00

Maribor (Slovenia)	1–1	(Portugal) Braga
Ibraimi 14'	Report	Echiéjilé 44'

Ljudski vrt, Maribor
Attendance: 8,500
Referee: Stephan Studer (Switzerland)
20 October 2011
19:00

Club Brugge (Belgium)	1–2	(England) Birmingham City
Akpala 3'	Report	Murphy 26'; Wood 90+10'

Jan Breydel Stadium, Bruges
Attendance: 23,936
Referee: Daniele Orsato (Italy)

3 November 2011
21:05

Braga (Portugal)	5–1	(Slovenia) Maribor
Lima 4'; Alan 7'; Echiéjilé 38'; Paulo Vinícius 85'; Mérida 90+1'	Report	Volaš 62'

Estádio Municipal de Braga, Braga
Attendance: 7,185
Referee: Leontios Trattou (Cyprus)
3 November 2011
21:05

Birmingham City (England)	2–2	(Belgium) Club Brugge
Beausejour 55'; King 74' (pen.)	Report	Meunier 39'; Akpala 44'

St Andrew's, Birmingham
Attendance: 26,849
Referee: Marcin Borski (Poland)

30 November 2011
19:00

Maribor (Slovenia)	3–4	(Belgium) Club Brugge
Volaš 11', 68'; Donk 51' (o.g.)	Report	Dirar 74'; Volaš 77' (o.g.); Akpala 82'; Donk 90'

Ljudski vrt, Maribor
Attendance: 8,000
Referee: Libor Kovařik (Czech Republic)
30 November 2011
19:00

Braga (Portugal)	1–0	(England) Birmingham City
Viana 51'	Report

Estádio Municipal de Braga, Braga
Attendance: 9,957
Referee: Markus Strömbergsson (Sweden)

15 December 2011
21:05

Club Brugge (Belgium)	1–1	(Portugal) Braga
Vleminckx 50'	Report	Ewerton 65'

Jan Breydel Stadium, Bruges
Attendance: 18,383
Referee: Aleksandar Stavrev (Macedonia)
15 December 2011
21:05

Birmingham City (England)	1–0	(Slovenia) Maribor
Rooney 24'	Report

St Andrew's, Birmingham
Attendance: 21,436
Referee: Sascha Kever (Switzerland)

=== Group I ===
Pos	Team	Pld	W	D	L	GF	GA	GD	Pts	Qualification	AM	UDI	CEL	REN
1	(Spain) Atlético Madrid	6	4	1	1	11	4	+7	13	Advance to knockout phase	—	4–0	2–0	3–1
2	(Italy) Udinese	6	2	3	1	6	7	−1	9	Advance to knockout phase	2–0	—	1–1	2–1
3	(Scotland) Celtic	6	1	3	2	6	7	−1	6		0–1	1–1	—	3–1
4	(France) Rennes	6	0	3	3	5	10	−5	3		1–1	0–0	1–1	—

Source: Soccerway
15 September 2011
21:05

Udinese (Italy)	2–1	(France) Rennes
Di Natale 39'; Armero 83'	Report	Hadji 18'

Stadio Friuli, Udine
Attendance: 8,383
Referee: Cristian Balaj (Romania)
15 September 2011
21:05

Atlético Madrid (Spain)	2–0	(Scotland) Celtic
Falcao 3'; Diego 68'	Report

Vicente Calderón, Madrid
Attendance: 24,868
Referee: Peter Rasmussen (Denmark)

29 September 2011
19:00

Celtic (Scotland)	1–1	(Italy) Udinese
Ki 3' (pen.)	Report	Abdi 88' (pen.)

Celtic Park, Glasgow
Attendance: 28,476
Referee: Bülent Yıldırım (Turkey)
29 September 2011
19:00

Rennes (France)	1–1	(Spain) Atlético Madrid
Montaño 55'	Report	Juanfran 86'

Stade de la Route de Lorient, Rennes
Attendance: 24,299
Referee: Hüseyin Göçek (Turkey)

20 October 2011
19:00

Rennes (France)	1–1	(Scotland) Celtic
Cha 31' (o.g.)	Report	Ledley 70'

Stade de la Route de Lorient, Rennes
Attendance: 21,825
Referee: Robert Małek (Poland)
20 October 2011
19:00

Udinese (Italy)	2–0	(Spain) Atlético Madrid
Benatia 88'; Floro Flores 90+4'	Report

Stadio Friuli, Udine
Attendance: 10,026
Referee: Alon Yefet (Israel)

3 November 2011
21:05

Celtic (Scotland)	3–1	(France) Rennes
Stokes 30', 43'; Hooper 82'	Report	Mangane 2'

Celtic Park, Glasgow
Attendance: 28,578
Referee: Bruno Paixão (Portugal)
3 November 2011
21:05

Atlético Madrid (Spain)	4–0	(Italy) Udinese
Adrián 7', 12'; Diego 37'; Falcao 67'	Report

Vicente Calderón, Madrid
Attendance: 18,300
Referee: István Vad (Hungary)

30 November 2011
19:00

Rennes (France)	0–0	(Italy) Udinese
	Report

Stade de la Route de Lorient, Rennes
Attendance: 17,428
Referee: Sergei Karasev (Russia)
30 November 2011
19:00

Celtic (Scotland)	0–1	(Spain) Atlético Madrid
	Report	Turan 30'

Celtic Park, Glasgow
Attendance: 33,257
Referee: Eric Braamhaar (Netherlands)

15 December 2011
21:05

Udinese (Italy)	1–1	(Scotland) Celtic
Di Natale 45+1'	Report	Hooper 29'

Stadio Friuli, Udine
Attendance: 8,644
Referee: Michael Koukoulakis (Greece)
15 December 2011
21:05

Atlético Madrid (Spain)	3–1	(France) Rennes
Falcao 38' (pen.); Domínguez 42'; Turan 79'	Report	Mandjeck 86'

Vicente Calderón, Madrid
Attendance: 13,154
Referee: Kristinn Jakobsson (Iceland)

=== Group J ===
Pos	Team	Pld	W	D	L	GF	GA	GD	Pts	Qualification	SCH	SB	MHA	AEK
1	(Germany) Schalke 04	6	4	2	0	13	2	+11	14	Advance to knockout phase	—	2–1	3–1	0–0
2	(Romania) Steaua București	6	2	2	2	9	11	−2	8	Advance to knockout phase	0–0	—	4–2	3–1
3	(Israel) Maccabi Haifa	6	2	0	4	10	12	−2	6		0–3	5–0	—	1–0
4	(Cyprus) AEK Larnaca	6	1	2	3	4	11	−7	5		0–5	1–1	2–1	—

Source: Soccerway
15 September 2011
21:05

Maccabi Haifa (Israel)	1–0	(Cyprus) AEK Larnaca
Ghadir 54'	Report

Kiryat Eliezer Stadium, Haifa
Attendance: 9,250
Referee: Libor Kovařik (Czech Republic)
15 September 2011
21:05

Steaua București (Romania)	0–0	(Germany) Schalke 04
	Report

Stadionul Dr. Constantin Rădulescu, Cluj-Napoca (Note: Steaua București played their home match against Schalke 04 at Stadionul Dr. Constantin Rădulescu, Cluj-Napoca as the UEFA Euro 2012 qualifying Group D match between Romania and France left the grass at the Arena Națională in an unplayable state.)
Attendance: 12,390
Referee: Michael Koukoulakis (Greece)

29 September 2011
19:00

Schalke 04 (Germany)	3–1	(Israel) Maccabi Haifa
Fuchs 8', 66'; Jurado 82'	Report	Vered 35'

Veltins-Arena, Gelsenkirchen
Attendance: 49,070
Referee: Jorge Sousa (Portugal)
29 September 2011
19:00

AEK Larnaca (Cyprus)	1–1	(Romania) Steaua București
Mrdaković 59'	Report	M. Costea 65'

GSP Stadium, Nicosia (Note: AEK Larnaca played their home matches at GSP Stadium, Nicosia as their own GSZ Stadium did not meet UEFA criteria.)
Attendance: 4,058
Referee: Mark Courtney (Northern Ireland)

20 October 2011
19:00

AEK Larnaca (Cyprus)	0–5	(Germany) Schalke 04
	Report	Holtby 22'; Huntelaar 34', 88'; Höwedes 40'; Draxler 87'

GSP Stadium, Nicosia
Attendance: 5,344
Referee: Luca Banti (Italy)
20 October 2011
19:00

Maccabi Haifa (Israel)	5–0	(Romania) Steaua București
Amashe 10', 20'; Katan 38' (pen.); Twatiha 72'; Vered 79'	Report

Kiryat Eliezer Stadium, Haifa
Attendance: 12,000
Referee: Daniel Stålhammar (Sweden)

3 November 2011
21:05

Schalke 04 (Germany)	0–0	(Cyprus) AEK Larnaca
	Report

Veltins-Arena, Gelsenkirchen
Attendance: 52,077
Referee: Hannes Kaasik (Estonia)
3 November 2011
21:05

Steaua București (Romania)	4–2	(Israel) Maccabi Haifa
Leandro Tatu 13'; F. Costea 28'; Tănase 64', 84'	Report	Meshumar 36'; Katan 40'

Arena Națională, Bucharest
Attendance: 31,233
Referee: Kevin Blom (Netherlands)

1 December 2011
19:00

AEK Larnaca (Cyprus)	2–1	(Israel) Maccabi Haifa
García 14'; Pintado 51'	Report	Buljat 75'

GSP Stadium, Nicosia
Attendance: 3,132
Referee: Andre Marriner (England)
1 December 2011
19:00

Schalke 04 (Germany)	2–1	(Romania) Steaua București
Papadopoulos 25'; Raúl 57'	Report	Rusescu 33'

Veltins-Arena, Gelsenkirchen
Attendance: 53,123
Referee: Antonio Mateu Lahoz (Spain)

14 December 2011
21:05

Maccabi Haifa (Israel)	0–3	(Germany) Schalke 04
	Report	Buljat 7' (o.g.); Marica 84'; Wiegel 90+2'

Kiryat Eliezer Stadium, Haifa
Attendance: 11,234
Referee: Fredy Fautrel (France)
14 December 2011
21:05

Steaua București (Romania)	3–1	(Cyprus) AEK Larnaca
Rusescu 55' (pen.); Nikolić 70', 85'	Report	Pintado 61'

Arena Națională, Bucharest
Attendance: 50,051
Referee: Saïd Ennjimi (France)

=== Group K ===
Pos	Team	Pld	W	D	L	GF	GA	GD	Pts	Qualification	TWE	WK	FUL	OB
1	(Netherlands) Twente	6	4	1	1	14	7	+7	13	Advance to knockout phase	—	4–1	1–0	3–2
2	(Poland) Wisła Kraków	6	3	0	3	8	13	−5	9	Advance to knockout phase	2–1	—	1–0	1–3
3	(England) Fulham	6	2	2	2	9	6	+3	8		1–1	4–1	—	2–2
4	(Denmark) Odense	6	1	1	4	9	14	−5	4		1–4	1–2	0–2	—

Source: Soccerway
15 September 2011
21:05

Wisła Kraków (Poland)	1–3	(Denmark) Odense
Kirm 54'	Report	Johansson 35'; Utaka 80'; Falk 90+2'

Stadion im. Henryka Reymana, Kraków
Attendance: 12,920
Referee: Sascha Kever (Switzerland)
15 September 2011
21:05

Fulham (England)	1–1	(Netherlands) Twente
Johnson 19'	Report	Schwarzer 40' (o.g.)

Craven Cottage, London
Attendance: 14,110
Referee: Antonio Damato (Italy)

29 September 2011
19:00

Twente (Netherlands)	4–1	(Poland) Wisła Kraków
De Jong 32'; Janko 45+1', 57'; Janssen 80'	Report	Biton 9'

De Grolsch Veste, Enschede
Attendance: 20,000
Referee: Duarte Gomes (Portugal)
29 September 2011
19:00

Odense (Denmark)	0–2	(England) Fulham
	Report	Johnson 36', 88'

TRE-FOR Park, Odense
Attendance: 7,969
Referee: Maksim Layushkin (Russia)

20 October 2011
19:00

Odense (Denmark)	1–4	(Netherlands) Twente
Fall 71'	Report	Brama 13'; Bajrami 31'; Chadli 65'; De Jong 82'

TRE-FOR Park, Odense
Attendance: 8,036
Referee: David Fernández Borbalán (Spain)
20 October 2011
19:00

Wisła Kraków (Poland)	1–0	(England) Fulham
Biton 60'	Report

Stadion im. Henryka Reymana, Kraków
Attendance: 16,377
Referee: Martin Hansson (Sweden)

3 November 2011
21:05

Twente (Netherlands)	3–2	(Denmark) Odense
Høegh 35' (o.g.); Landzaat 37'; Fer 82'	Report	Fall 11', 62'

De Grolsch Veste, Enschede
Attendance: 20,000
Referee: Ovidiu Alin Hategan (Romania)
3 November 2011
21:05

Fulham (England)	4–1	(Poland) Wisła Kraków
Duff 5'; Johnson 30', 57'; Sidwell 79'	Report	Kirm 9'

Craven Cottage, London
Attendance: 20,319
Referee: Halis Özkahya (Turkey)

1 December 2011
19:00

Odense (Denmark)	1–2	(Poland) Wisła Kraków
Falk 51'	Report	Biton 20'; Małecki 28'

TRE-FOR Park, Odense
Attendance: 5,824
Referee: Laurent Duhamel (France)
1 December 2011
19:00

Twente (Netherlands)	1–0	(England) Fulham
Janko 89'	Report

De Grolsch Veste, Enschede
Attendance: 25,250
Referee: Marijo Strahonja (Croatia)

14 December 2011
21:05

Wisła Kraków (Poland)	2–1	(Netherlands) Twente
Garguła 12'; Genkov 47'	Report	De Jong 39'

Stadion im. Henryka Reymana, Kraków
Attendance: 15,500
Referee: Vladislav Bezborodov (Russia)
14 December 2011
21:05

Fulham (England)	2–2	(Denmark) Odense
Dempsey 27'; Frei 32'	Report	Andreasen 64'; Fall 90+3'

Craven Cottage, London
Attendance: 15,757
Referee: Alon Yefet (Israel)

=== Group L ===
Pos	Team	Pld	W	D	L	GF	GA	GD	Pts	Qualification	AND	LM	AEK	SG
1	(Belgium) Anderlecht	6	6	0	0	18	5	+13	18	Advance to knockout phase	—	5–3	4–1	3–0
2	(Russia) Lokomotiv Moscow	6	4	0	2	14	11	+3	12	Advance to knockout phase	0–2	—	3–1	3–1
3	(Greece) AEK Athens	6	1	0	5	8	15	−7	3 (Note: Tied on head-to-head points (3). Head-to-head goal difference: AEK Athens +1, Sturm Graz −1.)		1–2	1–3	—	1–2
4	(Austria) Sturm Graz	6	1	0	5	5	14	−9	3		0–2	1–2	1–3	—

Source: Soccerway
Notes:
15 September 2011
21:05

Sturm Graz (Austria)	1–2	(Russia) Lokomotiv Moscow
Szabics 14'	Report	Obinna 28'; Sychev 29'

UPC-Arena, Graz
Attendance: 13,356
Referee: Bruno Paixão (Portugal)
15 September 2011
21:05

Anderlecht (Belgium)	4–1	(Greece) AEK Athens
Suárez 16', 40', 84'; Jovanović 33'	Report	Leonardo 36'

Constant Vanden Stock Stadium, Brussels
Attendance: 11,480
Referee: Carlos Clos Gómez (Spain)

29 September 2011
18:00

Lokomotiv Moscow (Russia)	0–2	(Belgium) Anderlecht
	Report	Suárez 11'; Mbokani 71'

Lokomotiv Stadium, Moscow
Attendance: 11,485
Referee: Matej Jug (Slovenia)
29 September 2011
19:00

AEK Athens (Greece)	1–2	(Austria) Sturm Graz
Standfest 50' (o.g.)	Report	Burgstaller 87'; Haas 90+2'

Olympic Stadium, Athens
Attendance: 10,074
Referee: Lee Probert (England)

20 October 2011
18:00

Lokomotiv Moscow (Russia)	3–1	(Greece) AEK Athens
Sychev 47', 71' (pen.); Caicedo 90+3'	Report	Sialmas 89'

Lokomotiv Stadium, Moscow
Attendance: 8,279
Referee: Pol van Boekel (Netherlands)
20 October 2011
19:00

Sturm Graz (Austria)	0–2	(Belgium) Anderlecht
	Report	Gillet 66'; Suárez 75'

UPC-Arena, Graz
Attendance: 14,297
Referee: Alan Kelly (Republic of Ireland)

3 November 2011
21:05

AEK Athens (Greece)	1–3	(Russia) Lokomotiv Moscow
Leonardo 60' (pen.)	Report	Glushakov 50'; Maicon 72'; Ignatyev 80'

Olympic Stadium, Athens
Attendance: 4,042
Referee: William Collum (Scotland)
3 November 2011
21:05

Anderlecht (Belgium)	3–0	(Austria) Sturm Graz
Gillet 23'; Suárez 74'; De Sutter 81'	Report

Constant Vanden Stock Stadium, Brussels
Attendance: 15,460
Referee: Menashe Masiah (Israel)

1 December 2011
18:00

Lokomotiv Moscow (Russia)	3–1	(Austria) Sturm Graz
Maicon 62'; Sychev 72' (pen.); Glushakov 89'	Report	Kainz 63'

Lokomotiv Stadium, Moscow
Attendance: 12,423
Referee: Deniz Aytekin (Germany)
1 December 2011
19:00

AEK Athens (Greece)	1–2	(Belgium) Anderlecht
Sialmas 19'	Report	Gillet 4', 36'

Olympic Stadium, Athens
Attendance: 3,703
Referee: Robert Małek (Poland)

14 December 2011
21:05

Sturm Graz (Austria)	1–3	(Greece) AEK Athens
Kainz 59'	Report	Manolas 10'; Burns 43'; Klonaridis 77'

UPC-Arena, Graz
Attendance: 13,681
Referee: Alexandru Deaconu (Romania)
14 December 2011
21:05

Anderlecht (Belgium)	5–3	(Russia) Lokomotiv Moscow
Kljestan 33'; Fernando 39'; Wasilewski 57'; Suárez 61'; Gillet 78'	Report	Ignatyev 21'; Sychev 69' (pen.), 89'

Constant Vanden Stock Stadium, Brussels
Attendance: 14,069
Referee: Ivan Bebek (Croatia)
