= Seidu Yahaya =

Ghanaian footballer

Seydou Yahaya
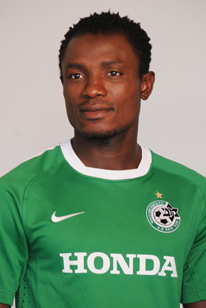

Personal information
- Date of birth: 31 December 1989 (age 36)
- Place of birth: Accra, Ghana
- Height: 1.75 m (5 ft 9 in)
- Position: Midfielder

Youth career
- 2004–2006: Tema Youth

Senior career*
Years	Team	Apps	(Gls)
2006–2009	Tema Youth		
2008–2009	→ Anagennisi Karditsa (loan)	29	(0)
2009–2010	AEK Athens	3	(0)
2010–2012	Maccabi Haifa	47	(1)
2012–2015	Astra Giurgiu	66	(4)
2015–2017	Sheriff Tiraspol	42	(0)
2018	Dinamo Minsk	29	(0)
2019	Al-Fayha	3	(0)
2019	Dinamo Minsk	23	(1)
2020	Liepāja	23	(1)
- * Club domestic league appearances and goals as of 31 December 2020

Seidu Yahaya (born 31 December 1989) is a former Ghanaian footballer.

== Career ==
Yahaya started his professional career at Tema Youth in 2006. In 2008, Yahaya was transferred from Tema Youth to Anagennisi Karditsa on a loan deal, where he featured 29 times for the Canaries all making it in the starting eleven. From Anagennisi he made it to AEK Athens where he featured five times. Although he made some good appearances in the start of the 2009–2010 season, including his first Europa League game against Everton at the Goodison Park in England, Yahaya fell out of favor with Dušan Bajević quickly and was never featured again.

He was signed by Maccabi Haifa in 2010. In the first season with Maccabi Haifa Yahaya won the championship and lost in the cup final. Maccabi Haifa exercised Yahaya's contract option for the next three years where he left his previous number 18 shirt for his favorite number 6 shirt.

On the 20 June 2012, he signed a three-year contract with Liga I club Astra Giurgiu, which ended On 30 June 2015. He joined Sheriff Tiraspol on 14 June 2015 through where he won the Moldovan Supercup in his first game against Milsami Orhei.

== Honours ==
Maccabi Haifa

- Israeli Premier League (1): 2010–11
- Israel State Cup Runner-up (2): 2010–11, 2011–12

Astra Giurgiu

- Cupa României (1): 2013–14
- Supercupa României (1): 2014
- Liga I Runner-up (1): 2013–14

Sheriff Tiraspol

- Moldovan National Division (2): 2015–16, 2016–17
- Moldovan Cup (1): 2016–17
- Moldovan Super Cup (1): 2015
