= 2011–12 Israel State Cup =

Tournament details
- Country: Israel

Final positions
- Champions: Hapoel Tel Aviv (15th title)
- Runners-up: Maccabi Haifa

The 2011–12 Israel State Cup (Hebrew: גביע המדינה, Gvia HaMedina) was the 73rd season of Israel's nationwide football cup competition and the 58th after the Israeli Declaration of Independence. It began on 2 September 2011, while the final was held in Ramat Gan Stadium on 15 May 2012.

The competition was won by Hapoel Tel Aviv, who had beaten Maccabi Haifa 2–1 in the final. With this victory, Hapoel Tel Aviv won the cup for the third year in a row, equalizing its own record of consecutive titles, set between 1937 and 1939.

By winning, Hapoel Tel Aviv qualified for the 2012–13 UEFA Europa League, entering in the Play-off round.

== Calendar ==
Round	Date
First Round	September 2 to 13, 2011
Second Round	September 27 to October 5, 2011
Third Round	October 11, 2011
Fourth Round	October 25, 2011
Fifth Round	October 4 and 5, 2011
Sixth Round	November 11 and 12, 2011
Seventh Round	January 3 and 4, 2012
Eighth Round	February 7 and 8, 2012
Round of 16	March 20 and 21, 2012
Quarter-finals	April 9 and 10, 2012
Semi-finals	May 2, 2012
Final	May 15, 2012

== Results ==
=== Seventh Round ===
The 16 winners from the previous round of the competition join the 16 Liga Leumit clubs in this stage of the competition. These matches were played on 3 and 4 January 2012.

Home team	Score	Away team
Maccabi Ironi Amishav Petah Tikva	0−1	Hapoel Afula
Hapoel Azor	1−3	Beitar Tel Aviv Ramla
Maccabi Yavne	5−0	Beitar Haifa
Bnei Maghar	1−2 (a.e.t.)	F.C. Kafr Qasim
F.C. Givat Olga	6−3	Maccabi Kiryat Gat
Hapoel Bnei Lod	4−1	Ironi Tiberias
Hapoel Tzafririm Holon	0−10	Hapoel Nazareth Illit
Hapoel Ramat Gan	1−0	Maccabi Ironi Netivot
Maccabi Herzliya	8−1	Ironi Nesher
Maccabi Umm al-Fahm	2−1	Ironi Bat Yam
Beitar Kfar Saba Shlomi	1−1 (a.e.t., p. 5–3)	Maccabi Sektzia Ma'alot-Tarshiha
Hapoel Ra'anana	0−1	Sektzia Nes Tziona
Maccabi Ahi Nazareth	0−2	Hapoel Jerusalem
Hapoel Herzliya	0−2	Hapoel Asi Gilboa
Hakoah Amidar Ramat Gan	1−2	Maccabi Be'er Sheva
Hapoel Kfar Saba	2−0	Hapoel Ashkelon

=== Eighth Round ===
The 16 winners from the previous round of the competition join the 16 clubs from the Israeli Premier League in this stage of the competition. These matches were played on 7 and 8 February 2012.

Home team	Score	Away team
Maccabi Umm al-Fahm	3−2 (a.e.t.)	Hapoel Afula
Maccabi Be'er Sheva	1−2	Maccabi Haifa
Beitar Tel Aviv Ramla	2−2 (a.e.t., p. 2–4)	Hapoel Kfar Saba
F.C. Givat Olga	0−1	Maccabi Herzliya
Hapoel Tel Aviv	3−0	Maccabi Yavne
Maccabi Petah Tikva	2−0	Bnei Sakhnin
Hapoel Petah Tikva	0−3	F.C. Ashdod
Sektzia Nes Tziona	1−2 (a.e.t.)	Maccabi Netanya
Ironi Nir Ramat HaSharon	3−1	Hapoel Acre
Hapoel Asi Gilboa	1−2	Hapoel Nazareth Illit
Hapoel Jerusalem	1−0 (a.e.t.)	Maccabi Tel Aviv
Hapoel Rishon LeZion	0−2	Beitar Kfar Saba Shlomi
Hapoel Ramat Gan	3−2	F.C. Kafr Qasim
Hapoel Haifa	0−1	Ironi Kiryat Shmona
Hapoel Bnei Lod	0−0 (a.e.t., p. 4–3)	Beitar Jerusalem
Hapoel Be'er Sheva	3−3 (a.e.t., p. 4–1)	Bnei Yehuda Tel Aviv

=== Round of 16 ===
The 16 winners of the previous round entered this stage of the competition. These matches took place on 20 and 21 March 2012.

Home team	Score	Away team
Hapoel Jerusalem	0−1 (a.e.t.)	Maccabi Petah Tikva
Ironi Kiryat Shmona	1−2	Maccabi Netanya
Beitar Kfar Saba Shlomi	0−1	Ironi Nir Ramat HaSharon
Hapoel Bnei Lod	1−3 (a.e.t.)	Hapoel Tel Aviv
F.C. Ashdod	3−1	Maccabi Umm al-Fahm
Hapoel Kfar Saba	0−0 (a.e.t., p. 3–4)	Maccabi Haifa
Hapoel Nazareth Illit	4−2	Hapoel Ramat Gan
Hapoel Be'er Sheva	1−1 (a.e.t., p. 4–5)	Maccabi Herzliya

=== Quarter-finals ===
The eight winners of the previous round entered this stage of the competition. These matches took place on 9 and 10 April 2012.

Home team	Score	Away team
Ironi Nir Ramat HaSharon	1−0	Maccabi Herzliya
Maccabi Petah Tikva	1−3	F.C. Ashdod
Maccabi Netanya	0−1	Hapoel Tel Aviv
Maccabi Haifa	2−0	Hapoel Nazareth Illit

=== Semi-finals ===
The four winners of the previous round entered this stage of the competition. These matches took place on 2 May 2012, in Ramat Gan Stadium.

Home team	Score	Away team
Maccabi Haifa	2–1	F.C. Ashdod
Hapoel Tel Aviv	3–0 (a.e.t.)	Ironi Nir Ramat HaSharon

=== Final ===
May 15, 2012
20:00 UTC+3

Hapoel Tel Aviv	2 – 1	Maccabi Haifa
Oremuš 58'; Igiebor 90+2'	Report	Yampolsky 62'

Ramat Gan Stadium, Ramat Gan
Attendance: 37,000
Referee: Alon Yefet
