= Itzik Cohen (footballer, born 1983) =

Israeli international footballer

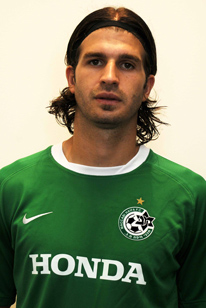

Personal information
- Date of birth: 22 April 1983 (age 43)
- Place of birth: Acre, Israel
- Height: 1.85 m (6 ft 1 in)
- Position: Centre back

Senior career*
Years	Team	Apps	(Gls)
2001–2002	Maccabi Haifa	1	(0)
2002–2003	Hapoel Haifa	0	(0)
2003–2006	Hapoel Ironi Acre	32	(1)
2006	Hapoel Ironi Kiryat Shmona	1	(0)
2006–2007	Hakoah Amidar Ramat Gan	14	(0)
2007–2009	Hapoel Petah Tikva	49	(2)
2009–2011	Hapoel Ironi Acre	53	(3)
2011–2014	Maccabi Haifa	9	(1)
2012–2013	→ Hapoel Ironi Kiryat Shmona (loan)	16	(0)
2014–2016	Bnei Sakhnin	33	(2)
2016–2017	Hapoel Kfar Saba	32	(1)
2017–2018	Hapoel Petah Tikva	31	(0)

International career
2011	Israel	3	(0)
- * Club domestic league appearances and goals

Itzik Cohen (Hebrew: איציק כהן; born 22 April 1983) is an Israeli former footballer who played as a central defender.

== Career ==
Cohen has played for Maccabi Haifa, Hapoel Haifa, Hapoel Ironi Acre, Hapoel Ironi Kiryat Shmona, Hakoah Amidar Ramat Gan, Hapoel Petah Tikva, Bnei Sakhnin and Hapoel Kfar Saba.

He made his international debut in 2011.
