= Weaam Amasha =

Druze footballer

Wiyam Amasha
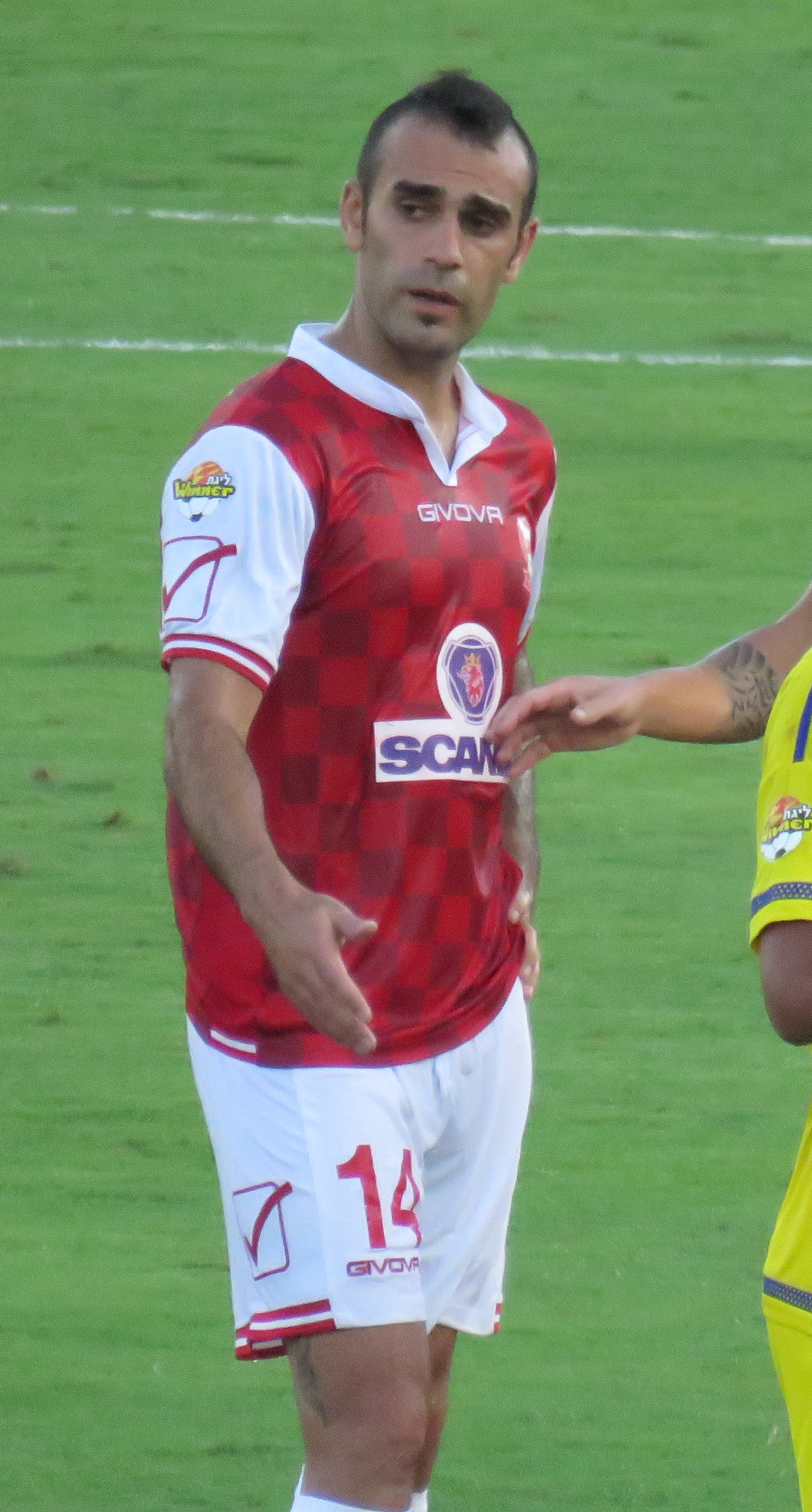
- Wiam Amasha playing for Bnei Sakhnin in 2015

Personal information
- Full name: Weeam Amasha
- Date of birth: 8 August 1985 (age 41)
- Place of birth: Buq'ata, Golan Heights
- Height: 1.78 m (5 ft 10 in)
- Position: Striker

Team information
- Current team: F.C. Tira

Youth career
- Ironi Kiryat Shmona

Senior career*
Years	Team	Apps	(Gls)
2006–2011	Ironi Kiryat Shmona	65	(28)
2008–2009	→ Maccabi Ahi Nazareth (loan)	25	(6)
2011–2015	Maccabi Haifa	58	(25)
2014	→ Ironi Kiryat Shmona (loan)	13	(5)
2015–2016	Bnei Sakhnin	29	(9)
2016	Hapoel Ra'anana	0	(0)
2016	Hapoel Tel Aviv	2	(0)
2017–2018	Hapoel Hadera	9	(1)
2018	Bnei HaGolan VeHaGalil	3	(1)
2018–2019	F.C. Daburiyya	22	(17)
2019–2022	F.C. Tira	46	(19)
2022–	Bnei HaGolan VeHaGalil	34	(6)

International career
2003–2004	Israel U19	14	(2)
2005–2006	Israel U21	5	(0)
- * Club domestic league appearances and goals as of 1 June 2024

Weeam Amasha (Arabic: وئام عماشة, Hebrew: וויאם עמאשה; born 8 August 1985) is a Golan Heights-born Druze footballer.

== Early life ==
Amasha is a Druze from the village Buq'ata, Golan Heights. He holds no official citizenship but rather an Israeli Travel Document. With special permission from FIFA, Amasha played for Israel despite having received interest from the Syrian Football Association. When Amasha goes to a match abroad he is required to get a visa for any country since he doesn't hold a real passport.

== Club career ==
On 7 June 20, 2011 Amasha signed a four-year contract with Israeli defending champion Maccabi Haifa. Amasha made his debut on 2011–12 UEFA Champions League Second qualifying round, 13 July 2011, against Borac Banja Luka and scored three goals.

== International career ==
After catching the eye of Israel national team manager, Luis Fernández, Amasha was thought to be on his way to making a full national team appearance. Due to changes in FIFA statutes, Amasha can not represent the full national team without acquiring an Israeli passport. On 30 November 2011, FIFA granted Amasha special permission to play without a passport for the Israel national team.

== Honours ==
=== Ironi Kiryat Shmona ===
- Toto Cup (1):
  - 2010–11
- Israel State Cup (1):
  - 2014

=== Maccabi Haifa ===
- Israel State Cup
  - Runner-up (1): 2012
- Israeli Premier League
  - Runner-up (1): 2012–13
