= Dela Yampolsky =

Israeli footballer

Dele Yampolsky דלה ימפולסקי
Personal information
- Full name: Bamidele Yampolsky
- Date of birth: 28 July 1988 (age 38)
- Place of birth: Nigeria
- Height: 1.71 m (5 ft 7 1/2 in)
- Position: Attacking midfielder

Team information
- Current team: Hapoel Safed

Youth career
- Gadna Tel Aviv Yehuda
- 2003–2004: Bnei Yehuda Tel Aviv
- 2004–2006: Maccabi Netnaya

Senior career*
Years	Team	Apps	(Gls)
2005–2011	Maccabi Netanya	127	(13)
2011–2013	Maccabi Haifa	34	(4)
2013–2014	Hapoel Haifa	18	(0)
2014–2015	Hapoel Ra'anana	11	(0)
2015–2016	Hapoel Bnei Lod	14	(1)
2016–2017	Sektzia Ness Ziona	22	(3)
2018	Hapoel Baqa al-Gharbiyye	15	(4)
2018	Kafr Qasim	4	(0)
2018–2019	Hapoel Baqa al-Gharbiyye	2	(0)
2019	Shimshon Kafr Qasim	10	(0)
2019–2020	Maccabi Sha'arayim	23	(4)
2020–2021	Ironi Kuseife	15	(0)
2021	F.C. Tira	9	(1)
2021–2022	Hapoel Ashkelon	6	(0)
2022–	Hapoel Safed	0	(0)

International career
2005	Israel U-17	6	(0)
2006	Israel U18	3	(0)
2005–2007	Israel U19	11	(3)
2008–2010	Israel U21	2	(0)
- * Club domestic league appearances and goals as of 1 June 2022

Dele Yampolsky (Hebrew: דלה ימפולסקי; born 28 July 1988), also known as Bamidele Ogunsanya, is a footballer who plays as a midfielder for Maccabi Sha'arayim. Born in Nigeria, he has represented Israel at youth level.

His first name "Bamidele" means "Follow me home" in Yoruba. His unique surname is the result of being adopted by his stepfather who is Israeli of Russian descent and moved him and his mother from Nigeria to Israel after getting married.

== Biography ==
In 2004 Yampolsky moved to Maccabi Netanya there he played for two years in the youth team until he got promoted to the senior side there he became a permanent part of the team.

On June 20, 2011, after 7 years in Netanya he moved to Maccabi Haifa for a fee of $440,000. He rejected a move to TSV 1860 München and Hapoel Tel Aviv in order to get a chance to play in the Champions League with Haifa.

After two seasons with Maccabi Haifa he was released from his contract and on September 16, 2013, Yampolsky moved to play for the local rival Hapoel Haifa under a contract of $90,000 per season. He played in Hapoel for only one season.

On August 19, 2014, Yampolsky signed a one-year deal with Hapoel Ra'anana. After an unsuccessful season with Ra'anana, he moved to play in the Liga Leumit with Bnei Lod for the 2015–16 season. He was released from Bnei Lod in January 2016. On July 10, 2016, Yampolsky signed for one season with Sektzia Ness Ziona from Liga Alef.

In January 2019, Yampolsky joined Shimshon Kfar Qasem.

== Club career statistics ==
(correct as of 28 August 2014)

Club	Season	League			Cup			Toto Cup			Europe			Total		
Club	Season	Apps	Goals	Assists	Apps	Goals	Assists	Apps	Goals	Assists	Apps	Goals	Assists	Apps	Goals	Assists
Maccabi Netanya	2005–06	6	0	0	0	0	0	5	1	1	0	0	0	11	1	1
Maccabi Netanya	2006–07	7	1	0	1	0	0	5	0	0	0	0	0	13	1	0
Maccabi Netanya	2007–08	31	3	1	4	0	0	6	3	2	2	0	0	43	6	3
Maccabi Netanya	2008–09	23	1	0	1	1	0	8	0	0	0	0	0	32	2	0
Maccabi Netanya	2009–10	26	1	0	1	0	0	4	0	0	3	1	0	34	2	0
Maccabi Netanya	2010–11	34	7	3	4	0	0	6	0	1	0	0	0	44	7	4
Maccabi Haifa	2011-12	26	4	3	4	2	0	3	0	0	9	2	2	42	8	5
Maccabi Haifa	2012-13	8	0	1	1	0	0	6	1	0	0	0	0	15	1	1
Hapoel Haifa	2013-14	18	0	3	2	0	0	0	0	0	0	0	0	20	0	3
Hapoel Ra'anana	2014-15	11	0	0	2	0	0	1	0	0	0	0	0	13	0	0
Hapoel Bnei Lod	2015-16	14	1	0	0	0	0	1	1	0	0	0	0	15	2	0
Career		204	18	11	20	3	0	45	6	4	14	3	2	279	30	16

== Honours ==
- Israeli Premier League:
  - Runner-up (3): 2006–07, 2007–08, 2012–13
- Israel State Cup:
  - Runner-up (1): 2012
