= Libor Kovařík =

Czech football referee

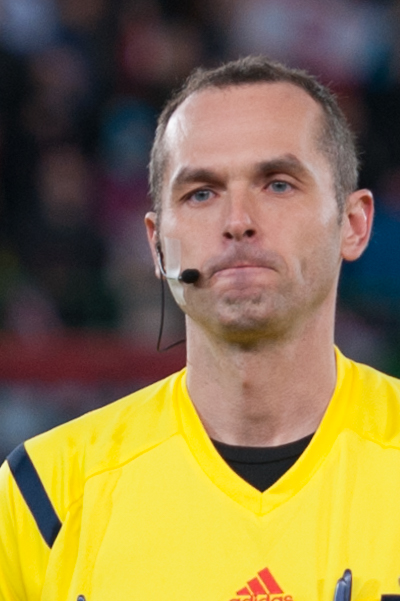
- Born: 23 February 1976 (age 50); Czechoslovakia

Domestic
| Years | League | Role |

International
| Years | League | Role |
| 2006– | FIFA listed | Referee |

Libor Kovařík (born 23 February 1976) is a former Czech football referee. He has been a full international for FIFA since 2006.

Kovařík served as a referee in 2010 World Cup qualifiers.

== Career statistics ==
Statistics for Gambrinus liga matches only.

| Season | Games | Total (yellow card) | (yellow card) per game | Total (red card) | (red card) per game | Reference |
|---|---|---|---|---|---|---|
| 2006/07 | 15 | 56 | 3.73 | 3 | 0.2 | |
| 2007/08 | 22 | 113 | 5.14 | 1 | 0.05 | |
| 2008/09 | 20 | 93 | 4.65 | 3 | 0.15 | |
| 2009/10 | 19 | 82 | 4.32 | 4 | 0.21 | |
| 2010/11 | 15 | 57 | 3.8 | 1 | 0.07 | |
| Overall | 91 | 401 | 4.41 | 12 | 0.13 | |
Please Note: There are no available records prior to 2006/2007
