= Alon Yefet =

Israeli football referee (born 1972)

Alon Yefet אלון יפת
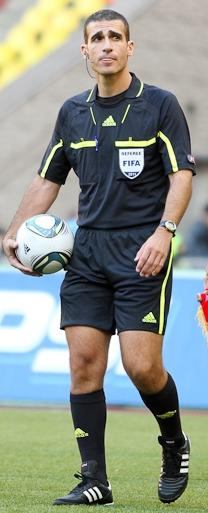
- Born: September 1, 1972 (age 53); Netanya, Israel

Alon Yefet (Hebrew: אלון יפת; born September 1, 1972) is a former international football referee who was the first Israeli to officiate a UEFA Champions League match.

Yefet became a FIFA referee in 2001. He has served as a referee in qualifying matches for the 2006, 2010, and 2014 World Cups. In addition, Yefet officiated matches in 2003-04 UEFA Cup and 2011-12 UEFA Champions League.

Yefet officiated his last match in 2019.
