= Moreira (name) =

Moreira (European Portuguese: [muˈɾɐjɾɐ]) is primarily a Portuguese-language surname. Origin: Portuguese amoreira (mulberry tree). Notable people with the name include:

== Given name ==
- Moreira Chonguiça, Mozambican jazz saxophonist

== Surname ==
=== Arts and entertainment ===
- Airto Moreira (born 1941), Brazilian musician
- Antonio Moreira (1897–?), Portuguese poet
- Moraes Moreira (1947–2020), Brazilian musician and singer
- Moreira da Silva (1902–2000), Brazilian singer and songwriter
- Rafael Moreira (born 1974), Brazilian musician

=== Journalism ===
- Paul Moreira (born 1961), a Portuguese-French investigative journalist and television documentary filmmaker.

=== Politics ===
- Adriano Moreira (1922–2022), Portuguese politician
- Afonso Augusto Moreira Pena, Brazilian politician
- Delfim Moreira (1868–1920), Brazilian politician
- Eurídice Moreira (1939–2020), Brazilian politician
- Fabrizio Moreira (born 1982), Ecuadorian politician
- Humberto Moreira Valdés, Mexican politician
- Leonardo Fernandes Moreira (1974–2020), Brazilian politician
- Moreira Franco (born 1944), Brazilian politician

=== Sports ===
==== Football ====
- Abel Fernando Moreira Ferreira (born 1981), Brazilian football manager and former player
- Ademar Moreira Marques (born 1981), Portuguese former football midfielder
- Adriano Moreira (footballer) (born 1983), Portuguese former football goalkeeper
- Ahmad Mendes Moreira (born 1995), Dutch football winger
- Alfredo Moreira (born 1938), Portuguese former football defender
- Almami Moreira (born 1978), Guinea-Bissauan former football midfielder
- Álvaro Adrián Núñez Moreira (born 1973), Uruguayan-Spanish former football goalkeeper
- André Luiz Moreira (born 1974), Brazilian former football attacking midfielder
- André Moreira (born 1995), Portuguese football goalkeeper
- Andre Moreira Neles (1978–2020), Brazilian-Equatoginean football striker and gospel singer
- Argenis Moreira (born 1987), Ecuadorian football defender
- Artur Moreira (born 1984), Portuguese football player
- Augusto César Moreira (born 1992), Brazilian football player
- Aymoré Moreira (1912–1998), Brazilian football goalkeeper and coach
- Ben-Hur Moreira Peres (born 1977), Brazilian former football player
- Benvindo António Moreira (born 1989), football player
- Bruno (footballer, born 1989) (born 1989), Brazilian football player
- Bruno Miguel Moreira de Sousa (born 1982), Portuguese football central defender
- Bruno Moreira (born 1987), Portuguese football forward
- Cândido Alves Moreira da Costa (born 1981), Portuguese former football right back
- Carlos Gabriel Moreira de Oliveira (born 1999), Brazilian football left-back
- Cassiano Dias Moreira (born 1989), Brazilian football forward
- Clayton de Sousa Moreira (born 1988), Luxembourgian football right back
- Clésio Moreira dos Santos (born 1958), Brazilian football referee
- Dalton Moreira Neto (born 1990), Brazilian football defender
- Daniel Jesus Moreira Carvalho (born 1995), Portuguese football goalkeeper
- Daniel Moreira (born 1977), French former football striker
- Danilo Moreira Serrano (born 1980), Brazilian football player
- David Luiz Moreira Marinho (born 1987), Brazilian football player
- Diego Eli Moreira (born 1988), Brazilian-born Hong Kong football player
- Dodi (footballer) (born 1996), Douglas Moreira Fagundes, Brazilian football midfielder
- Douglas Felipe Moreira Cobo (born 1987), Brazilian football player
- Edinho (footballer, born 1994) (born 1994), Brazilian football midfielder
- Edmilson Jesus Moreira Mendes (born 1997), Cape Verdean football defender
- Eduardo Moreira Fernandes (born 1977), Capeverdean football midfielder
- Edu (footballer, born 1974) (born 1974), Eduardo Araújo Moreira, Brazilian former football midfielder
- Elías Moreira (born ?), Brazilian football player
- Enderson Moreira (born 1971), Brazilian football manager
- Fabio Daniel Moreira Barros (born 1987), Portuguese football player
- Fábio Emanuel Moreira Silva (born 1985), Cape Verdean football midfielder
- Fabio Moreira (born 1972), Brazilian former football player
- Fábio Ruben Moreira Tavares (born 26 March 1988), Portuguese football forward
- Facundo Moreira (born 1989), Uruguayan football midfielder
- Felipe Moreira (born 1981), Brazilian former football midfielder and manager
- Felipe Moreira Santos (born 1988), Brazilian football player
- Francisco Moreira (1915–1991), Portuguese football midfielder
- Francisco Moreira da Silva Rebelo (born 1947), Portuguese former football right back
- Geraldo Moreira da Silva Júnior (born 1974), Brazilian football attacking midfielder
- Gleison Wilson da Silva Moreira (born 1995), Brazilian football player
- Guilherme Rodrigues Moreira (born 1987), Brazilian football player
- Héctor Moreira (born 1987), Guatemalan international football defender
- Hilton Moreira (born 1981), Brazilian football striker
- Hugo Moreira (footballer, born 1982) (born 1982), Portuguese former football winger
- Hugo Moreira (footballer, born 1990) (born 1990), Portuguese football defender
- Igor Araújo (footballer) (born 1987), Portuguese football goalkeeper
- Ismael Moreira Braga (born 1945), Brazilian football right back
- Jaime Moreira Pacheco (born 1958), Portuguese football manager, and former football central midfielder
- Jansen José Moreira (1927–2010), Brazilian football player
- Jean (footballer, born 1986), Brazilian football defensive midfielder
- Jefferson Moreira Nascimento (born 1988), Brazilian football player
- João Mendes (footballer, born 1988) (born 1988), Portuguese football forward
- João Moreira (footballer, born 1970) (born 1970), Portuguese former football player
- João Moreira (footballer, born 1986) (born 1986), Portuguese football forward
- João Moreira (footballer, born 1988) (born 1988), Portuguese football forward
- João Moreira (footballer, born 1998) (born 1998), Portuguese football defender
- João Moreira (footballer, born 2004), (born 2004), Brazilian-born Portuguese football player
- João Paulo (footballer, born 1992) (born 1992), Portuguese football player
- Joaquín Piquerez Moreira (born 1998), Uruguayan football midfielder
- Jonathan Luiz Moreira Rosa Júnior (born 1999), Brazilian football forward
- Jonathan Moreira (born 1986), Brazilian football right back
- Jonathan Moreira (footballer, born 1996) (born 1996), Argentine football midfielder
- Jorge Carlos Santos Moreira Baptista (born 1977), Portuguese former football goalkeeper
- Jorge Javier Moreira Pereira (born 1998), Venezuelan football midfielder
- Jorge Moreira (born 1990), Paraguayan football right back
- José Gerardo Moreira Rocha Júnior (born 1977), Brazilian football player
- José Manuel Moreiras (1976–2019), Argentine football player
- José Moreira (born 1982), Portuguese former football goalkeeper
- José Semedo (footballer, born 1985) (born 1985), Portuguese football defensive midfielder
- José Varela (footballer) (born 1997), Cape Verdean football winger
- Josimar Moreira (born 1988), Brazilian football player
- Júlio César Mendes Moreira (born 1983), Brazilian former football player
- Julio Cesar Moreira Ribeiro (born 1995), Brazilian football striker
- Juninho (footballer, born 5 April 1985) (born 1985), Brazilian football forward
- Leonardo Moreira (born 1986), Japanese football player
- Leonardo Moreira Morais (born 1991), Brazilian football right back
- Leonel Moreira (born ) national football goalkeeper
- Ligger Moreira Malaquias (born ), Brazilian football player
- Ligia Moreira (born 1992), Ecuadorian football defender
- Luis Andrés Moreira (born 1996), Ecuadorian football player
- Luis Moreira (born 1978), Ecuadorian football midfielder
- Luíz Carlos Martins Moreira (born 1985), Brazilian football defensive midfielder
- Márcio Gama Moreira (born 1984), Brazilian football left-back
- Marco Aurélio (footballer, born 1952) (born 1952), Brazilian former football manager
- Mariela Moreira (born 1983), Bolivian football centre back
- Moreira E Silva Alison Pierre (born 1988), Brazilian football player
- Natanael (footballer, born 2002) (born 2002), Brazilian football player
- Nuno Silva (footballer, born 1986) (born 1986), Portuguese football player
- Osmar Francisco Moreira Jesuino (born 1987), Brazilian football forward
- Ozu Moreira (born 1986), Brazilian-born Japanese beach football defender
- Paulo Sérgio (footballer, born 1984) (born 1984), Portuguese football player
- Paulo Sérgio Moreira Gonçalves (born 1984), Portuguese football player
- Pavão (footballer, born 1974) (born 1974), former football right back
- Pedrinho (footballer, born 1992) (born 1992), Portuguese football player
- Pedro Bispo Moreira Júnior (born 1987), Brazilian striker
- Pedro Ken Morimoto Moreira (born 1987), Brazilian football player
- Pedro Manuel Taborda Moreira (born 1978), Portuguese former football goalkeeper
- Pedro Moreira (Cape Verdean footballer)
- Pedro Moreira (footballer, born 1983) (born 1983), Portuguese former football right back
- Pedro Moreira (footballer, born 1989) (born 1989), Portuguese football midfielder
- Pedro Silva (footballer, born 1997) (born 1997), Portuguese football goalkeeper
- Rafael Moreira (footballer) (born 1990), Brazilian football player
- Ramón Osni Moreira Lage (born 1988), Brazilian football attacking midfielder
- Renato Adriano Jacó Moreira (born 1984), Brazilian football player
- Ricardo Costa (footballer, born 1981) (born 1981), Portuguese former football player
- Ricardo Moreira (born 1983), Argentine football player
- Roberto de Assis Moreira (born 1971), former football player
- Roberto Moreira (footballer, born 1977) (born 1977), Brazilian football midfielder
- Roberto Moreira (footballer, born 1987) (born 1987), Paraguayan football forward
- Rodrigo Moreira (footballer, born 1996) (born 1996), Argentine football defender
- Rodrigo Moreira (footballer, born 2001) (born 2001), Uruguayan football forward
- Ronaldinho (born 1980), Brazilian football player
- Rui Moreira (footballer) (born 1996), Portuguese football midfielder
- Sávio Moreira de Oliveira (born 2004), Brazilian football forward
- Steven Moreira (born 1994), French football right back
- Thiago Luiz Moreira de Araújo (born 1988), Brazilian football player
- Tiago César Moreira Pereira (born 1975), Portuguese former football player
- Tiago Moreira (born 1988), Portuguese football right back
- Valdeir Celso Moreira (born 1967), Brazilian former football player
- Vatinei César Moreira dos Santos (born 1979), Brazilian football player.
- Víctor Moreira (born 1982), Andorran international football midfielder
- Vinícius Moreira de Lima (born 1996), Brazilian football attacking midfielder
- Vítor Hugo Fernandes Moreira (born 1982), Portuguese football goalkeeper
- Walisson Moreira Farias Maia (born 1991), Brazilian football central defender.
- Weverson (footballer, born 2000) (born 2000), Brazilian football left-back
- Yago Moreira Silva (born 1994), Brazilian football winger
- Yefferson Moreira (born 1991), Uruguayan football player
- Zezé Moreira (1917–1998), Brazilian football player

==== Other sports ====
- Fatima Moreira de Melo (born 1978), Dutch field hockey player
- Federico Moreira (born 1961), Uruguayan cyclist
- João Moreira (jockey) (born 1983), Brazilian jockey
- José Moreira (swimmer) (born 1962), Brazilian swimmer
- Juraci Moreira (born 1979), Brazilian triathlete
- Pablo Moreira (born 1970), Argentine field hockey player
- Paulão Moreira (1969–2025), Brazilian beach volleyball player

=== Crime ===
- Erismar Rodrigues Moreira (died 2005), Brazilian gang leader
- Juan Moreira (died 1874), Argentine gaucho outlaw and folk-hero

=== Other ===
- Daniela Moreira, Argentine-American chef and restaurateur

== See also ==
- João Moreira (disambiguation)
- Pedro Moreira (disambiguation)
