= 2009–10 UEFA Champions League qualifying =

European football tournament

2009–10 UEFA Champions League qualifying was the preliminary phase of the 2009–10 UEFA Champions League, prior to the competition proper. Qualification consisted of the qualifying phase (first to third rounds) and the play-off round.

There were two paths:

- Champions Path, which included all domestic champions which did not automatically qualify for the group stage.
- Non-Champions Path (also called the Best-placed Path), which included all non-domestic champions which did not automatically qualify for the group stage.

All times are CEST (UTC+2).

== Teams ==
This table shows the path of all 54 teams (39 in Champions Path, 15 in Non-Champions Path) involved in the qualifying phase and play-off round. 10 teams (5 in Champions Path, 5 in Non-Champions Path) qualified for the group stage to join the 22 automatic qualifiers.

Key to colours
Qualified for the group stage
Eliminated in the play-off round; Advanced to the Europa League group stage
Eliminated in the third qualifying round; Advanced to the Europa League play-off round

=== Champions Path ===
Third qualifying round
Team	Coeff.
(Greece) Olympiacos	52.633
(Czech Republic) Slavia Prague	25.150
(Switzerland) Zürich	14.050

Second qualifying round
Team	Coeff.
(Denmark) Copenhagen	26.890
(Bulgaria) Levski Sofia	24.250
(Serbia) Partizan	23.050
(Israel) Maccabi Haifa	17.050
(Croatia) Dinamo Zagreb	16.466
(Poland) Wisła Kraków	9.583
(Belarus) BATE Borisov	7.733
(Austria) Red Bull Salzburg	6.565
(Sweden) Kalmar FF	4.938
(Cyprus) APOEL	4.016
(Norway) Stabæk	3.760
(Slovakia) Slovan Bratislava	2.933
(Latvia) Ventspils	2.832
(Slovenia) Maribor	2.816
(Iceland) FH	2.333
(Finland) Inter Turku	1.958
(Lithuania) Ekranas	1.933
(Republic of Ireland) Bohemians	1.899
(Bosnia and Herzegovina) Zrinjski Mostar	1.733
(Hungary) Debrecen	1.633
(Moldova) Sheriff Tiraspol	1.333
(Georgia (country)) WIT Georgia	1.332
(North Macedonia) Makedonija GP	1.033
(Azerbaijan) Baku	0.899
(Estonia) Levadia Tallinn	0.866
(Albania) Tirana	0.799
(Kazakhstan) Aktobe	0.649
(Armenia) Pyunik	0.599
(Wales) Rhyl	0.466
(Northern Ireland) Glentoran	0.433
(Faroe Islands) EB/Streymur	0.433
(Luxembourg) F91 Dudelange	0.266

First qualifying round
Team	Coeff.
(Montenegro) Mogren	0.200
(Andorra) Sant Julià	0.100
(Malta) Hibernians	0.099
(San Marino) Tre Fiori	0.050

=== Non-Champions Path ===
Play-off round
Team	Coeff.
(England) Arsenal	106.899
(France) Lyon	91.033
(Germany) VfB Stuttgart	45.339
(Italy) Fiorentina	42.582
(Spain) Atlético Madrid	41.853

Third qualifying round
Team	Coeff.
(Ukraine) Shakhtar Donetsk	74.370
(Portugal) Sporting CP	68.292
(Greece) Panathinaikos	56.633
(Scotland) Celtic	40.575
(Belgium) Anderlecht	32.065
(Czech Republic) Sparta Prague	26.150
(Netherlands) Twente	17.826
(Russia) Dynamo Moscow	9.525
(Romania) Timișoara	7.781
(Turkey) Sivasspor	6.445

== First qualifying round ==
=== Seeding ===
Teams with a coefficient of at least 0.100 were seeded.

Seeded	Unseeded
(Montenegro) Mogren (Andorra) Sant Julià	(Malta) Hibernians (San Marino) Tre Fiori

=== Summary ===
Team 1	Agg.	Team 2	1st leg	2nd leg
Tre Fiori (San Marino)	2–2 (4–5 p) (Note: Order of legs switched after original draw.)	(Andorra) Sant Julià	1–1	1–1 (a.e.t.)
Hibernians (Malta)	0–6	(Montenegro) Mogren	0–2	0–4

=== Matches ===
1 July 2009
20:30

Tre Fiori (San Marino)	1–1	(Andorra) Sant Julià
Andreini 75'	Report	Xinos 42' (pen.)

Stadio Fonte Dell'Ovo, San Marino
Attendance: 564
Referee: Damir Batinić (Croatia)
7 July 2009
19:00

Sant Julià (Andorra)	1–1 (a.e.t.)	(San Marino) Tre Fiori
Moreira 39'	Report	Canarezza 82'
Penalties
Xinos (penalty scored); Varela (penalty missed); Machado (penalty scored); Matamala (penalty scored); Mejias (penalty scored); Wagner (penalty scored)	5–4	(penalty scored) Lisi; (penalty scored) Andreini; (penalty missed) Ballanti; (penalty scored) Giunta; (penalty scored) Benedettini; (penalty missed) Rodriguez

Estadi Comunal d'Aixovall, Andorra la Vella
Attendance: 800
Referee: Sokol Jareci (Albania)

2–2 on aggregate; Sant Julià won 5–4 on penalties.

30 June 2009
18:30

Hibernians (Malta)	0–2	(Montenegro) Mogren
	Report	Ćetković 32'; Grbić 88'

Centenary Stadium, Ta' Qali
Attendance: 620
Referee: Luc Wilmes (Luxembourg)
8 July 2009
20:30

Mogren (Montenegro)	4–0	(Malta) Hibernians
Milić 41'; Grbić 45+1', 80'; Ćetković 51'	Report

Stadion Pod Goricom, Podgorica (Note: Mogren played their home games in Podgorica at Stadion Pod Goricom as their own Stadion Mogren did not meet UEFA criteria.)
Attendance: 3,000
Referee: Huw Jones (Wales)

Mogren won 6–0 on aggregate.

== Second qualifying round ==
=== Seeding ===
Teams with a coefficient of at least 1.933 were seeded.

Seeded		Unseeded	
(Denmark) Copenhagen (Bulgaria) Levski Sofia (Serbia) Partizan (Israel) Maccabi Haifa (Croatia) Dinamo Zagreb (Poland) Wisła Kraków (Belarus) BATE Borisov (Austria) Red Bull Salzburg (Sweden) Kalmar FF	(Cyprus) APOEL (Norway) Stabæk (Slovakia) Slovan Bratislava (Latvia) Ventspils (Slovenia) Maribor (Iceland) FH (Finland) Inter Turku (Lithuania) Ekranas	(Republic of Ireland) Bohemians (Bosnia and Herzegovina) Zrinjski Mostar (Hungary) Debrecen (Moldova) Sheriff Tiraspol (Georgia (country)) WIT Georgia (North Macedonia) Makedonija GP (Azerbaijan) Baku (Estonia) Levadia Tallinn (Albania) Tirana	(Kazakhstan) Aktobe (Armenia) Pyunik (Wales) Rhyl (Northern Ireland) Glentoran (Faroe Islands) EB/Streymur (Luxembourg) F91 Dudelange (Montenegro) Mogren (Andorra) Sant Julià

Notes

1. ^{†} Winners of the previous qualifying round whose identity were not known at the time of the draw.

=== Summary ===
Team 1	Agg.	Team 2	1st leg	2nd leg
Tirana (Albania)	1–5	(Norway) Stabæk	1–1	0–4
WIT Georgia (Georgia (country))	1–3	(Slovenia) Maribor	0–0	1–3
EB/Streymur (Faroe Islands)	0–5	(Cyprus) APOEL	0–2	0–3
Copenhagen (Denmark)	12–0	(Montenegro) Mogren	6–0	6–0
Debrecen (Hungary)	3–3 (a)	(Sweden) Kalmar FF	2–0	1–3
Makedonija GP (North Macedonia)	0–4	(Belarus) BATE Borisov	0–2	0–2
FH (Iceland)	0–6	(Kazakhstan) Aktobe	0–4	0–2
Pyunik (Armenia)	0–3	(Croatia) Dinamo Zagreb	0–0	0–3
Ventspils (Latvia)	6–1	(Luxembourg) F91 Dudelange	3–0	3–1
Ekranas (Lithuania)	4–6	(Azerbaijan) Baku	2–2	2–4
Red Bull Salzburg (Austria)	2–1	(Republic of Ireland) Bohemians	1–1	1–0
Zrinjski Mostar (Bosnia and Herzegovina)	1–4	(Slovakia) Slovan Bratislava	1–0	0–4
Inter Turku (Finland)	0–2	(Moldova) Sheriff Tiraspol	0–1	0–1
Rhyl (Wales)	0–12	(Serbia) Partizan	0–4	0–8
Wisła Kraków (Poland)	1–2	(Estonia) Levadia Tallinn	1–1	0–1
Levski Sofia (Bulgaria)	9–0	(Andorra) Sant Julià	4–0	5–0
Maccabi Haifa (Israel)	10–0	(Northern Ireland) Glentoran	6–0	4–0

=== Matches ===
15 July 2009
20:00

Tirana (Albania)	1–1	(Norway) Stabæk
Muka 50'	Report	Kobayashi 34'

Qemal Stafa Stadium, Tirana (Note: Played in Tirana at Qemal Stafa Stadium as Tirana's Selman Stërmasi Stadium did not meet UEFA criteria.)
Attendance: 3,500
Referee: Robert Schörgenhofer (Austria)
21 July 2009
20:45

Stabæk (Norway)	4–0	(Albania) Tirana
Segerström 15', 17'; Berglund 44'; Farnerud 55'	Report

Telenor Arena, Bærum
Attendance: 4,783
Referee: Thorsten Kinhöfer (Germany)

Stabæk won 5–1 on aggregate.

15 July 2009
18:00

WIT Georgia (Georgia (country))	0–0	(Slovenia) Maribor
	Report

Mikheil Meskhi Stadium, Tbilisi (Note: Played in Tbilisi at Mikheil Meskhi Stadium as WIT Georgia's Shevardeni Stadium did not meet UEFA criteria.)
Attendance: 3,000
Referee: Haanes Kaasik (Estonia)
22 July 2009
20:45

Maribor (Slovenia)	3–1	(Georgia (country)) WIT Georgia
Bunderla 9'; Tavares 19'; Mihelič 86'	Report	Kvaratskhelia 45+1'

Ljudski vrt, Maribor
Attendance: 6,100
Referee: Cristian Balaj (Romania)

Maribor won 3–1 on aggregate.

14 July 2009
20:00

EB/Streymur (Faroe Islands)	0–2	(Cyprus) APOEL
	Report	Mirosavljević 10'; Żewłakow 77'

Tórsvøllur, Tórshavn (Note: Played in Tórshavn at Tórsvøllur as EB/Streymur's Við Margáir did not meet UEFA criteria.)
Attendance: 642
Referee: Oleg Oriekhov (Ukraine)
21 July 2009
19:00

APOEL (Cyprus)	3–0	(Faroe Islands) EB/Streymur
Żewłakow 42'; Alexandrou 63'; Mirosavljević 75'	Report

GSP Stadium, Nicosia
Attendance: 9,054
Referee: Cyril Zimmermann (Switzerland)

APOEL won 5–0 on aggregate.

15 July 2009
20:15

Copenhagen (Denmark)	6–0	(Montenegro) Mogren
Kristensen 8'; Jørgensen 16'; Aílton 24'; N'Doye 69', 74'; Nordstrand 82'	Report

Parken Stadium, Copenhagen
Attendance: 12,226
Referee: Selçuk Dereli (Turkey)
22 July 2009
20:30

Mogren (Montenegro)	0–6	(Denmark) Copenhagen
	Report	N'Doye 11', 40'; Nordstrand 16'; Vingaard 43'; Delaney 47'; Aílton 87'

Stadion Pod Goricom, Podgorica
Attendance: 2,100
Referee: Alexandru Deaconu (Romania)

Copenhagen won 12–0 on aggregate.

15 July 2009
20:00

Debrecen (Hungary)	2–0	(Sweden) Kalmar FF
J. Varga 73'; Kiss 86'	Report

Stadion Oláh Gábor Út, Debrecen
Attendance: 7,500
Referee: Fredy Fautrel (France)
22 July 2009
19:00

Kalmar FF (Sweden)	3–1	(Hungary) Debrecen
R. Elm 19', 71' (pen.); Mendes 32'	Report	J. Varga 13'

Fredriksskans, Kalmar
Attendance: 3,886
Referee: Stanislav Sukhina (Russia)

3–3 on aggregate; Debrecen won on away goals.

14 July 2009
17:00

Makedonija GP (North Macedonia)	0–2	(Belarus) BATE Borisov
	Report	Krivets 40'; Skavysh 49'

Gradski Stadion, Skopje (Note: Played in Skopje at City Stadium Skopje as Makedonija Gjorče Petrov's Gjorče Petrov Stadium did not meet UEFA criteria.)
Attendance: 1,680
Referee: Peter Rasmussen (Denmark)
21 July 2009
18:00

BATE Borisov (Belarus)	2–0	(North Macedonia) Makedonija GP
Sosnovski 83'; Rodionov 90+3'	Report

City Stadium, Borisov
Attendance: 3,000
Referee: Tony Asumaa (Finland)

BATE Borisov won 4–0 on aggregate.

15 July 2009
21:15

FH (Iceland)	0–4	(Kazakhstan) Aktobe
	Report	Tleshev 49'; Golovskoy 57', 85'; Khairullin 70'

Kaplakriki, Hafnarfjörður
Attendance: 1,586
Referee: Robert Małek (Poland)
22 July 2009
18:00

Aktobe (Kazakhstan)	2–0	(Iceland) FH
Smakov 20'; Tleshev 67'	Report

Aktobe Central Stadium, Aktobe
Attendance: 12,800
Referee: Aleksei Kulbakov (Belarus)

Aktobe won 6–0 on aggregate.

14 July 2009
17:00

Pyunik (Armenia)	0–0	(Croatia) Dinamo Zagreb
	Report

Vazgen Sargsyan Republican Stadium, Yerevan
Attendance: 2,500
Referee: Paolo Tagliavento (Italy)
21 July 2009
20:30

Dinamo Zagreb (Croatia)	3–0	(Armenia) Pyunik
Mandžukić 30'; Badelj 61'; Lovren 66'	Report

Stadion Maksimir, Zagreb
Attendance: 0 (Note: Match played behind closed doors due to unruly behaviour by Dinamo Zagreb supporters at their last European away match against Udinese.)
Referee: Duarte Gomes (Portugal)

Dinamo Zagreb won 3–0 on aggregate.

15 July 2009
17:00

Ventspils (Latvia)	3–0	(Luxembourg) F91 Dudelange
Butriks 79'; Kačanovs 86'; Rimkus 87'	Report

Ventspils Olimpiskais Stadions, Ventspils
Attendance: 2,630
Referee: Marcin Borski (Poland)
22 July 2009
18:00

F91 Dudelange (Luxembourg)	1–3	(Latvia) Ventspils
Dan. da Mota 15'	Report	Astafjevs 27'; Butriks 57'; Mihadjuks 67'

Stade Jos Nosbaum, Dudelange
Attendance: 1,165
Referee: Martin Ingvarsson (Sweden)

Ventspils won 6–1 on aggregate.

14 July 2009
20:00

Ekranas (Lithuania)	2–2	(Azerbaijan) Baku
Bička 53' (pen.); Trakys 90+3'	Report	Félix 78'; Batista 90+1'

Aukštaitija Stadium, Panevėžys
Attendance: 3,621
Referee: Sascha Kever (Switzerland)
21 July 2009
17:00

Baku (Azerbaijan)	4–2	(Lithuania) Ekranas
Félix 59', 77'; Mujiri 65'; Šolić 90+1'	Report	Matović 81'; Gleveckas 90+2'

Tofik Bakhramov Stadium, Baku
Attendance: 22,000
Referee: Serge Gumienny (Belgium)

Baku won 6–4 on aggregate.

15 July 2009
20:30

Red Bull Salzburg (Austria)	1–1	(Republic of Ireland) Bohemians
Dudić 25'	Report	N'Do 60'

Red Bull Arena, Wals-Siezenheim
Attendance: 10,229
Referee: Nicolai Vollquartz (Denmark)
22 July 2009
20:30

Bohemians (Republic of Ireland)	0–1	(Austria) Red Bull Salzburg
	Report	Ježek 87'

Dalymount Park, Dublin
Attendance: 5,944
Referee: Aleksandar Stavrev (Macedonia)

Red Bull Salzburg won 2–1 on aggregate.

15 July 2009
20:30

Zrinjski Mostar (Bosnia and Herzegovina)	1–0	(Slovakia) Slovan Bratislava
Kordić 48'	Report

Bijeli Brijeg Stadium, Mostar
Attendance: 7,400
Referee: Dougie McDonald (Scotland)
21 July 2009
19:30

Slovan Bratislava (Slovakia)	4–0	(Bosnia and Herzegovina) Zrinjski Mostar
Halenár 13', 60'; Gaúcho 19'; Sylvestr 90+2'	Report

Tehelné pole, Bratislava
Attendance: 13,850
Referee: Saïd Ennjimi (France)

Slovan Bratislava won 4–1 on aggregate.

15 July 2009
17:30

Inter Turku (Finland)	0–1	(Moldova) Sheriff Tiraspol
	Report	Suvorov 42' (pen.)

Veritas Stadion, Turku
Attendance: 5,108
Referee: Zsolt Szabó (Hungary)
21 July 2009
19:00

Sheriff Tiraspol (Moldova)	1–0	(Finland) Inter Turku
Suvorov 69' (pen.)	Report

Sheriff Stadium, Tiraspol
Attendance: 8,500
Referee: Carlos Velasco Carballo (Spain)

Sheriff Tiraspol won 2–0 on aggregate.

14 July 2009
20:45

Rhyl (Wales)	0–4	(Serbia) Partizan
	Report	Krstajić 17'; Cléo 18'; Diarra 45+1'; Đorđević 69'

Belle Vue, Rhyl
Attendance: 1,726
Referee: César Muñiz Fernández (Spain)
21 July 2009
20:45

Partizan (Serbia)	8–0	(Wales) Rhyl
Diarra 4'; Cléo 17', 51', 72' (pen.); Đorđević 20'; Ilić 38', 63'; Petrović 66'	Report

Partizan Stadium, Belgrade
Attendance: 9,321
Referee: Markus Strömbergsson (Sweden)

Partizan won 12–0 on aggregate.

15 July 2009
20:30

Wisła Kraków (Poland)	1–1	(Estonia) Levadia Tallinn
Ćwielong 90+3'	Report	Andreyev 41'

Stadion Ludowy, Sosnowiec (Note: Played in Sosnowiec at Stadion Ludowy as Wisła Kraków's Stadion im. Henryka Reymana was undergoing extensive renovative work.)
Attendance: 3,000
Referee: Tommy Skjerven (Norway)
22 July 2009
18:00

Levadia Tallinn (Estonia)	1–0	(Poland) Wisła Kraków
Ivanov 90'	Report

Kadriorg Stadium, Tallinn
Attendance: 3,700
Referee: Cüneyt Çakır (Turkey)

Levadia Tallinn won 2–1 on aggregate.

15 July 2009
18:45

Levski Sofia (Bulgaria)	4–0	(Andorra) Sant Julià
Tasevski 50'; Hristov 64', 72'; Gadzhev 82'	Report

Georgi Asparuhov Stadium, Sofia
Attendance: 7,656
Referee: Levan Paniashvili (Georgia)
21 July 2009
18:45

Sant Julià (Andorra)	0–5	(Bulgaria) Levski Sofia
	Report	Ognyanov 23', 40'; Yovov 34'; Tsachev 83'; Kirov 87'

Estadi Comunal d'Aixovall, Andorra la Vella
Attendance: 230
Referee: Jouny Hyytiä (Finland)

Levski Sofia won 9–0 on aggregate.

15 July 2009
19:50

Maccabi Haifa (Israel)	6–0	(Northern Ireland) Glentoran
Refaelov 36'; Katan 52'; Dvalishvili 57', 81'; Arbeitman 83'; Ghadir 89'	Report

Kiryat Eliezer Stadium, Haifa
Attendance: 8,256
Referee: Aleksei Nikolaev (Russia)
22 July 2009
19:50

Glentoran (Northern Ireland)	0–4	(Israel) Maccabi Haifa
	Report	Bello 9', 53'; Masilela 62'; Arbeitman 90+2'

The Oval, Belfast
Attendance: 872
Referee: Espen Berntsen (Norway)

Maccabi Haifa won 10–0 on aggregate.

== Third qualifying round ==
=== Seeding ===
In the Champions Path, teams with a coefficient of at least 7.733 were seeded. Levadia Tallinn were also seeded because the draw was held before the second qualifying round, in which they beat a team who would have been seeded. In the Non-Champions Path, teams with a coefficient of at least 32.065 were seeded.

Champions Path		Non-Champions Path	
Seeded	Unseeded	Seeded	Unseeded
(Greece) Olympiacos (Denmark) Copenhagen (Czech Republic) Slavia Prague (Bulgaria) Levski Sofia (Serbia) Partizan (Israel) Maccabi Haifa (Croatia) Dinamo Zagreb (Switzerland) Zürich (Estonia) Levadia Tallinn (Belarus) BATE Borisov	(Austria) Red Bull Salzburg (Hungary) Debrecen (Cyprus) APOEL (Norway) Stabæk (Slovakia) Slovan Bratislava (Latvia) Ventspils (Slovenia) Maribor (Kazakhstan) Aktobe (Moldova) Sheriff Tiraspol (Azerbaijan) Baku	(Ukraine) Shakhtar Donetsk (Portugal) Sporting CP (Greece) Panathinaikos (Scotland) Celtic (Belgium) Anderlecht	(Czech Republic) Sparta Prague (Netherlands) Twente (Russia) Dynamo Moscow (Romania) Timișoara (Turkey) Sivasspor

Notes

1. ^{†} Winners of the previous qualifying round whose identity was not known at the time of the draw. Teams in italics defeated a team with a higher coefficient in the previous qualifying round, thus effectively taking the coefficient of their defeated opponent in the draw for this round.

=== Summary ===
Team 1	Agg.	Team 2	1st leg	2nd leg
Champions Path
Red Bull Salzburg (Austria)	3–2	(Croatia) Dinamo Zagreb	1–1	2–1
Slovan Bratislava (Slovakia)	0–4	(Greece) Olympiacos	0–2	0–2
Zürich (Switzerland)	5–3	(Slovenia) Maribor	2–3	3–0
APOEL (Cyprus)	2–1	(Serbia) Partizan	2–0	0–1
Sheriff Tiraspol (Moldova)	1–1 (a)	(Czech Republic) Slavia Prague	0–0	1–1
Aktobe (Kazakhstan)	3–4	(Israel) Maccabi Haifa	0–0	3–4
Baku (Azerbaijan)	0–2	(Bulgaria) Levski Sofia	0–0	0–2
Ventspils (Latvia)	2–2 (a)	(Belarus) BATE Borisov	1–0	1–2
Levadia Tallinn (Estonia)	0–2	(Hungary) Debrecen	0–1	0–1
Copenhagen (Denmark)	3–1	(Norway) Stabæk	3–1	0–0
Non-Champions Path
Sparta Prague (Czech Republic)	3–4	(Greece) Panathinaikos	3–1	0–3
Shakhtar Donetsk (Ukraine)	2–2 (a)	(Romania) Timișoara	2–2	0–0
Sporting CP (Portugal)	1–1 (a)	(Netherlands) Twente	0–0	1–1
Celtic (Scotland)	2–1	(Russia) Dynamo Moscow	0–1	2–0
Anderlecht (Belgium)	6–3	(Turkey) Sivasspor	5–0	1–3

=== Champions Path matches ===
29 July 2009
20:30

Red Bull Salzburg (Austria)	1–1	(Croatia) Dinamo Zagreb
Zickler 45'	Report	Mandžukić 63'

Red Bull Arena, Wals-Siezenheim
Attendance: 13,608
Referee: Pavel Královec (Czech Republic)
4 August 2009
20:15

Dinamo Zagreb (Croatia)	1–2	(Austria) Red Bull Salzburg
Papadopoulos 47'	Report	Švento 33'; Nelisse 83'

Stadion Maksimir, Zagreb
Attendance: 10,243
Referee: Alain Hamer (Luxembourg)

Red Bull Salzburg won 3–2 on aggregate.

29 July 2009
20:00

Slovan Bratislava (Slovakia)	0–2	(Greece) Olympiacos
	Report	A. Papadopoulos 2'; Leonardo 21'

Tehelné pole, Bratislava
Attendance: 21,250
Referee: Claudio Circhetta (Switzerland)
5 August 2009
20:45

Olympiacos (Greece)	2–0	(Slovakia) Slovan Bratislava
Maresca 35'; Diogo 56'	Report

Karaiskakis Stadium, Piraeus
Attendance: 26,137
Referee: Konrad Plautz (Austria)

Olympiacos won 4–0 on aggregate.

29 July 2009
20:15

Zürich (Switzerland)	2–3	(Slovenia) Maribor
Vonlanthen 4'; Hassli 29'	Report	Tavares 12', 22'; Pavlović 50'

Letzigrund, Zürich
Attendance: 8,500
Referee: Eric Braamhaar (Netherlands)
5 August 2009
20:15

Maribor (Slovenia)	0–3	(Switzerland) Zürich
	Report	Djuric 21'; Margairaz 45'; Nikçi 76'

Ljudski vrt, Maribor
Attendance: 12,000
Referee: Laurent Duhamel (France)

Zürich won 5–3 on aggregate.

29 July 2009
19:00

APOEL (Cyprus)	2–0	(Serbia) Partizan
Mirosavljević 50'; Żewłakow 85'	Report

GSP Stadium, Nicosia
Attendance: 15,882
Referee: Björn Kuipers (Netherlands)
5 August 2009
20:45

Partizan (Serbia)	1–0	(Cyprus) APOEL
Moreira 3'	Report

Partizan Stadium, Belgrade
Attendance: 23,867
Referee: Matteo Trefoloni (Italy)

APOEL won 2–1 on aggregate.

29 July 2009
19:00

Sheriff Tiraspol (Moldova)	0–0	(Czech Republic) Slavia Prague
	Report

Sheriff Stadium, Tiraspol
Attendance: 10,000
Referee: Alan Kelly (Republic of Ireland)
5 August 2009
20:00

Slavia Prague (Czech Republic)	1–1	(Moldova) Sheriff Tiraspol
Hloušek 15'	Report	Nadson 90+4'

Synot Tip Arena, Prague
Attendance: 13,483
Referee: Gianluca Rocchi (Italy)

1–1 on aggregate; Sheriff Tiraspol won on away goals.

28 July 2009
18:00

Aktobe (Kazakhstan)	0–0	(Israel) Maccabi Haifa
	Report

Aktobe Central Stadium, Aktobe
Attendance: 12,850
Referee: Thomas Einwaller (Austria)
4 August 2009
19:50

Maccabi Haifa (Israel)	4–3	(Kazakhstan) Aktobe
Katan 26'; Golasa 34'; Dvalishvili 59', 62'	Report	Averchenko 8'; Chichulin 13'; Khairullin 15'

Kiryat Eliezer Stadium, Haifa
Attendance: 8,945
Referee: Serge Gumienny (Belgium)

Maccabi Haifa won 4–3 on aggregate.

28 July 2009
17:00

Baku (Azerbaijan)	0–0	(Bulgaria) Levski Sofia
	Report

Tofik Bakhramov Stadium, Baku
Attendance: 25,500
Referee: Svein Oddvar Moen (Norway)
5 August 2009
19:30

Levski Sofia (Bulgaria)	2–0	(Azerbaijan) Baku
Yovov 64'; Hristov 80'	Report

Georgi Asparuhov Stadium, Sofia
Attendance: 7,345
Referee: Stefan Johannesson (Sweden)

Levski Sofia won 2–0 on aggregate.

29 July 2009
17:00

Ventspils (Latvia)	1–0	(Belarus) BATE Borisov
Chirkin 64'	Report

Ventspils Olimpiskais Stadions, Ventspils
Attendance: 2,950
Referee: Darko Čeferin (Slovenia)
5 August 2009
18:00

BATE Borisov (Belarus)	2–1	(Latvia) Ventspils
Krivets 43', 57'	Report	Țîgîrlaș 14'

City Stadium, Borisov
Attendance: 5,336
Referee: Alexandru Tudor (Romania)

2–2 on aggregate; Ventspils won on away goals.

29 July 2009
18:00

Levadia Tallinn (Estonia)	0–1	(Hungary) Debrecen
	Report	Leandro 70'

Kadriorg Stadium, Tallinn
Attendance: 3,000
Referee: Bruno Paixão (Portugal)
5 August 2009
20:00

Debrecen (Hungary)	1–0	(Estonia) Levadia Tallinn
Coulibaly 70'	Report

Stadion Oláh Gábor Út, Debrecen
Attendance: 9,640
Referee: Damir Skomina (Slovenia)

Debrecen won 2–0 on aggregate.

29 July 2009
20:15

Copenhagen (Denmark)	3–1	(Norway) Stabæk
Grønkjær 11'; Santin 41', 80' (pen.)	Report	Pálmason 58'

Parken Stadium, Copenhagen
Attendance: 15,383
Referee: Yuri Baskakov (Russia)
5 August 2009
20:45

Stabæk (Norway)	0–0	(Denmark) Copenhagen
	Report

Telenor Arena, Bærum
Attendance: 12,562
Referee: Willie Collum (Scotland)

Copenhagen won 3–1 on aggregate.

=== Non-Champions Path matches ===
28 July 2009
20:00

Sparta Prague (Czech Republic)	3–1	(Greece) Panathinaikos
Holenda 26'; Vacek 32'; Kalouda 86'	Report	Salpingidis 67'

AXA Arena, Prague
Attendance: 12,058
Referee: Ivan Bebek (Croatia)
4 August 2009
20:45

Panathinaikos (Greece)	3–0	(Czech Republic) Sparta Prague
Sarriegi 45'; Katsouranis 54'; Salpingidis 89'	Report

Olympic Stadium, Athens
Attendance: 47,637
Referee: Pedro Proença (Portugal)

Panathinaikos won 4–3 on aggregate.

29 July 2009
19:00

Shakhtar Donetsk (Ukraine)	2–2	(Romania) Timișoara
Hladkyy 61'; Fernandinho 86'	Report	Bucur 20', 80'

RSC Olimpiyskiy, Donetsk
Attendance: 18,000
Referee: Eduardo Iturralde González (Spain)
5 August 2009
19:30

Timișoara (Romania)	0–0	(Ukraine) Shakhtar Donetsk
	Report

Stadionul Dan Păltinișanu, Timișoara
Attendance: 21,850
Referee: Terje Hauge (Norway)

2–2 on aggregate; Timișoara won on away goals.

29 July 2009
21:45

Sporting CP (Portugal)	0–0	(Netherlands) Twente
	Report

Estádio José Alvalade, Lisbon
Attendance: 37,313
Referee: Felix Brych (Germany)
4 August 2009
20:45

Twente (Netherlands)	1–1	(Portugal) Sporting CP
Douglas 2'	Report	Wisgerhof 90+5' (o.g.)

De Grolsch Veste, Enschede
Attendance: 23,700
Referee: Stéphane Lannoy (France)

1–1 on aggregate; Sporting CP won on away goals.

29 July 2009
20:45

Celtic (Scotland)	0–1	(Russia) Dynamo Moscow
	Report	Kokorin 7'

Celtic Park, Glasgow
Attendance: 54,184
Referee: Nicola Rizzoli (Italy)
5 August 2009
18:00

Dynamo Moscow (Russia)	0–2	(Scotland) Celtic
	Report	McDonald 44'; Samaras 90+1'

Arena Khimki, Khimki (Note: Played in Khimki at Arena Khimki as Dynamo Moscow's Dynamo Stadium was closed for renovation work.)
Attendance: 13,753
Referee: Jonas Eriksson (Sweden)

Celtic won 2–1 on aggregate.

28 July 2009
20:45

Anderlecht (Belgium)	5–0	(Turkey) Sivasspor
De Sutter 17', 76'; Boussoufa 22'; Chatelle 32'; Frutos 90+2'	Report

Constant Vanden Stock Stadium, Brussels
Attendance: 23,953
Referee: Craig Thomson (Scotland)
4 August 2009
20:00

Sivasspor (Turkey)	3–1	(Belgium) Anderlecht
Martin 12'; Kamanan 19' (pen.); Aydın 58'	Report	Van Damme 34'

4 Eylül, Sivas
Attendance: 7,592
Referee: Manuel Mejuto González (Spain)

Anderlecht won 6–3 on aggregate.

== Play-off round ==
=== Seeding ===
In the Champions Path, teams with a coefficient of at least 14.050 were seeded. In the Non-Champions Path, teams with a coefficient of at least 45.339 were seeded.

Champions Path		Non-Champions Path	
Seeded	Unseeded	Seeded	Unseeded
(Greece) Olympiacos (Denmark) Copenhagen (Bulgaria) Levski Sofia (Israel) Maccabi Haifa (Switzerland) Zürich	(Austria) Red Bull Salzburg (Cyprus) APOEL (Latvia) Ventspils (Hungary) Debrecen (Moldova) Sheriff Tiraspol	(England) Arsenal (France) Lyon (Portugal) Sporting CP (Greece) Panathinaikos (Germany) VfB Stuttgart	(Italy) Fiorentina (Spain) Atlético Madrid (Scotland) Celtic (Belgium) Anderlecht (Romania) Timișoara

=== Summary ===
Team 1	Agg.	Team 2	1st leg	2nd leg
Champions Path
Sheriff Tiraspol (Moldova)	0–3	(Greece) Olympiacos	0–2	0–1
Red Bull Salzburg (Austria)	1–5	(Israel) Maccabi Haifa	1–2	0–3
Ventspils (Latvia)	1–5	(Switzerland) Zürich	0–3	1–2
Copenhagen (Denmark)	2–3	(Cyprus) APOEL	1–0	1–3
Levski Sofia (Bulgaria)	1–4	(Hungary) Debrecen	1–2	0–2
Non-Champions Path
Lyon (France)	8–2	(Belgium) Anderlecht	5–1	3–1
Celtic (Scotland)	1–5	(England) Arsenal	0–2	1–3
Timișoara (Romania)	0–2	(Germany) VfB Stuttgart	0–2	0–0
Sporting CP (Portugal)	3–3 (a)	(Italy) Fiorentina	2–2	1–1
Panathinaikos (Greece)	2–5	(Spain) Atlético Madrid	2–3	0–2

=== Champions Path matches ===
18 August 2009
20:45

Sheriff Tiraspol (Moldova)	0–2	(Greece) Olympiacos
	Report	Dudu 46'; Mitroglou 81'

Sheriff Stadium, Tiraspol
Attendance: 12,500
Referee: Martin Atkinson (England)
26 August 2009
20:45

Olympiacos (Greece)	1–0	(Moldova) Sheriff Tiraspol
Mitroglou 82'	Report

Karaiskakis Stadium, Piraeus
Attendance: 27,633
Referee: Alberto Undiano Mallenco (Spain)

Olympiacos won 3–0 on aggregate.

19 August 2009
20:45

Red Bull Salzburg (Austria)	1–2	(Israel) Maccabi Haifa
Zickler 57'	Report	Ghadir 22'; Arbeitman 84'

Red Bull Arena, Wals-Siezenheim
Attendance: 21,260
Referee: Yuri Baskakov (Russia)
25 August 2009
20:45

Maccabi Haifa (Israel)	3–0	(Austria) Red Bull Salzburg
Dvalishvili 31'; Golasa 57'; Ghadir 90'	Report

Ramat Gan Stadium, Ramat Gan (Note: Played in Ramat Gan at Ramat Gan Stadium as Maccabi Haifa's Kiryat Eliezer Stadium did not meet UEFA criteria.)
Attendance: 31,700
Referee: Bertrand Layec (France)

Maccabi Haifa won 5–1 on aggregate.

19 August 2009
20:45

Ventspils (Latvia)	0–3	(Switzerland) Zürich
	Report	Vonlanthen 12'; Aegerter 55'; Djuric 75'

Skonto Stadium, Riga (Note: Played in Riga at Skonto Stadium as Ventspils' Ventspils Olimpiskais Stadions did not meet UEFA criteria.)
Attendance: 7,300
Referee: Tom Henning Øvrebø (Norway)
25 August 2009
20:45

Zürich (Switzerland)	2–1	(Latvia) Ventspils
Vonlanthen 6'; Abdi 90+2'	Report	Țîgîrlaș 8'

AFG Arena, St. Gallen (Note: Played in St. Gallen at AFG Arena as Zürich's Letzigrund hosted IAAF Golden League's fourth part (Weltklasse Zürich) on 28 August 2009.)
Attendance: 9,050
Referee: Terje Hauge (Norway)

Zürich won 5–1 on aggregate.

18 August 2009
20:45

Copenhagen (Denmark)	1–0	(Cyprus) APOEL
Pospěch 54'	Report

Parken Stadium, Copenhagen
Attendance: 16,250
Referee: Alain Hamer (Luxembourg)
26 August 2009
20:45

APOEL (Cyprus)	3–1	(Denmark) Copenhagen
Kosowski 2'; Michael 18' (pen.), 41'	Report	N'Doye 22'

GSP Stadium, Nicosia
Attendance: 21,133
Referee: Konrad Plautz (Austria)

APOEL won 3–2 on aggregate.

19 August 2009
20:45

Levski Sofia (Bulgaria)	1–2	(Hungary) Debrecen
Bardon 51'	Report	Bodnár 12'; Czvitkovics 76'

Georgi Asparuhov Stadium, Sofia
Attendance: 14,524
Referee: Laurent Duhamel (France)
25 August 2009
20:45

Debrecen (Hungary)	2–0	(Bulgaria) Levski Sofia
Varga 13'; Rudolf 35'	Report

Ferenc Puskás Stadium, Budapest (Note: Played in Budapest at Ferenc Puskás Stadium as Debrecen's Stadion Oláh Gábor Út did not meet UEFA criteria.)
Attendance: 32,000
Referee: Claus Bo Larsen (Denmark)

Debrecen won 4–1 on aggregate.

=== Non-Champions Path matches ===
19 August 2009
20:45

Lyon (France)	5–1	(Belgium) Anderlecht
Pjanić 10'; López 15' (pen.); Bastos 39'; Gomis 42', 63'	Report	Suárez 58'

Stade de Gerland, Lyon
Attendance: 37,902
Referee: Wolfgang Stark (Germany)
25 August 2009
20:45

Anderlecht (Belgium)	1–3	(France) Lyon
Suárez 51' (pen.)	Report	Lisandro 26', 32', 41'

Constant Vanden Stock Stadium, Brussels
Attendance: 16,096
Referee: Nicola Rizzoli (Italy)

Lyon won 8–2 on aggregate.

18 August 2009
20:45

Celtic (Scotland)	0–2	(England) Arsenal
	Report	Gallas 43'; Caldwell 71' (o.g.)

Celtic Park, Glasgow
Attendance: 58,165
Referee: Massimo Busacca (Switzerland)
26 August 2009
20:45

Arsenal (England)	3–1	(Scotland) Celtic
Eduardo 28' (pen.); Eboué 53'; Arshavin 74'	Report	Donati 90+2'

Emirates Stadium, London
Attendance: 59,962
Referee: Manuel Mejuto González (Spain)

Arsenal won 5–1 on aggregate.

18 August 2009
20:45

Timișoara (Romania)	0–2	(Germany) VfB Stuttgart
	Report	Gebhart 28' (pen.); Hleb 30'

Stadionul Dan Păltinișanu, Timișoara
Attendance: 23,446
Referee: Olegário Benquerença (Portugal)
26 August 2009
20:45

VfB Stuttgart (Germany)	0–0	(Romania) Timișoara
	Report

Mercedes-Benz Arena, Stuttgart
Attendance: 27,500
Referee: Roberto Rosetti (Italy)

VfB Stuttgart won 2–0 on aggregate.

18 August 2009
20:45

Sporting CP (Portugal)	2–2	(Italy) Fiorentina
Vukčević 58'; Veloso 66'	Report	Vargas 6'; Gilardino 79'

Estádio José Alvalade, Lisbon
Attendance: 27,602
Referee: Viktor Kassai (Hungary)
26 August 2009
20:45

Fiorentina (Italy)	1–1	(Portugal) Sporting CP
Jovetić 54'	Report	Moutinho 35'

Stadio Artemio Franchi, Florence
Attendance: 30,821
Referee: Howard Webb (England)

3–3 on aggregate; Fiorentina won on away goals.

19 August 2009
20:45

Panathinaikos (Greece)	2–3	(Spain) Atlético Madrid
Salpingidis 47'; Leto 74'	Report	Rodríguez 36'; Forlán 63'; Agüero 70'

Olympic Stadium, Athens
Attendance: 50,540
Referee: Felix Brych (Germany)
25 August 2009
20:45

Atlético Madrid (Spain)	2–0	(Greece) Panathinaikos
Vyntra 4' (o.g.); Agüero 83'	Report

Vicente Calderón, Madrid
Attendance: 29,910
Referee: Pieter Vink (Netherlands)

Atlético Madrid won 5–2 on aggregate.
