= Emerson (footballer, born 1972) =

Brazilian footballer (born 1972)

Personal information
- Full name: Emerson Moisés Costa
- Date of birth: 12 April 1972 (age 54)
- Place of birth: Rio de Janeiro, Brazil
- Height: 1.83 m (6 ft 0 in)
- Position: Defensive midfielder

Senior career*
Years	Team	Apps	(Gls)
1990–1992	Flamengo	0	(0)
1992	Coritiba	0	(0)
1992–1994	Belenenses	85	(2)
1994–1996	Porto	60	(9)
1996–1998	Middlesbrough	41	(8)
1998–2000	Tenerife	86	(4)
2000–2002	Deportivo La Coruña	43	(0)
2002–2003	Atlético Madrid	29	(2)
2003–2004	Rangers	14	(0)
2004–2005	Vasco da Gama	12	(0)
2005–2006	Skoda Xanthi	16	(1)
2006–2007	AEK Athens	30	(1)
2007	APOEL	13	(0)
2008	Madureira	0	(0)
Total		429	(23)
- * Club domestic league appearances and goals

Emerson Moisés Costa (born 12 April 1972), known simply as Emerson, is a Brazilian retired professional footballer who played as a defensive midfielder.

As well as in his country, he played professionally in Portugal, England, Spain and Scotland. He also received Portuguese citizenship, after he married his Portuguese wife.

== Club career ==
Born in Rio de Janeiro, Emerson started playing with Flamengo, but he soon moved to Coritiba in search of first-team football. In 1991 he began his extensive overseas spell, first with C.F. Os Belenenses in Portugal.

After several impressive displays, Emerson secured a move to FC Porto. Under the management of former England coach Bobby Robson, he won successive Primeira Liga titles, appeared in the UEFA Champions League and won the 1996 Portuguese Player of the Year award.

By now, Emerson's performances had attracted interest from major European clubs, and eventually he signed with Premier League side Middlesbrough, completing a £4 million move. It is alleged that the deal was done without manager Bryan Robson's knowledge, the manager only finding out after it was unwittingly mentioned by chief scout Ray Trainn; Emerson's cousin, Fabio Moreira was also acquired, but played just one game in his 14-month spell.

However, things turned sour quickly with Emerson's former manager Bobby Robson, at Barcelona, expressing his interest in bringing the player to the Camp Nou – this unsettled the midfielder, who by this time had already endured relegation to Division One in addition to difficulties in adjusting to life on Teesside. He travelled to Brazil for a break at the end of 1997, and once there threatened that he would not return to the club.

Eventually the dispute was resolved with a move to CD Tenerife in January 1998, for around £4.25 million. Surprisingly, Middlesbrough chief executive Keith Lamb later stated that he had tried to re-sign Emerson after Tenerife were relegated, and the latter remained in the Canary Islands until 2000 when he moved to Deportivo de La Coruña, after the Galicians' 2000 conquest of the La Liga title. He often partnered compatriot Mauro Silva in his first year, but played sparingly in the following.

After further one-year stints with Atlético Madrid and Rangers, where he became the first ever Brazilian to play for the Scottish club, scoring once against Panathinaikos in the 2003–04 Champions League.

In the summer of 2005 Emerson moved to Greece, joining Skoda Xanthi. After having stayed there only six months, on 23 January 2006 he was transferred to AEK Athens for a fee of €150,000. On 21 November 2006, he played the whole match in the 1–0 victory against the eventual champions, Milan for the UEFA Champions League.

On 23 June 2007, his contract with AEK was expired and Emerson signed for the Cypriot First Division champions APOEL. However, in January of the following year, he returned to Brazil and ended his career playing for lowly Madureira Esporte Clube, at the Rio de Janeiro State League.

== In pop culture ==
Emerson is widely known in Hungary, due to an infamous interview with his former teammate Péter Lipcsei, who referred to Emerson as "black Emerson".

== Honours ==
Porto

- Primeira Liga: 1994–95, 1995–96

Middlesbrough

- FA Cup runner-up: 1996–97
- Football League Cup runner-up: 1996–97
