= Rodrigo Moreira =

Rodrigo Moreira may refer to:

- Rodrigo Moreira (director) (born 1983), Ecuadorian model and beauty pageant winner
- Rodrigo Moreira (footballer, born 1996), Argentine footballer
- Rodrigo Moreira (footballer, born 2001), Uruguayan footballer
