= Pedro Moreira =

Pedro Moreira may refer to:

- Pedro Moreira (football manager) (born 1975), Portuguese football manager for Casa Pia
- Pedro Moreira (footballer, born 1983), Portuguese football defender
- Pedro Moreira (Cape Verdean footballer) (born 1983), Cape Verdean football forward
- Pedro Moreira (footballer, born 1989), Portuguese football midfielder
