= João Moreira =

João Moreira may refer to:

- João Moreira (footballer, born 1970), Portuguese former footballer who played for Swansea City
- João Moreira (footballer, born 1986), Portuguese footballer who last played in South Africa
- João Moreira (footballer, born 1998), Portuguese footballer who plays for S.C. Freamunde
- João Moreira (footballer, born 2004), Brazilian-born Portuguese footballer who plays for São Paulo
- João Moreira (jockey) (born 1983), Brazilian jockey
