= Moreira =

Moreira may refer to:

== Places ==
- Moreira (Maia), a parish in Maia Municipality, northern Portugal
- Moreira (Monção), a parish in Monção Municipality, northern Portugal
- Moreira (Nelas), a parish in Nelas Municipality, central Portugal

== People ==
- Moreira (name), given name and surname, including a list of people with the name
