= 2009–10 UEFA Champions League =

European football tournament

- The Santiago Bernabéu Stadium in Madrid hosted the final

Tournament details
- Dates: Qualifying: 30 June – 26 August 2009; Competition proper: 15 September 2009 – 22 May 2010
- Teams: Competition proper: 32; Total: 76 (from 52 associations)

Final positions
- Champions: (Italy) Inter Milan (3rd title)
- Runners-up: (Germany) Bayern Munich

Tournament statistics
- Matches played: 125
- Goals scored: 318 (2.54 per match)
- Attendance: 5,193,947 (41,552 per match)
- Top scorer(s): Lionel Messi (Barcelona); 8 goals

The 2009–10 UEFA Champions League was the 55th season of Europe's premier club football tournament organised by UEFA, and the 18th under the current UEFA Champions League format. The final was played on 22 May 2010 at the Santiago Bernabéu Stadium in Madrid, Spain, the first time the final was played on a Saturday. The final was won by Italian club Inter Milan, who beat German side Bayern Munich 2–0.

Inter Milan went on to represent Europe in the 2010 FIFA Club World Cup, beating Congolese side TP Mazembe 3–0 in the final, and played in the 2010 UEFA Super Cup against Europa League winners Atlético Madrid, losing 2–0.

Barcelona were the defending champions, but they were eliminated by eventual winners Inter Milan in the semi-finals.

== Association team allocation ==
A total of 76 teams participated in the 2009–10 Champions League, from 52 UEFA associations (Liechtenstein organises no domestic league competition). Associations were allocated places according to their 2008 UEFA country coefficient, which took into account their performance in European competitions from 2003–04 to 2007–08.

Below is the qualification scheme for the 2009–10 UEFA Champions League:

- Associations 1–3 each had four teams qualify
- Associations 4–6 each had three teams qualify
- Associations 7–15 each had two teams qualify
- Associations 16–53 each had one team qualify (except Liechtenstein)

=== Association ranking ===
Rank	Association	Coeff.	Teams
1	England	75.749	4
2	Spain	75.266	4
3	Italy	60.410	4
4	France	52.668	3
5	Germany	48.722	3
6	Russia	43.750	3
7	Romania	40.599	2
8	Portugal	39.927	2
9	Netherlands	38.213	2
10	Scotland	33.375	2
11	Turkey	31.725	2
12	Ukraine	30.100	2
13	Belgium	26.700	2
14	Greece	25.831	2
15	Czech Republic	25.750	2
16	Switzerland	24.225	1
17	Bulgaria	23.166	1
18	Norway	22.425	1

Rank	Association	Coeff.	Teams
19	Denmark	20.450	1
20	Austria	17.700	1
21	Serbia	16.750	1
22	Israel	15.750	1
23	Sweden	13.691	1
24	Slovakia	12.332	1
25	Poland	12.041	1
26	Hungary	11.999	1
27	Croatia	11.624	1
28	Cyprus	10.082	1
29	Slovenia	9.915	1
30	Finland	9.623	1
31	Latvia	8.831	1
32	Bosnia and Herzegovina	8.498	1
33	Lithuania	7.999	1
34	Moldova	7.499	1
35	Republic of Ireland	7.332	1
36	Macedonia	6.331	1

Rank	Association	Coeff.	Teams
37	Iceland	5.999	1
38	Georgia	5.831	1
39	Liechtenstein	5.500	0
40	Belarus	5.332	1
41	Estonia	4.332	1
42	Azerbaijan	3.832	1
43	Albania	3.666	1
44	Armenia	3.665	1
45	Kazakhstan	2.582	1
46	Northern Ireland	2.332	1
47	Wales	2.331	1
48	Faroe Islands	1.832	1
49	Luxembourg	1.498	1
50	Malta	0.832	1
51	Montenegro	0.500	1
52	Andorra	0.500	1
53	San Marino	0.250	1

=== Distribution ===
Since the winners of the 2008–09 UEFA Champions League, Barcelona, obtained a place in the group stage through their domestic league placing, the reserved title holder spot in the group stage was effectively vacated. To compensate:

- The champions of association 13 (Belgium) were promoted from the third qualifying round to the group stage.
- The champions of association 16 (Switzerland) were promoted from the second qualifying round to the third qualifying round.
- The champions of associations 48 and 49 (Faroe Islands and Luxembourg) were promoted from the first qualifying round to the second qualifying round.

		Teams entering in this round	Teams advancing from previous round
First qualifying round (4 teams)		4 champions from associations 50–53	
Second qualifying round (34 teams)		32 champions from associations 17–49 (except Liechtenstein)	2 winners from the first qualifying round
Third qualifying round	Champions (20 teams)	3 champions from associations 14–16	17 winners from the second qualifying round
Third qualifying round	Non-champions (10 teams)	9 runners-up from associations 7–15; 1 third-placed team from association 6	
Play-off round	Champions (10 teams)		10 winners from the third qualifying round for champions
Play-off round	Non-champions (10 teams)	2 third-placed teams from associations 4 and 5; 3 fourth-placed teams from associations 1–3	5 winners from the third qualifying round for non-champions
Group stage (32 teams)		13 champions from associations 1–13; 6 runners-up from associations 1–6; 3 third-placed teams from associations 1–3	5 winners from the play-off round for champions; 5 winners from the play-off round for non-champions
Knockout phase (16 teams)			8 group winners from the group stage; 8 group runners-up from the group stage

=== Teams ===
The labels in the parentheses show how each team qualified for the place of its starting round:

- TH: Champions League title holders
- 1st, 2nd, 3rd, 4th: League positions of the previous season

Group stage
(Spain) Barcelona (1st)^{TH}	(Italy) Inter Milan (1st)	(Germany) Bayern Munich (2nd)	(Netherlands) AZ (1st)
(England) Manchester United (1st)	(Italy) Juventus (2nd)	(Russia) Rubin Kazan (1st)	(Scotland) Rangers (1st)
(England) Liverpool (2nd)	(Italy) AC Milan (3rd)	(Russia) CSKA Moscow (2nd)	(Turkey) Beşiktaş (1st)
(England) Chelsea (3rd)	(France) Bordeaux (1st)	(Romania) Unirea Urziceni (1st)	(Ukraine) Dynamo Kyiv (1st)
(Spain) Real Madrid (2nd)	(France) Marseille (2nd)	(Portugal) Porto (1st)	(Belgium) Standard Liège (1st)
(Spain) Sevilla (3rd)	(Germany) VfL Wolfsburg (1st)		
Play-off round
Champions	Non-champions		
	(England) Arsenal (4th)	(Italy) Fiorentina (4th)	(Germany) VfB Stuttgart (3rd)
	(Spain) Atlético Madrid (4th)	(France) Lyon (3rd)	
Third qualifying round
Champions	Non-champions		
(Greece) Olympiacos (1st)	(Russia) Dynamo Moscow (3rd)	(Scotland) Celtic (2nd)	(Belgium) Anderlecht (2nd)
(Czech Republic) Slavia Prague (1st)	(Romania) Timișoara (2nd)	(Turkey) Sivasspor (2nd)	(Greece) Panathinaikos (2nd)
(Switzerland) Zürich (1st)	(Portugal) Sporting CP (2nd)	(Ukraine) Shakhtar Donetsk (2nd)	(Czech Republic) Sparta Prague (2nd)
	(Netherlands) Twente (2nd)		
Second qualifying round
(Bulgaria) Levski Sofia (1st)	(Poland) Wisła Kraków (1st)	(Lithuania) Ekranas (1st)	(Azerbaijan) Baku (1st)
(Norway) Stabæk (1st)	(Hungary) Debrecen (1st)	(Moldova) Sheriff Tiraspol (1st)	(Albania) Tirana (1st)
(Denmark) Copenhagen (1st)	(Croatia) Dinamo Zagreb (1st)	(Republic of Ireland) Bohemians (1st)	(Armenia) Pyunik (1st)
(Austria) Red Bull Salzburg (1st)	(Cyprus) APOEL (1st)	(North Macedonia) Makedonija GP (1st)	(Kazakhstan) Aktobe (1st)
(Serbia) Partizan (1st)	(Slovenia) Maribor (1st)	(Iceland) FH (1st)	(Northern Ireland) Glentoran (1st)
(Israel) Maccabi Haifa (1st)	(Finland) Inter Turku (1st)	(Georgia (country)) WIT Georgia (1st)	(Wales) Rhyl (1st)
(Sweden) Kalmar FF (1st)	(Latvia) Ventspils (1st)	(Belarus) BATE Borisov (1st)	(Faroe Islands) EB/Streymur (1st)
(Slovakia) Slovan Bratislava (1st)	(Bosnia and Herzegovina) Zrinjski Mostar (1st)	(Estonia) Levadia Tallinn (1st)	(Luxembourg) F91 Dudelange (1st)
First qualifying round
(Malta) Hibernians (1st)	(Montenegro) Mogren (1st)	(Andorra) Sant Julià (1st)	(San Marino) Tre Fiori (1st)

== Round and draw dates ==
All draws held at UEFA headquarters in Nyon, Switzerland unless stated otherwise.

Phase	Round	Draw date	First leg	Second leg
Qualifying	First qualifying round	22 June 2009	30 June – 1 July 2009	7–8 July 2009
Qualifying	Second qualifying round	22 June 2009	14–15 July 2009	21–22 July 2009
Qualifying	Third qualifying round	17 July 2009	28–29 July 2009	4–5 August 2009
Play-off	Play-off round	7 August 2009	18–19 August 2009	25–26 August 2009
Group stage	Matchday 1	27 August 2009 (Monaco)	15–16 September 2009	
Group stage	Matchday 2	27 August 2009 (Monaco)	29–30 September 2009	
Group stage	Matchday 3	27 August 2009 (Monaco)	20–21 October 2009	
Group stage	Matchday 4	27 August 2009 (Monaco)	3–4 November 2009	
Group stage	Matchday 5	27 August 2009 (Monaco)	24–25 November 2009	
Group stage	Matchday 6	27 August 2009 (Monaco)	8–9 December 2009	
Knockout phase	Round of 16	18 December 2009	16–17 & 23–24 February 2010	9–10 & 16–17 March 2010
Knockout phase	Quarter-finals	19 March 2010	30–31 March 2010	6–7 April 2010
Knockout phase	Semi-finals	19 March 2010	20–21 April 2010	27–28 April 2010
Knockout phase	Final	19 March 2010	22 May 2010 at Santiago Bernabéu Stadium, Madrid	

== Qualifying rounds ==
In a new system for the Champions League, there were two separate qualifying tournaments. The Champions Path (which started from the first qualifying round) was for clubs which won their domestic league and did not automatically qualify for the group stage, while the Non-Champions Path (which started from the third qualifying round) was for clubs which did not win their domestic league and did not automatically qualify for the group stage.

In the qualifying phase and the play-off round, teams played against each other over two legs on a home-and-away basis.

The draw for the first and second qualifying rounds, conducted by UEFA President Michel Platini and UEFA General Secretary David Taylor, was held on 22 June 2009, and the draw for the third qualifying round, conducted by UEFA Competitions Director Giorgio Marchetti and Head of Club Competitions Michael Heselschwerdt, was held on 17 July 2009. For the draws, clubs were separated into seeded and unseeded teams based on their club coefficient. Because the draws for the second and third qualifying rounds took place before the previous round was completed, the teams were seeded assuming the seeded side in the previous round would be victorious.

=== First qualifying round ===
The first legs were played on 30 June and 1 July, and the second legs were played on 7 and 8 July 2009.

Team 1	Agg.	Team 2	1st leg	2nd leg
Tre Fiori (San Marino)	2–2 (4–5 p) (Note: Order of legs switched after original draw.)	(Andorra) Sant Julià	1–1	1–1 (a.e.t.)
Hibernians (Malta)	0–6	(Montenegro) Mogren	0–2	0–4

=== Second qualifying round ===
The first legs were played on 14 and 15 July, and the second legs were played on 21 and 22 July 2009.

Partizan's 8–0 win over Rhyl in the second leg equalled the record for the largest margin of victory in the current Champions League format.

As of November 2009, the second leg between Stabæk and Tirana was under investigation by UEFA and German authorities for possible match-fixing.

Team 1	Agg.	Team 2	1st leg	2nd leg
Tirana (Albania)	1–5	(Norway) Stabæk	1–1	0–4
WIT Georgia (Georgia (country))	1–3	(Slovenia) Maribor	0–0	1–3
EB/Streymur (Faroe Islands)	0–5	(Cyprus) APOEL	0–2	0–3
Copenhagen (Denmark)	12–0	(Montenegro) Mogren	6–0	6–0
Debrecen (Hungary)	3–3 (a)	(Sweden) Kalmar FF	2–0	1–3
Makedonija GP (North Macedonia)	0–4	(Belarus) BATE Borisov	0–2	0–2
FH (Iceland)	0–6	(Kazakhstan) Aktobe	0–4	0–2
Pyunik (Armenia)	0–3	(Croatia) Dinamo Zagreb	0–0	0–3
Ventspils (Latvia)	6–1	(Luxembourg) F91 Dudelange	3–0	3–1
Ekranas (Lithuania)	4–6	(Azerbaijan) Baku	2–2	2–4
Red Bull Salzburg (Austria)	2–1	(Republic of Ireland) Bohemians	1–1	1–0
Zrinjski Mostar (Bosnia and Herzegovina)	1–4	(Slovakia) Slovan Bratislava	1–0	0–4
Inter Turku (Finland)	0–2	(Moldova) Sheriff Tiraspol	0–1	0–1
Rhyl (Wales)	0–12	(Serbia) Partizan	0–4	0–8
Wisła Kraków (Poland)	1–2	(Estonia) Levadia Tallinn	1–1	0–1
Levski Sofia (Bulgaria)	9–0	(Andorra) Sant Julià	4–0	5–0
Maccabi Haifa (Israel)	10–0	(Northern Ireland) Glentoran	6–0	4–0

=== Third qualifying round ===
The third qualifying round was split into two separate sections: one for champions and one for non-champions. The first legs were played on 28 and 29 July, and the second legs were played on 4 and 5 August 2009. The losing teams in both sections entered the play-off round of the 2009–10 UEFA Europa League.

Team 1	Agg.	Team 2	1st leg	2nd leg
Champions Path
Red Bull Salzburg (Austria)	3–2	(Croatia) Dinamo Zagreb	1–1	2–1
Slovan Bratislava (Slovakia)	0–4	(Greece) Olympiacos	0–2	0–2
Zürich (Switzerland)	5–3	(Slovenia) Maribor	2–3	3–0
APOEL (Cyprus)	2–1	(Serbia) Partizan	2–0	0–1
Sheriff Tiraspol (Moldova)	1–1 (a)	(Czech Republic) Slavia Prague	0–0	1–1
Aktobe (Kazakhstan)	3–4	(Israel) Maccabi Haifa	0–0	3–4
Baku (Azerbaijan)	0–2	(Bulgaria) Levski Sofia	0–0	0–2
Ventspils (Latvia)	2–2 (a)	(Belarus) BATE Borisov	1–0	1–2
Levadia Tallinn (Estonia)	0–2	(Hungary) Debrecen	0–1	0–1
Copenhagen (Denmark)	3–1	(Norway) Stabæk	3–1	0–0
Non-Champions Path
Sparta Prague (Czech Republic)	3–4	(Greece) Panathinaikos	3–1	0–3
Shakhtar Donetsk (Ukraine)	2–2 (a)	(Romania) Timișoara	2–2	0–0
Sporting CP (Portugal)	1–1 (a)	(Netherlands) Twente	0–0	1–1
Celtic (Scotland)	2–1	(Russia) Dynamo Moscow	0–1	2–0
Anderlecht (Belgium)	6–3	(Turkey) Sivasspor	5–0	1–3

== Play-off round ==
An extra qualifying round, the play-off round, was introduced from this season. The teams were split into two separate sections: one for champions and one for non-champions. The draw for the play-off round, conducted by UEFA General Secretary David Taylor and UEFA Competitions Director Giorgio Marchetti, was held on 7 August 2009. For the draw, clubs were separated into seeded and unseeded teams based on their club coefficient. The first legs were played on 18 and 19 August, and the second legs were played on 25 and 26 August 2009. The losing teams in both sections entered the group stage of the 2009–10 UEFA Europa League.

Team 1	Agg.	Team 2	1st leg	2nd leg
Champions Path
Sheriff Tiraspol (Moldova)	0–3	(Greece) Olympiacos	0–2	0–1
Red Bull Salzburg (Austria)	1–5	(Israel) Maccabi Haifa	1–2	0–3
Ventspils (Latvia)	1–5	(Switzerland) Zürich	0–3	1–2
Copenhagen (Denmark)	2–3	(Cyprus) APOEL	1–0	1–3
Levski Sofia (Bulgaria)	1–4	(Hungary) Debrecen	1–2	0–2
Non-Champions Path
Lyon (France)	8–2	(Belgium) Anderlecht	5–1	3–1
Celtic (Scotland)	1–5	(England) Arsenal	0–2	1–3
Timișoara (Romania)	0–2	(Germany) VfB Stuttgart	0–2	0–0
Sporting CP (Portugal)	3–3 (a)	(Italy) Fiorentina	2–2	1–1
Panathinaikos (Greece)	2–5	(Spain) Atlético Madrid	2–3	0–2

== Group stage ==
Location of teams of the 2009–10 UEFA Champions League group stage.
Brown: Group A; Red: Group B; Orange: Group C; Yellow: Group D;
Green: Group E; Blue: Group F; Purple: Group G; Pink: Group H.

The draw for the group stage was held at the Grimaldi Forum in Monaco on 27 August 2009. A total of 32 teams were drawn into eight groups of four. Teams were divided into four pots, based on their club coefficient. Clubs from the same pot or the same association cannot be drawn into the same group.

In each group, teams played against each other home-and-away. The matchdays were 15–16 September, 29–30 September, 20–21 October, 3–4 November, 24–25 November, and 8–9 December 2009. The top two in each group advanced to the knockout phase, and the third-placed teams entered the round of 32 of the 2009–10 UEFA Europa League.

Based on Article 7.06 in the UEFA regulations, if two or more teams were equal on points on completion of the group matches, the following criteria were applied to determine the rankings:

1. higher number of points obtained in the group matches played among the teams in question;
2. superior goal difference from the group matches played among the teams in question;
3. higher number of goals scored away from home in the group matches played among the teams in question;
4. superior goal difference from all group matches played;
5. higher number of goals scored;
6. higher number of coefficient points accumulated by the club in question, as well as its association, over the previous five seasons.

APOEL, AZ, Debrecen, Rubin Kazan, Standard Liège, VfL Wolfsburg, Unirea Urziceni and Zürich all made their debuts in the group stage.

=== Group A ===
Pos	Team	Pld	W	D	L	GF	GA	GD	Pts	Qualification	BOR	BAY	JUV	MHA
1	(France) Bordeaux	6	5	1	0	9	2	+7	16	Advance to knockout phase	—	2–1	2–0	1–0
2	(Germany) Bayern Munich	6	3	1	2	9	5	+4	10	Advance to knockout phase	0–2	—	0–0	1–0
3	(Italy) Juventus	6	2	2	2	4	7	−3	8	Transfer to Europa League	1–1	1–4	—	1–0
4	(Israel) Maccabi Haifa	6	0	0	6	0	8	−8	0		0–1	0–3	0–1	—

Source: RSSSF

=== Group B ===
Pos	Team	Pld	W	D	L	GF	GA	GD	Pts	Qualification	MUN	CSKA	WOL	BES
1	(England) Manchester United	6	4	1	1	10	6	+4	13	Advance to knockout phase	—	3–3	2–1	0–1
2	(Russia) CSKA Moscow	6	3	1	2	10	10	0	10	Advance to knockout phase	0–1	—	2–1	2–1
3	(Germany) VfL Wolfsburg	6	2	1	3	9	8	+1	7	Transfer to Europa League	1–3	3–1	—	0–0
4	(Turkey) Beşiktaş	6	1	1	4	3	8	−5	4		0–1	1–2	0–3	—

Source: RSSSF

=== Group C ===
Pos	Team	Pld	W	D	L	GF	GA	GD	Pts	Qualification	RMA	MIL	MAR	ZUR
1	(Spain) Real Madrid	6	4	1	1	15	7	+8	13	Advance to knockout phase	—	2–3	3–0	1–0
2	(Italy) Milan	6	2	3	1	8	7	+1	9	Advance to knockout phase	1–1	—	1–1	0–1
3	(France) Marseille	6	2	1	3	10	10	0	7	Transfer to Europa League	1–3	1–2	—	6–1
4	(Switzerland) Zürich	6	1	1	4	5	14	−9	4		2–5	1–1	0–1	—

Source: RSSSF

=== Group D ===
Pos	Team	Pld	W	D	L	GF	GA	GD	Pts	Qualification	CHE	POR	ATM	APO
1	(England) Chelsea	6	4	2	0	11	4	+7	14	Advance to knockout phase	—	1–0	4–0	2–2
2	(Portugal) Porto	6	4	0	2	8	3	+5	12	Advance to knockout phase	0–1	—	2–0	2–1
3	(Spain) Atlético Madrid	6	0	3	3	3	12	−9	3	Transfer to Europa League	2–2	0–3	—	0–0
4	(Cyprus) APOEL	6	0	3	3	4	7	−3	3		0–1	0–1	1–1	—

Source: RSSSF

=== Group E ===
Pos	Team	Pld	W	D	L	GF	GA	GD	Pts	Qualification	FIO	LYO	LIV	DEB
1	(Italy) Fiorentina	6	5	0	1	14	7	+7	15	Advance to knockout phase	—	1–0	2–0	5–2
2	(France) Lyon	6	4	1	1	12	3	+9	13	Advance to knockout phase	1–0	—	1–1	4–0
3	(England) Liverpool	6	2	1	3	5	7	−2	7	Transfer to Europa League	1–2	1–2	—	1–0
4	(Hungary) Debrecen	6	0	0	6	5	19	−14	0		3–4	0–4	0–1	—

Source: RSSSF

=== Group F ===
Pos	Team	Pld	W	D	L	GF	GA	GD	Pts	Qualification	BAR	INT	RUB	DKV
1	(Spain) Barcelona	6	3	2	1	7	3	+4	11	Advance to knockout phase	—	2–0	1–2	2–0
2	(Italy) Inter Milan	6	2	3	1	7	6	+1	9	Advance to knockout phase	0–0	—	2–0	2–2
3	(Russia) Rubin Kazan	6	1	3	2	4	7	−3	6	Transfer to Europa League	0–0	1–1	—	0–0
4	(Ukraine) Dynamo Kyiv	6	1	2	3	7	9	−2	5		1–2	1–2	3–1	—

Source: RSSSF

=== Group G ===
Pos	Team	Pld	W	D	L	GF	GA	GD	Pts	Qualification	SEV	STU	URZ	RAN
1	(Spain) Sevilla	6	4	1	1	11	4	+7	13	Advance to knockout phase	—	1–1	2–0	1–0
2	(Germany) VfB Stuttgart	6	2	3	1	9	7	+2	9	Advance to knockout phase	1–3	—	3–1	1–1
3	(Romania) Unirea Urziceni	6	2	2	2	8	8	0	8	Transfer to Europa League	1–0	1–1	—	1–1
4	(Scotland) Rangers	6	0	2	4	4	13	−9	2		1–4	0–2	1–4	—

Source: RSSSF

=== Group H ===
Pos	Team	Pld	W	D	L	GF	GA	GD	Pts	Qualification	ARS	OLY	STL	AZ
1	(England) Arsenal	6	4	1	1	12	5	+7	13	Advance to knockout phase	—	2–0	2–0	4–1
2	(Greece) Olympiacos	6	3	1	2	4	5	−1	10	Advance to knockout phase	1–0	—	2–1	1–0
3	(Belgium) Standard Liège	6	1	2	3	7	9	−2	5	Transfer to Europa League	2–3	2–0	—	1–1
4	(Netherlands) AZ	6	0	4	2	4	8	−4	4		1–1	0–0	1–1	—

Source: RSSSF

== Knockout phase ==
In the knockout phase, teams played against each other over two legs on a home-and-away basis, except for the one-match final. The mechanism of the draws for each round was as follows:

- In the draw for the round of 16, the eight group winners were seeded, and the eight group runners-up were unseeded. The seeded teams were drawn against the unseeded teams, with the seeded teams hosting the second leg. Teams from the same group or the same association could not be drawn against each other.
- In the draws for the quarter-finals and semi-finals, there were no seedings, and teams from the same group or the same association could be drawn against each other. As the draws for the quarter-finals and semi-finals were held together before the quarter-finals were played, the identity of the quarter-final winners was not known at the time of the semi-final draw. A draw was also held to determine which semi-final winner was designated as the "home" team for the final (for administrative purposes as it was played at a neutral venue).

=== Bracket ===
Round of 16
(Germany) Bayern Munich (a)	2	2	4
(Italy) Fiorentina	1	3	4
(Italy) Milan	2	0	2
(England) Manchester United	3	4	7
(France) Lyon	1	1	2
(Spain) Real Madrid	0	1	1
(Greece) Olympiacos	0	1	1
(France) Bordeaux	1	2	3
(Italy) Inter Milan	2	1	3
(England) Chelsea	1	0	1
(Russia) CSKA Moscow	1	2	3
(Spain) Sevilla	1	1	2
(Portugal) Porto	2	0	2
(England) Arsenal	1	5	6
(Germany) VfB Stuttgart	1	0	1
(Spain) Barcelona	1	4	5

Quarter-finals
(Germany) Bayern Munich (a)	2	2	4
(England) Manchester United	1	3	4
(France) Lyon	3	0	3
(France) Bordeaux	1	1	2
(Italy) Inter Milan	1	1	2
(Russia) CSKA Moscow	0	0	0
(England) Arsenal	2	1	3
(Spain) Barcelona	2	4	6

Semi-finals
(Germany) Bayern Munich	1	3	4
(France) Lyon	0	0	0
(Italy) Inter Milan	3	0	3
(Spain) Barcelona	1	1	2

Final
22 May – Madrid
(Germany) Bayern Munich	0
(Italy) Inter Milan	2

=== Round of 16 ===
The draw for the competition's round of 16 was held on 18 December 2009. Starting from this season, the matches in the round of 16 were held over a month, instead of the previous two weeks. The first legs were played on 16, 17, 23 and 24 February, and the second legs were played on 9, 10, 16 and 17 March 2010.

CSKA Moscow became the first Russian team to advance to the quarter-finals under the present format (16 teams in the knockout stage).

Team 1	Agg.	Team 2	1st leg	2nd leg
VfB Stuttgart (Germany)	1–5	(Spain) Barcelona	1–1	0–4
Olympiacos (Greece)	1–3	(France) Bordeaux	0–1	1–2
Inter Milan (Italy)	3–1	(England) Chelsea	2–1	1–0
Bayern Munich (Germany)	4–4 (a)	(Italy) Fiorentina	2–1	2–3
CSKA Moscow (Russia)	3–2	(Spain) Sevilla	1–1	2–1
Lyon (France)	2–1	(Spain) Real Madrid	1–0	1–1
Porto (Portugal)	2–6	(England) Arsenal	2–1	0–5
Milan (Italy)	2–7	(England) Manchester United	2–3	0–4

=== Quarter-finals ===
The draw for the quarter-finals took place on 19 March 2010. The first legs were played on 30 and 31 March, and the second legs were played on 6 and 7 April 2010.

Team 1	Agg.	Team 2	1st leg	2nd leg
Lyon (France)	3–2	(France) Bordeaux	3–1	0–1
Bayern Munich (Germany)	4–4 (a)	(England) Manchester United	2–1	2–3
Arsenal (England)	3–6	(Spain) Barcelona	2–2	1–4
Inter Milan (Italy)	2–0	(Russia) CSKA Moscow	1–0	1–0

=== Semi-finals ===
The draw for the semi-finals took place on 19 March 2010, immediately after the draw for the quarter-finals. The first legs were played on 20 and 21 April, and the second legs were played on 27 and 28 April 2010. There were fears that the first legs would have to be postponed due to the eruptions of the volcano at Eyjafjallajökull in Iceland. On 18 April, UEFA issued a statement that the matches would go ahead and that the teams would have to make alternate travel arrangements.

Team 1	Agg.	Team 2	1st leg	2nd leg
Bayern Munich (Germany)	4–0	(France) Lyon	1–0	3–0
Inter Milan (Italy)	3–2	(Spain) Barcelona	3–1	0–1

=== Final ===
The final was contested by Germany's Bayern Munich and Italy's Inter Milan. It was played on 22 May 2010 at the Santiago Bernabéu Stadium in Madrid, Spain. The stadium, home of Real Madrid, had hosted three previous European Cup finals, in 1957, 1969 and 1980. A draw was held on 19 March 2010, after the quarter-final and semi-final draws, to determine the "home" team for administrative purposes. It was the first time that a UEFA Champions League final was played on a Saturday night. England's Howard Webb was appointed to referee the final. The two clubs competing in the final had each won their domestic league and cup competitions, meaning that the winner would become only the sixth club in Europe to win a continental treble, and the first club from their respective countries. It was also the second consecutive treble, following that of Barcelona in the previous season.

22 May 2010
20:45 UTC+2

Bayern Munich (Germany)	0–2	(Italy) Inter Milan
	Report	Milito 35', 70'

Santiago Bernabéu, Madrid
Attendance: 73,490
Referee: Howard Webb (England)

== Statistics ==
Statistics exclude qualifying rounds and play-off round.

=== Top goalscorers ===
Rank	Player	Team	Goals	Minutes played
1	(Argentina) Lionel Messi	(Spain) Barcelona	8	1033
2	(Portugal) Cristiano Ronaldo	(Spain) Real Madrid	7	477
2	(Croatia) Ivica Olić	(Germany) Bayern Munich	7	721
4	(Argentina) Diego Milito	(Italy) Inter Milan	6	966
5	(Denmark) Nicklas Bendtner	(England) Arsenal	5	461
5	(England) Wayne Rooney	(England) Manchester United	5	508
5	(Morocco) Marouane Chamakh	(France) Bordeaux	5	852
8	(England) Michael Owen	(England) Manchester United	4	293
8	(Montenegro) Stevan Jovetić	(Italy) Fiorentina	4	302
8	(Bosnia and Herzegovina) Edin Džeko	(Germany) VfL Wolfsburg	4	560
8	(Spain) Cesc Fàbregas	(England) Arsenal	4	633
8	(Colombia) Radamel Falcao	(Portugal) Porto	4	660
8	(Spain) Pedro	(Spain) Barcelona	4	677
8	(Netherlands) Arjen Robben	(Germany) Bayern Munich	4	717
8	(Bosnia and Herzegovina) Miralem Pjanić	(France) Lyon	4	780
8	(Sweden) Zlatan Ibrahimović	(Spain) Barcelona	4	790
8	(Serbia) Miloš Krasić	(Russia) CSKA Moscow	4	812

=== Squad of the season ===
The UEFA technical team selected the following players as the squad of the tournament.

Pos.	Player	Team
GK	(Brazil) Júlio César	(Italy) Internazionale
GK	(Netherlands) Edwin van der Sar	(England) Manchester United
GK	(France) Hugo Lloris	(France) Lyon
DF	(Argentina) Javier Zanetti	(Italy) Internazionale
DF	(Brazil) Maicon	(Italy) Internazionale
DF	(Brazil) Lúcio	(Italy) Internazionale
DF	(Argentina) Walter Samuel	(Italy) Internazionale
DF	(France) Aly Cissokho	(France) Lyon
DF	(Brazil) Dani Alves	(Spain) Barcelona
MF	(Netherlands) Wesley Sneijder	(Italy) Internazionale
MF	(Argentina) Esteban Cambiasso	(Italy) Internazionale
MF	(Spain) Xavi	(Spain) Barcelona
MF	(Spain) Andrés Iniesta	(Spain) Barcelona
MF	(Germany) Bastian Schweinsteiger	(Germany) Bayern Munich
MF	(France) Yoann Gourcuff	(France) Lyon
FW	(Argentina) Diego Milito	(Italy) Internazionale
FW	(Cameroon) Samuel Eto'o	(Italy) Internazionale
FW	(Argentina) Lionel Messi	(Spain) Barcelona
FW	(Portugal) Cristiano Ronaldo	(Spain) Real Madrid
FW	(Netherlands) Arjen Robben	(Germany) Bayern Munich
FW	(Sweden) Zlatan Ibrahimović	(Spain) Barcelona

== See also ==
- 2009–10 UEFA Europa League
- 2010 FIFA Club World Cup
- 2010 UEFA Super Cup
- 2009–10 UEFA Women's Champions League
