= Moreira (footballer, born 1988) =

Portuguese footballer

Personal information
- Full name: João André Castro Moreira
- Date of birth: 22 April 1988 (age 38)
- Place of birth: Guimarães, Portugal
- Height: 1.75 m (5 ft 9 in)
- Position: Forward

Team information
- Current team: Pevidém

Youth career
- 2000–2001: Vitória Guimarães
- 2001–2002: Candoso de São Tiago
- 2002–2003: Vitória Guimarães
- 2003–2004: Candoso de São Tiago
- 2003–2004: Vizela
- 2003–2004: Caçadores das Taipas
- 2003–2004: Vianense

Senior career*
Years	Team	Apps	(Gls)
2007–2008	Chafé		
2008–2009	Valenciano		
2009–2010	Ponte da Barca		
2010–2011	Neves		
2011–2012	Varzim	27	(1)
2012–2013	Trofense	6	(0)
2013	Joane	13	(3)
2013–2014	Vizela	28	(6)
2014–2015	Felgueiras 1932	27	(2)
2015–2016	Vilaverdense	22	(1)
2016	Os Limianos	14	(1)
2017	Tirsense	15	(0)
2017–2018	Caçadores das Taipas	15	(0)
2015–2016	Barrosas	22	(1)
2015–2016	Pevidém	49	(5)
- * Club domestic league appearances and goals as of 5 September 2021

João André Castro Moreira (born 22 April 1988), known as Moreira, is a Portuguese footballer who plays for Pevidém as a forward.
