= Adriano Moreira (footballer) =

Portuguese footballer

Adriano
Personal information
- Full name: Adriano José Viana Moreira
- Date of birth: 30 January 1983 (age 43)
- Place of birth: Póvoa de Varzim, Portugal
- Height: 1.80 m (5 ft 11 in)
- Position: Goalkeeper

Youth career
- 1994–2002: Varzim

Senior career*
Years	Team	Apps	(Gls)
2002–2003	Cerveira		
2003–2004	Valenciano		
2004–2007	Rio Ave	3	(0)
2008	Pandurii	0	(0)
2008–2009	União Madeira	5	(0)
2009–2010	Valdevez	11	(0)
- * Club domestic league appearances and goals

Adriano José Viana Moreira (born 30 January 1983), known simply as Adriano, is a Portuguese retired footballer who played as a goalkeeper.

== Football career ==
Adriano was born in Póvoa de Varzim. After graduating from hometown Varzim SC's youth ranks, he started his senior career in amateur football, moving straight to the Primeira Liga two years after as he signed with Rio Ave FC.

However, Adriano's stay at Vila do Conde was not a happy one, has he only appeared in three league matches– nine overall – during three-and-a-half seasons (the last two spent in the second division), playing second-fiddle to Spaniard Miguel Mora.

In January 2008, Adriano was purchased by Romanian club CS Pandurii Târgu Jiu but, unsettled, returned to his country and joined C.F. União (third level). The following summer he stayed in that tier, moving to C.A. Valdevez.
