= Matteo Andreini =

Sammarinese footballer

Personal information
- Full name: Matteo Andreini
- Date of birth: 10 October 1981 (age 45)
- Place of birth: San Marino, San Marino
- Height: 1.78 m (5 ft 10 in)
- Position: Defender

Team information
- Current team: Tre Fiori
- Number: 20

Senior career*
Years	Team	Apps	(Gls)
2003–2004	Cailungo		
2004–2005	Libertas		
2005–2018	Tre Fiori	110	(23)

International career^{‡}
2005–2020	San Marino	21	(0)
- * Club domestic league appearances and goals ‡ National team caps and goals as of 18 July 2020

Matteo Andreini (born 10 October 1981) is a San Marinese footballer who formerly played for Tre Fiori and the San Marino national team.

Andreini was born in Borgo Maggiore, San Marino.
