= Jonathan Moreira (footballer, born 1996) =

Argentine professional footballer

Personal information
- Date of birth: 22 August 1996 (age 30)
- Place of birth: Argentina
- Height: 1.70 m (5 ft 7 in)
- Position: Midfielder

Team information
- Current team: Rivadavia

Youth career
- San Lorenzo
- Deportivo Español

Senior career*
Years	Team	Apps	(Gls)
2018–2019	Deportivo Español	1	(0)
2020–	Rivadavia	5	(0)
- * Club domestic league appearances and goals as of 18:14, 16 September 2020 (UTC)

Jonathan Moreira (born 22 August 1996) is an Argentine professional footballer who plays as a midfielder for Rivadavia.

== Career ==
Moreira progressed through the ranks of Deportivo Español. He was promoted into senior football in November 2018 by manager Pedro Catalano, subsequently appearing for his professional debut on 19 November during a 2–2 draw with Defensores Unidos in Primera B Metropolitana; replacing Cristian Vázquez after sixty-nine minutes. In January 2020, Moreira joined Torneo Regional Federal Amateur outfit Rivadavia.

== Career statistics ==
As of 16 September 2020.

Appearances and goals by club, season and competition
Club	Season	League			Cup		League Cup		Continental		Other		Total	
Club	Season	Division	Apps	Goals	Apps	Goals	Apps	Goals	Apps	Goals	Apps	Goals	Apps	Goals
Deportivo Español	2018–19	Primera B Metropolitana	1	0	0	0	—		—		0	0	1	0
Deportivo Español	2019–20	Primera C Metropolitana	0	0	0	0	—		—		0	0	0	0
Deportivo Español	Total		1	0	0	0	—		—		0	0	1	0
Rivadavia	2020	Torneo Amateur	5	0	0	0	—		—		0	0	5	0
Career total			6	0	0	0	—		—		0	0	6	0
