= Giacomo Benedettini =

Sanmarinese footballer

Personal information
- Full name: Giacomo Benedettini
- Date of birth: October 7, 1982 (age 44)
- Place of birth: San Marino
- Position: Defender

Team information
- Current team: S.P. Tre Fiori

Senior career*
Years	Team	Apps	(Gls)
2002–2018	S.P. Tre Fiori	113	(0)

International career^{‡}
2007–2013	San Marino	8	(0)
- * Club domestic league appearances and goals as of 18 July 2020 ‡ National team caps and goals as of 18 July 2020

Giacomo Benedettini (born 7 October 1982) is a former Sammarinese footballer who played for S.P. Tre Fiori and the San Marino national football team.
