= João Moreira (footballer, born 1970) =

Portuguese footballer

Personal information
- Full name: João Manuel da Silva Moreira
- Date of birth: 30 June 1970 (age 56)
- Place of birth: Porto, Portugal (Note: An alternative source suggests that Moreira was born in Angola.)
- Height: 1.78 m (5 ft 10 in)
- Position: Left-back

Youth career
- 1983–1987: Anadia FC
- 1986–1987: GD Mealhada
- 1987–1988: Anadia FC

Senior career*
Years	Team	Apps	(Gls)
1988–1993	Anadia FC		
1993–1994	AD Fafe		
1994–1995	União de Coimbra		
1995–1996	Nacional	4	(0)
1996–1998	Swansea City	15	(0)
1998–1999	SC São João de Ver	22	(2)
1999–2003	GD Mealhada		
- * Club domestic league appearances and goals

João Manuel da Silva Moreira (Portuguese pronunciation: [ʒuˈɐ̃w mɐnuˈɛl dɐ ˈsilvɐ muˈɾɐjɾɐ, ˈʒwɐ̃w -]; born 30 June 1970) is a Portuguese former professional footballer, who played as a defender for Swansea City in the Football League.

== Club career ==
In summer 1996 Swansea City manager Jan Mølby spent £50,000 to bring Moreira to the Welsh club, then languishing in the Third Division. It was reported that Moreira was a former Benfica player who had recently had a trial with Birmingham City. At Swansea Moreira lived with teammate Jason Price, near a group of students who had a Jacuzzi. The duo's off-field antics and excessive partying resulted in a rebuke from coach Alan Curtis. Quickly nicknamed "Joe" Moreira, a knee injury sustained in pre-season kept him out of the Swansea team until November 1996, when he played in a 1–0 win over Brighton. Huw Richards wrote in When Saturday Comes that "elegant but over-left-footed" Moreira became rated highly by supporters at the Vetch Field. Moreira played in the 1997 Football League Third Division play-off final, which Swansea lost 1–0 to an injury time goal from Northampton Town's John Frain. When Mølby was sacked as manager, Moreira fell out of favour. He was made available for transfer in November 1997 and released in summer 1998.
