= João Moreira (footballer, born 1998) =

Portuguese footballer

Personal information
- Full name: João Miguel Barbosa Moreira
- Date of birth: 2 March 1998 (age 28)
- Position: Left back

Team information
- Current team: Freamunde
- Number: 5

Youth career
- 2006–2009: FC Cristelo
- 2009–2017: Freamunde

Senior career*
| Years | Team | Apps | (Gls) |
| 2017– | Freamunde | 17 | (0) |
- * Club domestic league appearances and goals as of 11 March 2018

João Miguel Barbosa Moreira (born 2 March 1998) is a Portuguese professional footballer who plays for S.C. Freamunde as a defender.
