= Fabio Moreira =

Brazilian footballer (born 1972)

Personal information
- Full name: Fábio da Silva Moreira
- Date of birth: 14 March 1972 (age 54)
- Place of birth: Brazil
- Position: Defender

Senior career*
Years	Team	Apps	(Gls)
1993/1994	Vitória F.C.	2	(0)
1994/1995	S.C. Salgueiros	1	(0)
1995/1996	G.D. Chaves	2	(0)
1997/1998	Middlesbrough F.C.	1	(0)
2003/2004	Brandenburger SC Süd 05	13	(1)
- * Club domestic league appearances and goals

Fábio da Silva Moreira (born 14 March 1972 in Brazil) is a Brazilian retired footballer.
