= Pedro Moreira (footballer, born 1983) =

Portuguese footballer

Personal information
- Full name: Pedro António Coelho Moreira
- Date of birth: 23 October 1983 (age 43)
- Place of birth: Penafiel, Portugal
- Height: 1.77 m (5 ft 10 in)
- Position: Right-back

Youth career
- 1988–2002: Penafiel

Senior career*
Years	Team	Apps	(Gls)
2001–2009	Penafiel	154	(0)
2009–2019	Beira-Mar	224	(2)
Total		378	(2)
- * Club domestic league appearances and goals

Pedro António Coelho Moreira (born 23 October 1983) is a Portuguese former professional footballer who played as a right-back.

== Club career ==
Moreira was born in Penafiel, Porto District. He spent his entire 18-year senior career with F.C. Penafiel and S.C. Beira-Mar.

Over five seasons, Moreira appeared in 115 Primeira Liga games. He retired in 2019 at the age of 35, with Beira-Mar now in the Aveiro regional divisions due to financial problems; the captain was at one point the player with the most appearances for the club.
