= Víctor Moreira =

Andorran footballer

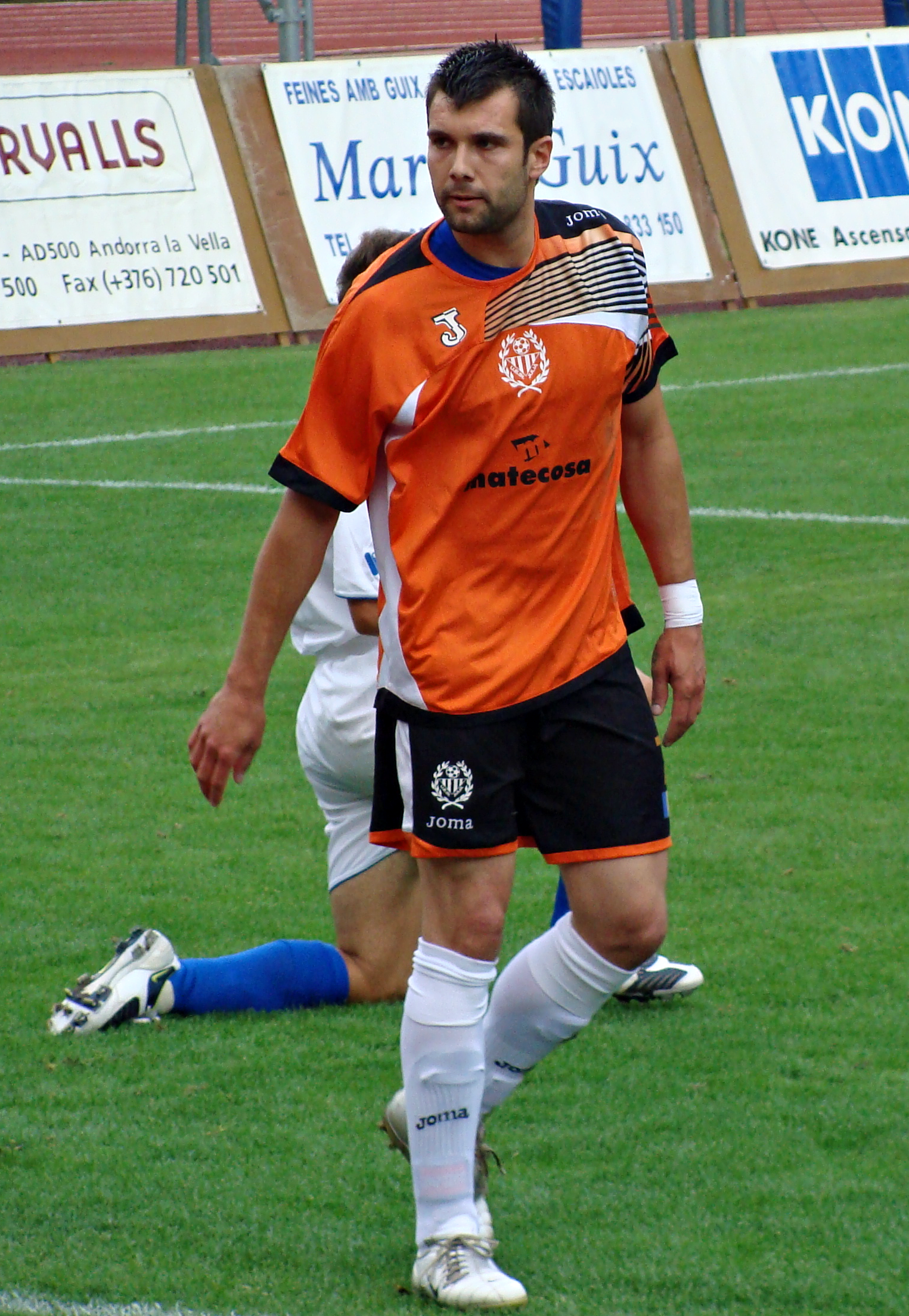

Personal information
- Full name: Víctor Hugo Moreira Teixeira
- Date of birth: 5 October 1982 (age 44)
- Position: Midfielder

Team information
- Current team: Sant Julià

Senior career*
Years	Team	Apps	(Gls)
2001–2002	Marco		
2002–2003	Torres Novas		
2003–2004	Alpendorada		
2004–2005	Rio Tinto		
2006–2009	Rànger's		
2009–2012	Sant Julià		
2012–2014	Lusitanos	23	(3)
2014–2017	FC Andorra	67	(5)
2017–2018	Santa Coloma	14	(1)
2018–2019	Engordany	17	(3)
2019–	Sant Julià	10	(2)

International career^{‡}
2008–	Andorra	16	(0)
- * Club domestic league appearances and goals as of 15 May 2016 ‡ National team caps and goals as of 6 September 2016

Víctor Hugo Moreira Teixeira (born 5 October 1982) is an Andorran international footballer who plays for FC Andorra, as a midfielder.

== Career ==
Moreira has played club football for FC Rànger's, UE Sant Julià and FC Lusitanos.

He made his international debut for Andorra in 2008.
