= Rodrigo Moreira (footballer, born 2001) =

Uruguayan footballer

Personal information
- Full name: Rodrigo Nahuel Moreira Lima
- Date of birth: 23 February 2001 (age 25)
- Place of birth: Pando, Argentina
- Position: Forward

Team information
- Current team: Rentistas

Youth career
- Rentistas

Senior career*
Years	Team	Apps	(Gls)
2018–	Rentistas	3	(0)

International career
- Uruguay U16
- * Club domestic league appearances and goals as of 15:11, 24 May 2018 (UTC)

Rodrigo Nahuel Moreira Lima (born 23 February 2001) is a Uruguayan professional footballer who plays as a forward for Uruguayan Segunda División side Rentistas.

== Career ==
=== Club ===
Moreira was promoted into the first-team of Rentistas in 2018, making his debut on 3 March in a Uruguayan Segunda División defeat away to Villa Teresa.

=== International ===
Moreira has played and scored for the Uruguay U16s at international level.

== Career statistics ==
As of 24 May 2018.

Club statistics
Club	Season	League			Cup		League Cup		Continental		Other		Total	
Club	Season	Division	Apps	Goals	Apps	Goals	Apps	Goals	Apps	Goals	Apps	Goals	Apps	Goals
Rentistas	2018	Segunda División	3	0	—		—		—		0	0	3	0
Career total			3	0	—		—		—		0	0	3	0
