= Pedro Moreira (Cape Verdean footballer) =

Cape Verdean footballer

Personal information
- Full name: Pedro Jorge Ramos Moreira
- Date of birth: 16 January 1983 (age 43)
- Place of birth: Lisbon, Portugal
- Height: 1.78 m (5 ft 10 in)
- Position: Forward

Youth career
- 1998–2000: Brejos Azeitão
- 2000–2002: Barreirense

Senior career*
Years	Team	Apps	(Gls)
2002–2006	Barreirense	71	(9)
2002–2003	→ 1º Maio Sarilhense (loan)		
2006–2008	União Leiria	0	(0)
2006–2007	→ Louletano (loan)	23	(2)
2007–2008	→ Fátima (loan)	28	(1)
2008–2010	Gloria Buzău	14	(0)
2009–2010	→ Fátima (loan)	12	(1)
2010–2011	Fátima	25	(5)
2011–2012	Estoril	20	(1)
2012–2013	Nea Salamina	11	(1)
2013	Naval	10	(0)
2013–2014	Atlético	32	(2)
2014–2015	Oliveirense	34	(2)
2015–2016	União Leiria	27	(2)
Total		307	(26)

International career
2009	Cape Verde	2	(0)
- * Club domestic league appearances and goals

Pedro Jorge Ramos Moreira (born 16 January 1983 in Lisbon) is a Cape Verdean former professional footballer who played as a forward.
