= 2018–19 Hapoel Haifa F.C. season =

Hapoel Haifa
2018–19 season
- Owner: Yoav Katz
- Chairman: Yoav Katz
- Manager: Nir Klinger (until 25 October 2018); Meir Ben Margi (interim); Sharon Mimer (from 31 October 2018 until 13 April 2019); Meir Ben Margi (interim); Haim Silvas (from 17 April 2019)
- Stadium: Sammy Ofer
- Ligat Ha'Al: 11th
- State Cup: Round of 32
- Super Cup: Winner
- Toto Cup: Semi final
- UEFA Europa League: Third qualifying round
- Top goalscorer: League: Ness Zamir (6); All: Ness Zamir (7)
- Biggest win: 5 - 0 (vs Maccabi Netanya, 25 August 2018)
- Biggest defeat: 1 - 4 (vs Atalanta, 9 August 2018)
| Home colours | Away colours | Third colours |

Hapoel Haifa Football Club is an Israeli football club located in Haifa. During the 2018–19 campaignthe club have competed in the Israeli Premier League, State Cup, Toto Cup, Super Cup, UEFA Europa League.

== Club ==
=== Kits ===
- Provider: Joma
- Main Sponsor: Bogart Men's Fashion
- Secondary Sponsor: Moked Hat'ama

| Home | Away | 3rd | 4th | GK 1 | GK 2 |

== First team ==
| No. | Pos. | Nation | Player |
|---|---|---|---|
| 1 | GK | ISR | Ran Kadoch |
| 2 | DF | SWE | Rasmus Sjöstedt |
| 3 | DF | ISR | Sean Goldberg |
| 4 | DF | ISR | Dor Malul (Vice-Captain) |
| 6 | MF | ISR | Gal Arel |
| 7 | MF | ISR | Shlomi Azulay |
| 8 | FW | ISR | Idan Shemesh |
| 9 | FW | ISR | Ben Azubel |
| 10 | FW | MDA | Radu Gînsari |
| 11 | MF | ISR | Ness Zamir |
| 13 | GK | LTU | Ernestas Šetkus |
| 14 | MF | ISR | Gil Vermouth (Captain) |
| 18 | DF | ISR | Hen Dilmoni |

| No. | Pos. | Nation | Player |
|---|---|---|---|
| 20 | FW | ISR | Dudu Biton |
| 21 | MF | ISR | Snir Talias |
| 23 | MF | ISR | Guy Hadida |
| 24 | DF | ISR | Liran Serdal |
| 26 | DF | ISR | Guy Mishpati |
| 29 | MF | ISR | Lior Berkovic |
| 30 | DF | ROU | Gabriel Tamaș |
| 39 | GK | ISR | Tal Hadar |
| 45 | FW | ISR | Matan Hozez |
| 51 | DF | MKD | Risto Mitrevski |
| 55 | DF | ISR | Nisso Kapiloto |
| 77 | FW | ISR | Almog Buzaglo |

== Transfers ==
=== Summer ===
In:

| No. | Pos. | Nation | Player |
|---|---|---|---|
| — | DF | ISR | Hen Dilmoni (from Beitar Jerusalem) |
| — | MF | ISR | Roei Shukrani (from Hapoel Ra'anana) |
| — | MF | ISR | Ness Zamir (from Hapoel Petah Tikva) |
| — | FW | ISR | Eli Elbaz (from (Greece) Apollon Smyrnis) |
| — | DF | ISR | Guy Mishpati (from Hapoel Marmorek) |
| — | MF | ISR | Guy Hadida (from Beitar Tel Aviv Ramla) |
| — | FW | GRE | Thanasis Papazoglou (from (Belgium) K.V. Kortrijk) |
| — | FW | ISR | Almog Buzaglo (from Bnei Yehuda Tel Aviv) |
| — | DF | ISR | Sean Goldberg (from Maccabi Tel Aviv) |
| — | FW | ISR | Ben Azubel (on loan from Hapoel Acre) |
| — | GK | ISR | Tal Hadar (from Hapoel Afula) |
| — | MF | ISR | Lior Berkovic (came from the youth group) |
| — | MF | ISR | Snir Talias (came from the youth group) |

Out:

| No. | Pos. | Nation | Player |
|---|---|---|---|
| — | DF | ISR | Samuel Scheimann (to Hapoel Be'er Sheva) |
| — | MF | ISR | Roslan Barsky (loan return to Maccabi Tel Aviv) |
| — | FW | ISR | Alon Turgeman (to Austria Wien) |
| — | FW | ISR | Aner Shechter (on loan to Hapoel Afula) |
| — | DF | ISR | Ofek Fishler (on loan to Hapoel Nazareth Illit) |
| — | FW | ISR | Idan Golan (released) |
| — | FW | ISR | Eden Ben Basat (to Hapoel Be'er Sheva) |
| — | FW | CRO | Josip Ivančić (to F.C. Ashdod) |
| — | FW | ISR | Sa'ar Fadida (on loan to Hapoel Rishon LeZion) |
| — | GK | ISR | Rotem Fadida (on loan to Maccabi Tzur Shalom) |
| — | DF | ISR | Haim Megrelashvili (released) |
| — | MF | ISR | Ido Vaier (released) |
| — | MF | ISR | Hisham Kiwan (to Hapoel Bnei Lod) |

=== Winter ===
In:

| No. | Pos. | Nation | Player |
|---|---|---|---|
| — | FW | ISR | Matan Hozez (on loan from Maccabi Tel Aviv) |
| — | FW | ISR | Idan Shemesh (from Sektzia Nes Tziona) |
| — | MF | ISR | Shlomi Azulay (on loan from Maccabi Haifa) |
| — | FW | ISR | Dudu Biton (from F.C. Ashdod) |

Out:

| No. | Pos. | Nation | Player |
|---|---|---|---|
| — | FW | ISR | Eli Elbaz (to Maccabi Petah Tikva) |
| — | MF | ISR | Maxim Plakuschenko (to Maccabi Haifa) |
| — | FW | GRE | Thanasis Papazoglou (to (Romania) Dinamo București) |
| — | FW | ISR | Mamoon Qashoua (released) |
| — | MF | ISR | Roei Shukrani (on loan to Hapoel Acre) |

== Pre-season and friendlies ==
Win Draw Loss

| 6 July 2018 | Hapoel Hadera | 0 - 1 | Hapoel Haifa | Hadera |
| | | | Arel 75' | Stadium: Hadera |

| 9 July 2018 | Hapoel Haifa | 3 - 3 | Hapoel Ironi Kiryat Shmona | Haifa |
| | Plakuschenko 12'; Fadida 86'; Hadida 89' | Report | García 7'; Hasselbaink 45'; Ryan 70' | Stadium: Beit Nagler; Attendance: 400 |

| 11 July 2018 Training Camp | Hapoel Haifa (Israel) | 0 - 2 | (Belgium) KV Oostende | Netherlands |
| 19:00 | | Report | Rajsel 22' (pen.); Capon 65' |

| 14 July 2018 Training Camp | Hapoel Haifa (Israel) | 1 - 3 | (Belgium) Club Brugge | Netherlands |
| 20:00 | Ben Basat 18' | Report | Vanaken 14', 39'; Refaelov 89' |

| 17 July 2018 Training Camp | Hapoel Haifa (Israel) | 1 - 1 | (Belgium) Zulte Waregem | Netherlands |
| 20:00 | Gînsari 4' | Report | Kaya 33' |

| 4 September 2018 | Hapoel Haifa | 1 - 0 | Hapoel Nazareth Illit | Haifa |
| | Mitrevski 47' | Report | | Stadium: Beit Nagler |

| 23 November 2018 | Hapoel Haifa | 2 - 0 | Hapoel Nazareth Illit | Haifa |
| 10:30 | Azubel 40'; Vermouth 55' (pen.) | Report | | Stadium: Migrashei Etos |

== Competitions ==
=== Overview ===
| Competition | First match | Last match | Starting round | Final position | Record | | | | | | | |
| Competition | First match | Last match | Starting round | Final position | Pld | W | D | L | GF | GA | GD | Win % |
|---|---|---|---|---|---|---|---|---|---|---|---|---|
| Ligat Ha'Al | 25 August 2018 | 12 May 2019 | Matchday 1 | 11th | 33 | 8 | 13 | 12 | 44 | 47 | −3 | 24.24 |
| State Cup | 20 December 2018 | | Eighth Round | Eighth Round | 1 | 0 | 0 | 1 | 0 | 1 | −1 | 0.00 |
| Super Cup | 28 July 2018 | | Final | Winners | 1 | 0 | 1 | 0 | 1 | 1 | +0 | 0.00 |
| Toto Cup | 20 August 2018 | | Semi Final | Semi Final | 1 | 0 | 1 | 0 | 1 | 1 | +0 | 0.00 |
| UEFA Europa League | 26 July 2018 | 16 August 2018 | Second qualifying round | Third qualifying round | 4 | 1 | 1 | 2 | 3 | 7 | −4 | 25.00 |
| Total | | | | | 40 | 9 | 16 | 15 | 49 | 57 | −8 | 22.50 |

Last updated: 12 May 2019.
Source: Competitions

== UEFA Europa League ==
Win Draw Loss

=== Second qualifying round ===
| 26 July 2018 First leg | Hapoel Haifa (Israel) | 1 - 1 | (Iceland) FH | Haifa, Israel |
| 19:00 | Arel (yellow card) 52'; Papazoglou 65' (yellow card) 88'; Dilmoni (yellow card) 72' | Report | Viðarsson (yellow card) 52'; Gomes 53' (yellow card) 72'; Nielsen (yellow card) 90+2' | Stadium: Sammy Ofer Stadium; Attendance: 3,950; Referee: Srđan Jovanović (Serbia) |

| 2 August 2018 Second leg | FH (Iceland) | 0 - 1 (1 – 2 agg.) | (Israel) Hapoel Haifa | Hafnarfjörður, Iceland |
| 22:15 | Crawford (yellow card) 49'; Jónsson (yellow card) 90+3'; Hendriksson (yellow card) 90+3' | Report | Elbaz 68'; Malul (yellow card) 68' | Stadium: Kaplakriki; Attendance: 1,136; Referee: Sergey Tsinkevich (Belarus) |

=== Third qualifying round ===
| 9 August 2018 First leg | Hapoel Haifa (Israel) | 1 - 4 | (Italy) Atalanta | Haifa, Israel |
| 19:00 | Buzaglo 7' | Report | Hateboer 18'; Zapata 21'; Palomino (yellow card) 33'; Pašalić 65'; Barrow 86'; Gosens (yellow card) 90+1' | Stadium: Sammy Ofer Stadium; Attendance: 6,412; Referee: Harald Lechner (Austria) |

| 16 August 2018 Second leg | Atalanta (Italy) | 2 - 0 (6 – 1 agg.) | (Israel) Hapoel Haifa | Reggio Emilia, Italy |
| 21:00 | Zapata 71'; Cornelius 90+2' | Report | Tamaș (yellow card) 79' | Stadium: Mapei Stadium – Città del Tricolore; Attendance: 6,546; Referee: Frank Schneider (France) |

== Ligat Ha'Al ==
=== Results summary ===
| Overall | | | | | | | | Home | | | | | | Away | | | | | |
| Pld | W | D | L | GF | GA | GD | Pts | W | D | L | GF | GA | GD | W | D | L | GF | GA | GD |
|---|---|---|---|---|---|---|---|---|---|---|---|---|---|---|---|---|---|---|---|
| 33 | 8 | 13 | 12 | 44 | 47 | −3 | 37 | 2 | 9 | 6 | 21 | 27 | −6 | 6 | 4 | 6 | 23 | 20 | +3 |

Last updated: 12 May 2019.

=== Results by matchday ===
| Matchday | 1 | 2 | 3 | 4 | 5 | 6 | 7 | 8 | 9 | 10 | 11 | 12 | 13 | 14 | 15 | 16 | 17 | 18 | 19 | 20 | 21 | 22 | 23 | 24 | 25 | 26 | 27 | 28 | 29 | 30 | 31 | 32 | 33 |
|---|---|---|---|---|---|---|---|---|---|---|---|---|---|---|---|---|---|---|---|---|---|---|---|---|---|---|---|---|---|---|---|---|---|
| Ground | H | A | H | A | A | H | A | H | A | H | A | H | A | A | H | A | H | H | A | H | A | H | A | H | A | H | H | H | A | H | A | H | A |
| Result | W | L | D | L | D | L | D | L | W | L | W | D | W | W | D | D | D | W | W | D | D | L | L | D | L | D | D | D | L | L | W | L | L |
| Position | 1 | 5 | 5 | 8 | 8 | 12 | 11 | 13 | 8 | 11 | 10 | 10 | 6 | 5 | 6 | 7 | 7 | 6 | 5 | 4 | 5 | 6 | 7 | 7 | 7 | 7 | 8 | 8 | 8 | 10 | 9 | 10 | 11 |

Updated to match(es) played on 12 May 2019. Source:
A = Away; H = Home; W = Win; D = Draw; L = Loss

=== Regular season ===
Win Draw Loss

| 25 August 2018 Match 1 | Hapoel Haifa | 5 - 0 | Maccabi Netanya | Haifa |
| 19:30 | Malul 6'; Sjöstedt (yellow card) 35' (goal) 43'; Elbaz 45+2'; Tamaș (yellow card) 55'; Zamir 58', 62' | Report | Amos (yellow card) 44'; Kanichowsky (yellow card) 80'; Malede (yellow card) 83'; Avraham (yellow card) 89' | Stadium: Sammy Ofer; Attendance: 5,000; Referee: Gal Leivovitch |

| 1 September 2018 Match 2 | Hapoel Tel Aviv | 1 - 0 | Hapoel Haifa | Petah Tikva |
| 20:45 | Agayev 87'; Farhat (yellow card) 90+4' | Report | Tamaș (yellow card) 37'; Arel (yellow card) 84'; Elbaz (yellow card) 90+4' | Stadium: HaMoshava; Attendance: 6,500; Referee: Daniel Bar Natan |

| 17 September 2018 Match 3 | Hapoel Haifa | 2 - 2 | Beitar Jerusalem | Haifa |
| 21:00 | Tamaș (yellow card) 1'; Gînsari 29'; Azubel 67' | Report | Vered (yellow card) 24' (goal) 40'; Inbrum 64'; Zhairi (yellow card) 88'; Levy (yellow card) 88' | Stadium: Sammy Ofer; Attendance: 8,840; Referee: Erez Papir |

| 24 September 2018 Match 4 | Hapoel Hadera | 2 - 0 | Hapoel Haifa | Netanya |
| 19:00 | Lababidi (yellow card) 75'; Mateos (yellow card) 80'; Lúcio 86'; Abu Zaid 90' | Report | Azubel (yellow card) 24'; Plakuschenko (yellow card) 63' | Stadium: Netanya; Attendance: 3,000; Referee: Liran Liani |

| 29 September 2018 Match 5 | Maccabi Petah Tikva | 1 - 1 | Hapoel Haifa | Petah Tikva |
| 18:00 | Benayoun 60'; Kanyuk (yellow card) 82' | Report | Kapiloto 34'; Arel (yellow card) 87' | Stadium: HaMoshava; Attendance: 1,800; Referee: Ziv Adler |

| 6 October 2018 Match 6 | Hapoel Haifa | 0 - 3 | Bnei Sakhnin | Haifa |
| 18:45 | Vermouth (yellow card) 40'; Azubel (yellow card) 76'; Malul (yellow card) 87' | Report | Ghadir (yellow card) 5' (goal) 26'; Ottman (yellow card) 21' (goal) 65'; Ganayem (yellow card) 33'; Azulay 50' | Stadium: Sammy Ofer; Attendance: 3,700; Referee: Eli Hachmon |

| 20 October 2018 Match 7 | Hapoel Ironi Kiryat Shmona | 1 - 1 | Hapoel Haifa | Kiryat Shmona |
| 19:00 | Shamir (yellow card) 47'; Lakou (yellow card) 52'; Shaker 54'; Broun (yellow card) 88' | Report | Arel 22' (pen.) (yellow card) 65'; Tamaș (yellow card) 71' | Stadium: Kiryat Shmona Municipal; Attendance: 1,000; Referee: Eitan Shmuelevich |

| 28 October 2018 Match 8 | Hapoel Haifa | 1 - 3 | Maccabi Tel Aviv | Haifa |
| 20:30 | Arel (yellow card) 22'; Vermouth (yellow card) 45'; Mitrevski 90+1' | Report | Atzili 3'; Rikan (yellow card) 39' (goal) 45'; Peretz 79' | Stadium: Sammy Ofer; Attendance: 5,893; Referee: Daniel Bar Natan |

| 3 November 2018 Match 9 | F.C. Ashdod | 0 - 3 | Hapoel Haifa | Ashdod |
| 18:10 | Bručić (yellow card) 80' | Report | Gînsari 58', 61'; Arel 88' (pen.) | Stadium: Yud-Alef; Attendance: 1,200; Referee: Alon Yefet |

| 10 November 2018 Match 10 | Hapoel Haifa | 0 - 2 | Bnei Yehuda Tel Aviv | Haifa |
| 18:00 | Tamaș (yellow card) 26' | Report | Shua 55'; Yehezkel 90' | Stadium: Sammy Ofer; Attendance: 4,420; Referee: David Fuxman |

| 1 December 2018 Match 11 | Maccabi Haifa | 1 - 3 | Hapoel Haifa | Haifa |
| 21:00 | Tamaș 72' (o.g.); Rukavytsya (penalty missed) 78; Menahem (yellow card) 90+2' | Report | Azubel 14'; Vermouth 20', 55' | Stadium: Sammy Ofer; Attendance: 30,000; Referee: Alon Yefet |

| 4 December 2018 Match 12 | Hapoel Haifa | 4 - 4 | Hapoel Be'er Sheva | Haifa |
| 21:00 | Zamir 27', 84' (yellow card) 85'; Plakuschenko 32' (yellow card) 51'; Arel 66' (pen.) | Report | Saba 9'; Elhamed 17'; Sahar 30'; Hasselbaink 39' | Stadium: Sammy Ofer; Attendance: 3,654; Referee: Orel Grinfeld |

| 9 December 2018 Match 13 | Hapoel Ra'anana | 0 - 3 | Hapoel Haifa | Ramat Gan |
| 19:00 | Vered (yellow card) 47'; Maimoni (yellow card) 48'; Mbola (yellow card) 51'; Binyamin (yellow card) 76'; Oremuš (yellow card) 87' (yellow-red card) 90+2' | Report | Hadida 11'; Goldberg (yellow card) 51'; Zamir 54'; Gînsari 64'; Arel (yellow card) 88'; Malul (yellow card) 90+1' | Stadium: Ramat Gan; Attendance: 1,000; Referee: David Fuxman |

| 15 December 2018 Match 14 | Maccabi Netanya | 1 - 2 | Hapoel Haifa | Netanya |
| 18:15 | Bećiraj 30'; Olsak (yellow card) 45+2'; Tiram (yellow card) 84' | Report | Malul (yellow card) 4'; Azubel 55' (yellow card) 86'; Tamaș 89' | Stadium: Netanya; Attendance: 6,020; Referee: Igal Farid |

| 26 December 2018 Match 15 | Hapoel Haifa | 1 - 1 | Hapoel Tel Aviv | Haifa |
| 20:00 | Zamir 14'; Gînsari (yellow card) 74'; Arel (yellow card) 90+4' | Report | Dgani (yellow card) 26'; Lax (yellow card) 34'; Abed 67' | Stadium: Sammy Ofer; Attendance: 3,950; Referee: Shalom Ben Avraham |

| 31 December 2018 Match 16 | Beitar Jerusalem | 1 - 1 | Hapoel Haifa | Jerusalem |
| 21:00 | Inbrum (yellow card) 76'; Varenne 77' | Report | Arel 56' (pen.); Mitrevski (yellow card) 86' | Stadium: Teddy; Attendance: 7,513; Referee: Alon Yefet |

| 5 January 2019 Match 17 | Hapoel Haifa | 1 - 1 | Hapoel Hadera | Haifa |
| 18:00 | Elbaz 51' | Report | Peretz 6'; Ejide (yellow card) 70'; Zalka (yellow card) 85' | Stadium: Sammy Ofer; Attendance: 4,300; Referee: Gal Leivovich |

| 12 January 2019 Match 18 | Hapoel Haifa | 4 - 2 | Maccabi Petah Tikva | Haifa |
| 18:15 | Danino 17' (o.g.); Malul (yellow card) 21'; Azubel 44'; Gînsari 49' (yellow card) 70'; Hozez 72' | Report | Baribo 4', 90+1'; Pires (yellow card) 52' | Stadium: Sammy Ofer; Attendance: 3,486; Referee: Idan Layba |

| 19 January 2019 Match 19 | Bnei Sakhnin | 0 - 4 | Hapoel Haifa | Sakhnin |
| 18:00 | Falah (yellow card) 17'; Khalaila (yellow card) 57'; Zaguri (yellow card) 84' | Report | Hozez 42', 44', 77'; Plakuschenko 86' | Stadium: Doha; Attendance: 1,490; Referee: Igal Farid |

| 26 January 2019 Match 20 | Hapoel Haifa | 1 - 1 | Hapoel Ironi Kiryat Shmona | Haifa |
| 18:00 | Gînsari (yellow card) 37'; Zamir (yellow card) 46' (yellow-red card) 63'; Hozez (yellow card) 57'; Shemesh 73'; Kapiloto (yellow card) 78' | Report | Goldenberg (yellow card) 18'; Shamir 48' | Stadium: Sammy Ofer; Attendance: 4,350; Referee: Aviad Shiluah |

| 3 February 2019 Match 21 | Maccabi Tel Aviv | 1 - 1 | Hapoel Haifa | Netanya |
| 20:30 | Saborit 37'; Kandil (yellow card) 90+4' | Report | Mitrevski (yellow card) 28'; Tamaș 81' | Stadium: Netanya; Attendance: 9,460; Referee: Idan Leyba |

| 9 February 2019 Match 22 | Hapoel Haifa | 0 - 1 | F.C. Ashdod | Haifa |
| 16:00 | Mitrevski (yellow card) 18'; Goldberg (yellow card) 58'; Gînsari (yellow card) 70'; Tamaș (yellow card) 84'; Malul (yellow card) 85'; Hozez (yellow card) 90+3' | Report | Tsruya 63'; Khateb (yellow card) 83'; Asefa (yellow card) 89' | Stadium: Sammy Ofer; Attendance: 4,347; Referee: Na'al Uda |

| 16 February 2019 Match 23 | Bnei Yehuda Tel Aviv | 4 - 2 | Hapoel Haifa | Petah Tikva |
| 18:15 | Sylvestr 18', 57'; Konstantini 39' (pen.); Azuz (yellow card) 46'; Mori (yellow card) 48'; Sagas (yellow card) 70'; Zenati 88' | Report | Azuz 32' (o.g.); Tamaș (yellow card) 72'; Arel 82' (pen.); Malul (yellow card) 90+2' | Stadium: HaMoshava; Attendance: 1,000; Referee: Erez Papir |

| 25 February 2019 Match 24 | Hapoel Haifa | 0 - 0 | Maccabi Haifa | Haifa |
| 21:00 | Azubel (yellow card) 87' | Report | Plakuschenko (yellow card) 5'; Abu Fani (yellow card) 54'; Shua (yellow card) 67' | Stadium: Sammy Ofer; Attendance: 25,100; Referee: Eitan Shemeulevitch |

| 4 March 2019 Match 25 | Hapoel Be'er Sheva | 2 - 0 | Hapoel Haifa | Be'er Sheva |
| 21:00 | Bitton (yellow card) 35'; Sahar 65'; Sabo (yellow card) 69'; Yosefi (yellow card) 83'; Tzedek (yellow card) 84'; Maman (penalty missed) 90+6 90+6' | Report | Goldberg (yellow card) 6'; Sjöstedt (yellow card) 25'; Tamaș (yellow card) 27'; Serdal (yellow card) 60' | Stadium: Turner; Attendance: 13,139; Referee: Gal Leivovitch |

| 9 March 2019 Match 26 | Hapoel Haifa | 2 - 2 | Hapoel Ra'anana | Haifa |
| 20:30 | Sjöstedt (yellow card) 6'; Shemesh 38'; Serdal (yellow card) 39'; Hadida 69' | Report | Arshid 25'; Yadin (yellow card) 68'; Cohen 73' | Stadium: Sammy Ofer; Attendance: 3,660; Referee: Idan Layba |

==== Regular season table ====
| Pos | Team | Pld | W | D | L | GF | GA | GD | Pts | Qualification or relegation |
|---|---|---|---|---|---|---|---|---|---|---|
| 5 | Bnei Yehuda | 26 | 10 | 7 | 9 | 39 | 25 | +14 | 37 | Qualification for the Championship round |
| 6 | Hapoel Hadera | 26 | 9 | 6 | 11 | 30 | 41 | −11 | 33 | Qualification for the Championship round |
| 7 | Hapoel Haifa | 26 | 7 | 11 | 8 | 42 | 37 | +5 | 32 | Qualification for the Relegation round |
| 8 | Hapoel Tel Aviv | 26 | 6 | 13 | 7 | 26 | 23 | +3 | 31 | Qualification for the Relegation round |
| 9 | Ironi Kiryat Shmona | 26 | 7 | 9 | 10 | 25 | 28 | −3 | 30 | Qualification for the Relegation round |

Source: Soccerway
Rules for classification: 1) Points; 2) Goal difference; 3) Matches won; 4) Goals scored; 5) Head-to-head points; 6) Head-to-head goal difference; 7) Head-to-head goals scored; 8) Play-off.

==== Results overview ====
Win Draw Loss

| Opposition | Home score | Away score |
|---|---|---|
| Beitar Jerusalem | 2 - 2 | 1 - 1 |
| Bnei Sakhnin | 0 - 3 | 4 - 0 |
| Bnei Yehuda Tel Aviv | 0 - 2 | 2 - 4 |
| F.C. Ashdod | 0 - 1 | 3 - 0 |
| Hapoel Be'er Sheva | 4 - 4 | 0 - 2 |
| Hapoel Hadera | 1 - 1 | 0 - 2 |
| Hapoel Ironi Kiryat Shmona | 1 - 1 | 1 - 1 |
| Hapoel Ra'anana | 2 - 2 | 3 - 0 |
| Hapoel Tel Aviv | 1 - 1 | 0 - 1 |
| Maccabi Haifa | 0 - 0 | 3 - 1 |
| Maccabi Netanya | 5 - 0 | 2 - 1 |
| Maccabi Petah Tikva | 4 - 2 | 1 - 1 |
| Maccabi Tel Aviv | 1 - 3 | 1 - 1 |

=== Play-off ===
| 17 March 2019 Match 27 | Hapoel Haifa | 0 - 0 | Beitar Jerusalem | Haifa |
| 21:00 | Mitrevski (yellow card) 37' | Report | Berihon (yellow card) 62' | Stadium: Sammy Ofer; Attendance: 2,900; Referee: Liran Liani |

| 1 April 2019 Match 28 | Hapoel Haifa | 0 - 0 | Hapoel Tel Aviv | Haifa |
| 20:30 | Kapiloto (yellow card) 76'; Hadida (yellow card) 90+1' | Report | Dgani (yellow card) 37' | Stadium: Sammy Ofer; Attendance: 2,950; Referee: Igal Frid |

| 6 April 2019 Match 29 | Hapoel Ironi Kiryat Shmona | 3 - 0 | Hapoel Haifa | Kiryat Shmona |
| 18:00 | Shamir 50', 75'; Barry 67'; Mor (yellow card) 69' | Report | Hadida (yellow card) 21'; Kapiloto (yellow card) 67' | Stadium: Kiryat Shmona Municipal; Attendance: 600; Referee: Eli Hachmon |

| 13 April 2019 Match 30 | Hapoel Haifa | 0 - 2 | Hapoel Ra'anana | Haifa |
| 18:00 | Gînsari (yellow card) 30'; Vermouth (yellow card) 63'; Mitrevski (yellow card) 66'; Arel (yellow card) 67'; Azubel (yellow card) 72' | Report | Cohen 33'; Ganem (yellow card) 46'; Ansah 48'; Tzur (yellow card) 86' | Stadium: Sammy Ofer; Attendance: 2,340; Referee: Daniel Bar Natan |

| 27 April 2019 Match 31 | Bnei Sakhnin | 1 - 2 | Hapoel Haifa | Sakhnin |
| 20:30 | Ottman (yellow card) 47'; Kalibat (yellow card) 60'; Nassar (yellow card) 63'; Ghadir 64' | Report | Serdal (yellow card) 31'; Hozez 40'; Azubel 71' | Stadium: Doha; Attendance: 1,150; Referee: Igal Frid |

| 4 May 2019 Match 32 | Hapoel Haifa | 0 - 3 | Maccabi Petah Tikva | Haifa |
| 20:30 | Azulay (yellow card) 31'; Kapiloto (yellow card) 57' | Report | Adheneny 7'; Cooper 26'; Baribo 74'; Danino (yellow card) 90' | Stadium: Sammy Ofer; Attendance: 2,400; Referee: Ziv Adler |

| 12 May 2019 Match 33 | F.C. Ashdod | 1 - 0 | Hapoel Haifa | Ashdod |
| 20:30 | Khateb 9' (yellow card) 58'; Bardea (yellow card) 89' | Report | Sjöstedt (yellow card) 28'; Kapiloto (yellow card) 52'; Arel (yellow card) 85' | Stadium: Yud-Alef; Attendance: 2,500; Referee: Erez Papir |

==== Relegation round table ====
| Pos | Team | Pld | W | D | L | GF | GA | GD | Pts | Relegation |
|---|---|---|---|---|---|---|---|---|---|---|
| 9 | Hapoel Ra'anana | 33 | 8 | 15 | 10 | 29 | 38 | −9 | 39 | |
| 10 | Ironi Kiryat Shmona | 33 | 9 | 11 | 13 | 34 | 35 | −1 | 38 | |
| 11 | Hapoel Haifa | 33 | 8 | 13 | 12 | 44 | 47 | −3 | 37 | |
| 12 | F.C. Ashdod | 33 | 10 | 7 | 16 | 34 | 54 | −20 | 37 | |
| 13 | Maccabi Petah Tikva (R) | 33 | 8 | 12 | 13 | 33 | 51 | −18 | 36 | Relegation to Liga Leumit |

Source: Soccerway
Rules for classification: 1) Points; 2) Goal difference; 3) Matches won; 4) Goals scored; 5) Head-to-head points; 6) Head-to-head goal difference; 7) Head-to-head goals scored; 8) Play-off.
(R) Relegated

==== Results overview ====
Win Draw Loss

| Opposition | Home score | Away score |
|---|---|---|
| Beitar Jerusalem | 0 - 0 | |
| Bnei Sakhnin | | 2 - 1 |
| F.C. Ashdod | | 0 - 1 |
| Hapoel Ironi Kiryat Shmona | | 0 - 3 |
| Hapoel Ra'anana | 0 - 2 | |
| Hapoel Tel Aviv | 0 - 0 | |
| Maccabi Petah Tikva | 0 - 3 | |

== State Cup ==
=== Round of 32 ===
| 20 December 2018 Round of 32 | Hapoel Haifa | 0 - 1 | Hapoel Acre | Haifa |
| 21:00 | Tamaș (yellow card) 33'; Dilmoni (yellow card) 43'; Sjöstedt (yellow card) 54' | Report | Khalaila (yellow card) 23'; Khalaila 55' (yellow card) 55' | Stadium: Sammy Ofer; Attendance: 1,500; Referee: Eli Hachmon |

== Israel Super Cup ==
Win Draw Loss

| 28 July 2018 Super Cup | Hapoel Haifa | 1 - 1 (5 - 4 p) | Hapoel Be'er Sheva | Netanya |
| 21:00 | Tamaș 28'; Kapiloto (yellow card) 55'; Sjöstedt (yellow card) 68'; Dilmoni (yellow card) 88'; Elbaz (yellow card) 90+2' | Report | Dilmoni 26' (o.g.); Cétout (yellow card) 72' | Stadium: Netanya; Referee: Guy Berger |
| | Penalties |
| | Tamas (penalty scored); Kapiloto (penalty scored); Plakuschenko (penalty scored); Hadida (penalty scored); Arel (penalty scored) | | Sahar (penalty scored); Melikson (penalty scored); Zrihan (penalty scored); Ezra (penalty missed); Tzedek (penalty scored) |

== Toto Cup ==
=== Semi-final ===
Win Draw Loss

| 20 August 2018 Semi-Final | Hapoel Haifa | 1 - 1 (2 - 3 p) | Maccabi Haifa | Haifa |
| 21:00 | Hadida (yellow card) 21'; Papazoglou (red card) 76'; Zamir 82' | Report | Mizrahi (yellow card) 51' dos Santos (yellow card) 68'; Rukavytsya 73'; Haimov (yellow card) | Stadium: Sammy Ofer Stadium; Attendance: 10,600; Referee: Erez Papir |
| | Penalties |
| | Tamaș (penalty scored); Kapiloto (penalty scored); Plakuschenko (penalty missed); Zamir (penalty missed); Malul (penalty missed) | | Alberman (penalty scored); Rukavytsya (penalty missed); Mandjeck (penalty missed); Habshi (penalty scored); Kramer (penalty scored) |

== Statistics ==
=== Appearances and goals ===
| No. | Pos | Nat | Player | Total | | Ligat Ha'Al | | State Cup | | Super Cup | | Toto Cup | | UEFA Europa League | |
| No. | Pos | Nat | Player | Apps | Goals | Apps | Goals | Apps | Goals | Apps | Goals | Apps | Goals | Apps | Goals |
|---|---|---|---|---|---|---|---|---|---|---|---|---|---|---|---|
| 1 | GK | (Israel) ISR | Ran Kadoch | 6 | 0 | 3 | 0 | 1 | 0 | 1 | 0 | 1 | 0 | 0 | 0 |
| 2 | DF | (Sweden) SWE | Rasmus Sjöstedt | 32 | 1 | 25 | 1 | 1 | 0 | 1 | 0 | 1 | 0 | 4 | 0 |
| 3 | DF | (Israel) ISR | Sean Goldberg | 27 | 0 | 26 | 0 | 0 | 0 | 0 | 0 | 1 | 0 | 0 | 0 |
| 4 | DF | (Israel) ISR | Dor Malul | 37 | 1 | 31 | 1 | 1 | 0 | 0 | 0 | 1 | 0 | 4 | 0 |
| 6 | MF | (Israel) ISR | Gal Arel | 36 | 5 | 30 | 5 | 0 | 0 | 1 | 0 | 1 | 0 | 4 | 0 |
| 7 | MF | (Israel) ISR | Shlomi Azulay | 6 | 0 | 6 | 0 | 0 | 0 | 0 | 0 | 0 | 0 | 0 | 0 |
| 8 | FW | (Israel) ISR | Idan Shemesh | 10 | 2 | 10 | 2 | 0 | 0 | 0 | 0 | 0 | 0 | 0 | 0 |
| 9 | FW | (Israel) ISR | Ben Azubel | 29 | 5 | 28 | 5 | 1 | 0 | 0 | 0 | 0 | 0 | 0 | 0 |
| 10 | FW | (Moldova) MDA | Radu Gînsari | 37 | 5 | 32 | 5 | 0 | 0 | 0 | 0 | 1 | 0 | 4 | 0 |
| 11 | MF | (Israel) ISR | Ness Zamir | 36 | 7 | 32 | 6 | 1 | 0 | 1 | 0 | 1 | 1 | 1 | 0 |
| 13 | GK | (Lithuania) LTU | Ernestas Šetkus | 34 | 0 | 30 | 0 | 0 | 0 | 0 | 0 | 0 | 0 | 4 | 0 |
| 14 | MF | (Israel) ISR | Gil Vermouth | 33 | 2 | 27 | 2 | 1 | 0 | 0 | 0 | 1 | 0 | 4 | 0 |
| 18 | DF | (Israel) ISR | Hen Dilmoni | 10 | 0 | 4 | 0 | 1 | 0 | 1 | 0 | 0 | 0 | 4 | 0 |
| 20 | FW | (Israel) ISR | Dudu Biton | 2 | 0 | 2 | 0 | 0 | 0 | 0 | 0 | 0 | 0 | 0 | 0 |
| 21 | MF | (Israel) ISR | Snir Talias | 0 | 0 | 0 | 0 | 0 | 0 | 0 | 0 | 0 | 0 | 0 | 0 |
| 23 | MF | (Israel) ISR | Guy Hadida | 34 | 2 | 27 | 2 | 1 | 0 | 1 | 0 | 1 | 0 | 4 | 0 |
| 24 | DF | (Israel) ISR | Liran Serdal | 14 | 0 | 13 | 0 | 1 | 0 | 0 | 0 | 0 | 0 | 0 | 0 |
| 26 | DF | (Israel) ISR | Guy Mishpati | 10 | 0 | 9 | 0 | 0 | 0 | 1 | 0 | 0 | 0 | 0 | 0 |
| 29 | MF | (Israel) ISR | Lior Berkovic | 0 | 0 | 0 | 0 | 0 | 0 | 0 | 0 | 0 | 0 | 0 | 0 |
| 30 | DF | (Romania) ROU | Gabriel Tamaș | 29 | 3 | 23 | 2 | 1 | 0 | 1 | 1 | 1 | 0 | 3 | 0 |
| 39 | GK | (Israel) ISR | Tal Hadar | 0 | 0 | 0 | 0 | 0 | 0 | 0 | 0 | 0 | 0 | 0 | 0 |
| 45 | FW | (Israel) ISR | Matan Hozez | 16 | 5 | 16 | 5 | 0 | 0 | 0 | 0 | 0 | 0 | 0 | 0 |
| 51 | DF | (North Macedonia) MKD | Risto Mitrevski | 33 | 1 | 27 | 1 | 1 | 0 | 1 | 0 | 1 | 0 | 3 | 0 |
| 55 | DF | (Israel) ISR | Nisso Kapiloto | 27 | 1 | 21 | 1 | 0 | 0 | 1 | 0 | 1 | 0 | 4 | 0 |
| 77 | FW | (Israel) ISR | Almog Buzaglo | 3 | 1 | 1 | 0 | 0 | 0 | 0 | 0 | 0 | 0 | 2 | 1 |
Players away from Hapoel Haifa on loan:
| 5 | MF | (Israel) ISR | Roei Shukrani | 3 | 0 | 1 | 0 | 1 | 0 | 1 | 0 | 0 | 0 | 0 | 0 |
Players who appeared for Hapoel Haifa that left during the season:
| 7 | MF | (Israel) ISR | Maxim Plakuschenko | 25 | 2 | 18 | 2 | 1 | 0 | 1 | 0 | 1 | 0 | 4 | 0 |
| 17 | FW | (Israel) ISR | Eli Elbaz | 17 | 3 | 12 | 2 | 1 | 0 | 1 | 0 | 0 | 0 | 3 | 1 |
| 19 | FW | (Greece) GRE | Thanasis Papazoglou | 13 | 1 | 7 | 0 | 0 | 0 | 1 | 0 | 1 | 0 | 4 | 1 |
| 99 | FW | (Israel) ISR | Mamoon Qashoua | 2 | 0 | 0 | 0 | 0 | 0 | 1 | 0 | 1 | 0 | 0 | 0 |

=== Goalscorers ===
| Rank | No. | Pos | Nat | Name | Ligat Ha'Al | State Cup | Super Cup | Toto Cup | UEFA Europa League | Total |
|---|---|---|---|---|---|---|---|---|---|---|
| 1 | 11 | MF | (Israel) | Ness Zamir | 6 | 0 | 0 | 1 | 0 | 7 |
| 2 | 6 | DF | (Israel) | Gal Arel | 5 | 0 | 0 | 0 | 0 | 5 |
| 2 | 9 | FW | (Israel) | Ben Azubel | 5 | 0 | 0 | 0 | 0 | 5 |
| 2 | 10 | FW | (Moldova) | Radu Gînsari | 5 | 0 | 0 | 0 | 0 | 5 |
| 2 | 45 | FW | (Israel) | Matan Hozez | 5 | 0 | 0 | 0 | 0 | 5 |
| 6 | 30 | DF | (Romania) | Gabriel Tamaș | 2 | 0 | 1 | 0 | 0 | 3 |
| 6 | 17 | FW | (Israel) | Eli Elbaz | 2 | 0 | 0 | 0 | 1 | 3 |
| 8 | 8 | FW | (Israel) | Idan Shemesh | 2 | 0 | 0 | 0 | 0 | 2 |
| 8 | 14 | MF | (Israel) | Gil Vermouth | 2 | 0 | 0 | 0 | 0 | 2 |
| 8 | 23 | MF | (Israel) | Guy Hadida | 2 | 0 | 0 | 0 | 0 | 2 |
| 8 | 7 | MF | (Israel) | Maxim Plakuschenko | 2 | 0 | 0 | 0 | 0 | 2 |
| 12 | 2 | DF | (Sweden) | Rasmus Sjöstedt | 1 | 0 | 0 | 0 | 0 | 1 |
| 12 | 4 | DF | (Israel) | Dor Malul | 1 | 0 | 0 | 0 | 0 | 1 |
| 12 | 51 | DF | (North Macedonia) | Risto Mitrevski | 1 | 0 | 0 | 0 | 0 | 1 |
| 12 | 55 | DF | (Israel) | Nisso Kapiloto | 1 | 0 | 0 | 0 | 0 | 1 |
| 12 | 77 | FW | (Israel) | Almog Buzaglo | 0 | 0 | 0 | 0 | 1 | 1 |
| 12 | 19 | FW | (Greece) | Thanasis Papazoglou | 0 | 0 | 0 | 0 | 1 | 1 |
| Own goal | | | | | 2 | 0 | 0 | 0 | 0 | 2 |
| Totals | | | | | 44 | 0 | 1 | 1 | 3 | 49 |

Last updated: 12 May 2019

=== Assists ===
| Rank | No. | Pos | Nat | Name | Ligat Ha'Al | State Cup | Super Cup | Toto Cup | UEFA Europa League | Total |
|---|---|---|---|---|---|---|---|---|---|---|
| 1 | 14 | MF | (Israel) | Gil Vermouth | 5 | 0 | 0 | 0 | 1 | 6 |
| 2 | 11 | MF | (Israel) | Ness Zamir | 5 | 0 | 0 | 0 | 0 | 5 |
| 2 | 4 | DF | (Israel) | Dor Malul | 4 | 0 | 0 | 0 | 1 | 5 |
| 2 | 7 | MF | (Israel) | Maxim Plakuschenko | 4 | 0 | 0 | 1 | 0 | 5 |
| 5 | 10 | FW | (Moldova) | Radu Gînsari | 4 | 0 | 0 | 0 | 0 | 4 |
| 6 | 23 | MF | (Israel) | Guy Hadida | 2 | 0 | 1 | 0 | 0 | 3 |
| 7 | 9 | FW | (Israel) | Ben Azubel | 2 | 0 | 0 | 0 | 0 | 2 |
| 7 | 17 | FW | (Israel) | Eli Elbaz | 2 | 0 | 0 | 0 | 0 | 2 |
| 9 | 2 | DF | (Sweden) | Rasmus Sjöstedt | 1 | 0 | 0 | 0 | 0 | 1 |
| 9 | 30 | DF | (Romania) | Gabriel Tamaș | 0 | 0 | 0 | 0 | 1 | 1 |
| Totals | | | | | 28 | 0 | 1 | 1 | 3 | 33 |

Last updated: 12 May 2019

=== Clean sheets ===
Updated on 12 May 2019

| Rank | Pos. | No. | Name | Ligat Ha'Al | State Cup | Super Cup | Toto Cup | UEFA Europa League | Total |
|---|---|---|---|---|---|---|---|---|---|
| 1 | GK | 13 | (Lithuania) Ernestas Šetkus | 6 | 0 | 0 | 0 | 1 | 7 |
| 2 | GK | 1 | (Israel) Ran Kadoch | 1 | 0 | 0 | 0 | 0 | 1 |
| Totals | | | | 7 | 0 | 0 | 0 | 1 | 8 |

=== Disciplinary record ===
Updated on 12 May 2019

| No. | Pos | Nat | Name | Ligat Ha'Al | | | State Cup | | | Super Cup | | | Toto Cup | | | UEFA Europa League | | | Total | | |
| No. | Pos | Nat | Name | Yellow card | (yellow card) (yellow-red card) | Red card | Yellow card | (yellow card) (yellow-red card) | Red card | Yellow card | (yellow card) (yellow-red card) | Red card | Yellow card | (yellow card) (yellow-red card) | Red card | Yellow card | (yellow card) (yellow-red card) | Red card | Yellow card | (yellow card) (yellow-red card) | Red card |
| 6 | MF | (Israel) | Gal Arel | 9 | | | | | | | | | | | | 1 | | | 10 | | |
| 30 | DF | (Romania) | Gabriel Tamaș | 8 | | | 1 | | | | | | | | | 1 | | | 10 | | |
| 4 | DF | (Israel) | Dor Malul | 6 | | | | | | | | | | | | 1 | | | 7 | | |
| 55 | DF | (Israel) | Nisso Kapiloto | 5 | | | | | | 1 | | | | | | | | | 6 | | |
| 2 | DF | (Sweden) | Rasmus Sjöstedt | 4 | | | 1 | | | 1 | | | | | | | | | 6 | | |
| 9 | FW | (Israel) | Ben Azubel | 5 | | | | | | | | | | | | | | | 5 | | |
| 10 | FW | (Moldova) | Radu Gînsari | 5 | | | | | | | | | | | | | | | 5 | | |
| 51 | DF | (North Macedonia) | Risto Mitrevski | 5 | | | | | | | | | | | | | | | 5 | | |
| 3 | DF | (Israel) | Sean Goldberg | 3 | | | | | | | | | | | | | | | 3 | | |
| 14 | MF | (Israel) | Gil Vermouth | 3 | | | | | | | | | | | | | | | 3 | | |
| 23 | MF | (Israel) | Guy Hadida | 2 | | | | | | | | | 1 | | | | | | 3 | | |
| 18 | DF | (Israel) | Hen Dilmoni | | | | 1 | | | 1 | | | | | | 1 | | | 3 | | |
| 11 | MF | (Israel) | Ness Zamir | 1 | 1 | | | | | | | | | | | | | | 1 | 1 | |
| 19 | FW | (Greece) | Thanasis Papazoglou | | | | | | | | | | | | 1 | 1 | | | 1 | | 1 |
| 7 | MF | (Israel) | Maxim Plakuschenko | 2 | | | | | | | | | | | | | | | 2 | | |
| 24 | DF | (Israel) | Liran Serdal | 2 | | | | | | | | | | | | | | | 2 | | |
| 45 | FW | (Israel) | Matan Hozez | 2 | | | | | | | | | | | | | | | 2 | | |
| 17 | FW | (Israel) | Eli Elbaz | 1 | | | | | | 1 | | | | | | | | | 2 | | |
| 7 | MF | (Israel) | Shlomi Azulay | 1 | | | | | | | | | | | | | | | 1 | | |

=== Suspensions ===
Updated on 12 May 2019

| Player | Date Received | Offence | Length of suspension | | |
|---|---|---|---|---|---|
| Gabriel Tamaș | 8 December 2016 | (yellow card) 32' (yellow-red card) 79' Steaua București vs Villarreal (2016–17 Steaua București season) | 1 Match | FH (H) | 26 July 2018 |
| Thanasis Papazoglou | 20 August 2018 | (red card) 76' vs Maccabi Haifa | 1 Match | Maccabi Netanya (H) | 25 August 2018 |
| Gabriel Tamaș | 10 November 2018 | (yellow card) 26' vs Bnei Yehuda Tel Aviv | 1 Match | Hapoel Be'er Sheva (H) | 4 December 2018 |
| Gal Arel | 9 December 2018 | (yellow card) 88' vs Hapoel Ra'anana | 1 Match | Hapoel Acre (H) | 20 December 2018 |
| Ness Zamir | 26 January 2019 | (yellow card) 46' (yellow-red card) 63' vs Hapoel Ironi Kiryat Shmona | 1 Match | Maccabi Tel Aviv (A) | 3 February 2019 |
| Dor Malul | 9 February 2019 | (yellow card) 85' vs F.C. Ashdod | 1 Match | Maccabi Haifa (H) | 25 February 2019 |
| Gabriel Tamaș | 4 March 2019 | (yellow card) 27' vs Hapoel Be'er Sheva | 1 Match | Beitar Jerusalem (H) | 17 March 2019 |
| Radu Gînsari | 13 April 2019 | (yellow card) 30' vs Hapoel Ra'anana | 1 Match | Maccabi Petah Tikva (H) | - |
| Risto Mitrevski | 13 April 2019 | (yellow card) 66' vs Hapoel Ra'anana | 1 Match | Maccabi Petah Tikva (H) | - |
| Ben Azubel | 13 April 2019 | (yellow card) 72' vs Hapoel Ra'anana | 1 Match | Maccabi Petah Tikva (H) | - |

=== Penalties ===
Updated on 12 May 2019

| Date | Penalty Taker | Scored | Opponent | Competition |
|---|---|---|---|---|
| 20.10.2018 | Gal Arel | Yes | Hapoel Ironi Kiryat Shmona | Ligat Ha'Al |
| 3.11.2018 | Gal Arel | Yes | F.C. Ashdod | Ligat Ha'Al |
| 4.12.2018 | Gal Arel | Yes | Hapoel Be'er Sheva | Ligat Ha'Al |
| 31.12.2018 | Gal Arel | Yes | Beitar Jerusalem | Ligat Ha'Al |
| 16.2.2019 | Gal Arel | Yes | Bnei Yehuda Tel Aviv | Ligat Ha'Al |

=== Overall ===
| | Total | Home | Away | Natural |
|---|---|---|---|---|
| Games played | 40 | 21 | 18 | 1 |
| Games won | 9 | 2 | 7 | - |
| Games drawn | 16 | 11 | 4 | 1 |
| Games lost | 15 | 8 | 7 | - |
| Biggest win | 5 - 0 vs Maccabi Netanya | 5 - 0 vs Maccabi Netanya | 4 - 0 vs Bnei Sakhnin | - |
| Biggest loss | 1 - 4 vs Atalanta | 1 - 4 vs Atalanta | 0 - 3 vs Hapoel Ironi Kiryat Shmona | - |
| Biggest win (League) | 5 - 0 vs Maccabi Netanya | 5 - 0 vs Maccabi Netanya | 4 - 0 vs Bnei Sakhnin | - |
| Biggest loss (League) | 0 - 3 vs Bnei Sakhnin; 0 - 3 vs Hapoel Ironi Kiryat Shmona; 0 - 3 vs Maccabi Petah Tikva | 0 - 3 vs Bnei Sakhnin; 0 - 3 vs Maccabi Petah Tikva | 0 - 3 vs Hapoel Ironi Kiryat Shmona | - |
| Biggest win (Cup) | - | - | - | - |
| Biggest loss (Cup) | 0 - 1 vs Hapoel Acre | 0 - 1 vs Hapoel Acre | - | - |
| Biggest win (Super Cup) | - | - | - | - |
| Biggest loss (Super Cup) | - | - | - | - |
| Biggest win (Toto) | - | - | - | - |
| Biggest loss (Toto) | - | - | - | - |
| Biggest win (Europa League) | 1 - 0 vs FH | - | 1 - 0 vs FH | - |
| Biggest loss (Europa League) | 1 - 4 vs Atalanta | 1 - 4 vs Atalanta | 0 - 2 vs Atalanta | - |
| Goals scored | 49 | 24 | 24 | 1 |
| Goals conceded | 57 | 34 | 22 | 1 |
| Goal difference | -8 | -10 | 2 | 0 |
| Clean sheets | 8 | 4 | 4 | - |
| Average GF per game | 1.23 | 1.14 | 1.33 | 1 |
| Average GA per game | 1.43 | 1.62 | 1.22 | 1 |
| Yellow cards | 77 | 44 | 29 | 4 |
| Red cards | 2 | 2 | 0 | 0 |
| Most appearances | (Moldova) Radu Gînsari, (Israel) Dor Malul (37) | | | |
| Most goals | (Israel) Ness Zamir (7) | | | |
| Most Assist | (Israel) Gil Vermouth (6) | | | |
| Penalties for | 5 | 1 | 4 | - |
| Penalties against | 3 | - | 3 | - |
| Winning rate | 22.5% | 9.52% | 38.89% | 0% |

Last updated: Updated on 12 May 2019
Source: Competitive matches
