= 2018–19 Toto Cup Al =

Tournament details
- Country: Israel
- Teams: 14

Final positions
- Champions: Maccabi Tel Aviv (6th title)
- Runners-up: Maccabi Haifa

Tournament statistics
- Matches played: 30
- Goals scored: 79 (2.63 per match)

The 2018–19 Toto Cup Al is the 34th season of the third-important football tournament in Israel since its introduction and the 13th tournament involving Israeli Premier League clubs only.

Maccabi Tel Aviv are the defending champions.

== Format changes ==
The four clubs playing in the Champions League and Europa League (Hapoel Be'er Sheva, Maccabi Tel Aviv, Beitar Jerusalem and Hapoel Haifa) will not take part in the group stage, while the remaining ten clubs were divided into two groups of five clubs. At the end of the group stage each of the group winners will qualify to the semi-finals. Hapoel Be'er Sheva and Hapoel Haifa will play (in the 2018 Israel Super Cup match) for a place in one of the semi-finals (meeting the group winner with the fewest points accumulated), while Maccabi Tel Aviv and Beitar Jerusalem will play for a place in the other semi-final (meeting the group winner with the most points accumulated). All the clubs will participate in classification play-offs.

== Group stage ==
Groups were allocated according to geographic distribution of the clubs, with the northern clubs allocated to Group A, and the southern clubs allocated to Group B. Each club will play the other clubs once.

The matches are scheduled to start on 28 July 2018.

Key to colours in group tables
Teams advanced to the Quarterfinals

=== Group A ===
Pos	Team	Pld	W	D	L	GF	GA	GD	Pts	Qualification or relegation	MHA	MNE	BSK	HKS	HHD
1	Maccabi Haifa (Q)	4	2	2	0	9	4	+5	8	Semi-finals	—	1–1		3–2	
2	Maccabi Netanya	4	2	2	0	8	5	+3	8	5-8th classification play-offs		—	1–1		3–2
3	Bnei Sakhnin	4	1	3	0	3	2	+1	6	9-10th classification play-offs	1–1		—		0–0
4	Hapoel Kiryat Shmona	4	1	0	3	5	7	−2	3	11-12th classification play-offs		1–3	0–1	—	
5	Hapoel Hadera	4	0	1	3	2	9	−7	1	13-14th classification play-offs	0–4			0–2	—

Updated to match(es) played on unknown. Source: Israel Football Association
Rules for classification: 1) points; 2) goal difference; 3) number of wins; 4) goals scored; 5) head to head; 6)deciding match.
(Q) Qualified for the phase indicated

=== Group B ===
Pos	Team	Pld	W	D	L	GF	GA	GD	Pts	Qualification or relegation	HTA	MPT	BYT	HRA	ASD
1	Hapoel Tel Aviv (Q)	4	3	1	0	10	2	+8	10	Semi-finals	—	1–1	4–0		
2	Maccabi Petah Tikva	4	1	2	1	4	2	+2	5	5-8th classification play-offs		—	0–0		3–0
3	Bnei Yehuda	4	1	2	1	7	9	−2	5	9-10th classification play-offs			—	4–2	3–3
4	Hapoel Ra'anana	4	1	1	2	4	6	−2	4	11-12th classification play-offs	2–1	1–0		—	
5	F.C. Ashdod	4	0	2	2	3	9	−6	2	13-14th classification play-offs	0–3			0–0	—

Updated to match(es) played on unknown. Source: Israel Football Association
Rules for classification: 1) points; 2) goal difference; 3) number of wins; 4) goals scored; 5) head to head; 6)deciding match.
(Q) Qualified for the phase indicated

== European qualification route ==
=== Israel Super Cup ===
28 July 2018
21:00

Hapoel Haifa	1-1	Hapoel Be'er Sheva
Gabriel Tamas 28'	Report	Hen Dilmoni 26' (o.g.)
Penalties
Tamas (penalty scored); Kapiloto (penalty scored); Plakuschenko (penalty scored); Hadida (penalty scored); Arel (penalty scored)	5–4	Sahar (penalty scored); Melikson (penalty scored); Zrihan (penalty scored); Ezra (penalty missed); Tzedek (penalty scored)

Netanya Stadium, Netanya

=== UEFA qualifiers match ===
29 July 2018
21:00

Maccabi Tel Aviv	1-0	Beitar Jerusalem
Schoenfeld 56'	Report

Netanya Stadium, Netanya

== Classification play-offs ==
=== 13-14th classification match ===
18 August 2018	F.C. Ashdod	1-2	Hapoel Hadera	Ashdod
18:45				Stadium: Yud-Alef Stadium

=== 11-12th classification match ===
18 August 2018	Hapoel Ra'anana	1-0	Hapoel Kiryat Shmona	Ramat Gan
18:45				Stadium: Ramat Gan Stadium

=== 9-10th classification match ===
18 August 2018	Bnei Yehuda	0-0 (4-5 p)	Bnei Sakhnin	Petah Tikva
18:45				Stadium: HaMoshava Stadium

=== 7-8th classification match ===
18 August 2018	Beitar Jerusalem	1-3	Maccabi Petah Tikva	Jerusalem
21:00				Stadium: Teddy Stadium

=== 5-6th classification match ===
19 August 2018	Hapoel Be'er Sheva	2-1	Maccabi Netanya	Be'er Sheva
21:00				Stadium: Turner Stadium

== Semi-finals ==
19 August 2018
21:00

Maccabi Tel Aviv	4-1	Hapoel Tel Aviv

Netanya Stadium, Netanya
20 August 2018
21:00

Hapoel Haifa	1-1	Maccabi Haifa
Guy Hadida (yellow card) 21'; Papazoglou (red card) 76'; Zamir 82'		Mizrahi (yellow card) 51' dos Santos (yellow card) 68'; Rukavytsya 73'
Penalties
Tamaș (penalty scored); Kapiloto (penalty scored); Maxim Plakuschenko (penalty missed); Zamir (penalty missed); Malul (penalty missed)	2–3	Alberman (penalty scored); Rukavytsya (penalty missed); Mandjeck (penalty missed); Habshi (penalty scored); Kramer (penalty scored)

Sammy Ofer Stadium, Haifa
Attendance: 10,600
Referee: Erez Papir

== Final ==
26 September 2018
20:45

Maccabi Tel Aviv	2-1	Maccabi Haifa
Atzili 32'; Atar 85'		Awaed 42'

HaMoshava Stadium, Petah Tikva
Referee: Gal Leibovitz

== Final rankings ==
R	Team
1	Maccabi Tel Aviv
2	Maccabi Haifa
3	Hapoel Haifa
4	Hapoel Tel Aviv
5	Hapoel Be'er Sheva
6	Maccabi Netanya
7	Maccabi Petah Tikva
8	Beitar Jerusalem
9	Bnei Sakhnin
10	Bnei Yehuda Tel Aviv
11	Hapoel Ra'anana
12	Hapoel Ironi Kiryat Shmona
13	Hapoel Hadera
14	F.C. Ashdod
