= 2018 Israel Super Cup =

Hapoel Haifa	Hapoel Be'er Sheva
1	1
- Hapoel Haifa won 5–4 on penalties
- Date: 28 July 2018
- Venue: Netanya Stadium, Netanya

The 2018 Israel Super Cup is the 23rd Israel Super Cup (28th, including unofficial matches, as the competition wasn't played within the Israel Football Association in its first 5 editions, until 1969), an annual Israel football match played between the winners of the previous season's Top Division and Israel State Cup. This is the Third time since 1990 that the match was staged, after a planned resumption of the cup was cancelled in 2014.

The game was played between Hapoel Be'er Sheva, champions of the 2017–18 Israeli Premier League and Hapoel Haifa, winners of the 2017–18 Israeli State Cup. Hapoel Haifa won 5–4 on penalties following a 1–1 draw after 90 minutes.

== Match details ==
28 July 2018

Hapoel Haifa	1–1	Hapoel Be'er Sheva
Gabriel Tamas 28'	Report	Hen Dilmoni 26' (o.g.)
Penalties
Tamas (penalty scored); Kapiloto (penalty scored); Plakuschenko (penalty scored); Hadida (penalty scored); Arel (penalty scored)	5–4	Sahar (penalty scored); Melikson (penalty scored); Zrihan (penalty scored); Ezra (penalty missed); Tzedek (penalty scored)

Netanya Stadium, Netanya
Referee: Guy Berger

Hapoel Haifa	Hapoel Be'er Sheva

GK	1	(Israel) Ran Kadoch
RB	26	(Israel) Guy Mishpati
CB	55	(Israel) Nisso Kapiloto
CB	30	(Romania) Gabriel Tamaș (yellow card) 55'
LB	18	(Israel) Hen Dilmoni (yellow card) 88'
DM	5	(Israel) Roei Shukrani (substituted off) 70'
CM	2	(Sweden) Rasmus Sjöstedt (yellow card) 66'
LM	23	(Israel) Guy Hadida
RW	11	(Israel) Ness Zamir (substituted off) 60'
CF	99	(Israel) Maamun Qashua (substituted off) 56'
LF	19	(Greece) Thanasis Papazoglou (substituted off) 81'
Substitutes:
GK	13	(Lithuania) Ernestas Šetkus
MF	6	(Israel) Gal Arel (substituted on) 56'
MF	17	(Israel) Eli Elbaz (substituted on) 60' (yellow card) 90+2'
MF	7	(Israel) Maxim Plakuschenko (substituted on) 70'
FW	51	(North Macedonia) Risto Mitrevski (substituted on) 81'
FW	20	(Israel) Sa'ar Fadida
Manager:
(Israel) Nir Klinger

GK	1	(Israel) Dudu Goresh
RB	2	(Israel) Ben Bitton
CB	20	(Israel) Loai Taha
CB	5	(Israel) Shir Tzedek
LB	77	(Israel) Shmuel Scheimann
DM	30	(Nigeria) John Ogu
CM	82	(France) Julien Cétout (substituted off) 76' (yellow card) 72'
LM	24	(Israel) Maor Melikson (c)
RW	9	(Nigeria) Anthony Nwakaeme (substituted off) 55'
CF	28	(Israel) Hanan Maman (substituted off) 70'
FW	27	(Israel) Eden Ben Basat (substituted off) 66'
Substitutes:
GK	22	(Greece) Giannis Anestis
DF	17	(Israel) Matan Ohayon
MF	11	(Israel) Dan Einbinder (substituted on) 76'
MF	19	(Israel) Hen Ezra (substituted on) 55'
MF	7	(Israel) Niv Zrihan (substituted on) 70'
MF	12	(Israel) Guy Melamed
FW	14	(Israel) Ben Sahar (substituted on) 66'
Manager:
(Israel) Barak Bakhar

Man of the Match:

MATCH OFFICIALS

- Assistant referees:
- Fourth official:
- Additional assistant referees:

Match rules

- 90 minutes.
- Penalty shoot-out if scores level.
- Seven named substitutes, of which up to three may be used.
