= 2016 Cupa Ligii final =

- Event: 2015–16 Cupa Ligii
Steaua București	Concordia Chiajna
2	1
- Date: 17 July 2016
- Venue: Arena Națională, Bucharest
- Referee: Marius Avram
- Attendance: 9,000

The 2016 Cupa Ligii final was the final match of the 2015–16 Cupa Ligii, played between Steaua București and Concordia Chiajna. Steaua București won the match with 2–1 after extra time.

== Match ==
17 July 2016
20:00 EET (UTC+02)

Steaua București	2–1 (a.e.t.)	Concordia Chiajna
Momčilović 61'; Hamroun 111' (pen.)	Report	Pena 88'

Arena Națională, Bucharest
Attendance: 9,000
Referee: Marius Avram

Steaua București	Concordia Chiajna

GK	1	(Romania) Florin Niță
DF	4	(Romania) Gabriel Tamaș
DF	15	(Serbia) Marko Momčilović
DF	13	(Romania) Alin Toșca
MF	55	(Romania) Alexandru Bourceanu		(substituted off) 56'
DF	44	(Romania) Gabriel Enache	(yellow card) 63'
MF	5	(Algeria) Jugurtha Hamroun	(yellow card) 105'
MF	20	(Romania) Vlad Achim
MF	10	(Romania) Nicolae Stanciu (c)		(substituted off) 102'
MF	77	(Romania) Adrian Popa
FW	9	(Romania) Alexandru Tudorie		(substituted off) 46'
Substitutes:
FW	14	(Bosnia and Herzegovina) Bojan Golubović	(substituted on) 46'	(yellow card) 98'
MF	19	(Croatia) Adnan Aganović	(substituted on) 56'	(yellow card) 90+2'
MF	11	(Ghana) Sulley Muniru	(substituted on) 102'
GK	12	(Romania) Valentin Cojocaru
DF	24	(Romania) Dan Popescu
FW	16	(Romania) Robert Vâlceanu
DF	2	(Romania) Gabriel Simion
Manager:
(Romania) Laurențiu Reghecampf

GK	34	(Romania) Cristian Bălgrădean (c)	(yellow card) 110'
DF	4	(Romania) Răzvan Tincu
DF	21	(Romania) Bogdan Bucurică
DF	26	(Cameroon) Patrice Feussi		(substituted off) 84'
DF	5	(Romania) Cristian Melinte	(yellow card) 119'
DF	15	(Romania) Iulian Mamele	(yellow card) 100'
MF	18	(Romania) Marian Cristescu
MF	99	(Portugal) Bruno Madeira	(yellow card) 68'	(substituted off) 78'
MF	95	(Romania) Răzvan Grădinaru		(substituted off) 70'
MF	10	(Romania) Neluț Roșu	(yellow card) 85'
FW	30	(Romania) Marius Pena
Substitutes:
MF	7	(Romania) Tiberiu Serediuc	(substituted on) 70'
FW	17	(Romania) Florin Răsdan	(substituted on) 78'
FW	20	(Romania) Marian Constantinescu	(substituted on) 84'
DF	2	(Romania) Ștefan Bărboianu
MF	33	(Romania) Adrian Cristea
DF	3	(Romania) Cristian Albu
GK	93	(Romania) Florin Iacob
Manager:
(Romania) Emil Săndoi

MATCH OFFICIALS

- Assistant referees:
  - Adrian Radu Ghinguleac
  - Mircea Cristian Orbuleț
- Fourth official:
  - Adrian Viorel Cojocaru
- Additional assistant referees:

MATCH RULES

- 90 minutes.
- 30 minutes of extra-time if necessary.
- Penalty shoot-out if scores still level.
- Seven named substitutes.
- Maximum of three substitutions.

== See also ==
- 2016 Cupa României final
