= 2016 Cupa României final =

- Event: 2015–16 Cupa României
| Dinamo București | CFR Cluj |
| 2 | 2 |
- CFR Cluj won 5–4 after penalties
- Date: 17 May 2016
- Venue: Arena Națională, Bucharest
- Referee: Ovidiu Hațegan
- Attendance: 40,000

The Cupa României final was the final match of the 2015–16 Cupa României, played between Dinamo București and CFR Cluj. CFR Cluj won the match, 5–4 after penalties.

== Match ==
17 May 2016
21:30

| Dinamo București | 2–2 (a.e.t.) | CFR Cluj |
|---|---|---|
| Gnohéré 23' (pen.); Bicfalvi 36' | | Juan Carlos 47'; Cristian 89' |
Penalties
| Bicfalvi (penalty scored); Gnohéré (penalty scored); Anton (penalty scored); Lazăr (penalty scored); Rotariu (penalty missed) | 4–5 | (penalty scored) Cristian; (penalty scored) Lopes; (penalty scored) Beleck; (penalty scored) Petrucci; (penalty scored) Juan Carlos |

Arena Națională, Bucharest
Attendance: 40,000
Referee: Ovidiu Hațegan (Arad)

| Dinamo București | CFR Cluj |

| GK | 1 | (Lithuania) Vytautas Černiauskas |
| RB | 44 | (Romania) Sergiu Hanca | (yellow card) 33' | (substituted off) 73' |
| CB | 6 | (Croatia) Ante Puljić |
| CB | 17 | (Slovenia) Miha Mevlja |
| LB | 7 | (Romania) Steliano Filip |
| DM | 28 | (Romania) Paul Anton (c) |
| RM | 9 | (Romania) Dorin Rotariu |
| CM | 8 | (Romania) Eric Bicfalvi |
| CM | 20 | (Croatia) Antun Palić | | (substituted off) 83' |
| LM | 22 | (Netherlands) Romario Kortzorg | (yellow card) 67' | (substituted off) 75' |
| FW | 10 | (France) Harlem Gnohéré |
Substitutes:
| CB | 73 | (Romania) Andrei Marc | | (substituted in) 73' |
| RM | 93 | (Romania) Valentin Lazăr | | (substituted in) 75' |
| CB | 5 | (Romania) Ionuț Nedelcearu | (yellow card) 90+5' | (substituted in) 83' |
Manager:
(Romania) Mircea Rednic

| GK | 28 | (Romania) Alexandru Marc |
| RB | 22 | (Portugal) Tiago Lopes | (yellow card) 70' |
| CB | 6 | (Romania) Ionuț Larie |
| CB | 30 | (Romania) Andrei Mureșan | (yellow card) 23' |
| LB | 45 | (Portugal) Camora (c) |
| DM | 15 | (Croatia) Tomislav Gomelt | | (substituted off) 46' |
| DM | 10 | (Italy) Davide Petrucci | (yellow card) 86' |
| RW | 17 | (Croatia) Antonio Jakoliš | (yellow card) 119' |
| AM | 25 | (Spain) Juan Carlos |
| LW | 57 | (France) Bryan Nouvier | (yellow card) 79' | (substituted off) 80' |
| FW | 26 | (Romania) Cristian Bud | | (substituted off) 59' |
Substitutes:
| FW | 11 | (Spain) Cristian López | | (substituted in) 46' |
| FW | 19 | (Cameroon) Steve Beleck | | (substituted in) 59' |
| LB | 90 | (Portugal) Vítor Bruno | | (substituted in) 80' |
Manager:
(Portugal) Toni Conceição

MAN OF THE MATCH

- (Romania) Alexandru Marc (CFR Cluj)

MATCH OFFICIALS

- Assistant referees:
  - Octavian Șovre
  - Sebastian Gheorghe
- Fourth official:
  - Radu Ghinguleac
- Additional assistant referees:

MATCH RULES

- 90 minutes.
- 30 minutes of extra-time if necessary.
- Penalty shoot-out if scores still level.
- Seven named substitutes.
- Maximum of three substitutions.

== See also ==
- 2016 Cupa Ligii final
