= Gil Vermouth =

Israeli footballer (born 1985)

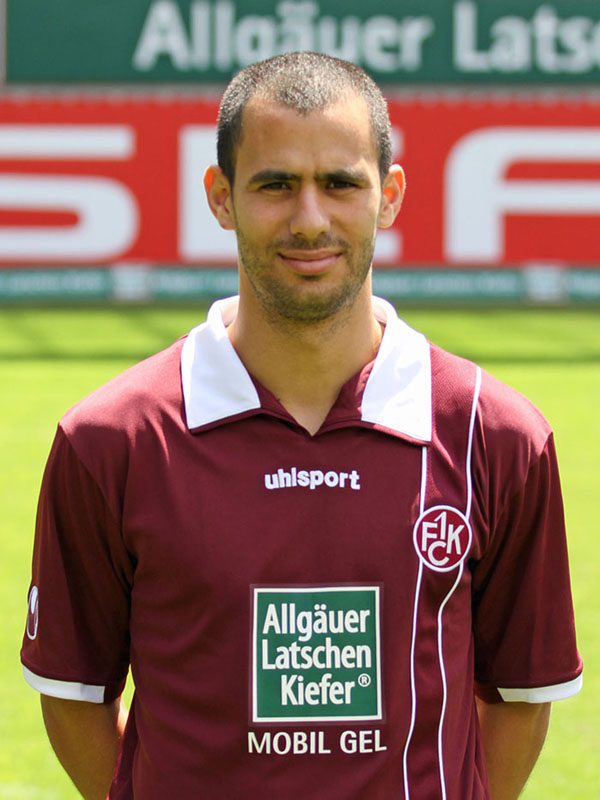
- Vermouth with 1. FC Kaiserslautern in 2011

Personal information
- Date of birth: 5 August 1985 (age 41)
- Place of birth: Kiryat Yam, Israel
- Height: 1.75 m (5 ft 9 in)
- Positions: Attacking midfielder; winger

Youth career
- Hapoel Haifa

Senior career*
Years	Team	Apps	(Gls)
2004–2005	Hapoel Haifa	31	(5)
2005–2007	Hapoel Tel Aviv	58	(5)
2007–2008	Gent	20	(1)
2008–2011	Hapoel Tel Aviv	97	(16)
2011	1. FC Kaiserslautern II	1	(0)
2011–2012	1. FC Kaiserslautern	4	(0)
2012	→ De Graafschap (loan)	15	(2)
2012–2015	Hapoel Tel Aviv	60	(12)
2015–2016	Maccabi Tel Aviv	18	(0)
2016–2018	Maccabi Haifa	60	(7)
2018–2020	Hapoel Haifa	60	(3)
Total		424	(51)

International career
2001	Israel U17	10	(3)
2003–2004	Israel U19	14	(7)
2003–2007	Israel U21	12	(1)
2009–2015	Israel	28	(2)
- * Club domestic league appearances and goals

Gil Vermouth (Hebrew: גיל "גילי" ורמוט; born 5 August 1985) is an Israeli former professional footballer who played as an attacking midfielder or winger.

== Club career ==
Vermouth is Jewish, and was born in Kiryat Yam, Israel.

Vermouth started his football career in Haifa and played until the age of 20 with the local Hapoel side.

In a 2011 statistics about the highest proportion of dribbles completed per 90 minutes, in the 2010–11 UEFA Champions League season, Vermouth was ranked first with 75% from an average of 24 dribble attempts.

On 28 May 2011, he signed a four-year contract with the German club 1. FC Kaiserslautern who paid a transfer fee of €750,000 to Hapoel. He was joined by his Hapoel teammate Itay Shechter who also signed with the club.

== Career statistics ==
=== International ===
Appearances and goals by national team and year
National team	Year	Apps	Goals
Israel	2009	3	0
Israel	2010	8	0
Israel	2011	4	0
Israel	2012	6	0
Israel	2013	–	
Israel	2014	5	2
Israel	2015	2	0
Total		28	2

Scores and results list Israel's goal tally first, score column indicates score after each Vermouth goal.

List of international goals scored by Gil Vermouth
No.	Date	Venue	Opponent	Score	Result	Competition	Ref.
1	1 June 2014	BBVA Compass Stadium, Houston, United States	Honduras	4–1	4–2	Road to Brazil	
2	16 November 2014	Sammy Ofer Stadium, Haifa, Israel	Bosnia and Herzegovina	1–0	3–0	UEFA Euro 2016 qualification	

== Honours ==
Hapoel Tel Aviv

- Israel State Cup: 2006, 2007, 2010, 2011
- Israeli Premier League: 2009–10

Gent

- Belgian Cup: runner-up 2008

Maccabi Tel Aviv

- Israeli Premier League: 2014–15
- Israel State Cup: 2014–2015

Maccabi Haifa

- Israel State Cup: 2015–16

Hapoel Haifa

- Israel State Cup: 2017–18
- Israel Super Cup: 2018

Individual

- Footballer of the Year in Israel: 2010
