= Road to Brazil =

Tournament details
- Country: United States
- Dates: May 29 – June 7, 2014
- Teams: 10

Tournament statistics
- Matches played: 7
- Goals scored: 19 (2.71 per match)
- Top goal scorer(s): (Bosnia and Herzegovina) Edin Džeko (Ivory Coast) Didier Drogba (Spain) David Villa (2 goals each)

The Road to Brazil is a series of international association football exhibition games that took place from May 29 to June 7, 2014, in the run up to the 2014 FIFA World Cup. The games have been organized by Soccer United Marketing, Major League Soccer's commercial division.

== Participants ==
Ten countries participated in the Road to Brazil series of matches, representing four continents – Europe, Africa, North America and South America. the teams that had qualified for the World Cup included the following: from Europe, defending champion Spain, Bosnia and Herzegovina and Greece; representing Africa were the African Cup of Nations champion Nigeria and powerhouse Ivory Coast; El Salvador and Honduras from CONCACAF.

Bolivia, El Salvador, Israel and Turkey also participated.

UEFA (5)

- Bosnia and Herzegovina
- Greece
- Israel
- Spain
- Turkey

CONMEBOL (1)

- Bolivia

CONCACAF (2)

- El Salvador
- Honduras

CAF (2)

- Ivory Coast
- Nigeria

== Schedule ==
Below is the schedule for the matches.

| Date | Time (ET) | Team #1 | Res. | Team #2 | City | Venue |
|---|---|---|---|---|---|---|
| May 29, 2014 | 8:00 PM | Honduras | 0–2 | Turkey | Washington D.C. | RFK Stadium |
| May 30, 2014 | 8:30 PM | Bosnia and Herzegovina | 2–1 | Ivory Coast | St. Louis | Edward Jones Dome |
| June 1, 2014 | 9:00 PM | Honduras | 2–4 | Israel | Houston | BBVA Compass Stadium |
| June 3, 2014 | 7:00 PM | Greece | 0–0 | Nigeria | Chester | PPL Park |
| June 4, 2014 | 9:00 PM | El Salvador | 1–2 | Ivory Coast | Frisco | Toyota Stadium |
| June 6, 2014 | 8:00 PM | Greece | 2–1 | Bolivia | Harrison | Red Bull Arena |
| June 7, 2014 | 4:00 PM | El Salvador | 0–2 | Spain | Landover | FedExField |

== Goalscorers ==
2 goals

- (Bosnia and Herzegovina) Edin Džeko
- (Ivory Coast) Didier Drogba
- (Spain) David Villa

1 goal

- (Bolivia) Rudy Cardozo
- (El Salvador) Arturo Alvarez
- (Greece) Kostas Katsouranis
- (Greece) Panagiotis Kone
- (Honduras) Carlos Costly
- (Honduras) Roger Espinoza
- (Israel) Omer Damari
- (Israel) Eran Zahavi
- (Israel) Gil Vermouth
- (Ivory Coast) Gervinho
- (Turkey) Mevlüt Erdinç
- (Turkey) Caner Erkin

1 own goal

- (Honduras) Maynor Figueroa (playing against Israel)
