= Bruno Madeira =

Portuguese footballer

Personal information
- Full name: Bruno Alexandre Marques Madeira
- Date of birth: 17 September 1984 (age 42)
- Place of birth: Viseu, Portugal
- Height: 1.80 m (5 ft 11 in)
- Position: Midfielder

Team information
- Current team: Carvalhais

Youth career
- 1994–2003: Académico Viseu

Senior career*
Years	Team	Apps	(Gls)
2003–2005	Académico Viseu	54	(6)
2005–2008	Chaves	85	(9)
2008–2009	Penafiel	32	(2)
2009–2010	Gil Vicente	29	(1)
2010–2011	Penafiel	25	(2)
2011–2014	Brașov	81	(4)
2015–2016	Concordia Chiajna	27	(1)
2016	→ Brașov (loan)	3	(0)
2016–2017	Académico Viseu	3	(0)
2017–2019	Vila de Silgueiros	26	(2)
2019–	Carvalhais	13	(0)
- * Club domestic league appearances and goals as of 1 March 2020

Bruno Alexandre Marques Madeira (born 17 September 1984) is a Portuguese professional footballer who plays for Carvalhais Futebol Clube as a defensive midfielder.

== Club career ==
Madeira was born in Viseu. After starting playing with hometown club Académico de Viseu F.C., he first reached the professional level in 2005–06, with G.D. Chaves in the second division, appearing in 30 games and scoring once during the season. He suffered relegation with the northern side in 2007.

In 2008, Madeira moved to another team in the third level, F.C. Penafiel, which he helped promote as champions. He subsequently returned to division two with Gil Vicente FC, re-joining his previous club for the 2010–11 campaign, in the same tier.

Madeira moved abroad in the summer of 2011, signing for FC Brașov in Romania and joining a host of compatriots at the Liga I side.
