= Risto Mitrevski =

Macedonian footballer

Personal information
- Full name: Risto Mitrevski
- Date of birth: 5 October 1991 (age 35)
- Place of birth: Skopje, North Macedonia
- Height: 1.87 m (6 ft 2 in)
- Position: Centre-back

Team information
- Current team: Persebaya Surabaya
- Number: 5

Youth career
- 2004–2009: Rabotnićki

Senior career*
Years	Team	Apps	(Gls)
2009–2011	Rabotnićki	5	(0)
2009	→ Pobeda (loan)	11	(0)
2010	→ Napredok (loan)	18	(0)
2011–2012	Teteks	35	(2)
2013–2014	Metalurg Skopje	43	(4)
2014–2015	Sarajevo	0	(0)
2015	→ Donji Srem (loan)	10	(1)
2015	Metalurg Skopje	12	(2)
2016–2017	Istra 1961	42	(1)
2017–2019	Hapoel Haifa	42	(1)
2019–2020	Enosis Neon Paralimni	8	(1)
2020	Alashkert	12	(2)
2021	Alashkert	4	(0)
2021	Sabah	19	(0)
2022–2025	Dewa United	93	(12)
2025–	Persebaya Surabaya	21	(2)

International career
2009	Macedonia U19	2	(0)
- * Club domestic league appearances and goals as of 2 May 2026

Risto Mitrevski (Macedonian: Ристо Митревски, born 5 October 1991) is a Macedonian professional footballer who plays as a centre-back for Super League club Persebaya Surabaya.

== Club career ==
Born in Skopje, he played for numerous clubs in the Macedonian First League between 2009 and 2013. On 31 May 2014 he signed with Bosnian Premier League side Sarajevo. During the winter break of the 2014–15 season he agreed to a loan to Serbian side Donji Srem. He made his debut in the 2014–15 Serbian SuperLiga on 21 February 2015, in a game of the round 16 against Borac Čačak.

On 4 January 2018, he signed with Hapoel Haifa.

On 11 June 2019, Mitrevski signed a contract with Liga I side Sepsi OSK

After having left Alashkert in October 2020, Mitrevski returned to Alashkert on 2 February 2021.

=== Dewa United ===
On 2 June 2022, Mitrevski signed a contract for Indonesian Liga 1 club Dewa United. Mitrevski became the first foreign player to sign for the club.

== International career ==
Mitrevski was member of the Macedonian U19 team.

== Career statistics ==
=== Club ===
Club	Season	League			Cup		Continental		Other		Total	
Club	Season	Division	Apps	Goals	Apps	Goals	Apps	Goals	Apps	Goals	Apps	Goals
Sabah	2021	Malaysia Super League	19	0	8	4	–		0	0	27	4
Dewa United	2022–23	Liga 1	33	7	–		–		0	0	33	7
Dewa United	2023–24	Liga 1	31	3	–		–		0	0	31	3
Dewa United	2024–25	Liga 1	29	2	–		–		0	0	29	2
Dewa United	Total		93	12	0	0	–		0	0	93	12
Persebaya Surabaya	2025–26	Super League	14	2	–		0	0	0	0	14	2
Career total			126	14	8	4	0	0	0	0	134	18

== Honours ==
Hapoel Haifa

- Israel State Cup: 2017–18
- Israel Super Cup: 2018

Persebaya Surabaya

- Piala Presiden: 2026
