= Ben Azubel =

Israeli professional footballer (born 1993)

Personal information
- Full name: Ben Azubel
- Date of birth: 19 September 1993 (age 33)
- Place of birth: Ganei Tikva, Israel
- Height: 1.91 m (6 ft 3 in)
- Position: Forward

Team information
- Current team: Ironi Modi'in
- Number: 30

Youth career
- Maccabi Petah Tikva
- Maccabi Tel Aviv
- Maccabi Haifa
- Hapoel Kfar Saba

Senior career*
Years	Team	Apps	(Gls)
2011–2013	Hapoel Kfar Saba	34	(4)
2013–2014	Hakoah Amidar Ramat Gan	35	(14)
2014–2015	Hapoel Nir Ramat HaSharon	30	(8)
2015–2016	Hapoel Petah Tikva	36	(15)
2016	Partizani Tirana	7	(1)
2016–2017	Hapoel Ashkelon	2	(0)
2017–2019	Hapoel Acre	32	(8)
2018–2019	→ Hapoel Haifa (loan)	28	(5)
2019–2020	Bnei Yehuda Tel Aviv	10	(0)
2020–2021	Maccabi Netanya	17	(0)
2021–2022	Hapoel Ra'anana	31	(16)
2022	Perth Glory	6	(0)
2023	BG Pathum United	9	(0)
2023	Hapoel Jerusalem	0	(0)
2023–2024	Hapoel Umm al-Fahm	6	(1)
2024	Trat	10	(2)
2024–2025	Hapoel Petah Tikva	15	(3)
2025	Hapoel Afula	15	(1)
2025–	Ironi Modi'in	21	(0)

International career
2011–2012	Israel U19	9	(2)
- * Club domestic league appearances and goals as of 24 June 2026

Ben Azubel (Hebrew: בן אז'ובל; born 19 September 1993) is an Israeli professional footballer who plays as a forward for Ironi Modi'in.

== Club career ==
=== Early years ===
Azubel started his football career with the Israeli youth teams of Maccabi Petah Tikva, Maccabi Tel Aviv, Maccabi Haifa, and Hapoel Kfar Saba.

=== Hapoel Kfar Saba ===
In September 2011, Azubel was promoted to the senior team of Hapoel Kfar Saba and played two years at the club.

=== Hakoah Amidar Ramat Gan ===
During the 2013–14 Liga Leumit season, Azubel scored 14 goals for Hakoah Amidar Ramat Gan.

=== Hapoel Nir Ramat HaSharon ===
Azubel joined Hapoel Nir Ramat HaSharon ahead of the 2014–15 Liga Leumit season. During the season, he scored eight goals, one of them being scored against his former club Hapoel Kfar Saba which he celebrated by pretending to fire guns, later saying that the fans insulted and his family. In May 2015, Azubel attracted interest from Israel Premier League giants Beitar Jerusalem.

=== Hapoel Petah Tikva ===
In July 2015, Azubel joined Hapoel Petah Tikva after their relegation to the Liga Leumit, signing a one-year contract with an option for an extra year. He was a notable player of the club, scoring 15 times in 36 games during the 2015–16 Liga Leumit season.

=== Partizani Tirana ===
After trialling with Beitar Jerusalem, including making an appearance in the 2016–17 Toto Cup Al, Azubel went overseas and became the first Israeli player to join an Albanian club when he signed with Partizani Tirana. He played seven league games for the club in which he scored one goal, and scored 4 goals in 4 cup games.

=== Hapoel Ashkelon ===
After scoring 37 goals in 3 Liga Leumit seasons, and following a stint overseas in Albania, Azubel returned to Israel and signed with Israel Premier League club Hapoel Ashkelon in December 2016.

=== Hapoel Acre ===
Following an unsuccessful season with Hapoel Ashkelon, in summer 2017, Azubel signed with Hapoel Acre on a three-year contract. He finished the 2017–18 Israeli Premier League season with eight goals, but could not prevent the club's relegation.

==== Loan to Hapoel Haifa ====
In August 2018, Azubel was courted by Maccabi Petah Tikva, but in the end joined Hapoel Haifa on a loan contract containing a buying option at the end of the season worth 600,000 shekel. At the end of the season, Hapoel Haifa decided not to buy Azubel, but he continued training with them which angered his parent club Hapoel Acre due to them not giving him permission to do so.

=== Bnei Yehuda Tel Aviv ===
In August 2019, Azubel joined Bnei Yehuda Tel Aviv on a two-year deal.

=== Maccabi Netanya ===
In October 2020, after impressing at training, Azubel joined Maccabi Netanya on a one-year contract with an extra three-year option. During the 2020–21 Israeli Premier League, he made 17 appearances, scoring only one goal.

=== Hapoel Ra'anana ===
In July 2021, Azubel joined Liga Leumit club Hapoel Ra'anana, together with defender Liad Elmaliach. During the 2021–22 Liga Leumit season, he scored 16 goals in 31 appearances and finished third top goalscorer of the competition. Despite this, the club finished the regular season in 15th place and were later relegated to Liga Alef. Following the season, Hapoel Ra'anana signed Azubel on a contract extension.

=== Perth Glory ===
Despite being contracted at Hapoel Ra'anana, in July 2022, Azubel went overseas a second time and signed a two-year contract with Australian A-League Men club Perth Glory.

=== BG Pathum United ===
Azubel left Perth Glory after making just 6 appearances for the club and signed for Thai club BG Pathum United.

== International career ==
In November 2011, Azubel debuted for the Israel national under-19 team, playing all three games of their 2012 UEFA European Championship first qualifying phase against Czech Republic, Serbia, and Lithuania and scoring in the victory against Czech Republic. In February 2012, he played and scored in a 1–1 friendly match draw with Italy at Acre Municipal Stadium. A few months later, he played in a pair of friendly match losses to Romania before playing in all three matches of Israel's 2012 UEFA European Championship second qualifying phase against Ukraine, Portugal, and Ireland.

== Personal life ==
Azubel was born in the Israeli town Ganei Tikva.
