= Idan Shemesh =

Israeli footballer

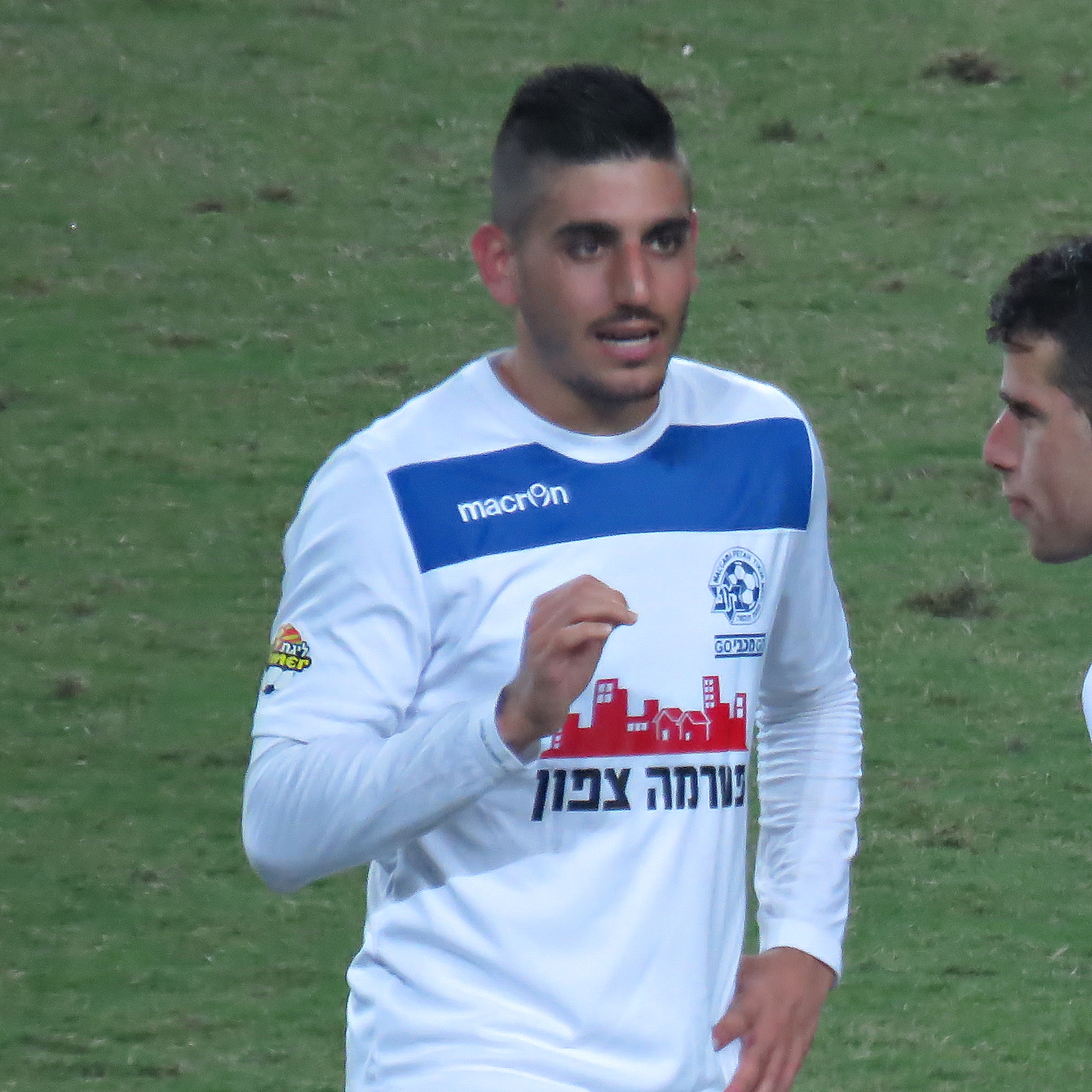

Personal information
- Full name: Idan Shemesh
- Date of birth: 6 August 1990 (age 36)
- Place of birth: Rishon LeZion, Israel
- Position: Forward

Team information
- Current team: Ironi Rosh Ha'ayin

Youth career
- Hapoel Rishon LeZion
- Maccabi Tel Aviv

Senior career*
| Years | Team | Apps | (Gls) |
| 2009–2012 | Hapoel Marmorek | 42 | (10) |
| 2012–2014 | Hapoel Katamon | 61 | (27) |
| 2014–2016 | Maccabi Petah Tikva | 42 | (5) |
| 2016–2018 | Bnei Sakhnin | 42 | (9) |
| 2018–2019 | Sektzia Ness Ziona | 15 | (4) |
| 2019 | Hapoel Haifa | 10 | (2) |
| 2019–2020 | Hapoel Ra'anana | 19 | (2) |
| 2020–2022 | Hapoel Jerusalem | 50 | (25) |
| 2022 | Hapoel Umm al-Fahm | 13 | (5) |
| 2022–2023 | Hapoel Petah Tikva | 26 | (10) |
| 2023–2024 | Ihud Bnei Shefa-'Amr | 20 | (2) |
| 2025–2026 | Gisin Petah Tikva | 2 | (3) |
| 2026– | Ironi Rosh Ha'ayin | | |
- * Club domestic league appearances and goals as of 15 June 2025

Idan Shemesh (Hebrew: עידן שמש; born 6 August 1990) is an Israeli professional footballer who plays for Israeli Division 5 (Gush Dan Group) side Ironi Rosh Ha'ayin.

== Club career ==
=== Early years ===
Shemesh started his football career with the youth teams of Hapoel Rishon LeZion and Maccabi Tel Aviv. On summer 2009 he loan to Hapoel Marmorek.

=== Maccabi Petah Tikva ===
On 7 July 2014 Shemesh signed with Maccabi Petah Tikva and he scored the first goal in the Israeli Premier League on 10 January 2015.

=== Bnei Sakhnin ===
On 4 September 2016 Shemesh signed with Bnei Sakhnin. He scored 6 goals on 2016–17 and 3 goals on 2017–18.

=== Hapoel Haifa ===
On 24 January 2019 Shemesh signed with Hapoel Haifa. Two days after, he scored the first goal in the team.
