= Yarden Cohen (footballer, born 1997) =

Israeli footballer

Personal information
- Full name: Yarden Cohen
- Date of birth: March 26, 1997 (age 29)
- Place of birth: Tirat Carmel, Israel
- Position: Left back

Team information
- Current team: Beitar Jerusalem
- Number: 16

Youth career
- 2006–2015: Maccabi Haifa
- 2015–2017: Hapoel Ra'anana

Senior career*
Years	Team	Apps	(Gls)
2016–2021	Hapoel Ra'anana	70	(2)
2020–2021	→ Maccabi Petah Tikva	29	(0)
2021–2025	Maccabi Petah Tikva	102	(7)
2025–	Beitar Jerusalem	30	(4)

International career^{‡}
2018–2020	Israel U21	4	(0)
2026–	Israel	1	(0)
- * Club domestic league appearances and goals as of 23 June 2026 ‡ National team caps and goals as of 27 March 2026

Yarden Cohen (Hebrew: ירדן כהן) is an Israeli footballer who plays for Beitar Jerusalem and the Israel national team.

== Career ==
Cohen started his career Maccabi Haifa's youth teams. At the age of 18 he joined the youth team of Hapoel Ra'anana. On 2 August 2016, Cohen made his senior debut in a 0–0 draw against Hapoel Tel Aviv in the Toto Cup.

On 9 March 2019, Cohen scored his debutgoal in the 2–2 draw against Hapoel Haifa.

On 3 August 2020, Cohen was loaned to Maccabi Petah Tikva.

== Career statistics ==
As of 1 June 2022.

Club	Season	League			State Cup		Toto Cup		Continental		Other		Total	
Club	Season	Division	Apps	Goals	Apps	Goals	Apps	Goals	Apps	Goals	Apps	Goals	Apps	Goals
Hapoel Ra'anana	2016–17	Israeli Premier League	9	0	2	0	4	0	0	0	0	0	15	0
Hapoel Ra'anana	2017–18	Israeli Premier League	11	0	2	0	0	0	0	0	0	0	13	0
Hapoel Ra'anana	2018–19	Israeli Premier League	24	2	0	0	4	0	0	0	0	0	28	2
Hapoel Ra'anana	2019–20	Israeli Premier League	26	0	3	0	0	0	0	0	0	0	29	0
Hapoel Ra'anana	Total		70	2	7	0	8	0	0	0	0	0	85	2
Maccabi Petah Tikva	2020–21	Israeli Premier League	29	0	1	0	3	0	0	0	0	0	33	0
Maccabi Petah Tikva	2021–22	Israeli Premier League	21	2	1	0	4	0	0	0	0	0	26	2
Maccabi Petah Tikva	Total		50	1	2	0	7	0	0	0	0	0	59	2
Career total			120	3	9	0	15	0	0	0	0	0	144	2
