= Assaf Tzur =

Israeli footballer (born 1998)

Personal information
- Full name: Assaf Tzur
- Date of birth: 28 August 1998 (age 28)
- Place of birth: Petah Tikva, Israel
- Height: 1.95 m (6 ft 5 in)
- Position: Goalkeeper

Team information
- Current team: Hapoel Tel Aviv
- Number: 22

Youth career
- Hapoel Petah Tikva
- Hapoel Ra'anana

Senior career*
Years	Team	Apps	(Gls)
2015–2016	Hapoel Petah Tikva	1	(0)
2016–2025	Hapoel Ra'anana	76	(0)
2020–2022	→ Anorthosis (loan)	6	(0)
2022–2025	→ Ironi Kiryat Shmona (loan)	68	(0)
2025–	Hapoel Tel Aviv	38	(0)

International career^{‡}
2017	Israel U19	3	(0)
2019–2021	Israel U21	15	(0)
2026–	Israel	2	(0)
- * Club domestic league appearances and goals as of 18 September 2026 ‡ National team caps and goals as of 20:37, 4 October 2026 (UTC)

Assaf Tzur (or Asaf Tzur, Hebrew: אסף צור; born 28 August 1998) is an Israeli footballer who plays as a goalkeeper for Hapoel Tel Aviv and the Israel national team.

== Early life ==
Tzur was born in Petah Tikva, Israel, to a family of Jewish background.

== Club career ==
Tzur is a product of Hapoel Petah Tikva Israeli academy, and in 2015 he became a permanent player in the senior team.

=== Hapoel Petah Tikva ===
He made his debut for the Israeli club Hapoel Petah Tikva senior team on 13 May 2016 in a match against Maccabi Herzliya.

=== Hapoel Ra'anana ===
On 2016, he moved to Hapoel Ra'anana Israeli academy, and he was promoted to the senior team on 1 June 2017.

Tzur made his debut for the Hapoel Ra'anana senior team on 6 June 2017 in a match against F.C. Ashdod.

He made 76 appearances with Hapoel Ra'anana.

=== Anorthosis Famagusta ===
On 14 September 2020, Tzur joined Cypriot First Division club Anorthosis Famagusta, on loan until the end of the season.

On 13 July 2021, Anorthosis Famagusta announced the renewal of the loan for another year.

== Career statistics ==
As of 1 June 2025

Appearances and goals by club, season and competition
Club	Season	League			National Cup		Europe		Other		Total	
Club	Season	Division	Apps	Goals	Apps	Goals	Apps	Goals	Apps	Goals	Apps	Goals
Hapoel Petah Tikva	2015–16	Liga Leumit	1	0	0	0	0	0	0	0	1	0
Hapoel Petah Tikva	Total		1	0	0	0	0	0	0	0	1	0
Hapoel Ra'anana	2016–17	Ligat Ha`Al	2	0	0	0	0	0	0	0	2	0
Hapoel Ra'anana	2017–18	Ligat Ha`Al	14	0	10	0	0	0	0	0	24	0
Hapoel Ra'anana	2018–19	Ligat Ha`Al	31	0	3	0	0	0	0	0	34	0
Hapoel Ra'anana	2019–20	Ligat Ha`Al	29	0	1	0	0	0	0	0	30	0
Hapoel Ra'anana	Total		76	0	14	0	0	0	0	0	90	0
Anorthosis (loan)	2020–21	Cypriot First Division	2	0	2	0	0	0	0	0	4	0
Anorthosis (loan)	2021–22	Cypriot First Division	1	0	5	0	6 (Note: Appearances in the UEFA Europa Conference League.)	0	0	0	12	0
Anorthosis (loan)	Total		3	0	7	0	6	0	0	0	16	0
Ironi Kiryat Shmona	2022–23	Israeli Premier League	3	0	0	0	0	0	1	0	4	0
Ironi Kiryat Shmona	2023–24	Liga Leumit	36	0	2	0	0	0	4	0	42	0
Ironi Kiryat Shmona	2024–25	Israeli Premier League	29	0	0	0	0	0	4	0	33	0
Ironi Kiryat Shmona	Total		68	0	2	0	0	0	9	0	79	0
Hapoel Tel Aviv	2025–26	Israeli Premier League	0	0	0	0	0	0	0	0	0	0
Hapoel Tel Aviv	Total		0	0	0	0	0	0	0	0	0	0
Career total			148	0	23	0	6	0	9	0	186	0

== Honours ==
Anorthosis

- Cypriot Cup: 2020–21
