= Eli Elbaz =

Israeli footballer

Eli Elbáz
Personal information
- Full name: Eli Elbaz
- Date of birth: January 21, 1992 (age 34)
- Place of birth: Kiryat Bialik, Israel
- Height: 1.79 m (5 ft 10 in)
- Position: Forward

Team information
- Current team: Hakoah Amidar Ramat Gan

Youth career
- Hapoel Haifa

Senior career*
| Years | Team | Apps | (Gls) |
| 2011–2017 | Hapoel Haifa | 29 | (2) |
| 2014–2015 | → Maccabi Ahi Nazareth (loan) | 32 | (12) |
| 2015 | → Ironi Tiberias (loan) | 11 | (1) |
| 2016–2017 | → Hapoel Kfar Saba (loan) | 29 | (9) |
| 2017–2018 | Apollon Smyrnis | 15 | (3) |
| 2018–2019 | Hapoel Haifa | 12 | (2) |
| 2019 | Maccabi Petah Tikva | 11 | (1) |
| 2019–2020 | Bnei Sakhnin | 18 | (2) |
| 2020–2021 | Sektzia Ness Ziona | 24 | (3) |
| 2021 | Hapoel Ashdod | 12 | (1) |
| 2021–2022 | Hapoel Kfar Shalem | 17 | (8) |
| 2022 | F.C. Tira | 0 | (0) |
| 2022–2023 | Maccabi Ironi Ashdod | 25 | (9) |
| 2023 | Sektzia Ness Ziona | 3 | (0) |
| 2023–2025 | Ironi Modi'in | 23 | (6) |
| 2025– | Hakoah Amidar Ramat Gan | 6 | (6) |
| 2025– | → Ramla (loan) | 9 | (5) |

International career
| 2008 | Israel U17 | 8 | (2) |
| 2009 | Israel U18 | 2 | (0) |
| 2010 | Israel U19 | 5 | (0) |
- * Club domestic league appearances and goals as of 1 December 2025

Eli Elbaz (Hebrew: אלי אלבז; born 21 January 1992) is an Israeli footballer currently playing for Hakoah Amidar Ramat Gan in the Liga Bet.

== Club career ==
Elbaz grew up in the Hapoel Haifa youth academy. He made his debut with the senior team on September 17, 2011. On January 8, 2014, he was loaned to Maccabi Ahi Nazareth.

=== Apollon Smyrni ===
On July 2, 2017, he signed a two-year contract with Super League Greece club Apollon Smyrnis for an undisclosed fee. He combined his official debut with a wonderful free-kick goal in the season's opener, a 1–1 away draw against Atromitos. On November 25, 2017, he opened the score in a dramatic 1–1 home win against Lamia. On December 2, he scored with an excellent solo in an eventual 3–1 away loss against Olympiacos.
