= Roei Shukrani =

Israeli footballer

Personal information
- Full name: Roei Shukrani
- Date of birth: June 26, 1990 (age 36)
- Place of birth: Karmi'el, Israel
- Position: Defensive midfielder

Team information
- Current team: Hapoel Acre
- Number: 55

Youth career
- Hapoel Haifa

Senior career*
Years	Team	Apps	(Gls)
2008–2015	Hapoel Haifa	68	(1)
2012–2013	→ Hapoel Nazareth Illit (loan)	33	(0)
2015–2016	Ironi Kiryat Shmona	27	(0)
2016–2018	Hapoel Ra'anana	57	(0)
2018–2019	Hapoel Haifa	1	(0)
2019	→ Hapoel Acre (loan)	15	(1)
2019–2022	Hapoel Nof HaGalil	87	(2)
2022–2023	Bnei Sakhnin	47	(1)
2023–2025	Maccabi Bnei Reineh	65	(1)
2025–	Hapoel Acre	30	(0)
- * Club domestic league appearances and goals as of 24 June 2026

Roei Shukrani (or Roee, Hebrew: רועי שוקרני; born 26 June 1990) is an Israeli footballer currently playing for Hapoel Acre

== Early life ==
Shukrani was born in Karmi'el, Israel, to a family of Sephardic Jewish descent.
