= Gabriel Tamaș =

Romanian footballer (born 1983)

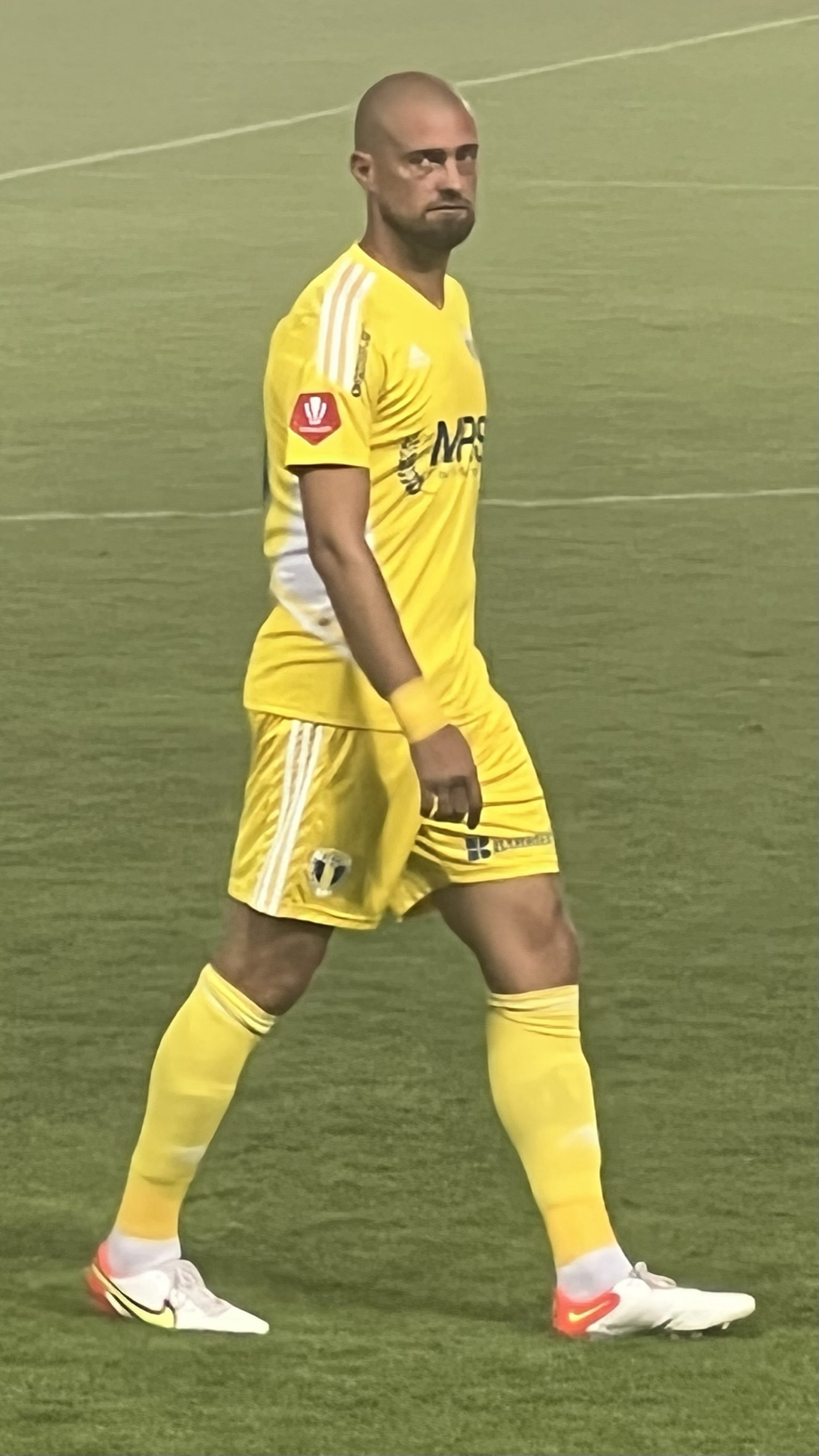
- Tamaș with Petrolul Ploiești in 2022

Personal information
- Full name: Gabriel Sebastian Tamaș
- Date of birth: 9 November 1983 (age 43)
- Place of birth: Brașov, Romania
- Height: 1.88 m (6 ft 2 in)
- Position: Defender

Team information
- Current team: ASA Târgu Mureș (executive director)

Youth career
- –1998: ICIM Brașov
- 1998–1999: FC Brașov
- 2000: Rapid București

Senior career*
Years	Team	Apps	(Gls)
1999	FC Brașov	1	(0)
2000–2002	Rapid București	0	(0)
2000–2002	→ Tractorul Brașov (loan)	34	(3)
2002–2003	Dinamo București	21	(3)
2003–2004	Galatasaray	6	(0)
2004–2007	Spartak Moscow	17	(0)
2005	→ Dinamo București (loan)	27	(1)
2006–2007	→ Celta Vigo (loan)	29	(0)
2007–2010	Auxerre	27	(0)
2008–2009	→ Dinamo București (loan)	34	(2)
2010	→ West Bromwich Albion (loan)	23	(2)
2010–2013	West Bromwich Albion	45	(0)
2013	CFR Cluj	0	(0)
2014	Doncaster Rovers	14	(0)
2014–2015	Watford	7	(0)
2015	Steaua București	10	(0)
2015–2016	Cardiff City	0	(0)
2016–2017	Steaua București	40	(1)
2017–2019	Hapoel Haifa	56	(3)
2019–2020	Astra Giurgiu	22	(1)
2020–2021	Universitatea Cluj	9	(1)
2021–2022	Voluntari	51	(1)
2022	Petrolul Ploiești	13	(2)
2023	Concordia Chiajna	18	(1)
Total		504	(21)

International career
1998	Romania U16	5	(0)
2001	Romania U19	6	(0)
2002–2005	Romania U21	9	(1)
2003–2018	Romania	67	(3)

Managerial career
- 2024–2025: Concordia Chiajna (sporting director)
- 2026–: ASA Târgu Mureș (executive director)
- * Club domestic league appearances and goals

Gabriel Sebastian Tamaș (Romanian pronunciation: [ɡabriˈel ˈtamaʃ]; born 9 November 1983) is a Romanian former professional footballer who played as a centre-back, currently executive director at Liga II club ASA Târgu Mureș.

Tamaș started out as a senior at FC Brașov in the 1998–99 season, and was a journeyman who competed professionally in Turkey, Russia, Spain, France, England, and Israel, apart from his own country. He won seven domestic trophies playing for rival sides Dinamo București and Steaua București in Romania, with which he had multiple spells, and his honours also include the Israel State Cup and the Israeli Super Cup with Hapoel Haifa.

A Romanian international for 15 years, Tamaș totalled 67 caps and three goals for the nation and was selected in the squad for the UEFA Euro 2008.

== Club career ==
=== Early career ===
Tamaș was born on 9 November 1983 in Brașov, Romania and began playing junior-level football at local club ICIM Brașov. He started his senior career in the 1998–99 Divizia B season with FC Brașov, making his debut when coach Cornel Țălnar sent him for the last minutes of a match against Sportul Studențesc București. That would remain his only appearance for FC Brașov as he went together with teammate Tiberiu Ghioane to play for first-league team Rapid București. There, he did not get to make his debut as coach Anghel Iordănescu sent him back to the second league on loan at Tractorul Brașov for two seasons.

=== Dinamo București and Galatasaray ===
In July 2002, Tamaș became free of contract and coach Țălnar took him to Dinamo București. There, he made his Divizia A debut on 17 August, when coach Ion Moldovan sent him to replace Dan Alexa in the 79th minute of a 5–0 win over Ceahlăul Piatra Neamț. He scored his first goal in the competition on 20 October in a 2–0 victory against Național București. By the end of the season, he won the first trophy of his career when coach Ioan Andone used him for the first 71 minutes, then replaced him with Ovidiu Burcă in the 1–0 win against Național in the Cupa României final.

Tamaș was transferred in the summer of 2003 by Dinamo to Galatasaray for €2 million. His Süper Lig debut took place on 9 August 2003 under coach Fatih Terim in a 2–1 home victory against Diyarbakırspor. He spent only half a season alongside fellow Romanians Florin Bratu and Ovidiu Petre with the Cim Bom Bom side, being used rarely in the league by Terim but making four appearances in the Champions League group stage, including a 2–0 home win over Juventus.

=== Spartak Moscow and loans ===
In January 2004, Tamaș moved to Russian Premier League club Spartak Moscow, which paid Galatasaray €3.5 million for his transfer. He made his Russian Premier League debut on 13 March 2004 under coach Nevio Scala in a 2–2 derby draw against Dynamo Moscow. Tamaș spent half a season with The Gladiators, playing regularly with compatriots Adrian Iencsi and Florin Șoavă until January 2005, when he was loaned to Dinamo București because Spartak bought Nemanja Vidić in his place. At the end of the 2004–05 season he won the Cupa României with The Red Dogs, coach Andone using him the full 90 minutes in the 1–0 victory against Farul Constanța in the final. Subsequently, he helped the team earn its first Supercupa României, with Andone using him the first half, replacing him for the second half with Lucian Goian in the 3–2 victory against rivals Steaua București. Tamaș also helped them eliminate Everton with a historical 5–2 on aggregate, reaching the group stage of the 2005–06 UEFA Cup. After Spartak sold Vidić to Manchester United, he returned to play for them for a short while. Afterwards, he was loaned again, this time to Celta Vigo which needed a replacement for Sergio. Tamaș made his La Liga debut on 17 September 2006 when coach Fernando Vázquez sent him in the 83rd minute to replace Pablo Contreras in a 2–1 away loss to Espanyol. He appeared regularly for Celta during the 2006–07 season. He helped them eliminate the team he belonged to, Spartak Moscow, in the round of 32 of the UEFA Cup, being eliminated by Werder Bremen in the following round.

=== Auxerre and loans ===
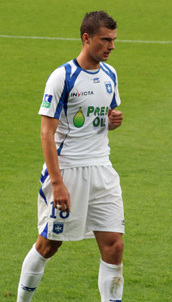
Tamaș playing for French club Auxerre in the 2007–08 season.

At the start of the following campaign, Tamaș was bought for €3 million by Ligue 1 club Auxerre, where he played alongside Romanians Daniel Niculae and Vlad Munteanu. He made his Ligue 1 debut on 15 August 2007 when coach Jean Fernandez sent him in the 90th minute to replace Thomas Kahlenberg in a 3–0 away loss to Strasbourg. After playing regularly for a year in France, he returned to Dinamo which paid €400,000 for a season-long loan. Subsequently, his deal was extended for another year and was also elected captain by his teammates. Tamaș scored the only goal of a victory in a derby against Steaua, played at the Ghencea stadium, and then he scored in a 1–0 win over Sturm Graz in the 2009–10 Europa League group stage.

His third stint at Dinamo was interrupted prematurely in December 2009, and he signed on 1 January 2010 to go on loan for West Bromwich Albion which paid Auxerre €1 million. Tamaș made his debut under coach Roberto Di Matteo on 8 January, in a 1–3 Football League Championship loss to Nottingham Forest. He scored his first goal in a 1–1 draw at Reading, on 27 March. The team finished the season in second place, thus earning promotion to the Premier League.

=== England and Steaua București ===
On 19 May 2010, Tamaș signed a three-year contract with the option of another year with West Bromwich Albion which paid a fee of £800,000 to Auxerre for his permanent transfer. He made his Premier League debut in a heavy 6–0 away loss to Chelsea on 14 August. However, he delivered an impressive performance in his first top-flight season, and at one point, the club gave him a raise, manager Di Matteo stating: "Gabi is an important figure at West Bromwich. Both on the field and off it". His performances in 2010 earned him the fifth place in the Romanian Footballer of the Year award. On 11 September 2011, he elbowed James Vaughan in the face inside his own penalty area in a match against Norwich City; the referee gave no penalty, but Tamaș was handed a three-match ban for violent conduct. On 26 September 2012, he opened the scoring for West Brom in the third minute of an eventual 2–1 loss to Liverpool in the League Cup. After he ended his playing career in 2023, he said it was the most beautiful moment of his career. He terminated his contract with WBA by mutual consent in September 2013. The following month, he spent only a week at CFR Cluj, having been dismissed due to an incident in a bar.

On 17 January 2014, Tamaș remained in England, signing for Football League Championship side Doncaster Rovers. Upon the expiry of his contract, he moved to Watford in the same league on a one-year agreement effective from 1 July 2014. After nursing a cruciate knee ligament injury for several months, he left Watford in January 2015. On 15 January 2015, Tamaș signed a two-year contract with Steaua București—the cross-town rival of his former club Dinamo, helping the team win The Treble. He was used by coach Constantin Gâlcă in ten league games in the remainder of the campaign. Subsequently, he played the entire match in the 3–0 win over Pandurii Târgu Jiu in the Cupa Ligii final. He was also sent in the 77th minute to replace Fernando Varela in another 3–0 victory against Universitatea Cluj in the Cupa României final.

On 26 August 2015, Tamaș returned to the Football League Championship with Cardiff City on a one-year contract with the option of a further year. During the first half of the season, Tamaș only appeared for the development squad and was not involved in the first-team trainings starting from November, resulting in his frustration and his claim that he wanted to leave the Welsh capital. He eventually made his debut in a 0–1 FA Cup loss to Shrewsbury Town on 10 January. On 1 February 2016, Cardiff City announced that his contract was terminated by mutual consent.

Tamaș then returned to Steaua București on the condition that he would address his alcohol issues and attend Church on Sundays. He helped the club win the 2015–16 Cupa Ligii, being used by coach Laurențiu Reghecampf the entire match in the 2–1 extra time victory in the final against Concordia Chiajna. In the following season he played with "The Red-Blues" in the group stage of the Europa League where he scored the decisive goal of a 2–1 home win over Osmanlıspor. In the domestic league, he was an important player of the team, but on 18 March in the 17th minute of an eventual 1–0 loss to Viitorul Constanța he received a red card after a hard tackle on Florin Purece. Afterwards he was no longer used in the remaining games of the championship which was eventually lost to Viitorul and he left the team.

=== Hapoel Haifa ===
In June 2017, Tamaș was signed by Israeli team Hapoel Haifa, where he was wanted by coach Nir Klinger. His Israeli Premier League debut took place on 19 August 2017 in a 3–1 home victory against Hapoel Ashkelon. By the end of his first season, he won the Israel State Cup, playing the entire match in the 3–1 victory in the final against Beitar Jerusalem. Subsequently, Tamaș won the 2018 Super Cup, equalizing in the 28th minute of the 1–1 draw against Hapoel Be'er Sheva, then scoring with a panenka at the penalty shoot-out, which his side won 5–4. He netted his first league goal on 15 December 2018, which was the decisive one in a 2–1 victory against Maccabi Netanya.

=== Late career ===
Tamaș spent the last years of his career in Romania, first spending one season with Liga I side Astra Giurgiu, then he went for half a season at Liga II team Universitatea Cluj. Subsequently, he returned to first league football for one and a half years at Voluntari and then half a season at Petrolul Ploiești. After about one year spent in Liga II at Concordia Chiajna, in October 2023 at age 39, Tamaș suddenly decided to retire. He stated that he could go on physically but not psychologically, claiming disappointment with the level of Romanian football. He also mentioned that Dinamo was the club he liked the most playing for.

== International career ==
Tamaș played 67 matches and scored three goals for Romania. He was handed his debut by Anghel Iordănescu on 12 February 2003, coming on as a substitute for Cosmin Contra in the 90+1st minute of a 2–1 friendly defeat of Slovakia. After appearing in five games in the 2006 FIFA World Cup qualifiers, manager Victor Pițurcă chose him as a starter in all ten matches of the successful UEFA Euro 2008 qualifiers, where Romania finished first in its group. He scored two goals, one in a 2–1 away victory against Slovenia and one in a 6–1 home win over Albania.

On 25 March 2008, Tamaș was decorated by Romanian president Traian Băsescu for his performances in the Euro 2008 qualifiers; he received Medalia "Meritul Sportiv" – ("The Sportive Merit" Medal) class III. Pițurcă used him for the entirety of all three games in the final tournament which were draws against France and Italy, and a loss to the Netherlands, as his side failed to progress from their group.

Tamaș played four games during the 2010 World Cup qualifiers, and scored his last goal for the national team in a 3–2 friendly loss to Ukraine in Lviv, on 29 May 2010. In the following years, he amassed eight caps in the Euro 2012 qualifiers, four during the 2014 World Cup qualifiers and two in the Euro 2016 qualifiers. His last two appearances were in 2018, being called up by his former teammate Cosmin Contra for the inaugural season of the Nations League. Tamaș played in a 2–1 away victory over Lithuania and in a goalless draw against Serbia, receiving a red card in the 44th minute of the latter game.

== After retirement ==
In 2025, Tamaș and Dan Alexa won season 8 of Asia Express, a reality TV show that originally airs in Romania, which was held in the Philippines, Vietnam, and South Korea. Subsequently, in 2026, Tamaș won the reality TV show Survivor România.

== Controversies ==
Tamaș was known for his controversial lifestyle outside the football pitch, his numerous nights of drinking out and provoking fights or material damages often making the headlines of Romanian media.

In October 2003, Tamaș was involved in a fight in a nightclub in his native Brașov, with the man he fought needing hospitalization and a surgery to the face. In November 2004, he devastated a Poiana Brașov restaurant together with a group of friends after they were denied entrance. In November 2005, after playing for Dinamo București in a 1–1 draw with Jiul Petroșani, Tamaș went to party in a nightclub in Brașov and caused a scandal, nearly starting a fight.

On 14 February 2009, Tamaș was expelled to the reserves of Dinamo București after drinking alcohol and causing a scandal in the team's training camp in Turkey. In July 2010, he got intoxicated and started a fight with the waiters at his brother's wedding. In December that year, he physically abused his then-girlfriend in a nightclub in Bucharest after accusing her of infidelity.

In June 2011, he overslept and missed the flight for the national team's tournament in South America after partying until dawn in a nightclub in Poiana Brașov. On 11 August that year, Tamaș and his teammate Adrian Mutu were excluded by coach Victor Pițurcă from the Romania squad after they were caught drinking in a bar the previous night, while the national team was preparing for a friendly match against San Marino. Their suspension was lifted after three games.

In May 2013, after partying in a Bucharest nightclub, Tamaș tried to enter a block of flats for shelter. The cleaning lady denied him access, so he broke in the door, went up to the first floor and fell asleep on the stairway. He was taken to the police station, where he caused a scandal by yelling at and insulting the officers. He received an eight-month suspended sentence for his acts.

In October 2013, Tamaș was drinking in a bar in Bucharest with his national team colleague Daniel Pancu, and later that night they started fighting each other. One week later, he signed a one-year contract with CFR Cluj, but the club dismissed him shortly after he and his teammate Florin Costea caused an incident in a local pub. On the night of the 2014 New Year's Eve, Tamaș got into a fight in the lobby of a restaurant in Brașov. Also in the same year, while waiting in line at a pizzeria from Doncaster, he got punched by someone for no reason below his right eye, his zygomatic bone being broken. Subsequently, he had to undergo a surgery, then for a while he wore a mask during training sessions and games.

While he was at Steaua București, in February 2015 he got into a fight with teammate Alexandru Bourceanu and his brother at Bourceanu's 12th wedding anniversary. His first spell at Steaua ended when he was dismissed after missing a training session following a night out; manager Mirel Rădoi stated that Tamaș lied to him by claiming that his phone alarm did not ring.

On 23 March 2019, during his time in Israel, Tamaș was arrested by the police after driving his car at 205 km/h with 0.66 mg of alcohol per liter of exhaled air. He spent a week in jail, after which he remained under house arrest for a month and was sentenced to two months of community service.

In October 2022, while drinking along with several Petrolul Ploiești teammates at a restaurant, Tamaș called their manager Nicolae Constantin on his phone and criticized his tactics. He also cursed chairman Costel Lazăr, sporting director Claudiu Tudor and the fans of Petrolul, and Constantin sent the recording to the leaders of supporter groups. The recording found its way into the media and Tamaș left the club the following days.

== Career statistics ==
=== Club ===
Appearances and goals by club, season and competition
Club	Season	League			National cup (Note: Includes Cupa României, Russian Cup, Turkish Cup, Copa del Rey, Coupe de France, FA Cup, Israel State Cup)		League cup (Note: Includes Coupe de la Ligue, League Cup, Cupa Ligii, Toto Cup)		Europe		Other		Total	
Club	Season	Division	Apps	Goals	Apps	Goals	Apps	Goals	Apps	Goals	Apps	Goals	Apps	Goals
FC Brașov	1998–99	Divizia B	1	0	–		–		–		–		1	0
Tractorul Brașov (loan)	2000–01	Divizia B	15	1	0	0	–		–		–		15	1
Tractorul Brașov (loan)	2001–02	Divizia B	19	2	0	0	–		–		–		19	2
Tractorul Brașov (loan)	Total		34	3	0	0	–		–		–		34	3
Dinamo București	2002–03	Divizia A	21	3	7	0	–		0	0	0	0	28	3
Dinamo București	2003–04	Divizia A	–		–		–		–		0	0	0	0
Dinamo București	Total		21	3	7	0	–		0	0	0	0	28	3
Galatasaray	2003–04	Süper Lig	6	0	2	0	–		5 (Note: Appearances in UEFA Champions League)	0	–		13	0
Spartak Moscow	2004	Russian Premier League	14	0	2	0	–		3 (Note: Appearances in UEFA Intertoto Cup)	0	1 (Note: Appearances in Russian Super Cup)	0	19	0
Spartak Moscow	2006	Russian Premier League	3	0	2	0	–		–		0	0	5	0
Spartak Moscow	2007	Russian Premier League	0	0	0	0	–		–		–		0	0
Spartak Moscow	Total		17	0	4	0	–		3	0	1	0	25	0
Dinamo București (loan)	2004–05	Divizia A	13	0	3	0	–		–		–		16	0
Dinamo București (loan)	2005–06	Divizia A	14	1	2	0	–		8 (Note: Appearances in UEFA Cup)	0	1 (Note: Appearance in Supercupa României)	0	25	1
Dinamo București (loan)	Total		27	1	5	0	–		8	0	1	0	41	1
Celta Vigo (loan)	2006–07	La Liga	29	0	2	0	–		9	0	–		40	0
Auxerre	2007–08	Ligue 1	27	0	1	0	3	0	–		–		31	0
Dinamo București (loan)	2008–09	Liga I	22	0	1	0	–		2	0	–		25	0
Dinamo București (loan)	2009–10	Liga I	12	2	2	0	–		7 (Note: Appearances in UEFA Europa League)	1	–		21	3
Dinamo București (loan)	Total		34	2	3	0	–		9	1	–		46	3
West Bromwich Albion (loan)	2009–10	Championship	23	2	3	0	–		–		–		26	2
West Bromwich Albion	2010–11	Premier League	26	0	0	0	0	0	–		–		26	0
West Bromwich Albion	2011–12	Premier League	8	0	2	0	0	0	–		–		10	0
West Bromwich Albion	2012–13	Premier League	11	0	2	0	2	1	–		–		15	1
West Bromwich Albion	Total		68	2	7	0	2	1	–		–		77	3
CFR Cluj	2013–14	Liga I	–		–		–		–		–		–	
Doncaster Rovers	2013–14	Championship	14	0	–		–		–		–		14	0
Watford	2014–15	Championship	7	0	0	0	2	0	–		–		9	0
Steaua București	2014–15	Liga I	10	0	2	0	1	0	–		–		13	0
Steaua București	2015–16	Liga I	0	0	–		–		1	0	1	0	18	0
Steaua București	Total		10	0	2	0	1	0	1	0	1	0	15	0
Cardiff City	2015–16	Championship	0	0	1	0	–		–		–		1	0
Steaua București	2015–16	Liga I	12	0	2	0	2	0	–		–		16	0
Steaua București	2016–17	Liga I	28	1	0	0	3	0	10 (Note: Four appearances in UEFA Champions League, six appearances and one goal in UEFA Europa League)	1	-		41	2
Steaua București	Total		40	1	2	0	5	0	10	1	–		57	2
Hapoel Haifa	2017–18	Israeli Premier League	33	1	5	1	4	0	–		–		42	2
Hapoel Haifa	2018–19	Israeli Premier League	23	2	1	0	1	0	3	0	1 (Note: Appearance in Israel Super Cup)	0	29	2
Hapoel Haifa	Total		56	3	6	1	5	0	3	0	1	0	71	4
Astra Giurgiu	2019–20	Liga I	22	1	1	0	–		–		–		23	1
Universitatea Cluj	2020–21	Liga II	9	1	1	0	–		–		–		10	1
Voluntari	2020–21	Liga I	16	0	–		–		–		2 (Note: Appearances in Liga I promotion/relegation play-offs)	0	18	0
Voluntari	2021–22	Liga I	35	1	4	0	–		–		–		39	1
Voluntari	Total		51	1	4	0	–		–		2	0	57	1
Petrolul Ploiești	2022–23	Liga I	13	2	1	0	–		–		–		14	2
Concordia Chiajna	2022–23	Liga II	9	1	–		–		–		–		9	1
Concordia Chiajna	2023–24	Liga II	9	0	0	0	–		–		–		9	0
Concordia Chiajna	Total		18	1	0	0	–		–		–		18	1
Career total			504	21	49	1	18	1	48	2	6	0	625	25

=== International ===
Appearances and goals by national team and year
National team	Year	Apps	Goals
Romania
Romania	2003	3	0
Romania	2004	1	0
Romania	2005	7	0
Romania	2006	8	0
Romania	2007	10	2
Romania	2008	10	0
Romania	2009	3	0
Romania	2010	9	1
Romania	2011	6	0
Romania	2012	3	0
Romania	2013	3	0
Romania	2014	1	0
Romania	2015	1	0
Romania	2016	0	0
Romania	2017	0	0
Romania	2018	2	0
Total		67	3

List of international goals scored by Gabriel Tamaș
#	Date	Venue	Opponent	Score	Result	Competition
1	2 June 2007	Arena Petrol, Celje, Slovenia	Slovenia	1–0	2–1	UEFA Euro 2008 qualifying
2	1 November 2007	Național Stadium, Bucharest, Romania	Albania	2–0	6–1	UEFA Euro 2008 qualifying
3	29 May 2010	Ukraina Stadium, Lviv, Ukraine	Ukraine	1–1	2–3	Friendly

== Honours ==
Dinamo București

- Cupa României: 2002–03, 2004–05
- Supercupa României: 2005

Spartak Moscow

- Russian Cup runner-up: 2005–06
- Russian Super Cup runner-up: 2004, 2006

Steaua București

- Liga I: 2014–15
- Cupa României: 2014–15
- Supercupa României runner-up: 2015
- Cupa Ligii: 2014–15, 2015–16

Hapoel Haifa

- Israel State Cup: 2017–18
- Israeli Super Cup: 2018

Voluntari

- Cupa României runner-up: 2021–22

Individual

- Romanian Footballer of the Year (fifth place): 2010
- Gazeta Sporturilor Romania Player of the Month: December 2021
