= Thanasis Papazoglou =

Greek footballer (born 1988)

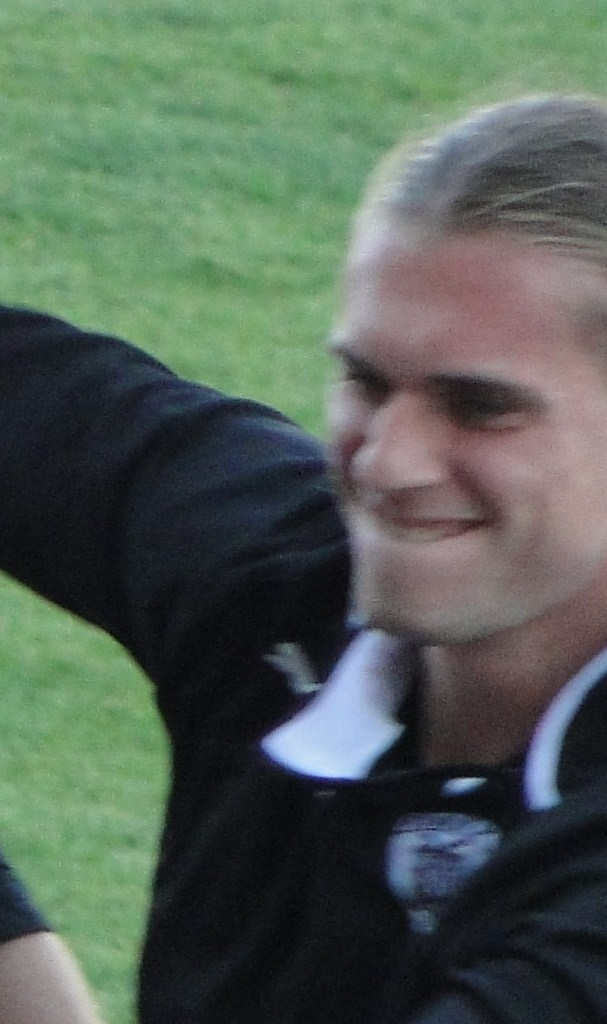
- Papazoglou with PAOK in 2010

Personal information
- Full name: Athanasios Papazoglou
- Date of birth: 30 March 1988 (age 38)
- Place of birth: Thessaloniki, Greece
- Height: 1.95 m (6 ft 5 in)
- Position: Striker

Team information
- Current team: AOK Agios Athanasios
- Number: 9

Youth career
- 2001–2006: Aris

Senior career*
Years	Team	Apps	(Gls)
2006–2009	Aris	14	(2)
2009–2012	PAOK	56	(9)
2011	→ Asteras Tripolis (loan)	9	(0)
2012–2014	OFI	65	(20)
2014	Olympiacos	0	(0)
2014–2015	Atromitos	29	(4)
2015–2018	Kortrijk	60	(10)
2017	→ Roda (loan)	11	(1)
2017–2018	→ Aalesund (loan)	13	(3)
2018–2019	Hapoel Haifa	12	(1)
2019	Dinamo București	14	(4)
2019	Voluntari	11	(1)
2020	AEL	13	(0)
2020–2021	Xanthi	20	(2)
2021–2022	Rodos	15	(1)
2022–2024	Thermaikos	17	(9)
2025–2026	Asteras Agios Nikolaos		
2026–	AOK Agios Athanasios		

International career^{‡}
2007	Greece U19	4	(1)
2008–2010	Greece U21	9	(0)
2016	Greece	3	(0)
- * Club domestic league appearances and goals as of 22 November 2025 ‡ National team caps and goals as of 22 November 2025

Thanasis Papazoglou (Greek: Θανάσης Παπάζογλου; born 30 March 1988), commonly known also as Sakis Papazoglou, is a Greek professional footballer who plays as a striker.

== Club career ==
=== Aris ===
Papazoglou made his professional debut for Aris in the 2007–08 Super League Greece. He was promoted to the first team by coach Dušan Bajević. On 8 November 2007, he scored 2 goals in a 3–0 win against Red Star Belgrade in the Europa League. After his injuries kept him from maintaining his form, Papazoglou lost coach Mazinho's confidence and was sold to fellow Super League side PAOK.

On 1 June 2009, Papazoglou signed a 4-year contract with PAOK. He was loaned to Asteras Tripolis for the 2010–11 season.

=== OFI ===
On 8 August 2012, Papazoglou signed a two-year contract with OFI. After some good displays for his new club, he was linked to a number of teams from England. At the end of the 2013–14 season, Papazoglou terminated his contract with OFI in order to move to Olympiacos, but only played in friendly games for the latter.

On 8 August 2014 Papazoglou signed a two-year contract with Greek club Atromitos. He scored his first goal for them two weeks later in a 1–0 home victory against Platanias.

=== Kortrijk ===
In the summer of 2015 he moved to Belgian First Division A club Kortrijk, and later signed a three-year contract for an undisclosed fee. On 25 July 2015, he made his debut for Kortrijk as he scored the only goal in a 2–1 away loss at Club Brugge KV.

On 17 October 2015, in a game against Stergos Marinos's club Sporting Charleroi he scored the first goal in a 2–0 home win. On 22 November 2015, he gave the lead to his club in a final 1–1 away draw against Standard Liège. On 28 November 2015, he scored his fifth goal in the League in a 3–1 home win against Waasland-Beveren. On 23 April 2016, he scored a goal and gave an assist in a 5–0 home win against Waasland-Beveren. He started the 2016–17 season as a starter, but gradually lost his place in the starting eleven, usually playing a few minutes as a late substitute.

On 28 December 2016, it was announced that Papazoglou was sent on loan to Dutch Eredivisie side Roda Kerkrade for the rest of the season.

On 28 July 2017, Papazoglou joined Norwegian Eliteserien side Aalesunds FK on loan from Kortrijk for the rest of the season. On 6 August 2017, he made his league debut with a penalty goal in a 3–3 home draw against SK Brann. A week later Papazoglou helped Aalesunds gain a point in the last minute of the game in a 1–1 home draw against Viking FK.

=== Hapoel Haifa ===
In the summer of 2018 Papazoglou moved to Israeli club Hapoel Haifa. He immediately impressed manager Nir Klinger and was included on the Europa League list. On 26 July 2018, he made his first appearance for Hapoel coming in as a substitute and scoring the only goal in a 1–1 draw against Fimleikafélag Hafnarfjarðar in the Europa League. On 29 July 2018, he won the Israel Super Cup after a penalty shoot-out win against Hapoel Be'er Sheva F.C.

=== Dinamo București ===
On 1 February 2019 Papazoglou signed a one-and-a-half-year contract with Romanian club Dinamo București. On 10 July 2019, Papazoglou was released by the club.

=== Voluntari ===
On 18 July 2019 Papazoglou signed a year contract with Romanian club FC Voluntari. On 8 January 2020, Voluntari mutually agreed to terminate the contracts of four players: Athanasios Papazoglou, Constantin Nica, Avtandil Ebralidze and Martin Harrer.

=== AEL ===
On 3 January 2020, Papazoglou signed a year-and-a-half contract with Greek club AEL for an undisclosed fee.

=== Xanthi F.C. ===
On 3 October 2020, Papazoglou signed a contract with Greek club Xanthi for an undisclosed fee.

== International career ==
Papazoglou played for Greece U19 and Greece U21 from 2007 to 2010 respectively. He was a part of the Greece U-19 selection at the 2007 U-19 European Championship in Austria, where Greece eventually lost to Spain in the final. On 29 March 2016, Papazoglou made his full debut for the Greece national team in a 2–3 home loss against Iceland, coming in as a substitute.

== Career statistics ==
As of match played 19 May 2021

Appearances and goals by club, season and competition
Club	Season	League			Cup		Continental		Total	
Club	Season	Division	Apps	Goals	Apps	Goals	Apps	Goals	Apps	Goals
Aris	2007–08	Super League Greece	10	0	1	0	1 (Note: Appearances in the Europa League)	2	12	2
Aris	2008–09	Super League Greece	2	0	0	0	0	0	2	0
Aris	Total		12	0	1	0	1	2	14	2
PAOK	2009–10	Super League Greece	22	3	3	2	1	0	26	5
PAOK	2010–11	Super League Greece	14	2	1	0	3 (Note: One appearance in the Champions League and two in the Europa League)	0	18	2
PAOK	2011–12	Super League Greece	14	3	0	0	3	0	17	3
PAOK	Total		50	8	4	2	7	0	61	10
Asteras Tripolis (loan)	2010–11	Super League Greece	9	0	0	0	—		9	0
OFI	2012–13	Super League Greece	25	8	2	1	—		27	9
OFI	2013–14	Super League Greece	30	7	8	4	—		38	11
OFI	Total		55	15	10	5	0	0	65	20
Atromitos	2014–15	Super League Greece	28	4	1	0	0	0	29	4
Kortrijk	2015–16	Belgian Pro League	36	9	3	0	—		39	9
Kortrijk	2016–17	Belgian First Division A	10	0	2	0	—		12	0
Kortrijk	2017–18	Belgian First Division A	14	1	0	0	—		14	1
Kortrijk	Total		60	10	5	0	0	0	65	10
Roda (loan)	2016–17	Eredivisie	11	1	0	0	—		11	1
Aalesunds (loan)	2017	Eliteserien	12	3	1	0	—		13	3
Hapoel Haifa	2018–19	Israeli Premier League	7	0	2 (Note: Appearances in the Israeli Super Cup and Toto Cup Ligat Al)	0	4	1	13	1
Dinamo București	2018–19	Liga I	14	4	0	0	—		14	4
Voluntari	2019–20	Liga I	11	1	1	0	—		12	1
AEL	2019–20	Super League Greece	13	0	0	0	—		13	0
Xanthi	2020-21	Super League Greece 2	18	2	0	0	—		18	2
Career total			300	48	25	7	12	3	336	58

== Honours ==
=== Club ===
Aris

- Greek Football Cup: Runner-up 2007–08

Hapoel Haifa

- Israel Super Cup: 2018

=== International ===
Greece U19

- Under-19 European Championship: Runner-up 2007

== Personal life ==
Papazoglou has been dating Vasiliki Tsirogianni, the winner of Star Hellas 2012, since 2011.
