= Guy Hadida =

Israeli footballer

Guy Hadida גיא חדידה
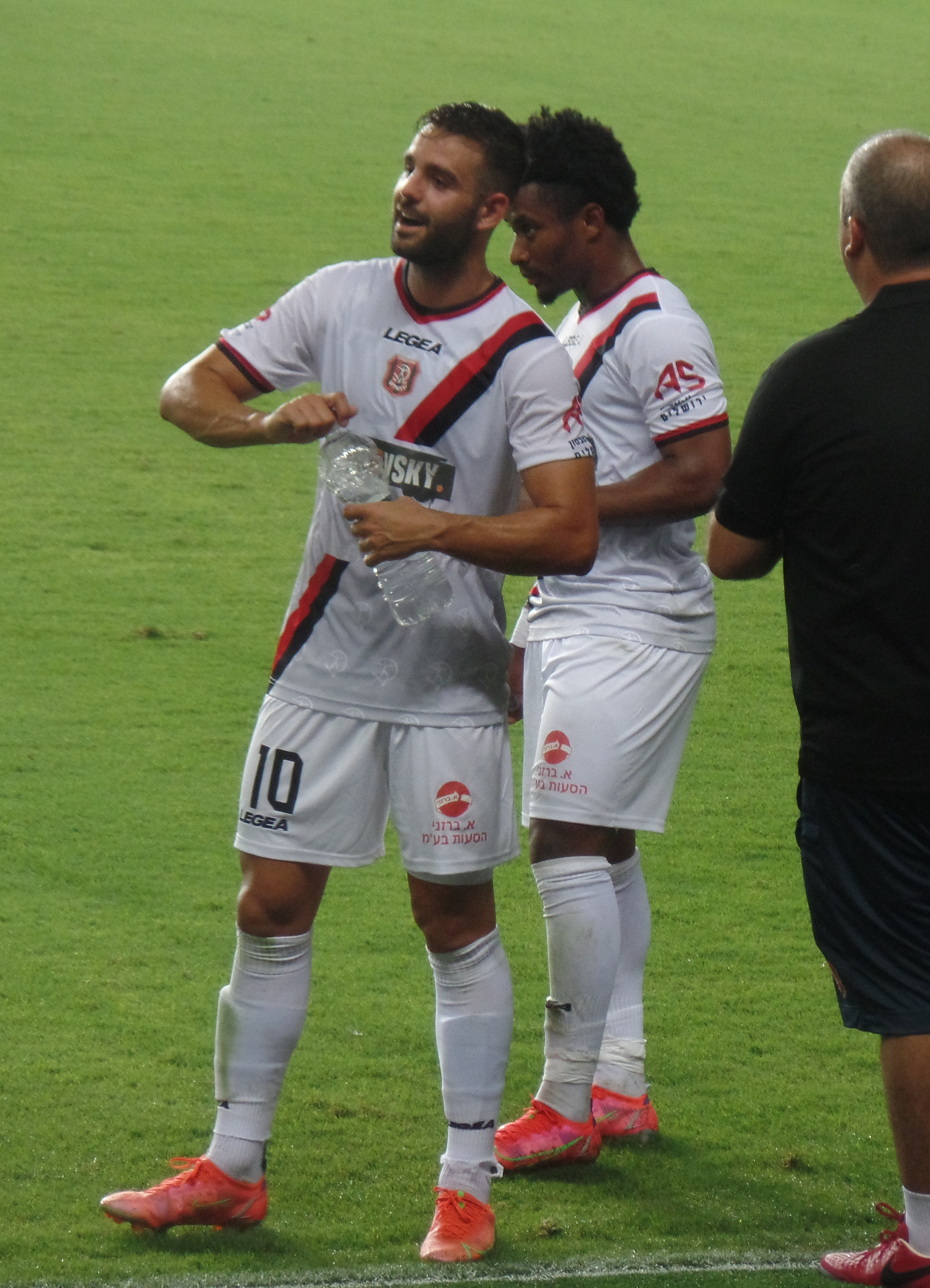

Personal information
- Date of birth: 23 July 1995 (age 31)
- Place of birth: Hod HaSharon, Israel
- Height: 1.78 m (5 ft 10 in)
- Position: Attacking midfielder

Team information
- Current team: Maccabi Bnei Reineh
- Number: 23

Youth career
- Hapoel Tel Aviv

Senior career*
Years	Team	Apps	(Gls)
2014–2015	Hapoel Tel Aviv	2	(0)
2015–2016	Hapoel Ramat HaSharon	9	(1)
2016	Maccabi Yavne	17	(2)
2016–2018	Hapoel Kfar Saba	18	(0)
2018	Beitar Tel Aviv Ramla	17	(3)
2018–2019	Hapoel Haifa	29	(2)
2019–2021	Maccabi Petah Tikva	43	(9)
2021–2022	Hapoel Jerusalem	23	(4)
2022–2023	Maccabi Bnei Reineh	15	(1)
2023	Sakaryaspor	0	(0)
2023–2024	Chornomorets Odesa	23	(3)
2024	Zalaegerszeg	4	(0)
2024–2025	Maccabi Bnei Reineh	31	(8)
2025–	Ironi Tiberias	27	(12)
- * Club domestic league appearances and goals as of 24 June 2026

Guy Hadida (Hebrew: גיא חדידה; born 23 July 1995) is an Israeli professional footballer who plays for Israeli club Ironi Tiberias.

== Club career ==
On 5 February 2024, Hadida signed with Zalaegerszeg in Hungary.
