= Niv Zrihan =

Israeli footballer

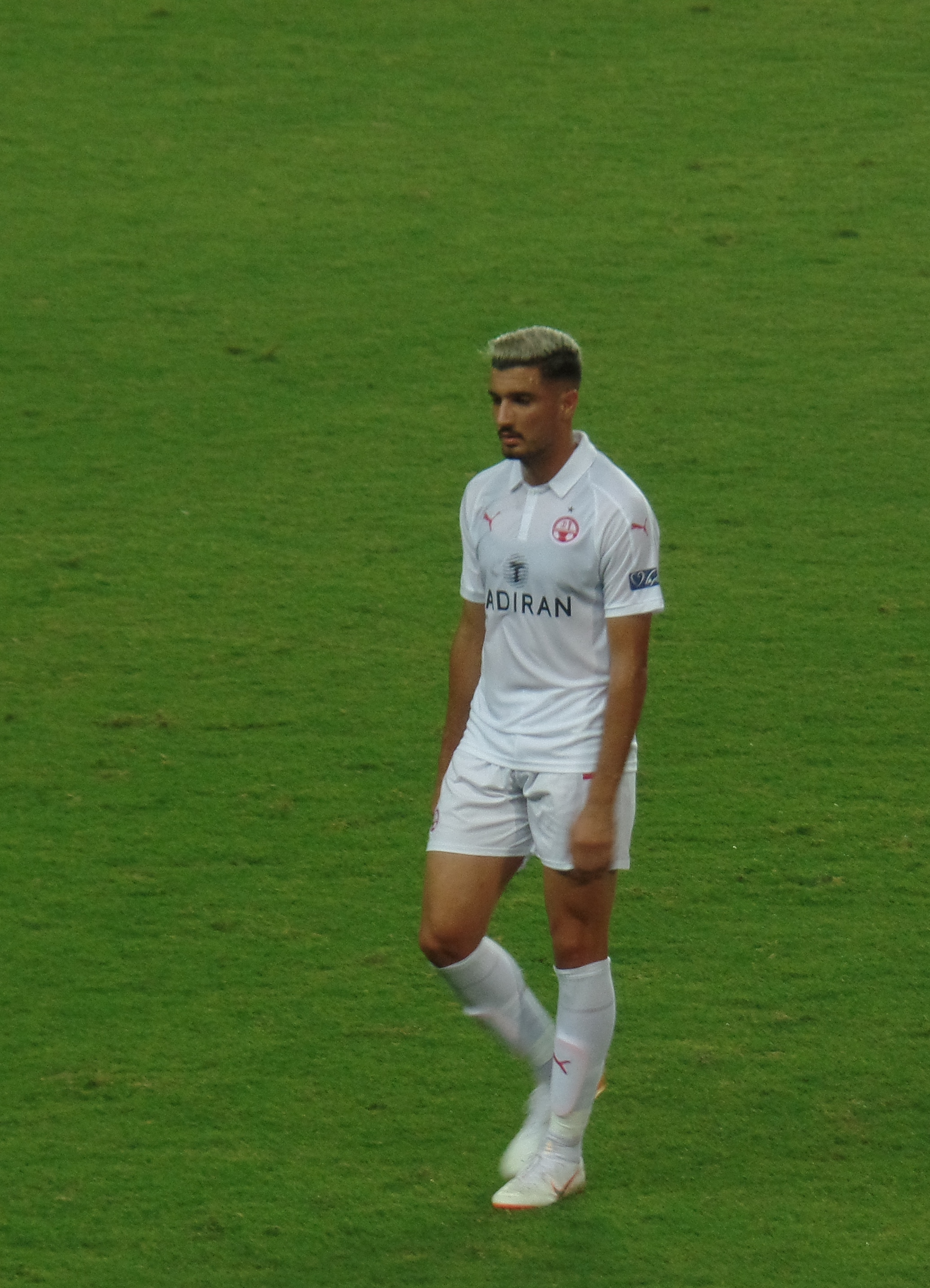
- Niv Zrihan in 2018.

Personal information
- Full name: Niv Zrihan
- Date of birth: May 24, 1994 (age 32)
- Place of birth: Ashdod, Israel
- Height: 1.80 m (5 ft 11 in)
- Position: Forward

Youth career
- F.C. Ashdod

Senior career*
Years	Team	Apps	(Gls)
2011–2017	F.C. Ashdod	87	(11)
2017–2020	Hapoel Be'er Sheva	75	(10)
2020–2021	Bnei Yehuda	15	(2)
2021–2022	Beitar Jerusalem	18	(2)
2022–2023	Hapoel Tel Aviv	17	(2)
2023–2025	Maccabi Jaffa	46	(8)

International career
2013–2017	Israel U21	2	(0)
- * Club domestic league appearances and goals

Niv Zrihan (Hebrew: ניב זריהן; born May 24, 1994) is an Israeli former footballer who played as a Forward.
