= Hen Dilmoni =

Israeli footballer

Personal information
- Full name: Hen Dilmoni
- Date of birth: May 7, 1989 (age 37)
- Place of birth: Ramat Gan, Israel
- Height: 1.86 m (6 ft 1 in)
- Position: Left back

Team information
- Current team: Maccabi Herzliya

Youth career
- Hapoel Ramat Gan

Senior career*
Years	Team	Apps	(Gls)
2008–2011	Hapoel Ramat Gan	3	(0)
2010–2011	→ Hakoah Amidar Ramat Gan	0	(0)
2011–2013	Beitar Tel Aviv Ramla	39	(0)
2013–2016	Ironi Kiryat Shmona	46	(0)
2016	→ Hapoel Kfar Saba	8	(0)
2016–2017	Hapoel Kfar Saba	14	(0)
2017–2018	Beitar Jerusalem	15	(0)
2018–2019	Hapoel Haifa	4	(0)
2019–2020	Hapoel Afula	4	(0)
2020	Maccabi Herzliya	4	(0)
- * Club domestic league appearances and goals as of 1 January 2020

Hen Dilmoni (Hebrew: חן דילמוני; born May 7, 1989), is an Israeli footballer who plays as a left-sided defender for Israeli National League club Maccabi Herzliya.
