= 2017–18 Hapoel Haifa F.C. season =

Hapoel Haifa
2017-18 season
- Owner: Yoav Katz
- Chairman: Yoav Katz
- Manager: Nir Klinger
- Stadium: Sammy Ofer Stadium
- Ligat Ha'Al: 4th
- State Cup: Winners
- Toto Cup: Group stage
- Top goalscorer: League: Alon Turgeman (12); Eden Ben Basat (12); All: Alon Turgeman (17)
- Biggest win: 4 - 0 (vs Hapoel Acre, 14 October 2017)
- Biggest defeat: 0 - 4 (vs Maccabi Tel Aviv, 24 February 2018)
colours	colours	colours

Hapoel Haifa Football Club is an Israeli football club located in Haifa. During the 2017-18 campaign they will be competing in the following competitions:Israeli Premier League, State Cup, Toto Cup Ligat Al.

== Club ==
=== Kits ===
- Provider: Diadora
- Main Sponsor: First Index
- Secondary Sponsor: Moked Hat'ama

Home	Away	3rd	GK 1	GK 2

== First team ==
No.	Pos.	Nation	Player
1	GK	ISR	Ran Kadoch
2	DF	SWE	Rasmus Sjöstedt
3	DF	ISR	Haim Megrelashvili
4	DF	ISR	Dor Malul
6	MF	ISR	Gal Arel
7	MF	ISR	Maxim Plakuschenko
9	FW	ISR	Eden Ben Basat (Captain)
10	FW	ISR	Idan Golan
12	FW	ISR	Aner Shechter
13	GK	LTU	Ernestas Šetkus
14	FW	MDA	Radu Gînsari
15	MF	ISR	Gil Vermouth

No.	Pos.	Nation	Player
17	FW	ISR	Alon Turgeman
18	DF	ISR	Samuel Scheimann
20	FW	ISR	Sa'ar Fadida
22	FW	CRO	Josip Ivančić
23	GK	ISR	Rotem Fadida
24	DF	ISR	Liran Serdal
30	DF	ROU	Gabriel Tamaș
51	DF	MKD	Risto Mitrevski
55	DF	ISR	Nisso Kapiloto
77	MF	ISR	Roslan Barsky
99	FW	ISR	Mamoon Qashoua

== Transfers ==
=== Summer ===
In:

No.	Pos.	Nation	Player
—	GK	ISR	Ran Kadoch (from Hapoel Kfar Saba)
—	MF	ROU	Gabriel Tamaș (from (Romania) Steaua București)
—	MF	ISR	Roslan Barsky (on loan from Maccabi Tel Aviv)
—	DF	SWE	Rasmus Sjöstedt (from (Cyprus) Aris Limassol)
—	FW	MDA	Radu Gînsari (from (Moldova) Sheriff Tiraspol)
—	GK	LTU	Ernestas Šetkus (from (Netherlands) ADO Den Haag)
—	FW	ISR	Alon Turgeman (from Maccabi Haifa)
—	FW	ISR	Mamoon Qashoua (from Hapoel Petah Tikva)

Out:

No.	Pos.	Nation	Player
—	MF	ISR	Dor Peretz (loan return to Maccabi Tel Aviv)
—	FW	ISR	Shlomi Arbeitman (to Maccabi Petah Tikva)
—	FW	ISR	Mahran Lala (suspended)
—	GK	NED	Piet Velthuizen ( (Cyprus) AC Omonia)
—	FW	MNE	Žarko Korać (to (Montenegro) OFK Grbalj)
—	FW	BRA	Adilson Bahia (on loan to F.C. Ashdod)
—	MF	BRA	Júlio César (to Hapoel Katamon Jerusalem)
—	DF	POR	Bruno Pinheiro (to (India) FC Goa)
—	MF	ISR	Yossi Dora (retired)
—	DF	ISR	Oshri Roash (left the team)
—	MF	ISR	Ido Vaier (on loan to Ironi Nesher)
—	DF	ISR	Ohad Elbilia (left the team)

=== Winter ===
In:

No.	Pos.	Nation	Player
—	DF	MKD	Risto Mitrevski (from (Croatia) Istra 1961)
—	MF	ISR	Gil Vermouth (from Maccabi Haifa)
—	FW	CRO	Josip Ivančić (from Hapoel Ashkelon)

Out:

No.	Pos.	Nation	Player
—	DF	ISR	Ofek Fishler (on loan to Beitar Tel Aviv Ramla)
—	MF	ISR	Hisham Kiwan (on loan to Maccabi Ahi Nazareth)
—	MF	ISR	Hanan Maman (to Hapoel Be'er Sheva)

== Preseason and friendlies ==
Win Draw Loss

10 July 2017	Hapoel Haifa	2 - 1	Hapoel Acre	Haifa
17:45	Golan 18'; Qashoua 41'	Report	Sam 11'	Stadium: Kiryat Haim

13 July 2017	Hapoel Haifa	0 - 0	Hapoel Afula	Haifa
17:45		Report		Stadium: Kiryat Haim

17 July 2017 Training Camp	Hapoel Haifa (Israel)	3 - 0	(Ukraine) Shakhtar Donetsk U-21	Kyiv
19:00	Qashoua 2'; Plakuschenko 17', 57'	Report

20 July 2017 Training Camp	Hapoel Haifa (Israel)	6 - 2	(Ukraine) Arsenal Kyiv	Kyiv
19:00	Malul 25'; Gînsari 35', 45'; Turgeman 60', 63'; Shechter 70'	Report	2'; 46'

23 July 2017 Training Camp	Hapoel Haifa (Israel)	1 - 1	(Ukraine) Dynamo Kyiv	Kyiv
19:00	Turgeman 60'	Report	85'

28 July 2017	Hapoel Haifa	2 - 0	Ironi Nesher	Haifa
17:45	Kiwan 1'; Ben Basat 75'	Report		Stadium: Kiryat Haim

16 November 2017	Hapoel Hadera	1 - 1	Hapoel Haifa	Hadera
	Yerushalmi 35'	Report	Barsky 80'	Stadium: Hadera

== Competitions ==
=== Overview ===
Competition	First match	Last match	Starting round	Final position	Record							
Competition	First match	Last match	Starting round	Final position	Pld	W	D	L	GF	GA	GD	Win %
Ligat Ha'Al	19 August 2017	21 May 2018	Matchday 1	4th	36	17	11	8	48	39	+9	47.22
State Cup	4 January 2018	9 May 2018	Eighth Round	Winners	6	3	3	0	10	6	+4	50.00
Toto Cup	2 August 2017	13 August 2017	Group Stage	4th Group A	4	1	1	2	3	6	−3	25.00
Total					46	21	15	10	61	51	+10	45.65

Last updated: 1 September 2018.
Source: Competitions

== Ligat Ha'Al ==
=== Results summary ===
Overall								Home						Away					
Pld	W	D	L	GF	GA	GD	Pts	W	D	L	GF	GA	GD	W	D	L	GF	GA	GD
36	17	11	8	48	39	+9	62	10	4	4	27	18	+9	7	7	4	21	21	0

Last updated: 26 November 2017.

==== Results by matchday ====
Matchday	1	2	3	4	5	6	7	8	9	10	11	12	13	14	15	16	17	18	19	20	21	22	23	24	25	26	27	28	29	30	31	32	33	34	35	36
Ground	H	A	H	A	H	A	H	A	H	A	H	H	A	A	H	A	H	A	H	A	H	A	H	A	A	H	A	A	H	A	H	H	H	A	H	A
Result	W	W	W	D	D	W	W	W	W	L	D	W	D	D	W	W	L	D	L	W	W	D	W	L	W	W	W	L	D	D	L	D	W	L	L	D
Position	2	2	2	2	2	1	1	1	1	1	1	1	2	2	2	2	3	4	4	4	4	4	4	4	4	4	4	4	3	3	4	4	4	4	4	4

Updated to match(es) played on 26 November 2017. Source:
A = Away; H = Home; W = Win; D = Draw; L = Loss

=== Regular season ===
Win Draw Loss

19 August 2017 Match 1	Hapoel Haifa	3 - 1	Hapoel Ashkelon	Haifa
19:15	Serdal (yellow card) 42'; Ben Basat 60'; Turgeman 64', 81'; Plakuschenko (yellow card) 85'	Report	Ayela 7'; Lugasi (yellow card) 28'; Jovanović (yellow card) 58'; Gabai (yellow card) 63'; Malka (yellow card) 71'	Stadium: Sammy Ofer; Attendance: 2,500; Referee: (Israel) Daniel Bar Natan

26 August 2017 Match 2	Maccabi Petah Tikva	0 - 2	Hapoel Haifa	Petah Tikva
20:30	Danino (yellow card) 21'; Magbo (yellow card) 40'	Report	Turgeman 28'; Plakuschenko 78'	Stadium: HaMoshava; Attendance: 3,000; Referee: (Israel) Eli Hacmon

9 September 2017 Match 3	Hapoel Haifa	2 - 1	Bnei Yehuda Tel Aviv	Haifa
19:15	Barsky 36'; Ben Basat 68'; Šetkus (yellow card) 85'	Report	Finish (yellow card) 26'; Tchibota 44'; Hozez (yellow card) 47'; Gordana (yellow card) 60'; Azuz (yellow card) 47' (red card) 65'	Stadium: Sammy Ofer; Attendance: 3,900; Referee: (Israel) Shalom Ben Avraham

16 September 2017 Match 4	Beitar Jerusalem	3 - 3	Hapoel Haifa	Jerusalem
20:30	Vered 22', 39'; Sabo (yellow card) 57'; Conte (yellow card) 55' (red card) 90+3'; Georginho 66'	Report	Plakuschenko (yellow card) 14'; Ben Basat 17', 27', 90+4'; Barsky (yellow card) 29'; Shechter (yellow card) 90'	Stadium: Teddy; Attendance: 15,000; Referee: (Israel) Ziv Adler

23 September 2017 Match 5	Hapoel Haifa	1 - 1	Hapoel Be'er Sheva	Haifa
20:30	Ben Basat (yellow card) 45'; Maman 60'	Report	Pekhart 4'; Tzedek (yellow card) 65'; Ogu (yellow card) 73'; Sahar (yellow card) 85'	Stadium: Sammy Ofer; Attendance: 7,000; Referee: (Israel) Gal Leivovich

1 October 2017 Match 6	Hapoel Ironi Kiryat Shmona	0 - 1	Hapoel Haifa	Kiryat Shmona
20:00	Abed (yellow card) 47'; Diniz (yellow card) 60'; Taira (yellow card) 83'; Cuéllar (yellow card) 90'	Report	Kapiloto (yellow card) 35'; Tamaş (yellow card) 53'; Maman 67' (yellow card) 78'; Gînsari (yellow card) 70'	Stadium: Kiryat Shmona Municipal; Attendance: 2,000; Referee: (Israel) Roei Rainshraiber

14 October 2017 Match 7	Hapoel Haifa	4 - 0	Hapoel Acre	Haifa
18:30	Turgeman 5', 20', 58' (yellow card) 55'; Sjöstedt (yellow card) 38'; Barsky (yellow card) 42'; Maman 80'	Report	Nassar (yellow card) 36'; Kanichowsky (yellow card) 60'	Stadium: Sammy Ofer; Attendance: 4,600; Referee: (Israel) Igal Farid

22 October 2017 Match 8	Bnei Sakhnin	0 - 1	Hapoel Haifa	Acre
20:15	Wanderson (yellow card) 29'; Gantus (yellow card) 79'	Report	Gînsari (yellow card) 77'; Ben Basat 83'	Stadium: Acre Municipal; Attendance: 3,900; Referee: (Israel) Alon Yefet

28 October 2017 Match 9	Hapoel Haifa	2 - 0	Hapoel Ra'anana	Haifa
18:00	Barsky 4'; Tamaș (yellow card) 26'; Plakuschenko 35'; Gînsari (yellow card) 45'; Kapiloto (yellow card) 62'	Report	Ali Camara (yellow card) 12'; Shuker (yellow card) 65'; Shuker (yellow card) 90+3'	Stadium: Sammy Ofer; Attendance: 5,300; Referee: (Israel) Gal Leivovich

4 November 2017 Match 10	Maccabi Netanya	2 - 0	Hapoel Haifa	Netanya
18:15	Levy (yellow card) 28' (goal) 39' (pen.); Avraham 60'; Badash (yellow card) 79'	Report	Turgeman (yellow card) 18'; Barsky (yellow card) 24'; Tamaș (yellow card) 28'; Malul (yellow card) 38'; Ben Basat (yellow card) 71' (yellow-red card) 75'	Stadium: Netanya; Attendance: 11,500; Referee: (Israel) Roei Rainshraiber

26 November 2017 Match 11	Hapoel Haifa	2 - 2	Maccabi Tel Aviv	Haifa
20:15	Turgeman 33'; Kapiloto (yellow card) 45' (yellow-red card) 86'; Maman (yellow card) 49' (goal) 55' (pen.)	Report	Babin (yellow card) 12'; Rikan 35'; Atar 45+2'	Stadium: Sammy Ofer; Attendance: 7,500; Referee: (Israel) Orel Grinfeld

4 December 2017 Match 12	Hapoel Haifa	1 - 0	Maccabi Haifa	Haifa
21:00	Gînsari 12' (yellow card) 44'; Arel (yellow card) 53'; Serdal (yellow card) 88'	Report	Mabouka (yellow card) 60'	Stadium: Sammy Ofer; Attendance: 23,475; Referee: (Israel) Menashe Mashiah

9 December 2017 Match 13	F.C. Ashdod	1 - 1	Hapoel Haifa	Ashdod
16:00	Asefa (yellow card) 10'; Bahia (yellow card) 35' (yellow-red card) 83'; Eleke 58'	Report	Kapiloto (yellow card) 21'; Turgeman 42'; Gînsari (yellow card) 83'	Stadium: Yud-Alef; Attendance: 1,900; Referee: (Israel) Shalom Ben Avraham

16 December 2017 Match 14	Hapoel Ashkelon	0 - 0	Hapoel Haifa	Ashkelon
18:15	Lugasi (yellow card) 45'; Oremuš (yellow card) 45'	Report	Malul (yellow card) 45'; Sjöstedt (yellow card) 47'	Stadium: Sala; Attendance: 2,200; Referee: (Israel) Ziv Adler

23 December 2017 Match 15	Hapoel Haifa	2 - 0	Maccabi Petah Tikva	Haifa
18:15	Ben Basat 34'; Arel 81'; Serdal (yellow card) 87'	Report	Arbeitman (yellow card) 45'; Soumah (yellow card) 80'	Stadium: Sammy Ofer; Attendance: 4,900; Referee: (Israel) Alon Yefet

30 December 2017 Match 16	Bnei Yehuda Tel Aviv	0 - 1	Hapoel Haifa	Petah Tikva
16:00		Report	Sjöstedt (yellow card) 10'; Scheimann (yellow card) 16'; Plakuschenko (yellow card) 82'; Gînsari 85'	Stadium: HaMoshava; Attendance: 4,400; Referee: (Israel) Orel Grinfeld

8 January 2018 Match 17	Hapoel Haifa	0 - 2	Beitar Jerusalem	Haifa
20:30	Malul (yellow card) 8'; Tamaş (yellow card) 37'	Report	Varenne 33'; Conte (yellow card) 38'; Ezra 59'	Stadium: Sammy Ofer; Attendance: 12,000; Referee: (Israel) Eli Hachmon

14 January 2018 Match 18	Hapoel Be'er Sheva	1 - 1	Hapoel Haifa	Be'er Sheva
20:30	Nwakaeme (yellow card) 4'; Sahar 49'; Melikson (yellow card) 79'	Report	Ben Basat 1'; Barsky (yellow card) 4'; Sjöstedt (yellow card) 84'	Stadium: Turner; Attendance: 15,097; Referee: (Israel) Alon Yefet

20 January 2018 Match 19	Hapoel Haifa	0 - 2	Hapoel Ironi Kiryat Shmona	Haifa
16:00	Scheimann (yellow card) 32'; Sjöstedt (yellow card) 54'; Gînsari (yellow card) 68'; Tamaş (red card) 90'	Report	Shamir (yellow card) 11'; Abed 55'; Menahem 90'	Stadium: Sammy Ofer; Attendance: 4,700; Referee: (Israel) Ziv Adler

27 January 2018 Match 20	Hapoel Acre	0 - 1	Hapoel Haifa	Acre
16:00	Baltaxa (yellow card) 55'; Sissoko (yellow card) 89'; Ibeh (yellow card) 90+1'	Report	Malul (yellow card) 8'; Gînsari (yellow card) 32'; Plakuschenko (yellow card) 58'; Turgeman (yellow card) 73'; Barsky (yellow card) 76'; Golan 82'	Stadium: Acre Municipal; Attendance: 1,000; Referee: (Israel) Guy Berger

3 February 2018 Match 21	Hapoel Haifa	1 - 0	Bnei Sakhnin	Haifa
16:00	Tamaş (yellow card) 65'; Mitrevski (yellow card) 67'; Arel 80'; Gînsari (yellow card) 87'	Report	Avidor (yellow card) 62'; Abu Saleh (yellow card) 78'	Stadium: Sammy Ofer; Attendance: 4,700; Referee: (Israel) David Fuxman

10 February 2018 Match 22	Hapoel Ra'anana	1 - 1	Hapoel Haifa	Netanya
16:00	Zikri 8' (yellow card) 41'; Abuhatzira (yellow card) 18'; Dasa (yellow card) 32' (yellow-red card) 37'; Arshid (yellow card) 48'; Ali Camara (yellow card) 53'	Report	Plakuschenko 47'; Mitrevski (yellow card) 71'; Gînsari (yellow card) 71'	Stadium: Netanya; Attendance: 1,600; Referee: (Israel) Eli Hacmon

18 February 2018 Match 23	Hapoel Haifa	2 - 0	Maccabi Netanya	Haifa
20:30	Megrelashvili (yellow card) 15'; Vermouth 29'; Ben Basat (yellow card) 44'; Arel (yellow card) 46'; Turgeman 54'; Mitrevski (yellow card) 64'	Report	Vrgoč (yellow card) 24'; Levy (yellow card) 38'; Safouri (yellow card) 62'; Mohamed (yellow card) 65'; Badash (yellow card) 88'	Stadium: Sammy Ofer; Attendance: 5,430; Referee: (Israel) Igal Farid

24 February 2018 Match 24	Maccabi Tel Aviv	4 - 0	Hapoel Haifa	Netanya
20:30	Blackman 13'; Rodríguez 33', 61'; Rikan (yellow card) 66'; Davidzada 83'	Report	Arel (yellow card) 57'; Ben Basat (yellow card) 75'	Stadium: Netanya; Attendance: 11,538; Referee: (Israel) Alon Yefet

5 March 2018 Match 25	Maccabi Haifa	0 - 3	Hapoel Haifa	Haifa
21:00	Mizrahi (yellow card) 59'; Azulay (yellow card) 85'; Awaed (yellow card) 90'	Report	Ivančić (yellow card) 35'; Mabouka 44' (o.g.); Tamaș 55'; Kapiloto (yellow card) 59'; Turgeman 65'	Stadium: Sammy Ofer; Attendance: 10,132; Referee: (Israel) Ziv Adler

10 March 2018 Match 26	Hapoel Haifa	1 - 0	F.C. Ashdod	Haifa
18:15	Jakobovich 90+3' (o.g.)	Report		Stadium: Sammy Ofer; Attendance: 4,200; Referee: (Israel) Erez Papir

==== Regular season table ====
Pos	Team	Pld	W	D	L	GF	GA	GD	Pts	Qualification or relegation
2	Beitar Jerusalem	26	17	5	4	60	30	+30	56	Qualification for the Championship round
3	Maccabi Tel Aviv	26	16	7	3	44	20	+24	55	Qualification for the Championship round
4	Hapoel Haifa	26	15	7	4	36	21	+15	52	Qualification for the Championship round
5	Maccabi Netanya	26	12	9	5	43	29	+14	45	Qualification for the Championship round
6	Bnei Yehuda	26	11	7	8	32	26	+6	40	Qualification for the Championship round

Source: Israel Football Association, Soccerway
Rules for classification: 1) Points; 2) Goal difference; 3) Matches won; 4) Goals scored; 5) Head-to-head points; 6) Head-to-head goal difference; 7) Head-to-head goals scored; 8) Play-off.

==== Results overview ====
Win Draw Loss

Opposition	Home score	Away score
Beitar Jerusalem	0 - 2	3 - 3
Bnei Sakhnin	1 - 0	1 - 0
Bnei Yehuda Tel Aviv	2 - 1	1 - 0
F.C. Ashdod	1 - 0	1 - 1
Hapoel Akko	4 - 0	1 - 0
Hapoel Ashkelon	3 - 1	0 - 0
Hapoel Be'er Sheva	1 - 1	1 - 1
Hapoel Ra'anana	2 - 0	1 - 1
Hapoel Ironi Kiryat Shmona	0 - 2	1 - 0
Maccabi Haifa	1 - 0	3 - 0
Maccabi Netanya	2 - 0	0 - 2
Maccabi Petah Tikva	2 - 0	2 - 0
Maccabi Tel Aviv	2 - 2	0 - 4

=== Play-off ===
18 March 2018 Match 27	Maccabi Tel Aviv	1 - 2	Hapoel Haifa	Netanya
21:00	Dasa 15'; Golasa (yellow card) 18'; Blackman (yellow card) 45'; Spugnin (yellow card) 52'	Report	Mitrevski (yellow card) 19'; Barsky (yellow card) 49'; Plakuschenko 67' (yellow card) 90'; Megrelashvili 90+2'	Stadium: Netanya; Attendance: 11,324; Referee: (Israel) Eli Hacmon

4 April 2018 Match 28	Bnei Yehuda Tel Aviv	3 - 0	Hapoel Haifa	Petah Tikva
19:00	Tchibota 5'; Gordana 12', 42' (pen.); Azuz (yellow card) 39'; Turgeman (yellow card) 80'; Mori (yellow card) 90'	Report	Tamaș (yellow card) 12' (yellow-red card) 68'; Kapiloto (yellow card) 37'; Arel (yellow card) 63'; Sjöstedt (yellow card) 75'	Stadium: HaMoshava; Attendance: 2,200; Referee: (Israel) Liran Liani

8 April 2018 Match 29	Hapoel Haifa	1 - 1	Maccabi Netanya	Haifa
20:00	Scheimann (yellow card) 9' (yellow-red card) 89'; Kapiloto 40'	Report	Kougbenya 47'; Goldenberg (yellow card) 86'	Stadium: Sammy Ofer; Attendance: 4,100; Referee: (Israel) Gal Leivovich

15 April 2018 Match 30	Hapoel Be'er Sheva	2 - 2	Hapoel Haifa	Be'er Sheva
20:30	Elhamed (yellow card) 49'; Ogu 79'; Haimov (yellow card) 90+1'; Ben Basat 90+4' (o.g.)	Report	Turgeman 29'; Vermouth (yellow card) 32'; Sjöstedt (yellow card) 44'; Ben Basat 50' (pen.); Tamaș (yellow card) 67'; Megrelashvili (yellow card) 76'	Stadium: Turner; Attendance: 15,900; Referee: (Israel) Alon Yefet

23 April 2018 Match 31	Hapoel Haifa	0 - 1	Beitar Jerusalem	Haifa
20:55	Kapiloto (yellow card) 47'; Scheimann (yellow card) 54'; Ivančić (yellow card) 90'	Report	Ezra 23'; Keltjens (yellow card) 75'	Stadium: Sammy Ofer; Attendance: 7,700; Referee: (Israel) Alon Yefet

30 April 2018 Match 32	Hapoel Haifa	2 - 2	Maccabi Tel Aviv	Haifa
21:00	Tamaș (yellow card) 46'; Ben Basat 88', 90+3'	Report	Schoenfeld (yellow card) 31' (red card) 89'; Atzili 47'; Rikan (yellow card) 76'; Blackman 81'	Stadium: Sammy Ofer; Attendance: 4,000; Referee: (Israel) Eli Hachmon

5 May 2018 Match 33	Hapoel Haifa	2 - 1	Bnei Yehuda Tel Aviv	Haifa
18:15	Arel 57' (yellow card) 81'; Ben Basat 75'	Report	Kandil (yellow card) 43'; Turgeman (yellow card) 45'; Ismaila Soro (yellow card) 62'; Cohen 87' (pen.); Gordana (yellow card) 90'	Stadium: Sammy Ofer; Attendance: 4,000; Referee: (Israel) Shalom Ben Avraham

12 May 2018 Match 34	Maccabi Netanya	2 - 1	Hapoel Haifa	Netanya
18:00	Levy (yellow card) 11' (goal) 63'; Kougbenya (yellow card) 20'; Tiram (yellow card) 27'; Saba 90'	Report	Arel 1'; Mitrevski (yellow card) 90'; Barsky (yellow card) 90+3'	Stadium: Netanya; Attendance: 4,980; Referee: (Israel) Daniel Bar Natan

15 May 2018 Match 35	Hapoel Haifa	1 - 4	Hapoel Be'er Sheva	Haifa
20:15	Turgeman 10'; Plakuschenko (yellow card) 54'	Report	Pekhart 42'; Taha (yellow card) 49'; Melamed 58'; Elo (yellow card) 73'; Radi 77'; Einbinder 90+1'	Stadium: Sammy Ofer; Attendance: 2,900; Referee: (Israel) Igal Farid

21 May 2018 Match 36	Beitar Jerusalem	1 - 1	Hapoel Haifa	Jerusalem
21:00	Keltjens (yellow card) 34'; Kriaf 59'	Report	Ginsari 63'; Shechter (yellow card) 77'	Stadium: Teddy; Attendance: 1,500; Referee: (Israel) Gal Laibovich

==== Championship round table ====
Pos	Team	Pld	W	D	L	GF	GA	GD	Pts	Qualification
1	Hapoel Be'er Sheva (C)	36	24	8	4	70	27	+43	80	Qualification for the Champions League first qualifying round
2	Maccabi Tel Aviv	36	21	8	7	60	33	+27	71	Qualification for the Europa League first qualifying round
3	Beitar Jerusalem	36	20	8	8	75	51	+24	68	Qualification for the Europa League first qualifying round
4	Hapoel Haifa	36	17	11	8	48	39	+9	62	Qualification for the Europa League second qualifying round (Note: Hapoel Haifa qualified for the Europa League second qualifying round by winning the 2017–18 Israel State Cup.)
5	Maccabi Netanya	36	16	10	10	59	54	+5	58	
6	Bnei Yehuda Tel Aviv	36	13	10	13	47	41	+6	49	

Source: Israel Football Association, Soccerway
Rules for classification: 1) Points; 2) Goal difference; 3) Matches won; 4) Goals scored; 5) Head-to-head points; 6) Head-to-head goal difference; 7) Head-to-head goals scored; 8) Play-off.
(C) Champions

==== Results overview ====
Win Draw Loss

Opposition	Home score	Away score
Beitar Jerusalem	0 - 1	1 - 1
Bnei Yehuda Tel Aviv	2 - 1	0 - 3
Hapoel Be'er Sheva	1 - 4	2 - 2
Maccabi Netanya	1 - 1	1 - 2
Maccabi Tel Aviv	2 - 2	2 - 1

== State Cup ==
=== Round of 32 ===
4 January 2018 Round of 32	Hapoel Petah Tikva	1 - 2	Hapoel Haifa	Petah Tikva
19:05	Zamir 31'; Vered (yellow card) 65'	Report	Ginsari 13'; Maman 51'; Sjöstedt (yellow card) 74'	Stadium: Hamoshava Stadium; Attendance: 1,500; Referee: Roei Rainshraiber

=== Round of 16 ===
23 January 2018 round of 16	Hapoel Acre	1 - 2	Hapoel Haifa	Acre
19:05	Azubel 18'; Farhat (yellow card) 18'; Baltaksa (yellow card) 72'	Report	Turgeman 17'; Barski (yellow card) 62'; Turgeman 90'	Stadium: Acre Municipal Stadium; Attendance: 1,000; Referee: Idan Leiba

=== Quarter final ===
6 February 2018 First leg	Maccabi Haifa	2 - 2	Hapoel Haifa	Haifa
21:00	Rukavytsya 11'; Sallalich 15'; Mabouka (yellow card) 37'; Mizrahi (yellow card) 73'; Allyson (yellow card) 75'	Report	Turgeman 57'; Arel (yellow card) 71'; Tamaș 76'; Mitrevski (yellow card) 90+2'	Stadium: Sammy Ofer Stadium; Attendance: 19,216; Referee: Eitan Shmulevich

1 March 2018 Second leg	Hapoel Haifa	1 - 1 (3 – 3a agg.)	Maccabi Haifa	Haifa
20:50	Turgeman (yellow card) 13', (goal) 45'; Tamaș (yellow card) 55'; Ivančić (yellow card) 69'; Šetkus (yellow card) 78'; Malul (yellow card) 8'	Report	Azulay 21', (yellow card) 69'; Sallalich (yellow card) 34'; Kostadinov (yellow card) 58'	Stadium: Sammy Ofer Stadium; Attendance: 17,500; Referee: Liran Liany

=== Semi-final ===
1 April 2018 Semi-finals	Hapoel Haifa	0 - 0 (4 – 3 p)	Hapoel Ra'anana	Haifa
18:00	Mitrevski (yellow card) 18'	Report	Binyamin (yellow card) 81'; Arshid (yellow card) 84'; Ali Camara (red card) 120'	Stadium: Sammy Ofer Stadium; Attendance: 27,000; Referee: Daniel Bar Natan
	Penalties
	Ben Basat (penalty scored); Turgeman (penalty missed); Plakuschenko (penalty scored); Mitrevski (penalty missed); Tamaș (penalty scored); Malul (penalty scored)		Swisa (penalty missed); Nimni (penalty scored); Ali Camara (penalty scored); Arshid (penalty scored); Abuhatzira (penalty missed); Dasa (penalty missed)

=== Final ===
9 May 2018 Final	Hapoel Haifa	3 - 1	Beitar Jerusalem	Jerusalem
20:45	Plakuschenko 28'; Scheimann 105'; Turgeman 120'	Report	Varenne 29'; Conte (yellow card) 91'	Stadium: Teddy Stadium; Attendance: 31,000; Referee: Liran Liany

== Toto Cup Ligat Al ==
Pos	Team	Pld	W	D	L	GF	GA	GD	Pts	Qualification or relegation
1	Maccabi Haifa	4	2	2	0	10	4	+6	8	Qualified to Quarter-finals
2	Hapoel Acre	4	2	1	1	5	7	−2	7	Qualified to Quarter-finals
3	Hapoel Kiryat Shmona	4	1	2	1	5	2	+3	5	Qualified to Quarter-finals
4	Hapoel Haifa	4	1	1	2	3	6	−3	4	
5	Bnei Sakhnin	4	0	2	2	4	8	−4	2	

Updated to match(es) played on 13 August 2017. Source: Israel Football Association
Rules for classification: 1) points; 2) goal difference; 3) number of wins; 4) goals scored; 5) head to head; 6)deciding match.

2 August 2017 Group A Match 2	Hapoel Haifa	0 - 1	Hapoel Acre	Haifa
19:45	Kapiloto (yellow card) 36'	Report	Shish (yellow card) 46'; Mulić (yellow card) 49'; Sam 62'; Índio (yellow card) 90'	Stadium: Sammy Ofer Stadium; Attendance: 1,000; Referee: (Israel) Igal Frid

5 August 2017 Group A Match 3	Bnei Sakhnin	1 - 1	Hapoel Haifa	Acre, Israel
19:00	Kalibat 14'; Sagas (yellow card) 48'	Report	Barsky (yellow card) 7'; Malul (yellow card) 15'; Serdal (yellow card) 27'; Gînsari 33'	Stadium: Acre Municipal Stadium; Attendance: 300; Referee: (Israel) David Fuksmann

8 August 2017 Group A Match 4	Hapoel Haifa	1 - 4	Maccabi Haifa	Haifa
21:00	Sjöstedt (red card) 4'; Kapiloto (yellow card) 65' (goal) 75'	Report	Rukavytsya 5' (pen.) 25'; Allyson (yellow card) 15'; Keinan (yellow card) 20'; Kahat 59' 63'	Stadium: Sammy Ofer Stadium; Attendance: 6,000; Referee: (Israel) Ziv Adler

13 August 2017 Group A Match 5	Ironi Kiryat Shmona	0 - 1	Hapoel Haifa	Acre, Israel
19:45	Abu Abaid (yellow card) 67'	Report	Ben Basat 19' (yellow card) 58'; Fadida (yellow card) 90'	Stadium: Acre Municipal Stadium; Attendance: 250; Referee: (Israel) Idan Leiba

== Statistics ==
=== Appearances and goals ===
No.	Pos	Nat	Player	Total		Ligat Ha'Al		State Cup		Toto Cup	
No.	Pos	Nat	Player	Apps	Goals	Apps	Goals	Apps	Goals	Apps	Goals
1	GK	(Israel) ISR	Ran Kadoch	6	0	4	0	2	0	0	0
2	DF	(Sweden) SWE	Rasmus Sjöstedt	30	0	25	0	2	0	3	0
3	DF	(Israel) ISR	Haim Megrelashvili	14	1	10	1	0	0	4	0
4	DF	(Israel) ISR	Dor Malul	44	0	34	0	6	0	4	0
6	MF	(Israel) ISR	Gal Arel	29	4	23	4	6	0	0	0
7	MF	(Israel) ISR	Maxim Plakuschenko	44	5	35	4	5	1	4	0
9	FW	(Israel) ISR	Eden Ben Basat	36	13	29	12	4	0	3	1
10	FW	(Israel) ISR	Idan Golan	11	1	6	1	2	0	3	0
12	FW	(Israel) ISR	Aner Shechter	3	0	3	0	0	0	0	0
13	GK	(Lithuania) LTU	Ernestas Šetkus	40	0	32	0	4	0	4	0
14	FW	(Moldova) MDA	Radu Gînsari	43	5	33	3	6	1	4	1
15	MF	(Israel) ISR	Gil Vermouth	17	1	13	1	4	0	0	0
17	FW	(Israel) ISR	Alon Turgeman	40	17	34	12	6	5	0	0
18	DF	(Israel) ISR	Samuel Scheimann	43	1	33	0	6	1	4	0
20	FW	(Israel) ISR	Sa'ar Fadida	9	0	6	0	2	0	1	0
22	FW	(Croatia) CRO	Josip Ivančić	19	0	15	0	4	0	0	0
23	GK	(Israel) ISR	Rotem Fadida	0	0	0	0	0	0	0	0
24	DF	(Israel) ISR	Liran Serdal	24	0	18	0	2	0	4	0
30	DF	(Romania) ROU	Gabriel Tamaș	42	2	33	1	5	1	4	0
51	DF	(North Macedonia) MKD	Risto Mitrevski	20	0	15	0	5	0	0	0
55	DF	(Israel) ISR	Nisso Kapiloto	43	2	33	1	6	0	4	1
77	MF	(Israel) ISR	Roslan Barsky	43	2	34	2	5	0	4	0
99	FW	(Israel) ISR	Mamoon Qashoua	18	0	13	0	1	0	4	0
Players away from Hapoel Haifa on loan:
5	DF	(Israel) ISR	Ofek Fishler	4	0	2	0	0	0	2	0
8	MF	(Israel) ISR	Hisham Kiwan	5	0	1	0	0	0	4	0
Players who appeared for Hapoel Haifa that left during the season:
15	MF	(Israel) ISR	Hanan Maman	23	5	18	4	1	1	4	0

=== Goalscorers ===
Rank	No.	Pos	Nat	Name	Ligat Ha'Al	State Cup	Toto Cup	Total
1	17	FW	(Israel)	Alon Turgeman	12	5	0	17
2	9	FW	(Israel)	Eden Ben Basat	12	0	1	13
3	7	MF	(Israel)	Maxim Plakuschenko	4	1	0	5
3	15	MF	(Israel)	Hanan Maman	4	1	0	5
3	14	FW	(Moldova)	Radu Gînsari	3	1	1	5
6	6	DF	(Israel)	Gal Arel	4	0	0	4
7	77	MF	(Israel)	Roslan Barsky	2	0	0	2
7	30	DF	(Romania)	Gabriel Tamaș	1	1	0	2
7	55	DF	(Israel)	Nisso Kapiloto	1	0	1	2
10	3	DF	(Israel)	Haim Megrelashvili	1	0	0	1
10	10	FW	(Israel)	Idan Golan	1	0	0	1
10	15	MF	(Israel)	Gil Vermouth	1	0	0	1
10	18	DF	(Israel)	Samuel Scheimann	0	1	0	1
Own goal					2	0	0	2
Totals					48	10	3	61

Last updated: 21 May 2018

=== Assists ===
Rank	No.	Pos	Nat	Name	Ligat Ha'Al	State Cup	Toto Cup	Total
1	15	MF	(Israel)	Hanan Maman	5	1	1	7
2	4	DF	(Israel)	Dor Malul	5	1	0	6
2	18	DF	(Israel)	Samuel Scheimann	5	1	0	6
4	7	MF	(Israel)	Maxim Plakuschenko	5	0	0	5
4	14	FW	(Moldova)	Radu Gînsari	4	1	0	5
4	77	MF	(Israel)	Roslan Barsky	4	0	1	5
7	15	MF	(Israel)	Gil Vermouth	2	2	0	4
8	17	FW	(Israel)	Alon Turgeman	3	0	0	3
9	22	FW	(Croatia)	Josip Ivančić	1	1	0	2
10	6	DF	(Israel)	Gal Arel	1	0	0	1
10	9	FW	(Israel)	Eden Ben Basat	1	0	0	1
10	99	FW	(Israel)	Mamoon Qashoua	0	1	0	1
10	30	DF	(Romania)	Gabriel Tamaș	0	0	1	1
Totals					36	8	3	47

Last updated: 21 May 2018

=== Clean sheets ===
Updated on 21 May 2018

Rank	Pos.	No.	Name	Ligat Ha'Al	State Cup	Toto Cup	Total
1	GK	13	(Lithuania) Ernestas Šetkus	13	1	1	15
2	GK	1	(Israel) Ran Kadoch	1	0	0	1
Totals				14	1	1	16

=== Disciplinary record ===
Updated on 21 May 2018

No.	Pos	Nat	Name	Ligat Ha'Al			State Cup			Toto Cup			Total		
No.	Pos	Nat	Name	Yellow card	(yellow card) (yellow-red card)	Red card	Yellow card	(yellow card) (yellow-red card)	Red card	Yellow card	(yellow card) (yellow-red card)	Red card	Yellow card	(yellow card) (yellow-red card)	Red card
30	DF	(Romania)	Gabriel Tamaș	7	1	1	1						8	1	1
55	DF	(Israel)	Nisso Kapiloto	6	1					2			8	1	
2	DF	(Sweden)	Rasmus Sjöstedt	7			1					1	8		1
14	FW	(Moldova)	Radu Gînsari	9									9		
77	MF	(Israel)	Roslan Barsky	7			1						8		
51	DF	(North Macedonia)	Risto Mitrevski	5			2						7		
7	MF	(Israel)	Maxim Plakuschenko	6									6		
6	MF	(Israel)	Gal Arel	5			1						6		
4	DF	(Israel)	Dor Malul	4			1			1			6		
9	FW	(Israel)	Eden Ben Basat	3	1					1			4	1	
18	DF	(Israel)	Samuel Scheimann	3	1								3	1	
17	FW	(Israel)	Alon Turgeman	3			1						4		
24	DF	(Israel)	Liran Serdal	3						1			4		
22	FW	(Croatia)	Josip Ivančić	2			1						3		
3	DF	(Israel)	Haim Megrelashvili	2									2		
12	FW	(Israel)	Aner Shechter	2									2		
15	MF	(Israel)	Hanan Maman	2									2		
13	GK	(Lithuania)	Ernestas Šetkus	1			1						2		
15	MF	(Israel)	Gil Vermouth	1									1		
20	FW	(Israel)	Sa'ar Fadida							1			1		

=== Suspensions ===
Updated on 21 May 2018

Player	Date Received	Offence	Length of suspension		
Rasmus Sjöstedt	8 August 2017	(red card) 4' vs Maccabi Haifa	1 Match	Hapoel Ironi Kiryat Shmona (A)	13 August 2017
Eden Ben Basat	4 November 2017	(yellow card) 71' (yellow-red card) 75' vs Maccabi Netanya	1 Match	Maccabi Tel Aviv (H)	26 November 2017
Nisso Kapiloto	26 November 2017	(yellow card) 71' (yellow-red card) 75' vs Maccabi Tel Aviv	1 Match	Maccabi Haifa (H)	4 December 2017
Radu Gînsari	9 December 2017	(yellow card) 83' vs F.C. Ashdod	1 Match	Maccabi Petah Tikva (H)	23 December 2017
Rasmus Sjöstedt	14 January 2017	(yellow card) 84' vs Hapoel Be'er Sheva	1 Match	Hapoel Acre (A)	23 January 2018
Roslan Barsky	23 January 2018	(yellow card) 62' vs Hapoel Acre	1 Match	Bnei Sakhnin (H)	3 February 2018
Gabriel Tamaș	20 January 2018	(red card) 90' vs Hapoel Ironi Kiryat Shmona	1 Match	Hapoel Acre (A)	23 January 2018
Gabriel Tamaș	3 February 2018	(yellow card) 90' vs Bnei Sakhnin	1 Match	Hapoel Ra'anana (A)	10 February 2018
Dor Malul	1 March 2018	(yellow card) 8' vs Maccabi Haifa	1 Match	F.C. Ashdod (H)	10 March 2018
Risto Mitrevski	18 March 2018	(yellow card) 19' vs Maccabi Tel Aviv	1 Match	Bnei Yehuda Tel Aviv (A)	4 April 2018
Maxim Plakuschenko	18 March 2018	(yellow card) 90' vs Maccabi Tel Aviv	1 Match	Bnei Yehuda Tel Aviv (A)	4 April 2018
Gabriel Tamaș	4 April 2018	(yellow card) 12' (yellow-red card) 68' vs Bnei Yehuda Tel Aviv	1 Match	Maccabi Netanya (H)	8 April 2018
Nisso Kapiloto	4 April 2018	(yellow card) 37' vs Bnei Yehuda Tel Aviv	1 Match	Hapoel Be'er Sheva (A)	15 April 2018
Gal Arel	4 April 2018	(yellow card) 63' vs Bnei Yehuda Tel Aviv	1 Match	Hapoel Be'er Sheva (A)	15 April 2018
Samuel Scheimann	8 April 2018	(yellow card) 9' (yellow-red card) 89' vs Maccabi Netanya	1 Match	Hapoel Be'er Sheva (A)	15 April 2018

=== Penalties ===
Updated on 21 May 2018

Date	Penalty Taker	Scored	Opponent	Competition
26.11.2017	Hanan Maman	Yes	Maccabi Tel Aviv	Ligat Ha'Al
15.4.2018	Eden Ben Basat	Yes	Hapoel Be'er Sheva	Ligat Ha'Al

=== Overall ===
	Total	Home	Away	Natural
Games played	46	21	23	2
Games won	21	10	10	1
Games drawn	15	5	9	1
Games lost	10	6	4	-
Biggest win	4 - 0 vs Hapoel Acre	4 - 0 vs Hapoel Acre	3 - 0 vs Maccabi Haifa	3 - 1 vs Beitar Jerusalem
Biggest loss	0 - 4 vs Maccabi Tel Aviv	1 - 4 vs Hapoel Be'er Sheva; 1 - 4 vs Maccabi Haifa	0 - 4 vs Maccabi Tel Aviv	-
Biggest win (League)	4 - 0 vs Hapoel Acre	4 - 0 vs Hapoel Acre	3 - 0 vs Maccabi Haifa	-
Biggest loss (League)	0 - 4 vs Maccabi Tel Aviv	1 - 4 vs Hapoel Be'er Sheva	0 - 4 vs Maccabi Tel Aviv	-
Biggest win (Cup)	3 - 1 vs Beitar Jerusalem	-	2 - 1 vs Hapoel Acre; 2 - 1 vs Hapoel Petah Tikva	3 - 1 vs Beitar Jerusalem
Biggest loss (Cup)	-	-	-	-
Biggest win (Toto)	1 - 0 vs Hapoel Ironi Kiryat Shmona	-	1 - 0 vs Hapoel Ironi Kiryat Shmona	-
Biggest loss (Toto)	1 - 4 vs Maccabi Haifa	1 - 4 vs Maccabi Haifa	-	-
Goals scored	61	29	29	3
Goals conceded	51	24	26	1
Goal difference	10	5	3	2
Clean sheets	16	7	8	1
Average GF per game	1.33	1.38	1.26	1.5
Average GA per game	1.11	1.14	1.13	0.5
Yellow cards	94	40	53	1
Red cards	6	4	2	0
Most appearances	(Israel) Dor Malul, (Israel) Maxim Plakuschenko (44)			
Most goals	(Israel) Alon Turgeman (17)			
Most Assist	(Israel) Hanan Maman (7)			
Penalties for	2	1	1	-
Penalties against	4	2	2	-
Winning rate	45.65%	47.62%	43.48%	50%

Last updated: Updated on 21 May 2018
Source: Competitive matches
