= 2018 Israel State Cup final =

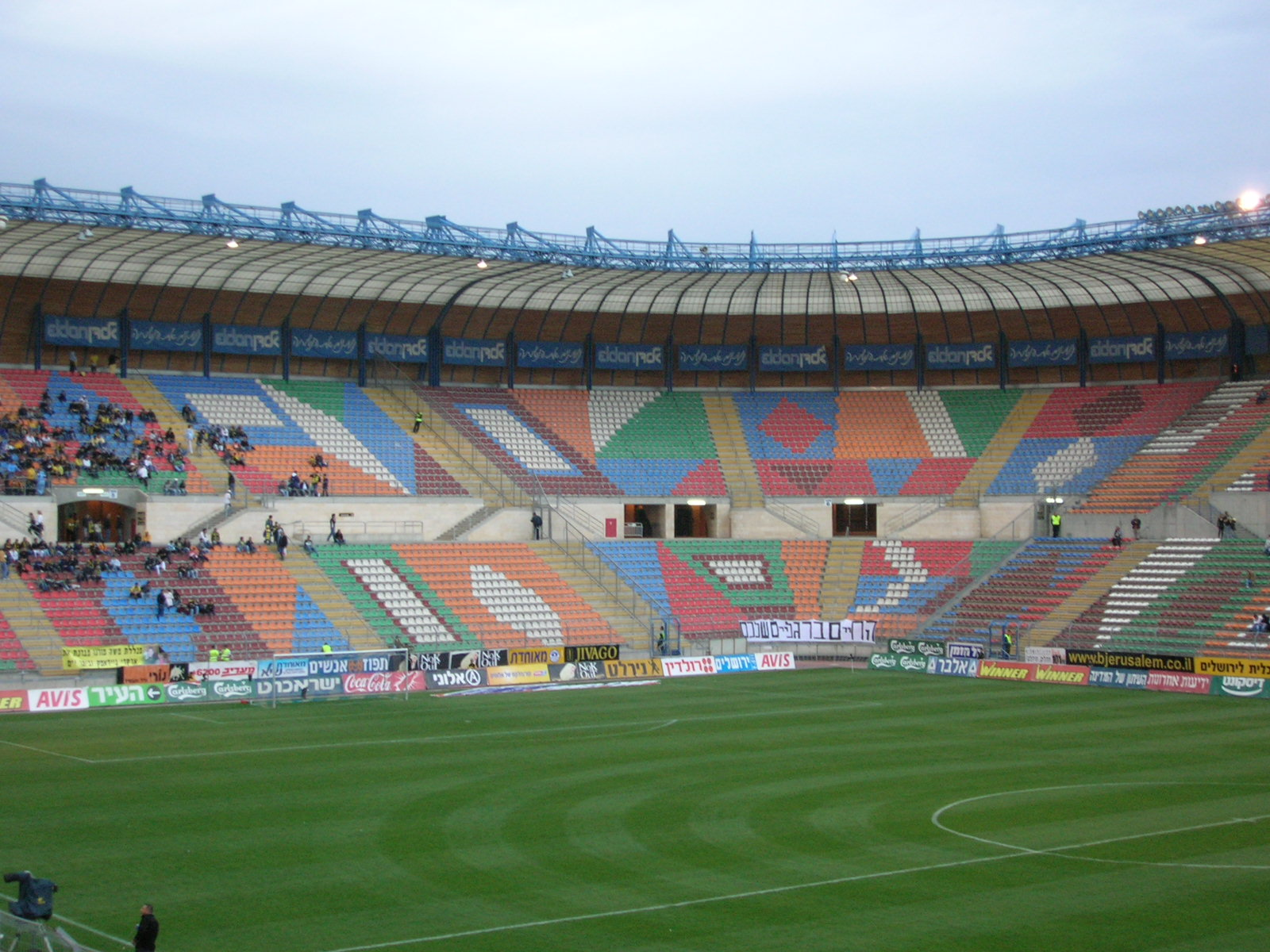
- Teddy Stadium in Jerusalem hosted the final
- Event: 2017–18 Israel State Cup
Hapoel Haifa	Beitar Jerusalem
3	1
- After extra time
- Date: 9 May 2018
- Venue: Teddy, Jerusalem
- Referee: Liran Liany

The 2018 Israel State Cup final decided the winner of the 2017–18 Israel State Cup, the 82nd season of Israel's main football cup. It will be played on 9 May 2018 at the Teddy Stadium in Jerusalem, between Beitar Jerusalem and Hapoel Haifa.

== Background ==
Beitar Jerusalem had previously played 10 Israel cup Finals, had won the competition a record 7 times. Their most recent appearance in the final was tin 2009, in which they won 2–1 against Maccabi Haifa.

Hapoel Haifa had previously played in 8 finals, winning 3. Their most recent appearance in the final was in 2004, in which they lost 4–1 to Bnei Sakhnin, and their most recent victory in the tournament was in 1974, beating Hapoel Petah Tikva 1–0.

The two teams played each other three times during the 2017–18 Israeli Premier League season until the final. In the first instance, on 16 September 2017 at Teddy Stadium the game end draw 3–3, in the two other times beitar win 2–0 and 1–0 on summy ofer.

== Road to the final ==
Hapoel Haifa		Round	Beitar Jerusalem
Opponent	Result	2017–18 Israel State Cup	Opponent	Result
Hapoel Petah Tikva	2–1	Eighth round	Hapoel Rishon LeZion	2–1
Hapoel Acre	2–1	Round of 16	Hapoel Marmorek	2–1
Maccabi Haifa	2–2	Quarter-finals first leg	Hapoel Kfar Saba	2–0
Maccabi Haifa	1–1	Quarter-finals second leg	Hapoel Kfar Saba	0–0
Hapoel Ra'anana A.F.C.	0–0 (4–3) after penalties	Semi-finals	Ironi Kiryat Shmona	3–2

=== Details ===
9 May 2018
20:45 CEST

Hapoel Haifa	3–1	Beitar Jerusalem
Plakuschenko 28'; Scheimann 105'; Turgeman 105+2'	Report	Varenne 29'

Teddy Stadium, Jerusalem
Referee: Liran Liany

Hapoel Haifa	Beitar Jerusalem

GK	13	(Lithuania) Ernestas Šetkus
RB	4	(Israel) Dor Malul
CB	55	(Israel) Nisso Kapiloto
CB	30	(Romania) Gabriel Tamaș
LB	18	(Israel) Samuel Scheimann
DM	6	(Israel) Gal Arel (substituted on) 103'
CM	14	(Moldova) Radu Gînsari
LM	7	(Israel) Maxim Plakuschenko
RW	15	(Israel) Gil Vermouth (substituted off) 116'
CF	9	(Israel) Eden Ben Basat (c) (substituted off) 113'
LF	17	(Israel) Alon Turgeman
Substitutes:
GK	1	(Israel) Ran Kadoch
DF	3	(Israel) Haim Megrelashvili
MF	2	(Sweden) Rasmus Sjöstedt (substituted on) 113'
DF	77	(Israel) Roslan Barsky
MF	22	(Croatia) Josip Ivančić
FW	51	(North Macedonia) Risto Mitrevski (substituted on) 103'
FW	99	(Israel) Maamun Qashua (substituted on) 116'
Manager:
(Israel) Nir Klinger

GK	1	(Israel) Boris Klaiman
RB	2	(France) Antoine Conte (yellow card) 91'
CB	6	(Israel) Tal Kachila
CB	13	(Israel) Sean Goldberg
LB	20	(Israel) Miki Siroshtein
DM	52	(Slovakia) Erik Sabo
CM	24	(Israel) Ofir Kriaf (substituted off) 97'
CM	14	(Brazil) Claudemir Ferreira
RW	18	(Israel) Hen Ezra
LW	25	(Israel) Gaëtan Varenne (substituted off) 106'
CF	9	(Israel) Itay Shechter (c) (substituted off) 62'
Substitutes:
GK	22	(Israel) Stav Shushan
DF	18	(Israel) Hen Dilmoni
DF	23	(Germany) Marcel Heister
FW	8	(Israel) Idan Vered (substituted on) 106'
MF	7	(Slovakia) Jakub Sylvestr (substituted on) 61'
MF	3	(Israel) David Keltjens (substituted on) 97'
FW	77	(Israel) Ya'akov Berihon
Manager:
(Israel) Benny Ben Zaken
