= 2017–18 Israeli Premier League =

Israeli Premier League
- Season: 2017–18
- Dates: 19 August 2017 – 21 May 2018
- Champions: Hapoel Be'er Sheva
- Champions League: Hapoel Be'er Sheva
- Europa League: Maccabi Tel Aviv; Beitar Jerusalem; Hapoel Haifa
- Matches: 240
- Goals: 622 (2.59 per match)
- Top goalscorer: (Israel) Dia Saba (24 goals)
- Biggest home win: Hapoel Be'er Sheva 6–1 Maccabi Netanya (21 May 2018)
- Biggest away win: Maccabi Netanya 1–5 Hapoel Be'er Sheva (22 April 2018)
- Highest scoring: Maccabi Tel Aviv 5–2 Hapoel Acre (29 October 2017); Hapoel Be'er Sheva 6–1 Maccabi Netanya (21 May 2018)
- Longest winning run: 6 matches Maccabi Tel Aviv
- Longest unbeaten run: 14 matches Maccabi Tel Aviv
- Longest winless run: 11 matches Hapoel Ashkelon
- Longest losing run: 8 matches Hapoel Ashkelon
- Highest attendance: 27,180; Maccabi Haifa 1–2 Beitar Jerusalem (21 October 2017)
- Total attendance: 1,296,236
- Average attendance: 6,114

The 2017–18 Israeli Premier League, also known as Ligat Winner for sponsorship reasons, was the nineteenth season since its introduction in 1999 and the 76th season of top-tier football in Israel. It began on 19 August 2017 and ended on 21 May 2018.

== Teams ==
A total of fourteen teams are competing in the league, including twelve sides from the 2016–17 season and two promoted teams from the 2016–17 Liga Leumit.

Hapoel Tel Aviv and Hapoel Kfar Saba were relegated to the 2017–18 Liga Leumit after finishing the 2016–17 Israeli Premier League in the bottom two places.

Maccabi Netanya and Hapoel Acre were promoted after finishing the 2016–17 Liga Leumit in the top two places. Both returned to league after one-year absence.

=== Stadiums and locations ===
Locations of the 2017–18 Israeli Premier League teams

Team	Location	Stadium	Capacity
Beitar Jerusalem	Jerusalem	Teddy Stadium	31,733
Bnei Sakhnin	Sakhnin	Doha Stadium	8,500
Bnei Yehuda	Tel Aviv	HaMoshava Stadium, Petah Tikva	11,500
F.C. Ashdod	Ashdod	Yud-Alef Stadium	7,800
Hapoel Acre	Acre	Acre Stadium	5,000
Hapoel Ashkelon	Ashkelon	Sala Stadium	5,250
Hapoel Be'er Sheva	Be'er Sheva	Turner Stadium	16,126
Hapoel Haifa	Haifa	Sammy Ofer Stadium	30,950
Hapoel Ra'anana	Ra'anana	Netanya Stadium, Netanya	13,610
Ironi Kiryat Shmona	Kiryat Shmona	Kiryat Shmona Stadium	5,300
Maccabi Haifa	Haifa	Sammy Ofer Stadium	30,950
Maccabi Netanya	Netanya	Netanya Stadium	13,610
Maccabi Petah Tikva	Petah Tikva	HaMoshava Stadium	11,500
Maccabi Tel Aviv	Tel Aviv	Netanya Stadium, Netanya	13,610

Netanya Stadium	HaMoshava Stadium	Sammy Ofer Stadium	
Hapoel Ra'anana; Maccabi Netanya; Maccabi Tel Aviv	Bnei Yehuda; Maccabi Petah Tikva	Hapoel Haifa; Maccabi Haifa	
Acre Stadium	Doha Stadium	Kiryat Shmona Stadium	
Hapoel Acre	Bnei Sakhnin	Ironi Kiryat Shmona	
Sala Stadium	Teddy Stadium	Turner Stadium	Yud-Alef Stadium
Hapoel Ashkelon	Beitar Jerusalem	Hapoel Be'er Sheva	F.C. Ashdod

=== Personnel and sponsorship ===
Team	President	Manager	Captain	Kitmaker	Shirt sponsor
Beitar Jerusalem	(Israel) Eli Tabib	(Israel) Benny Ben Zaken	(Israel) Itay Shechter	Givova	Brown Hotels
Bnei Sakhnin	(Israel) Mohammed Abu Yunes	(Israel) Tal Banin	(Israel) Khaled Khalaila	Givova	Scania
Bnei Yehuda	(Israel) Barak Obramov	(Israel) Yossi Abukasis	(Israel) Almog Buzaglo	Kappa	HAP
F.C. Ashdod	(Israel) Jacky Ben-Zaken	(Israel) Amir Turgeman	(Israel) Moshe Ohayon	Nike	SeeMe
Hapoel Acre	(Israel) Dan Lobalski	(Israel) Itzik Twizer	(Israel) Gal Shish	Kappa	Landora Group
Hapoel Ashkelon	(Israel) Municipality of Ashkelon	(Israel) Messay Dego	(Israel) Tal Makhlouf	Lotto	Albar
Hapoel Be'er Sheva	(Israel) Alona Barkat	(Israel) Barak Bakhar	(Israel) Elyaniv Barda	Puma	Tadiran
Hapoel Haifa	(Israel) Yoav Katz	(Israel) Nir Klinger	(Israel) Eden Ben Basat	Diadora	
Hapoel Ra'anana	(Israel) Asher Alon	(Israel) Meni Koretski	(Israel) Snir Shuker	Givova	
Ironi Kiryat Shmona	(Israel) Izzy Sheratzky	(Israel) Haim Silvas	(Israel) Itamar Nitzan	Umbro	Ituran
Maccabi Haifa	(Israel) Ya'akov Shahar	(Netherlands) Fred Rutten	(Israel) Rami Gershon	Nike	Honda
Maccabi Netanya	(Israel) Eyal Segal	(Israel) Slobodan Drapić	(Israel) Eran Levy	Lotto	Kesrei Thofa
Maccabi Petah Tikva	(Israel) Amos Luzon	(Israel) Sharon Mimer	(Israel) Naor Peser	Macron	Panorama North
Maccabi Tel Aviv	(Canada) Mitchell Goldhar	(Netherlands) Jordi Cruyff	(Israel) Sheran Yeini	—	

=== Foreign players ===
The number of foreign players is restricted to six per team, while only five can be registered to a game.

Club	Player 1	Player 2	Player 3	Player 4	Player 5	Player 6
Beitar Jerusalem	(Brazil) Claudemir	(Brazil) Georginho	(France) Antoine Conte	(Germany) Marcel Heister	(Slovakia) **Erik Sabo**	(Slovakia) Jakub Sylvestr
Bnei Sakhnin	(Brazil) Wanderson	(Croatia) Antonio Mršić	(France) Jordan Faucher	(Nigeria) Akpan David Udoh	(Spain) Abraham Paz	
Bnei Yehuda	(Republic of the Congo) **Mavis Tchibota**	(Lithuania) **Nerijus Valskis**	(Lithuania) **Emilijus Zubas**			
F.C. Ashdod	(Brazil) Mauricio	(Bulgaria) Viktor Genev	(Croatia) Karlo Bručić	(Nigeria) Blessing Eleke		
Hapoel Acre	(Belgium) Dylan Damraoui	(France) Mohamadou Sissoko	(Nigeria) Aliko Bala	(Nigeria) Bruno Ibeh	(Nigeria) Peter Onyekachi	
Hapoel Ashkelon	(Central African Republic) **David Manga**	(Croatia) Mirko Oremuš	(Georgia (country)) **Vladimir Dvalishvili**	(Nigeria) **Dele Aiyenugba**	(Serbia) **Branislav Jovanović**	(Serbia) **Milan Smiljanić**
Hapoel Be'er Sheva	(Czech Republic) **Tomáš Pekhart**	(Hungary) **Mihály Korhut**	(Nigeria) **Anthony Nwakaeme**	(Nigeria) **John Ogu**	(Portugal) Miguel Vítor	(Spain) Isaac Cuenca
Hapoel Haifa	(Croatia) Josip Ivančić	(Lithuania) **Ernestas Šetkus**	(North Macedonia) Risto Mitrevski	(Moldova) **Radu Gînsari**	(Romania) **Gabriel Tamaș**	(Sweden) Rasmus Sjöstedt
Hapoel Ra'anana	(Bolivia) **Guillermo Vizcarra**	(Guinea) Mohamed Aly Camara	(Montenegro) **Nemanja Nikolić**	(Zambia) **Emmanuel Mayuka**	(Zambia) **Emmanuel Mbola**	
Ironi Kiryat Shmona	(Brazil) Marcus Diniz	(Ivory Coast) Didier Brossou	(Netherlands) Nigel Hasselbaink	(Portugal) Afonso Taira	(Serbia) Miloš Radivojević	(Spain) Carlos Cuéllar
Maccabi Haifa	(Brazil) Allyson	(Brazil) Caio	(Bulgaria) **Georgi Kostadinov**	(Cameroon) **Ernest Mabouka**	(Greece) **Stefanos Athanasiadis**	(Netherlands) Etiënne Reijnen
Maccabi Netanya	(Brazil) Leandro Ribeiro	(Croatia) Branko Vrgoč	(Germany) Tim Heubach	(Guinea) **Alhassane Keita**	(Niger) **Ali Mohamed**	(Togo) Didier Kougbenya
Maccabi Petah Tikva	(Brazil) Elivelto	(Brazil) Romário	(Czech Republic) **Tomáš Sivok**	(France) Johan Martial	(France) Grégory Tadé	(Guinea) **Richard Soumah**
Maccabi Tel Aviv	(Iceland) **Viðar Örn Kjartansson**	(Italy) Cristian Battocchio	(Martinique) **Jean-Sylvain Babin**	(Serbia) **Predrag Rajković**	(Spain) José Rodríguez	

In bold: Players that have been capped for their national team.

=== Managerial changes ===
Team	Outgoing manager	Manner of departure	Date of vacancy	Position in table	Incoming manager	Date of appointment
Ironi Kiryat Shmona	Tomer Kashtan	End of contract	1 June 2017	Pre-season	Haim Silvas	1 June 2017
Hapoel Ra'anana	Haim Silvas	Released	1 June 2017	Pre-season	Dudu Avraham	1 June 2017
Bnei Yehuda	Kfir Edri	Signing of permanent manager	1 June 2017	Pre-season	Yossi Abukasis	1 June 2017
Bnei Sakhnin	Yossi Abukasis	End of contract	1 June 2017	Pre-season	(Brazil) Jairo Swirsky	8 June 2017
Maccabi Tel Aviv	(Angola) Lito Vidigal	Sacked	14 June 2017	Pre-season	(Netherlands) Jordi Cruyff	14 June 2017
F.C. Ashdod	Ran Ben Shimon	Released	5 July 2017	Pre-season	Yossi Mizrahi (temporary)	16 July 2017
Bnei Sakhnin	(Brazil) Jairo Swirsky	Sacked	1 August 2017	Pre-season	Ayman Khalaila (temporary)	1 August 2017
F.C. Ashdod	Yossi Mizrahi (temporary)	Signing of permanent manager	3 August 2017	Pre-season	Reuven Atar	3 August 2017
Bnei Sakhnin	Ayman Khalaila (temporary)	Signing of permanent manager	9 August 2017	Pre-season	Felix Naim	9 August 2017
Beitar Jerusalem	Sharon Mimer	Sacked	16 August 2017	Pre-season	Gili Lavanda (caretaker)	16 August 2017
Hapoel Ra'anana	Dudu Avraham	Sacked	16 September 2017	13th	Guy Levy	18 September 2017
Maccabi Petah Tikva	Kobi Refua	Resign	17 September 2017	11th	Sharon Mimer	17 September 2017
Beitar Jerusalem	Gili Lavanda (caretaker)	Caretaking spell over	1 October 2017	1st	Benny Ben Zaken	1 October 2017
F.C. Ashdod	Reuven Atar	Sacked	3 October 2017	14th	Amir Turgeman	10 October 2017
Hapoel Ra'anana	Guy Levy	Sacked	15 October 2017	14th	Meni Koretski	30 October 2017
Hapoel Acre	Shlomi Dora	Sacked	23 October 2017	14th	Eldad Shavit	25 October 2017
Maccabi Haifa	Guy Luzon	Mutual contract termination	9 December 2017	8th	(Netherlands) Rob Maas (caretaker)	9 December 2017
Bnei Sakhnin	Felix Naim	Sacked	5 January 2018	8th	Tal Banin	18 January 2018
Hapoel Acre	Eldad Shavit	Resign	16 January 2018	14th	Itzik Twizer	16 January 2018
Maccabi Haifa	(Netherlands) Rob Maas (caretaker)	Caretaking spell over	24 January 2018	10th	(Netherlands) Fred Rutten	24 January 2018
Hapoel Ashkelon	Yuval Naim	Sacked	12 February 2018	13th	Messay Dego	14 February 2018
F.C. Ashdod	Amir Turgeman	Sacked	24 April 2018	12th	Yossi Mizrahi (temporary)	24 April 2018

== Regular season ==
=== Regular season table ===
Pos	Team	Pld	W	D	L	GF	GA	GD	Pts	Qualification or relegation
1	Hapoel Be'er Sheva	26	17	6	3	43	18	+25	57	Qualification for the Championship round
2	Beitar Jerusalem	26	17	5	4	60	30	+30	56	Qualification for the Championship round
3	Maccabi Tel Aviv	26	16	7	3	44	20	+24	55	Qualification for the Championship round
4	Hapoel Haifa	26	15	7	4	36	21	+15	52	Qualification for the Championship round
5	Maccabi Netanya	26	12	9	5	43	29	+14	45	Qualification for the Championship round
6	Bnei Yehuda	26	11	7	8	32	26	+6	40	Qualification for the Championship round
7	Maccabi Petah Tikva	26	9	6	11	30	35	−5	33	Qualification for the Relegation round
8	Ironi Kiryat Shmona	26	9	5	12	28	30	−2	32	Qualification for the Relegation round
9	Bnei Sakhnin	26	8	6	12	24	35	−11	30	Qualification for the Relegation round
10	Maccabi Haifa	26	6	7	13	26	33	−7	25	Qualification for the Relegation round
11	Hapoel Ra'anana	26	6	6	14	23	40	−17	24	Qualification for the Relegation round
12	F.C. Ashdod	26	4	9	13	22	39	−17	21	Qualification for the Relegation round
13	Hapoel Ashkelon	26	3	8	15	19	39	−20	17	Qualification for the Relegation round
14	Hapoel Acre (Note: Hapoel Acre were deducted 2 points; 2 were deducted points due to violations of contract rules (reduced from the original 3 point deduction) and another 2 points due fielding 6 foreigners in a match against Maccabi Petah Tikva on fixture 10(was returned on the 20th of December).)	26	4	2	20	19	54	−35	12	Qualification for the Relegation round

Source: Israel Football Association, Soccerway
Rules for classification: 1) Points; 2) Goal difference; 3) Matches won; 4) Goals scored; 5) Head-to-head points; 6) Head-to-head goal difference; 7) Head-to-head goals scored; 8) Play-off.

=== Regular season results ===
Home \ Away	BEI	BnS	BnY	ASH	HAS	HBS	HHA	HAC	HRA	MNE	IKS	MHA	MPT	MTA
Beitar Jerusalem		4–2	2–0	4–1	2–0	2–2	3–3	3–0	3–2	4–1	1–1	3–1	1–0	1–2
Bnei Sakhnin	3–2		2–2	0–0	2–1	1–3	0–1	2–1	2–1	0–0	1–2	1–0	0–2	0–1
Bnei Yehuda	3–2	3–0		1–2	3–1	0–1	0–1	2–1	1–0	0–1	1–0	2–0	2–1	0–0
F.C. Ashdod	1–3	1–2	1–1		1–1	1–3	1–1	3–2	0–1	0–3	0–2	0–0	1–2	0–0
Hapoel Ashkelon	1–3	0–2	1–1	1–2		0–1	0–0	2–1	0–1	1–1	0–0	0–0	1–3	2–2
Hapoel Be'er Sheva	1–1	2–0	0–0	2–0	1–0		1–1	3–1	3–1	1–1	3–1	2–0	3–0	2–1
Hapoel Haifa	0–2	1–0	2–1	1–0	3–1	1–1		4–0	2–0	2–0	0–2	1–0	2–0	2–2
Hapoel Acre	1–3	1–2	1–1	1–0	0–1	0–1	0–1		0–2	0–3	0–3	2–0	0–3 (Note: match originally ended 0-1 loss, while acre fielding 6 foreigners, IFA declared it as a technical loss)	0–2
Hapoel Ra'anana	0–2	1–1	1–1	2–1	0–3	1–3	1–1	0–1		0–3	0–0	0–3	0–0	0–1
Maccabi Netanya	2–1	1–1	1–2	2–2	2–0	1–0	2–0	2–2	2–2		3–1	1–1	4–0	2–3
Ironi Kiryat Shmona	1–1	0–0	2–1	1–2	1–0	0–1	0–1	4–0	0–2	1–2		1–0	3–1	1–2
Maccabi Haifa	1–2	2–0	0–2	1–0	1–1	3–1	0–3	0–1	4–2	1–2	4–0		1–1	1–3
Maccabi Petah Tikva	1–2	1–0	1–2	1–1	3–0	0–2	0–2	2–1	3–2	1–1	2–0	2–2		0–0
Maccabi Tel Aviv	0–3	2–0	2–0	1–1	3–1	1–0	4–0	5–2	0–1	3–0	2–1	0–0	2–0	

Source: Israel Football Association
Legend: Blue = home team win; Yellow = draw; Red = away team win.

=== Positions by round ===
Team \ Round	1	2	3	4	5	6	7	8	9	10	11	12	13	14	15	16	17	18	19	20	21	22	23	24	25	26
Hapoel Be'er Sheva	7	12	8	6	6	10	5	4	4	3	2	2	1	1	1	1	1	1	2	1	2	2	1	2	1	1
Beitar Jerusalem	1	1	1	1	1	3	2	2	2	2	3	3	3	3	3	3	2	3	3	3	3	3	2	3	2	2
Maccabi Tel Aviv	13	7	3	3	3	4	3	5	3	4	4	4	4	4	4	4	4	2	1	2	1	1	3	1	3	3
Hapoel Haifa	2	2	2	2	2	1	1	1	1	1	1	1	2	2	2	2	3	4	4	4	4	4	4	4	4	4
Maccabi Netanya	6	8	5	8	4	2	4	3	5	5	5	5	5	5	5	5	5	6	6	5	5	5	5	5	5	5
Bnei Yehuda	3	4	6	9	11	9	10	11	9	7	9	6	6	6	6	6	6	5	5	6	6	6	6	6	6	6
Maccabi Petah Tikva	4	6	10	11	10	11	11	8	10	11	10	10	9	10	10	10	10	7	8	8	7	7	8	7	7	7
Ironi Kiryat Shmona	9	9	7	4	5	7	8	9	6	8	6	7	7	7	7	7	8	9	7	7	8	8	7	8	9	8
Bnei Sakhnin	5	3	4	5	9	6	7	7	7	9	8	9	10	8	8	8	7	8	9	9	9	10	9	9	8	9
Maccabi Haifa	12	5	9	7	8	5	6	6	8	6	7	8	8	9	9	9	9	10	10	10	10	9	10	10	10	10
Hapoel Ra'anana	8	10	13	13	13	13	14	13	13	14	12	12	12	12	12	12	12	12	11	11	12	11	11	11	11	11
F.C. Ashdod	10	13	14	14	14	14	13	12	12	13	14	13	13	13	13	13	13	13	13	13	11	12	12	12	12	12
Hapoel Ashkelon	11	11	12	10	7	8	9	10	11	10	11	11	11	11	11	11	11	11	12	12	13	13	13	13	13	13
Hapoel Acre	14	14	11	12	12	12	12	14	14	12	13	14	14	14	14	14	14	14	14	14	14	14	14	14	14	14

== Championship round ==
Key numbers for pairing determination (number marks position after 26 games)

Rounds
27th	28th	29th	30th	31st	32nd	33rd	34th	35th	36th
1 – 6; 2 – 5; 3 – 4	1 – 2; 5 – 3; 6 – 4	2 – 6; 3 – 1; 4 – 5	1 – 4; 2 – 3; 6 – 5	3 – 6; 4 – 2; 5 – 1	6 – 1; 5 – 2; 4 – 3	2 – 1; 3 – 5; 4 – 6	6 – 2; 1 – 3; 5 – 4	3 – 2; 4 – 1; 5 – 6	6 – 3; 2 – 4; 1 – 5

=== Championship round table ===
Pos	Team	Pld	W	D	L	GF	GA	GD	Pts	Qualification
1	Hapoel Be'er Sheva (C)	36	24	8	4	70	27	+43	80	Qualification for the Champions League first qualifying round
2	Maccabi Tel Aviv	36	21	8	7	60	33	+27	71	Qualification for the Europa League first qualifying round
3	Beitar Jerusalem	36	20	8	8	75	51	+24	68	Qualification for the Europa League first qualifying round
4	Hapoel Haifa	36	17	11	8	48	39	+9	62	Qualification for the Europa League second qualifying round (Note: Hapoel Haifa qualified for the Europa League second qualifying round by winning the 2017–18 Israel State Cup.)
5	Maccabi Netanya	36	16	10	10	59	54	+5	58	
6	Bnei Yehuda Tel Aviv	36	13	10	13	47	41	+6	49	

Source: Israel Football Association, Soccerway
Rules for classification: 1) Points; 2) Goal difference; 3) Matches won; 4) Goals scored; 5) Head-to-head points; 6) Head-to-head goal difference; 7) Head-to-head goals scored; 8) Play-off.
(C) Champions
Notes:

2017–18 Israeli Premier League champions

Hapoel Be'er Sheva
5th title

=== Championship round results ===
Home \ Away	BEI	BnY	HBS	HHA	MNE	MTA
Beitar Jerusalem		1–1	1–4	1–1	2–0	3–2
Bnei Yehuda	3–3		1–1	3–0	1–3	0–2
Hapoel Be'er Sheva	3–1	1–0		2–2	6–1	0–1
Hapoel Haifa	0–1	2–1	1–4		1–1	2–2
Maccabi Netanya	4–1	0–5	1–5	2–1		4–1
Maccabi Tel Aviv	3–1	2–0	0–1	1–2	2–0	

Source: Israel Football Association
Legend: Blue = home team win; Yellow = draw; Red = away team win.

=== Positions by round ===
Team/ Round	26	27	28	29	30	31	32	33	34	35	36
Hapoel Be'er Sheva	1	1	1	1	1	1	1	1	1	1	1
Maccabi Tel Aviv	3	3	3	4	4	3	3	3	3	2	2
Beitar Jerusalem	2	2	2	2	2	2	2	2	2	3	3
Hapoel Haifa	4	4	4	3	3	4	4	4	4	4	4
Maccabi Netanya	5	5	5	5	5	5	5	5	5	5	5
Bnei Yehuda	6	6	6	6	6	6	6	6	6	6	6

2018–19 UEFA Champions League First qualifying round
2018–19 UEFA Europa League Second qualifying round
2018–19 UEFA Europa League First qualifying round

== Relegation round ==
Key numbers for pairing determination (number marks position after 26 games)

Rounds
27th	28th	29th	30th	31st	32nd	33rd
7 – 11; 8 – 13; 9 – 12; 10 – 14	11 - 14; 12 - 10; 13 - 9; 7 - 8	8 - 11; 9 - 7; 10 – 13; 14 - 12	11 - 12; 13 - 14; 7 - 10; 8 - 9	9 - 11; 10 - 8; 14 - 7; 12 - 13	11 - 13; 7 - 12; 8 - 14; 9 -10	10 - 11; 14 - 9; 12 - 8; 13 - 7

=== Relegation round table ===
Pos	Team	Pld	W	D	L	GF	GA	GD	Pts	Relegation
7	Ironi Kiryat Shmona	33	13	6	14	39	36	+3	45	
8	Maccabi Petah Tikva	33	12	7	14	40	44	−4	43	
9	Hapoel Ra'anana	33	11	7	15	36	45	−9	40	
10	Maccabi Haifa	33	10	8	15	38	39	−1	38	
11	Bnei Sakhnin	33	10	8	15	32	47	−15	38	
12	F.C. Ashdod	33	6	10	17	29	48	−19	28	
13	Hapoel Ashkelon (R)	33	4	9	20	23	51	−28	21	Relegation to Liga Leumit
14	Hapoel Acre (Note: Hapoel Acre were deducted 2 points; 2 were deducted points due to violations of contract rules (reduced from the original 3 point deduction) and another 2 points due fielding 6 foreigners in a match against Maccabi Petah Tikva on fixture 10(was returned on the 20th of December).) (R)	33	6	4	23	26	67	−41	20	Relegation to Liga Leumit

Source: Israel Football Association, Soccerway
Rules for classification: 1) Points; 2) Goal difference; 3) Matches won; 4) Goals scored; 5) Head-to-head points; 6) Head-to-head goal difference; 7) Head-to-head goals scored; 8) Play-off.
(R) Relegated

=== Relegation round results ===
Home \ Away	BnS	ASH	HAS	HAC	HRA	IKS	MHA	MPT
Bnei Sakhnin		2–1			1–3		1–1	2–2
F.C. Ashdod			1–0			1–2	2–1	
Hapoel Ashkelon	2–0			0–2				0–2
Hapoel Acre	1–2	1–1						2–1
Hapoel Ra'anana		1–0	4–0	1–1				
Ironi Kiryat Shmona	2–0		1–1	4–0	0–1			
Maccabi Haifa			2–1	4–0	2–0	1–2		
Maccabi Petah Tikva		2–1			1–3	2–0	0–1	

Source: Israel Football Association
Legend: Blue = home team win; Yellow = draw; Red = away team win.

=== Positions by round ===
Team/ Round	26	27	28	29	30	31	32	33
Ironi Kiryat Shmona	8	7	8	9	8	7	7	7
Maccabi Petah Tikva	7	8	7	7	7	8	8	8
Hapoel Ra'anana	11	11	11	11	10	9	9	9
Maccabi Haifa	10	10	10	10	9	10	10	10
Bnei Sakhnin	9	9	9	8	11	11	11	11
F.C. Ashdod	12	12	12	12	12	12	12	12
Hapoel Ashkelon	13	13	13	13	13	13	13	13
Hapoel Acre	14	14	14	14	14	14	14	14

Relegation to 2018–19 Liga Leumit

== Season statistics ==
=== Top scorers ===
Rank	Scorer	Club	Goals
1	(Israel) Dia Saba	Maccabi Netanya	24
2	(Iceland) Viðar Kjartansson	Maccabi Tel Aviv	13
3	(Israel) Eden Ben Basat	Hapoel Haifa	12
3	(Israel) Hanan Maman	Hapoel Haifa/Hapoel Be'er Sheva	12
3	(Israel) Alon Turgeman	Hapoel Haifa	12
6	(Israel) Ben Sahar	Hapoel Be'er Sheva	11
7	(Australia) Nikita Rukavytsya	Maccabi Haifa	10
7	(Czech Republic) Tomáš Pekhart	Hapoel Be'er Sheva	10
7	(Israel) Shimon Abuhatzira	Hapoel Raanana	10
7	(England) Nick Blackman	Maccabi Tel Aviv	10
7	(Nigeria) Anthony Nwakaeme	Hapoel Be'er Sheva	10
7	(Israel) Lidor Cohen	Maccabi Petah Tikva	10
7	(Israel) Omer Atzili	Maccabi Tel Aviv	10
7	(Israel) Eran Levy	Maccabi Netanya	10
7	(France) Jordan Faucher	Bnei Sakhnin	10
17	3 different players	2 different teams	9

Source: (Hebrew)stats

=== Hat-tricks ===
Player	For	Against	Result	Date	Round	Reference
(Israel) Eden Ben Basat	Hapoel Haifa	Beitar Jerusalem	3–3 (A)	16 September 2017	4	
(Israel) Dia Saba	Maccabi Netanya	Maccabi Petah Tikva	4–0	2 October 2017	6	
(Israel) Alon Turgeman	Hapoel Haifa	Hapoel Acre	4–0	14 October 2017	7	
(Israel) Eliran Atar	Maccabi Tel Aviv	Hapoel Acre	5–2	29 October 2017	9	
(Israel) Dia Saba	Maccabi Netanya	Maccabi Tel Aviv	4–1	3 April 2018	28	
(Israel) Guy Melamed	Hapoel Be'er Sheva	Maccabi Netanya	6–1	21 May 2018	36	

== Attendances ==
No.	Club	Average attendance	Change	Highest
1	Maccabi Haifa	16,899	-14,4%	28,114
2	Hapoel Be'er-Sheva	14,477	2,8%	15,712
3	Beitar Jerusalem	12,491	63,5%	24,000
4	Maccabi Tel Aviv	10,052	2,1%	12,400
5	Hapoel Haifa	6,862	53,5%	23,475
6	Maccabi Netanya	6,801	107,8%	12,500
7	Bnei Yehuda Tel Aviv	3,600	15,6%	9,000
8	Hapoel Ashkelon	2,593	-14,2%	5,200
9	Maccabi Petah Tikva	2,575	-40,9%	8,000
10	Ashdod	2,038	-12,1%	5,100
11	Hapoel Ironi Acre	1,758	153,0%	5,000
12	Hapoel Ra'anana	1,712	-7,0%	5,500
13	Bnei Sakhnin	1,604	-30,1%	4,000
14	Hapoel Ironi Kiryat Shmona	1,226	-11,8%	3,750
