= Ibeh =

Ibeh is a surname. Notable people with the surname include:

- Bruno Ibeh (born 1995), Nigerian footballer
- Buchie Ibeh (born 1983), American football player
- John Ibeh (born 1986), Nigerian footballer
- Prince Ibeh (born 1994), British-Rwandan basketball player
