= Idan Golan =

Israeli footballer

Personal information
- Full name: Idan Golan
- Date of birth: 29 February 1996 (age 30)
- Place of birth: Ramat Yishai, Israel
- Height: 1.75 m (5 ft 9 in)
- Position: Forward

Team information
- Current team: Hapoel Nof HaGalil
- Number: 10

Youth career
- 2007–2008: Hapoel Nazareth Ilit
- 2008–2015: Hapoel Haifa

Senior career*
Years	Team	Apps	(Gls)
2015–2018	Hapoel Haifa	27	(1)
2018–2019	Hapoel Ramat Gan	20	(0)
2019–2020	Hapoel Nof HaGalil	29	(2)
2020–2021	Universitatea Cluj	20	(5)
2021–2022	Voluntari	8	(0)
2022–2023	Ironi Tiberias	26	(6)
2023–2024	Gloria Buzău	6	(0)
2024–2025	Hapoel Acre	3	(0)
2025	Hapoel Umm al-Fahm	20	(5)
2025–	Hapoel Nof HaGalil	33	(4)
- * Club domestic league appearances and goals as of 1 June 2026

Idan Golan (Hebrew: עידן גולן; born 29 February 1996) is an Israeli footballer who plays as a forward for Hapoel Nof HaGalil.

== Career statistics ==
=== Club ===
As of 5 December 2023.

Club	Season	League			National Cup		League Cup		Continental		Other		Total	
Club	Season	Division	Apps	Goals	Apps	Goals	Apps	Goals	Apps	Goals	Apps	Goals	Apps	Goals
Hapoel Haifa	2014–15	Israeli Premier League	4	0	1	0	1	0	—		—		6	0
Hapoel Haifa	2015–16	Israeli Premier League	1	0	2	0	3	0	—		—		6	0
Hapoel Haifa	2016–17	Israeli Premier League	16	0	2	0	5	0	—		—		23	0
Hapoel Haifa	2017–18	Israeli Premier League	6	1	2	0	3	0	—		—		11	1
Hapoel Haifa	Total		27	1	7	0	12	0	—		—		46	1
Hapoel Ramat Gan	2018–19	Liga Leumit	20	0	1	0	2	0	—		—		23	0
Hapoel Nof HaGalil	2019–20	Liga Leumit	29	2	2	0	0	0	—		—		31	2
Universitatea Cluj	2020–21	Liga II	20	5	3	3	—		—		—		23	8
Voluntari	2021–22	Liga I	8	0	1	0	—		—		—		9	0
Ironi Tiberias	2022–23	Liga Leumit	26	6	3	0	0	0	—		—		29	6
Gloria Buzău	2023–24	Liga II	6	0	2	0	—		—		—		8	0
Career total			135	14	21	3	14	0	0	0	0	0	170	17

== Honours ==
=== Club ===
Hapoel Haifa

- Israel State Cup: 2017–18

Voluntari

- Cupa României runner-up: 2021–22
