= Karem Arshid =

Israeli association football player

Personal information
- Full name: Karem Arshid
- Date of birth: 24 January 1995 (age 31)
- Place of birth: Jadeidi-Makr, Israel
- Position: Forward

Team information
- Current team: Dimona
- Number: 14

Senior career*
Years	Team	Apps	(Gls)
2015–2020	Hapoel Ra'anana	96	(9)
2016–2017	→ Hapoel Afula	32	(12)
2020–2021	Hapoel Hadera	9	(0)
2021–2022	Sektzia Ness Ziona	17	(1)
2021–2022	Hapoel Acre	12	(0)
2022	Maccabi Bnei Reineh	17	(0)
2022–2023	Hapoel Acre	32	(5)
2023–2024	Ihud Bnei Shefa-'Amr	25	(3)
2024–2025	F.C. Tirat HaCarmel	11	(2)
2025	Hapoel Umm al-Fahm	14	(0)
2025–	Dimona	10	(0)
- * Club domestic league appearances and goals as of 15 December 2025

Karem Arshid (Arabic: كارم ارشيد, Hebrew: כרם ארשיד; born 24 January 1995) is an Israeli professional footballer who plays as a forward for Liga Alef club Dimona.

== Career ==
On 7 June 2022 signed for Hapoel Acre.
