= Maxim Plakuschenko =

Israeli footballer

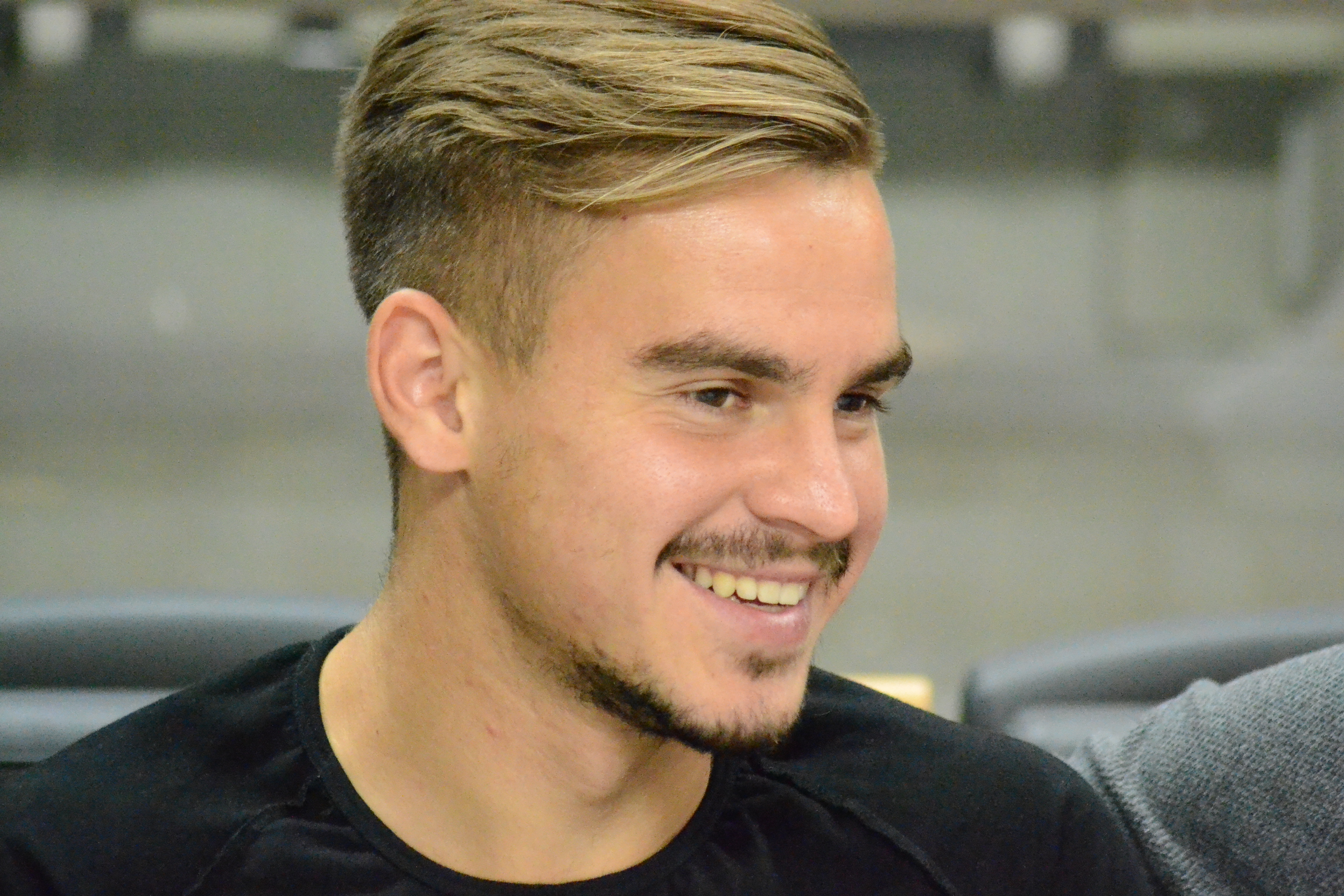
- Plakuschenko in 2017

Personal information
- Date of birth: January 4, 1996 (age 30)
- Place of birth: Vinnytsia, Ukraine
- Height: 1.72 m (5 ft 8 in)
- Position: Midfielder

Youth career
- Hapoel Haifa

Senior career*
Years	Team	Apps	(Gls)
2013–2019	Hapoel Haifa	87	(13)
2019–2022	Maccabi Haifa	43	(1)
2020–2022	→ Hapoel Hadera (loan)	52	(11)
2022–2023	Budapest Honvéd	17	(0)
2023–2026	Maccabi Netanya	82	(12)

International career
2012	Israel U17	2	(0)
2013–2014	Israel U18	5	(1)
2014	Israel U19	5	(0)
2016–2018	Israel U21	17	(3)
- * Club domestic league appearances and goals as of 27 June 2025

Maxim "Max" Plakuschenko (Hebrew: מקסים ״מקס״ פלקושצ'נקו, Ukrainian: Максим Плакущенко; born January 4, 1996) is a professional footballer. Born in Ukraine, he has represented Israel at youth level.

== Early life ==
Plakuschenko was born in Vinnytsia, Ukraine. At the age of 3, he immigrated to Israel with his family and resided in the city of Kiryat Ata.

== Club career ==
By the age of 6, he began to play football in the youth division of Hapoel Haifa. On 21 February 2015, he made his debut in the club's senior team, when he entered as a substitute in the 90th minute in a 2–0 win over Maccabi Tel Aviv. On 23 January 2019, he joined Maccabi Haifa on a 3.5 year deal worth €150,000 per season

In June 2023, Plakuschenko returned to Israel with Maccabi Netanya following a short spell in Hungary with Budapest Honvéd.

== International career ==
Plakuschenko is capped as a youth International for Israel.

In 2018 he was called up for the Israel national football team.

== Honours ==
=== Club ===
Hapoel Haifa

- Israel State Cup (1): 2017–18
- Israel Super Cup (1): 2018–19

== See also ==
- List of Israelis
