= Dor Malul =

Israeli footballer

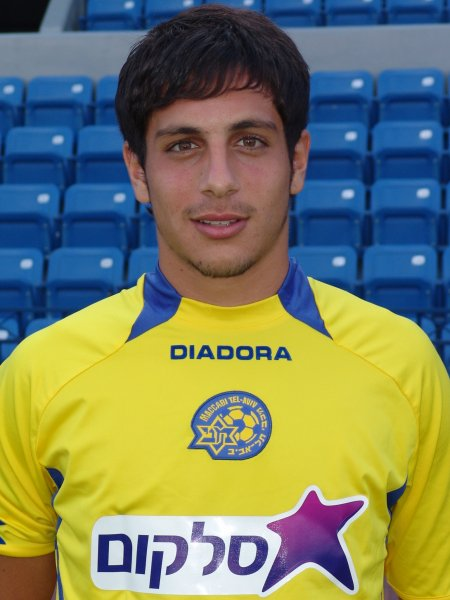
- Malul with Maccabi Tel Aviv

Personal information
- Full name: Dor Malul
- Date of birth: April 30, 1989 (age 37)
- Place of birth: Rishon LeZion, Israel
- Height: 1.81 m (5 ft 11 in)
- Positions: Midfielder; defender

Team information
- Current team: Hapoel Haifa
- Number: 4

Youth career
- 2003–2008: Maccabi Tel Aviv

Senior career*
Years	Team	Apps	(Gls)
2006–2012	Maccabi Tel Aviv	81	(1)
2011–2012	→ Beerschot AC (loan)	35	(1)
2012–2013	Beerschot AC	8	(0)
2013–2014	Beitar Jerusalem	11	(0)
2014–2015	Hapoel Be'er Sheva	21	(0)
2015–	Hapoel Haifa	320	(3)

International career^{‡}
2006	Israel U17	4	(0)
2006–2008	Israel U19	22	(2)
2008–2010	Israel U21	8	(1)
- * Club domestic league appearances and goals as of 24 June 2026 ‡ National team caps and goals as of 12 October 2010

Dor Malul (Hebrew: דור מלול; born April 30, 1989) is an Israeli professional footballer who plays for Hapoel Haifa.

== Career ==
Dor Malul is a rising player in Israeli football. Although he is a very technical player, over the years he has moved from the midfield to the defence. His evident talent has acquired him a call up to the 2007 Meridian Cup alongside other young stars like Bojan Krkić, Marko Marin, Vurnon Anita.

In July 2011, he signed a 1-year loan contract with Beerschot AC.

Iמ summer 2013 Beershot dissolved and Malul became a free agent. He began training at Beitar Jerusalem and impressed the team's players convinced the coach Eli Cohen to sign the player.

On 25 June 2014, he concluded two years for Hapoel Be'er Sheva.

== Honours ==
Hapoel Haifa

- Israel State Cup (1): 2017–18
