= Alon Turgeman =

Israeli footballer

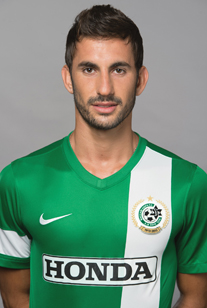
- Turgeman with Maccabi Haifa in 2013

Personal information
- Date of birth: 9 June 1991 (age 35)
- Place of birth: Hadera, Israel
- Height: 1.79 m (5 ft 10 1/2 in)
- Position: Forward

Team information
- Current team: Hapoel Haifa
- Number: 17

Youth career
- Beitar Nes Tubruk

Senior career*
Years	Team	Apps	(Gls)
2010–2011	Hapoel Petah Tikva	25	(6)
2011–2017	Maccabi Haifa	114	(30)
2016	→ Hapoel Tel Aviv (loan)	14	(1)
2016–2017	→ Bnei Yehuda (loan)	31	(4)
2017–2018	Hapoel Haifa	34	(12)
2018–2021	Austria Wien	28	(10)
2020	→ Wisła Kraków (loan)	9	(6)
2021–2023	Hapoel Haifa	69	(20)
2023–2026	Hapoel Be'er Sheva	85	(19)
2026–	Hapoel Haifa	11	(7)

International career^{‡}
2009–2010	Israel U19	9	(0)
2010–2013	Israel U21	11	(2)
2018	Israel	2	(0)
Medal record
Men's football
Representing Israel
Maccabiah Games
Bronze medal – third place	2009 Maccabiah
- * Club domestic league appearances and goals as of 24 June 2026 ‡ National team caps and goals as of 04:40, 10 February 2026 (UTC)

Alon Turgeman (Hebrew: אלון תורג'מן; born 9 June 1991) is an Israeli professional footballer who plays as a forward for Hapoel Haifa and is a former member of the Israel national team.

== Early life ==
Turgeman was born in Hadera, Israel, to a family of Jewish descent.

== Club career ==
He started to play football as a kid when he was part of Beitar Nes Tubruk. He represented Israel at the 2009 Maccabiah Games, winning a bronze medal.

In 2010, he moved to Hapoel Petah Tikva, and became a member of the senior side when he was 18 years old. In his only year with the senior team he made 30 caps, 8 goals and 2 assists and help the team to stay in the league.

On 7 August 2011 under the recommendation of Shlomo Scharf to the owner Ya'akov Shahar he signed with Israeli giants Maccabi Haifa. In his first season as a player of Maccabi Haifa Turgeman scored 7 goals and assist another 3 more in the first half of the season he came off the bench but in the second half of the season following the injury of Wiyam Amasha and the departure of Vladimir Dvalishvili he began to be in the starting 11.

in his second season with the team following the minority minutes that he received he considered to leave in January but after a call with manager Arik Benado he decided to stay and begin play more in the end of the season Turgeman scored 9 goals and assist another 3 more.

=== International career ===
Turgeman has played extensively for his nation at youth level from the under-19 side, to the under-21 side of which he took part in the 2013 UEFA European Under-21 Football Championship and scored one goal.

== Club career statistics ==
Club	Season	League		Cup		Toto Cup		Europe		Total	
Club	Season	Apps	Goals	Apps	Goals	Apps	Goals	Apps	Goals	Apps	Goals
Hapoel Petah Tikva	2010–11	25	7	1	0	4	1	0	0	30	8
Maccabi Haifa	2011–12	29	6	5	1	1	0	3	0	37	7
Maccabi Haifa	2012–13	21	6	2	2	6	1	0	0	29	9
Maccabi Haifa	2013–14	34	15	0	0	0	0	5	3	39	18
Maccabi Haifa	2014–15	23	3	2	0	7	2	0	0	32	5
Maccabi Haifa	2015–16	7	0	0	0	6	3	0	0	13	3
Hapoel Tel Aviv	2015–16	14	1	0	0	6	3	0	0	14	1
Bnei Yehuda	2016–17	9	3	0	0	0	0	0	0	9	3
Hapoel Haifa	2017–18	12	7	0	0	0	0	0	0	12	7
Career		99	22	8	3	11	2	8	3	102	28

== Honours ==
Bnei Yehuda

- Israel State Cup: 2016–17

Hapoel Haifa

- Israel State Cup: 2017–18

Hapoel Beer Sheva

- Israel State Cup: 2024–25
- Israel Super Cup: 2025
