= Ernestas Šetkus =

Lithuanian footballer

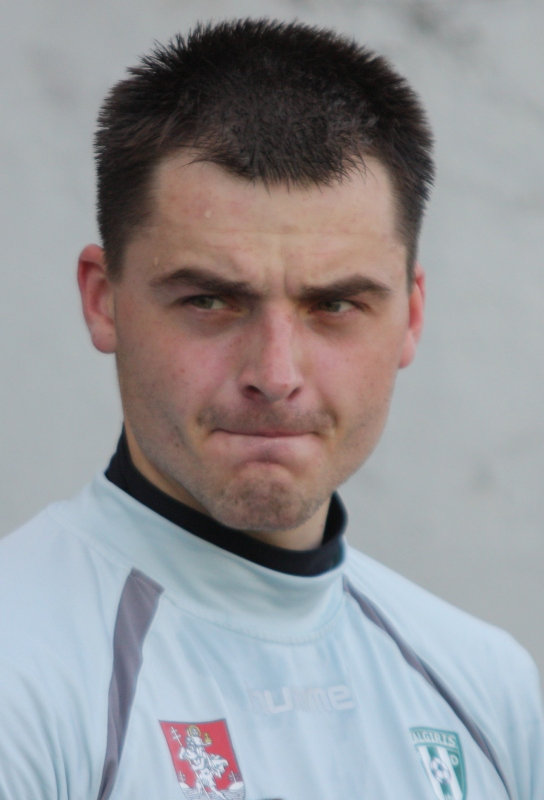
- Šetkus with Žalgiris in 2010

Personal information
- Date of birth: 25 May 1985 (age 41)
- Place of birth: Tauragė, Lithuanian SSR, Soviet Union
- Height: 1.90 m (6 ft 3 in)
- Position: Goalkeeper

Youth career
- Tauras
- Žalgiris

Senior career*
Years	Team	Apps	(Gls)
2005–2010	Žalgiris	96	(0)
2009	→ Tauras	24	(0)
2010–2012	Olympiakos Nicosia	40	(0)
2012–2013	Botev Plovdiv	11	(0)
2013	Gomel	2	(0)
2013–2014	Nea Salamina	31	(0)
2014–2015	Kerkyra	22	(0)
2015–2016	Sivasspor	32	(0)
2016–2017	ADO Den Haag	22	(0)
2017–2019	Hapoel Haifa	62	(0)
2019–2020	Hapoel Be'er Sheva	21	(0)
2020–2022	Hapoel Tel Aviv	60	(0)

International career^{‡}
	Lithuania U21	2	(0)
2011–2022	Lithuania	38	(0)
- * Club domestic league appearances and goals as of 1 June 2022 ‡ National team caps and goals as of 14 June 2022

Ernestas Šetkus (Lithuanian: Ernestas Šetkus; born 25 May 1985) is a retired Lithuanian professional footballer. He played for the Lithuania national team.

== Career ==
=== Early career ===
Šetkus started his senior career with Žalgiris first team in 2005, before moved to Tauras in 2009. For the 2010 season he returned to Žalgiris and earned 16 appearances in the A Lyga. Šetkus played the first match of his second spell at Žalgiris on 21 March 2010, a 1–1 draw against Tauras and kept seven clean sheets.

=== Cyprus, Bulgaria and Belarus ===
In August 2010, Šetkus joined Cyprus side Olympiakos Nicosia. He made his debut on 2 October 2010 against Paphos. During the 2010–11 season he kept two clean sheets in 18 league games. He began the following season as backup to his Latvian rival Andrejs Pavlovs. Šetkus played his first match of the campaign on 21 November 2011, keeping a clean sheet in the 0–0 draw against Aris Limassol. Later in the season Šetkus returned to be the senior goalkeeper of the team. On 7 January Šetkus got MVP of the Game award in a game against AEK Larnaca which finished 1–1. In April 2012 he was linked with Hibernian and Hearts.

During the summer of 2012, Šetkus signed a contract with newly promoted Parva liga club Botev Plovdiv. Šetkus made his official debut in the 3–0 home win over Slavia Sofia on 11 August 2012. On 31 January Šetkus was released from the club by Stanimir Stoilov. In March 2013 he was very close to sign a contract with Scottish side Kilmarnock.

On 28 March he signed short-term contract with Vysheyshaya Liga team Gomel. Few days later he got hamstring injury. After an injury on 23 June he made his first game in Vysheyshaya Liga in the 1–0 loss to Shakhtyor Soligorsk. A week later he helped his team to win 2–0 against Dynamo Brest keeping a clean sheet.

=== Greece, Turkey and the Netherlands ===
In July 2013, Šetkus came back to Cyprus signing a one-year contract with Nea Salamina. After the successful season in Cyprus, in July 2014, Šetkus signed one-year contract with Kerkyra playing in Super League Greece.

On the 2015–16 season Šetkus signed for Sivasspor from the Süper Lig for one year. At the end of the season he went down with his team to the TFF First League.

On the 2016–17 season, Šetkus signed ADO Den Haag from the Eredivisie for one year. At the end of the season, he finished with his team in 11th place in the Eredivisie.

=== Israel ===
On 12 July 2017, Šetkus signed Hapoel Haifa from Israeli Premier League for two seasons. On 2 August, Šetkus made his debut in a 0–1 loss to Hapoel Acre at Sammy Ofer Stadium in the Toto Cup. On 19 August, Šetkus made his debut in 3–1 victory over Hapoel Ashkelon at Sammy Ofer Stadium in the Israeli Premier League. On 9 May 2018, Šetkus helped his team win the Israel State Cup after 44 years after a 3–1 win over the Beitar Jerusalem at Teddy Stadium. At the end of the season Šetkus won the title of "goalkeeper of the season".

On 4 July 2018, Šetkus concluded his terms at Hapoel Be'er Sheva, but on 5 July, the deal was blown after Hapoel Haifa club owners changed the agreement between the teams on their own. January's transfer window signed Šetkus in the Beitar Jerusalem for two seasons, concluding with him joining next season. By the end of this season, Šetkus had made 30 appearances in the Israeli Premier League and was a part of the Hapoel Haifa campaign in the qualifying European League.

On 20 June 2019, Šetkus signed Hapoel Be'er Sheva for two seasons after receiving permission from Beitar Jerusalem to leave for no consideration. On 11 July, Šetkus made his debut in Hapoel Be'er Sheva uniforms in a 1–1 draw against Laçi as part of the UEFA Europa League at Laçi Stadium. On 25 August, Šetkus made his debut in the Israeli Premier League in a 0–0 draw against the Beitar Jerusalem at Teddy Stadium.

== International career ==
Šetkus was called up by Raimondas Žutautas to the full Lithuania national team squad for the friendly match against Poland. He made his debut on 25 March 2011 at the Darius and Girėnas Stadium, Kaunas. He came on at half time for Žydrūnas Karčemarskas with Lithuania 2–0 up.

On 3 June 2011, Šetkus made his first Lithuania start in their 2–0 loss in Vaduz against Liechtenstein in a Euro 2012 qualifying game.

On 7 June 2011, Šetkus played in a friendly game against Norway in Oslo. In 83rd minute he saved a penalty but Morten Gamst Pedersen scored on the rebound. The game finished 1–0 for Norway.

On 29 May 2012, Šetkus kept a clean sheet in a friendly game against Russia in Nyon, Switzerland.

Following the appointment of coach Edgaras Jankauskas to the Lithuania in June 2016, Šetkus became the team senior goalkeeper.

== Honours ==
Hapoel Haifa

- Israel State Cup: 2017–18
- Israel Super Cup: 2018

Hapoel Be'er Sheva

- Israel State Cup: 2019–20

Individual

- Goalkeeper of the season in Israel: 2017–18
- Lithuanian Footballer of the Year: 2019
