= Gal Shish =

Israeli footballer

Gal Shish גל שיש
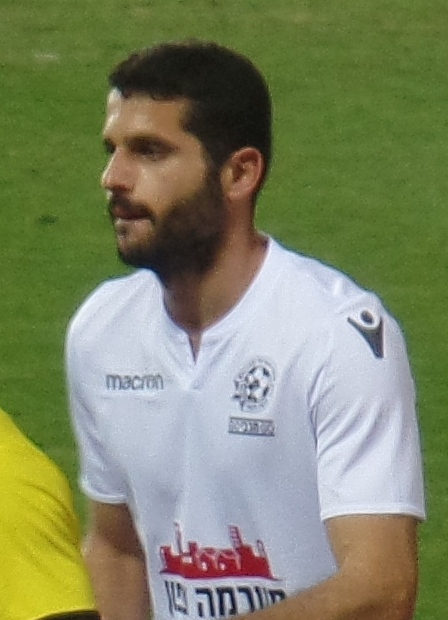
- Shish with Maccabi Petah Tikva in 2019

Personal information
- Full name: Gal Shish
- Date of birth: 28 January 1989 (age 37)
- Place of birth: Bat Yam, Israel
- Height: 1.84 m (6 ft 1/2 in)
- Position: Left back

Youth career
- Hapoel Tel Aviv

Senior career*
Years	Team	Apps	(Gls)
2007–2012	Hapoel Tel Aviv	58	(0)
2012–2013	Waasland-Beveren	24	(1)
2013–2015	Volyn Lutsk	36	(0)
2016–2017	Hapoel Tel Aviv	26	(0)
2017–2018	Hapoel Acre	31	(0)
2018–2019	Maccabi Petah Tikva	32	(0)
2019–2020	Ironi Kiryat Shmona	2	(0)

International career
2006	Israel U17	4	(0)
2007	Israel U18	2	(0)
2007–2008	Israel U19	13	(0)
2009–2010	Israel U21	2	(0)
2012–2013	Israel	3	(0)
- * Club domestic league appearances and goals

Gal Shish (Hebrew: גל שיש; born 28 January 1989) is an Israeli former professional footballer.

He is of a Tunisian-Jewish descent.

== Career ==
At international level, Shish was capped at levels from under-17 to under-21.

On 16 August 2012, Shish signed a two-years contract with Belgian Pro League side Waasland-Beveren. On 30 August 2013, Shish signed a three-years contract with Persha Liha side Volyn Lutsk. After two and a half years in Lutsk Shish came back to Israel to play for his youth club, Hapoel Tel Aviv FC.
