= Ran Kadoch =

Israeli footballer

Ran Kadoch רן קדוש
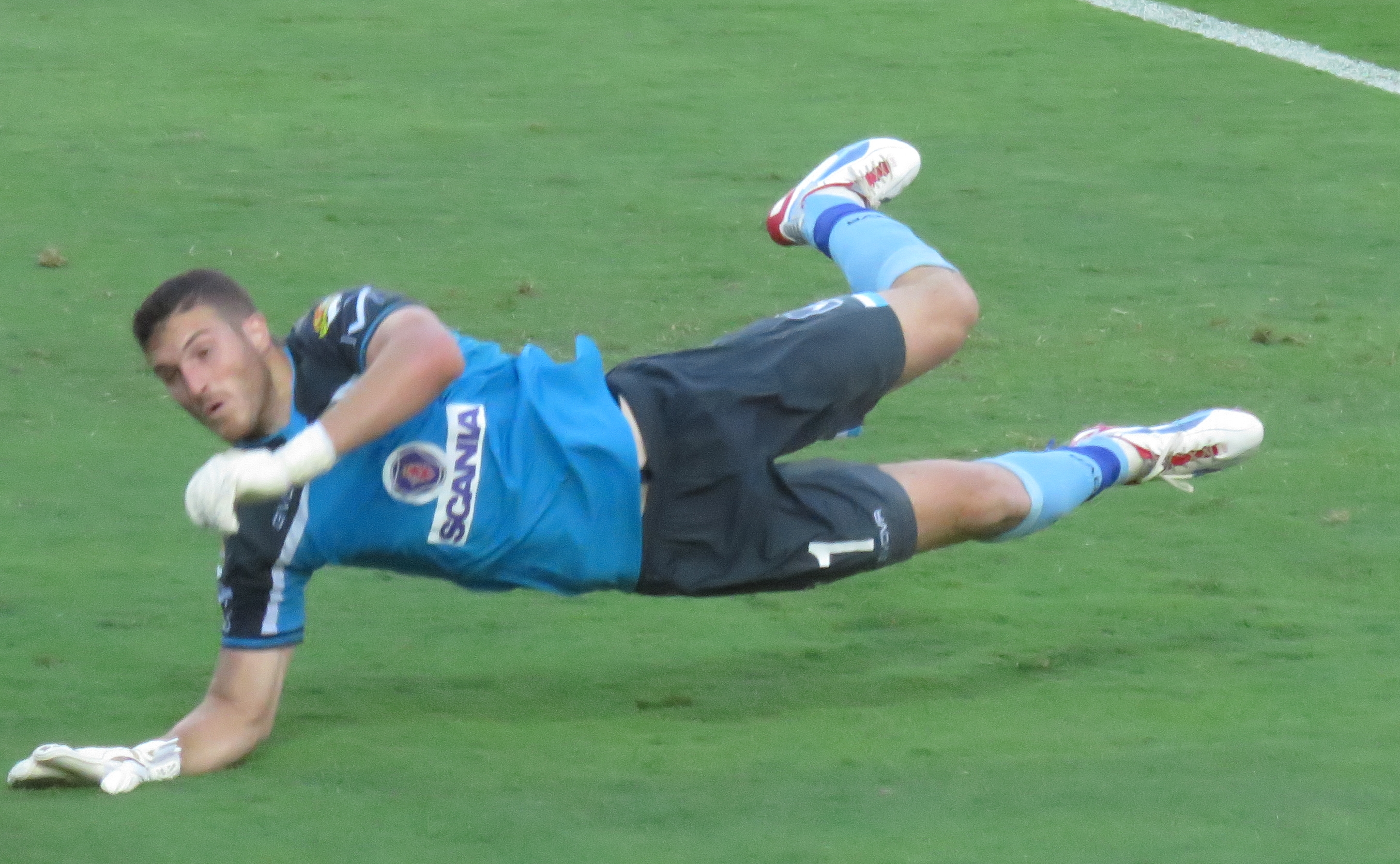
- Kadoch playing for Bnei Sakhnin in 2015

Personal information
- Date of birth: 4 October 1985 (age 41)
- Place of birth: Ma'ale Adumim, West Bank
- Height: 1.88 m (6 ft 2 in)
- Position: Goalkeeper

Senior career*
Years	Team	Apps	(Gls)
2003–2008	Hapoel Rishon LeZion	54	(0)
2006–2007	→ Hapoel Ra'anana (loan)	24	(0)
2007	→ Hapoel Bnei Lod (loan)	5	(0)
2007	→ Hakoah Amidar Ramat Gan (loan)	0	(0)
2007–2008	→ Sektzia Ness Ziona (loan)	31	(0)
2008–2009	Barnet	12	(0)
2009–2011	Bnei Yehuda Tel Aviv	8	(0)
2011–2012	→ Hapoel Haifa (loan)	6	(0)
2012–2013	→ Hapoel Asi Gilboa (loan)	15	(0)
2013–2013	→ Sektzia Ness Ziona (loan)	20	(0)
2013–2014	Maccabi Kiryat Malakhi	9	(0)
2014	Beitar Kfar Saba	23	(0)
2014–2016	Bnei Sakhnin	39	(0)
2016–2017	Hapoel Kfar Saba	33	(0)
2017–2021	Hapoel Haifa	34	(0)
2021–2022	Bnei Yehuda	9	(0)
2022–2023	Hapoel Haifa	1	(0)
Total		323	(0)
- * Club domestic league appearances and goals

Ran Kadoch (or Ran Kadosh, Hebrew: רן קדוש; born 4 October 1985) is an Israeli former professional footballer who played as a goalkeeper.

== Personal life ==
Kadoch holds a French passport.
