= Haim Megrelashvili =

Israeli footballer

Haim Megrelashvili חַיִּים מֶגְרֵלָשוִילִי
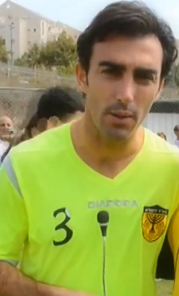
- Megrelashvili with Beitar Jerusalem in 2013

Personal information
- Date of birth: July 4, 1982 (age 44)
- Place of birth: Tirat Carmel, Israel
- Height: 1.76 m (5 ft 9 in)
- Position: Left back

Youth career
- Hapoel Haifa

Senior career*
Years	Team	Apps	(Gls)
2000–2004	Hapoel Haifa	87	(3)
2004–2007	Maccabi Haifa	66	(0)
2007–2009	Vitesse Arnhem	24	(1)
2009	→ Maccabi Tel Aviv (loan)	16	(2)
2010	Maccabi Petah Tikva	12	(0)
2010–2011	Alki Larnaca	25	(1)
2011–2012	Maccabi Haifa	2	(0)
2012	→ Beitar Jerusalem (loan)	14	(0)
2012–2013	Beitar Jerusalem	30	(1)
2013–2014	AEK Larnaca	29	(1)
2014–2018	Hapoel Haifa	85	(1)
- * Club domestic league appearances and goals as of 15 June 2016

Haim Megrelashvili (Hebrew: חיים מגרלשוילי; born July 4, 1982, in Tirat Carmel) is a retired Israeli football defender. For the bulk of his career he played for Hapoel Haifa. He joined Maccabi Haifa in 2003 from cross-town rival Hapoel Haifa, and within a short time became Israel's rookie of the year.

== Biography ==
Haim Megrelashvili is of Georgian Jewish ancestry and his surname literally means "son of Megrelia" in Georgian.

== Career ==
He started his football career at Maccabi Haifa as a schoolboy before concentrating on athletics and gymnastics. His brother, Akiva, continued playing football and joined Hapoel Kiryat Shmona. During his first season at Maccabi Haifa, he started a total of twenty-six matches. His second season at Haifa was far from a success: He started just seven games. Ronny Levy gave Megrelashvili more opportunities in the 2006/07 season and he played an integral part of the squad's progression to the round of sixteen in the UEFA Cup.

His European performance as well as domestic performance created interest from Dutch club Vitesse. He joined the Eredivisie side for the 2007–08 season, signing a deal until 2010. His contract was terminated by the club in August 2009.

Megrelashvili was without a club until January 2010 when he signed for Maccabi Petah Tikva.

On March 15, 2008, in the match against Twente, Megrelishvili was substituted after only six minutes into the game, after a number of defensive errors. Two weeks later, in the match against AZ, Megrelishvili was replaced after 16 minutes. On June 6, 2011, Megrelishvili signed for Maccabi Haifa on a two-year contract.

== Honours ==
Maccabi Haifa

- Israeli Premier League (2): 2004–05, 2005–06
- Toto Cup Al (1):2005–06

Maccabi Tel Aviv

- Toto Cup Al (1): 2008–09

Hapoel Haifa

- Israel State Cup (1): 2017–18
