= Samuel Scheimann =

Israeli footballer

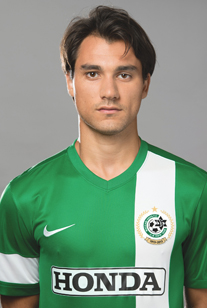
- Scheimann with Maccabi Haifa in 2013

Personal information
- Date of birth: 3 November 1987 (age 39)
- Place of birth: Afula, Israel
- Height: 1.81 m (5 ft 11 1/2 in)
- Position: Left back

Youth career
- 1993–2003: Feyenoord
- 2003–2006: NAC Breda

Senior career*
| Years | Team | Apps | (Gls) |
| 2006–2008 | Kozakken Boys | | |
| 2008–2011 | Den Bosch | 102 | (7) |
| 2011–2012 | Excelsior | 30 | (1) |
| 2012–2015 | Maccabi Haifa | 43 | (0) |
| 2015–2017 | Hapoel Tel Aviv | 25 | (1) |
| 2017–2018 | Hapoel Haifa | 42 | (0) |
| 2018 | Hapoel Be'er Sheva | 2 | (0) |
| 2018–2019 | Beitar Jerusalem | 27 | (0) |
| 2019–2020 | VVV-Venlo | 8 | (0) |
| 2020 | Ironi Kiryat Shmona | 7 | (0) |
| 2020–2021 | VV Katwijk | 5 | (1) |

International career^{‡}
| 2012–2018 | Israel | 2 | (0) |
- * Club domestic league appearances and goals as of 14:06, 17 November 2020 (UTC) ‡ National team caps and goals as of 17:12, 4 October 2019 (UTC)

Samuel Scheimann (Hebrew: שמואל שיימן; born 3 November 1987) is an Israeli former international footballer who played as a left back for Feyenoord, NAC Breda, Kozakken Boys, FC Den Bosch, Excelsior, Maccabi Haifa, Hapoel Haifa, Hapoel Tel Aviv and Beitar Jerusalem.

== Early life ==
Samuel Scheimann was born in Afula, Israel, to a Jewish family. He immigrated to the Netherlands with his family at the age of five.

== Club career ==
=== Feyenoord, NAC and a Maccabiah ===
Scheimann started playing football in the youth system of Feyenoord. In 2003, Scheimann joined the youth system of NAC Breda. At age 18, he represented the Netherlands at the 2005 Maccabiah Games in football.

=== Kozakken Boys and trials ===
Shortly thereafter, Scheimann was invited by Maccabi Tel Aviv for trials but did not receive a contract. Scheimann returned to the Netherlands and signed a two-year contract with Kozakken Boys. After an extensive trial at Jong AFC Ajax, coach Aron Winter wanted to sign Scheimann in 2008, but Martin van Geel vetoed the signing.

=== FC Den Bosch and Excelsior ===
On 11 April 2008, he signed with FC Den Bosch from Kozakken Boys after rejecting an offer from Feyenoord because he wanted first team action. Scheimann was voted 'Player of the Year' in his first season with Den Bosch. After the 2010–11 Eerste Divisie season ended, Scheimann left Den Bosch as a free agent.

He joined Eredivisie club Excelsior Rotterdam on a two-year contract until July 2013. Scheimann made his debut for Excelsior in a 2–0 loss against Feyenoord on 5 August 2011, playing 90 minutes.

=== Maccabi Haifa and Hapoel Tel Aviv ===
On 3 June 2012, he signed to Maccabi Haifa for two years, with an option for two more years. On 27 August 2012, he made his Israeli Premier League debut in a 1–2 loss against Maccabi Tel Aviv.

On 2 June 2015, he signed to Hapoel Tel Aviv for two years. In January 2017 he was released by Hapoel, following financial problems.

=== Hapoel Haifa and Beitar Jerusalem ===
On 12 January 2017, he signed to Hapoel Haifa for 1.5 years.

On 11 June 2018, he signed to Hapoel Be'er Sheva for two years. On 5 September 2018, Scheimann released from Be'er Sheva and signed to Beitar Jerusalem for two years.

=== VVV, Kiryat Shmona and Katwijk ===
In June 2019 he returned to the Netherlands with VVV-Venlo.

In January 2020 he signed for the Israeli team Hapoel Ironi Kiryat Shmona F.C. After playing 7 games in the team, he was released from contract in the end of the season.

In August 2020 he signed in the Dutch team VV Katwijk of the Tweede Divisie for a free transfer.

== International career ==
On 16 May 2012, Scheimann received his first call up to the Israel national team. He made his international debut later that year.
