= Nisso Kapiloto =

Israeli footballer

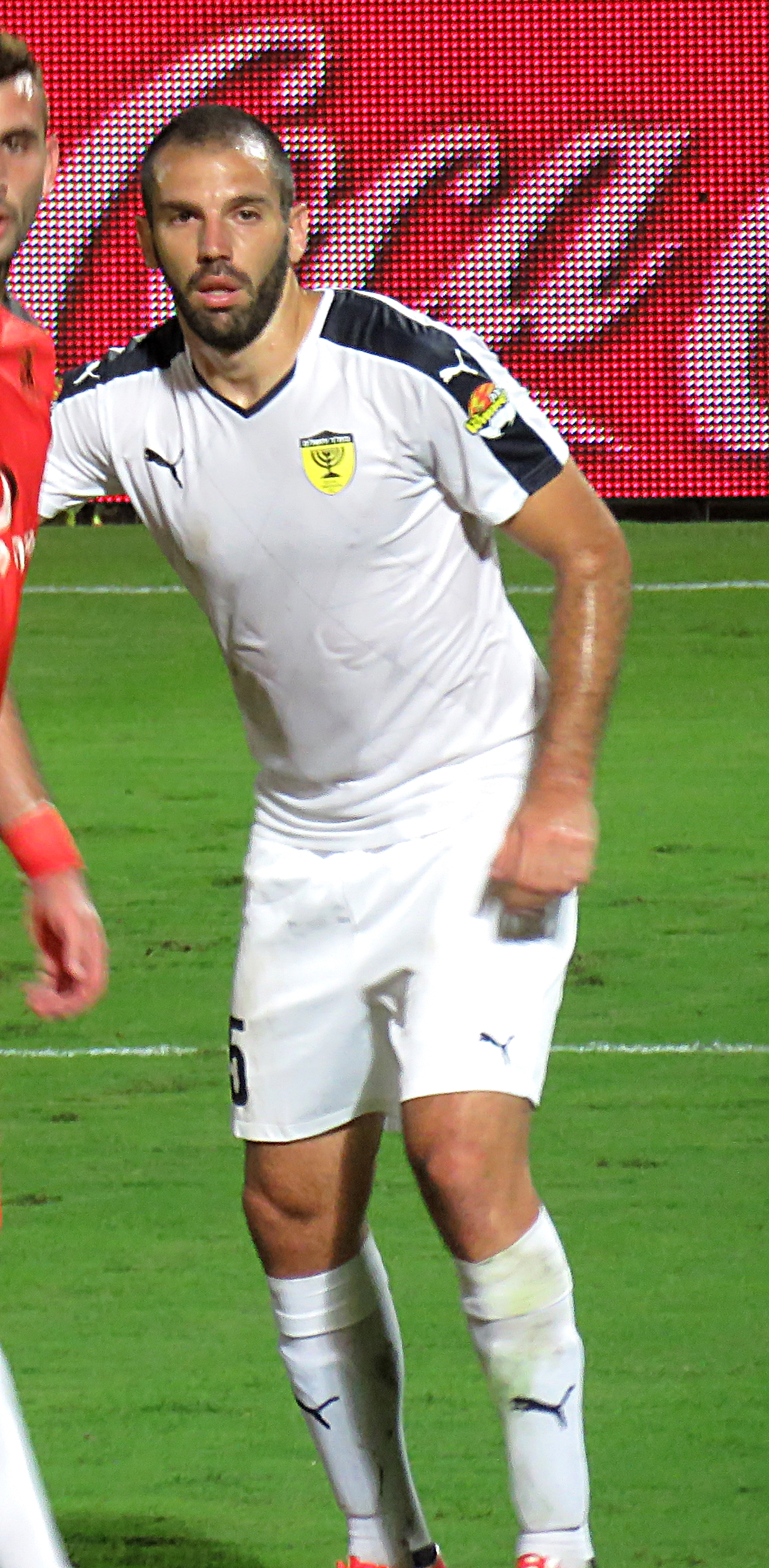
- Kapiloto playing for Beitar Jerusalem in 2015

Personal information
- Full name: Nissim Kapiloto
- Date of birth: 1 October 1989 (age 37)
- Place of birth: Bat Yam, Israel
- Height: 1.80 m (5 ft 11 in)
- Position: Centre-back

Youth career
- 2001–2009: Maccabi Tel Aviv

Senior career*
Years	Team	Apps	(Gls)
2006–2012	Maccabi Tel Aviv	30	(0)
2011	→ Ashdod (loan)	10	(1)
2011–2012	→ Hapoel Acre (loan)	29	(3)
2012–2013	Alki Larnaca	22	(1)
2013–2014	Beitar Jerusalem	27	(2)
2014–2015	St. Gallen	13	(0)
2015–2016	Beitar Jerusalem	15	(0)
2016–2023	Hapoel Haifa	149	(7)
2023–2024	Sektzia Ness Ziona	16	(0)

International career
2006	Israel U17	4	(0)
2008	Israel U18	3	(0)
2006–2008	Israel U19	27	(2)
2008–2011	Israel U21	2	(0)
2018	Israel	2	(0)
- * Club domestic league appearances and goals

Nissim "Nisso" Kapiloto (Hebrew: ניסים "ניסו" קפילוטו; born 1 October 1989) is a former Israeli professional footballer who plays as a centre-back.

== Club career ==
Kapiloto made his Senior debut in a match against Hakoah Amidar Ramat Gan on 12 December 2006 when he was only 17 years old. He made his UEFA Cup debut against Kayseri Erciyesspor, still before his 18th birthday.

== International career ==
On 7 September 2018, Kapiloto made his debut for the senior National team in a 1–0 loss against Albania.

== Honours ==
Hapoel Haifa

- Israel State Cup (1): 2017–18
- Israel Super Cup (1): 2018
