= Didier Kougbenya =

Togolese footballer

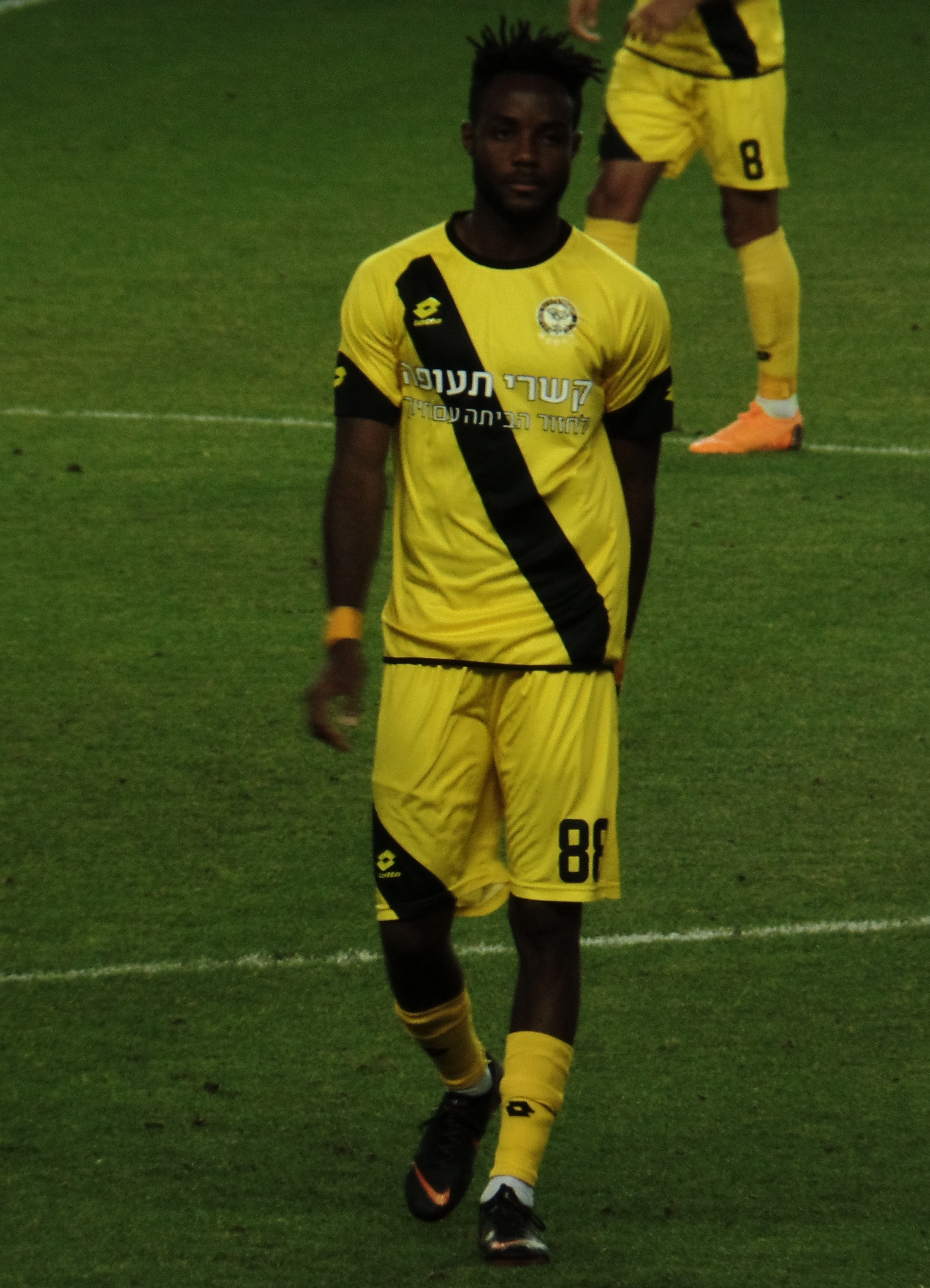

Personal information
- Full name: Didier Kougbenya
- Date of birth: November 12, 1995 (age 30)
- Place of birth: Kpalimé, Togo
- Position: Midfielder

Senior career*
Years	Team	Apps	(Gls)
2015	Beitar Tel Aviv Ramla	16	(8)
2015–2016	Ashdod	18	(0)
2016	Maccabi Kiryat Gat	13	(2)
2016–2019	Maccabi Netanya	76	(16)
2019	→ Dila Gori (loan)	11	(4)
2019–2020	Hapoel Hadera	20	(1)
2021–	Dila Gori	7	(0)

International career
2014–2015	Togo U-20	4	(2)
- * Club domestic league appearances and goals as of 11 July 2021

Didier Kougbenya is a Togolese footballer who last played for Dila GoriHe has also represented the Togo national U-20 team in 2014-2015.

== Honours ==
- Liga Leumit
  - Winner (1): 2016-17
