= Gal Arel =

Israeli footballer

Gal Arrel
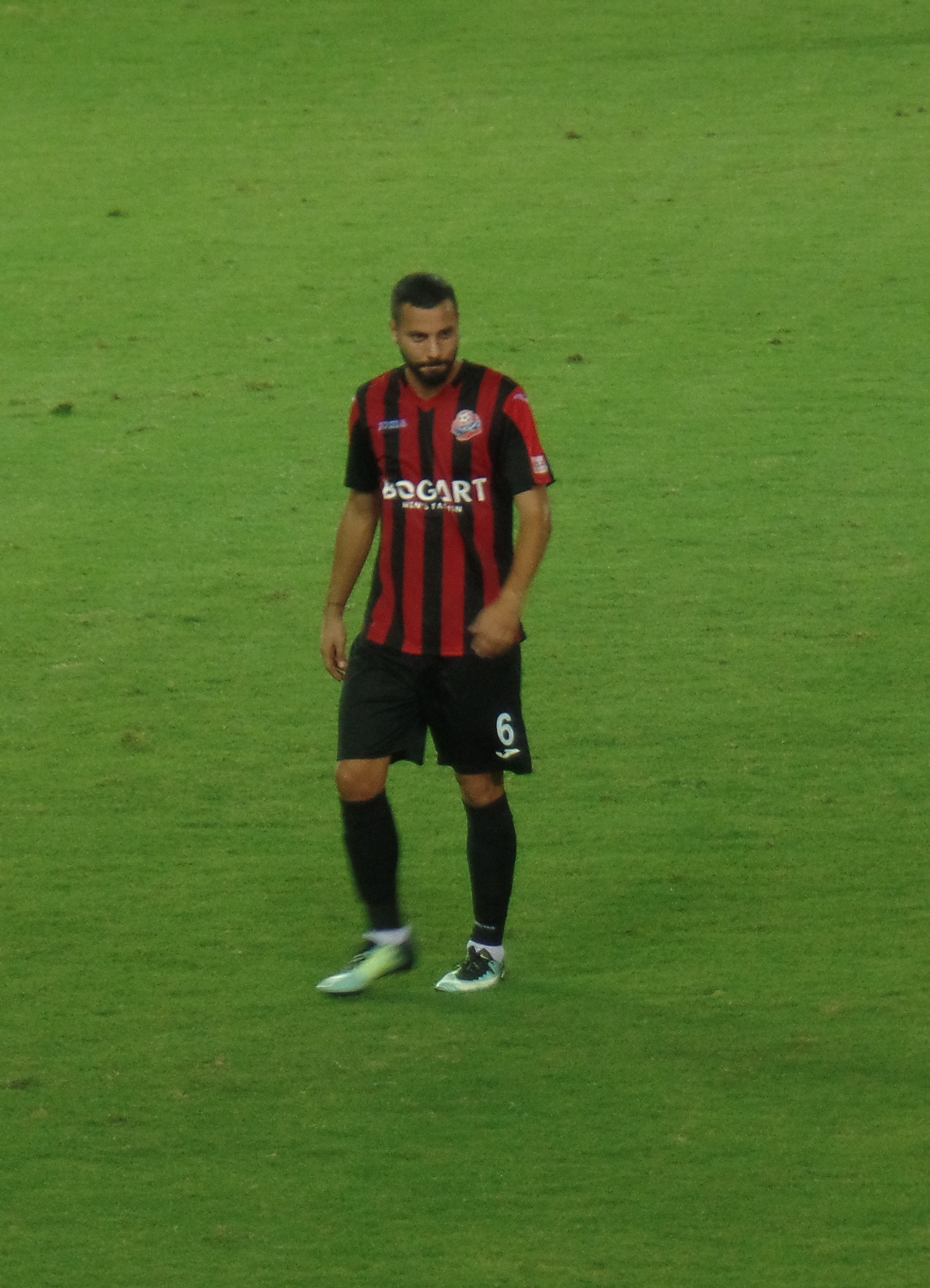
- Gal Arel in 2018.

Personal information
- Full name: Gal Arel
- Date of birth: 9 July 1989 (age 37)
- Place of birth: Haifa, Israel
- Height: 1.85 m (6 ft 1 in)
- Positions: Defensive midfielder; centre-back

Team information
- Current team: Hapoel Haifa (manager)

Youth career
- 2006–2009: Hapoel Haifa

Senior career*
Years	Team	Apps	(Gls)
2009–2013	Hapoel Haifa	107	(7)
2013–2015	Hapoel Be'er Sheva	45	(1)
2015	→ Hapoel Petah Tikva (loan)	11	(1)
2015–2016	Gimnàstic	4	(0)
2016	Zawisza Bydgoszcz	12	(1)
2016–2017	Hapoel Ra'anana	5	(0)
2017	Hapoel Acre	15	(0)
2017–2023	Hapoel Haifa	156	(22)

International career
2006	Israel U17	5	(0)
2006–2007	Israel U18	5	(0)
2008	Israel U21	1	(0)

Managerial career
- 2023–2025: Hapoel Haifa (assistant)
- 2025–: Hapoel Haifa
- * Club domestic league appearances and goals

Gal Arel (Hebrew: גל אראל; born 9 July 1989) is an Israeli former professional footballer who played as a defensive midfielder or a central defender. He is currently the coach of Hapoel Haifa.

== Club career ==
Arel was born in Kiryat Haim, Haifa. He finished his formation with Hapoel Haifa. On 23 January 2009 he made his senior debut, coming on as a late substitute in a 1–0 away win against Maccabi Ironi Kiryat Ata.

On 22 August 2009, Arel made his Premier League debut, again from the bench in a 2–1 success at Maccabi Netanya; he also scored the winner in the 80th minute. He was regularly used during the following four full seasons, with his side always avoiding relegation.

On 22 July 2013, Arel signed a four-year deal with fellow league team Hapoel Be'er Sheva. Regularly used during his first season, he lost his space in his second, being loaned to Hapoel Petah Tikva in January 2015.

On 1 August 2015, already as a free agent, Arel joined Gimnàstic de Tarragona, signing a two-year deal with the club after impressing on a trial. On 1 February of the following year, after being rarely used, he rescinded his link.

== Honours ==
Hapoel Haifa

- Liga Leumit: 2008–09
- Toto Cup: 2012–13
- Israel State Cup: 2017–18

Hapoel Be'er Sheva

- Israeli Premier League runner-up: 2013–14
