= Eden Ben Basat =

Israeli footballer (born 1986)

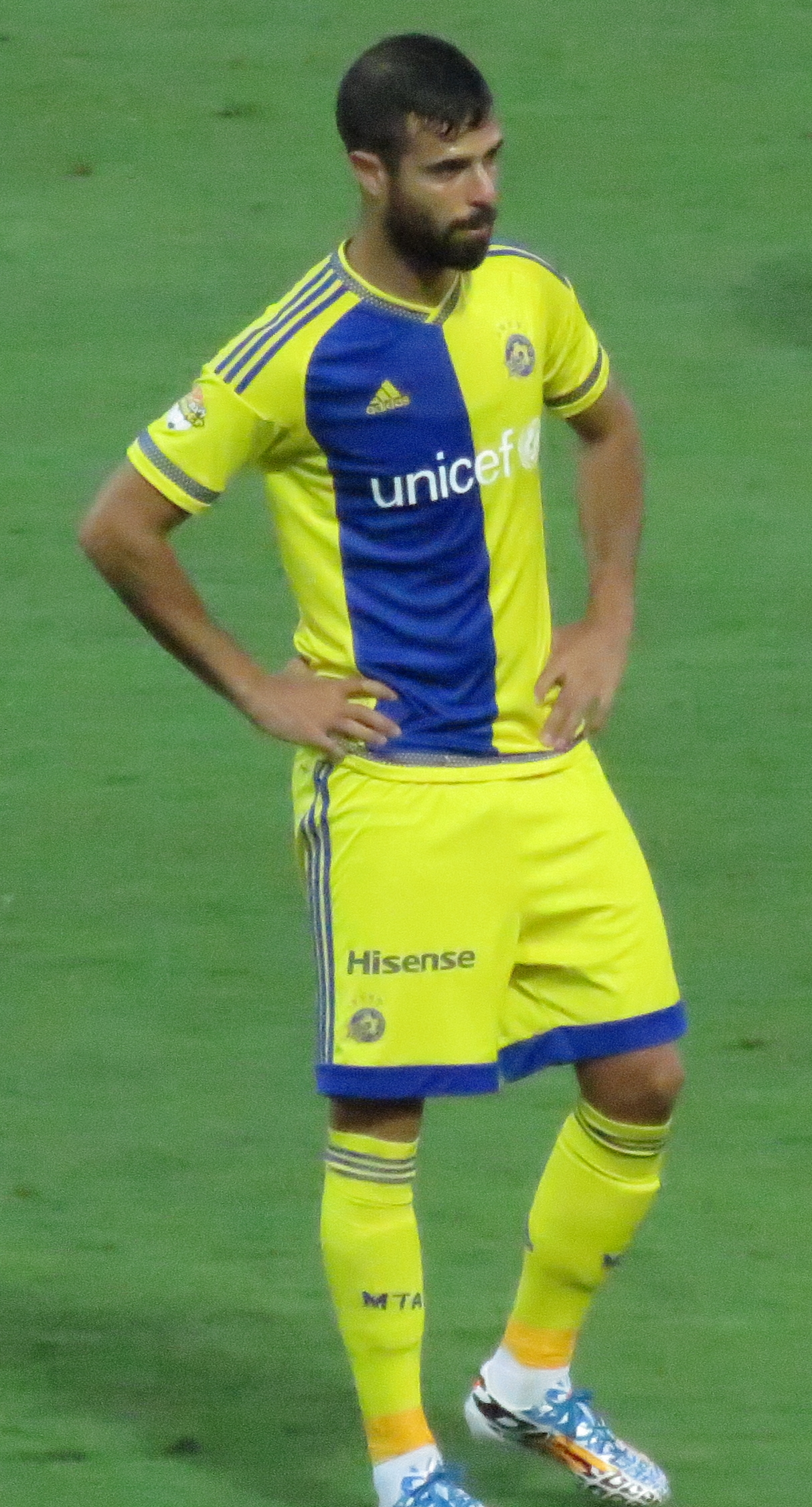
- Ben Basat playing for Maccabi Tel Aviv in 2015

Personal information
- Date of birth: 8 September 1986 (age 40)
- Place of birth: Kiryat Haim, Israel
- Height: 1.85 m (6 ft 1 in)
- Position: Striker

Team information
- Current team: Hapoel Haifa
- Number: 9

Youth career
- Hapoel Haifa
- Maccabi Haifa

Senior career*
Years	Team	Apps	(Gls)
2004–2009	Maccabi Haifa	21	(4)
2007	→ Maccabi Herzliya (loan)	9	(0)
2007–2008	→ Hapoel Haifa (loan)	26	(13)
2008	→ Ironi Kiryat Shmona (loan)	13	(2)
2009	→ Hapoel Tel Aviv (loan)	9	(1)
2009–2011	Hapoel Haifa	59	(27)
2011–2013	Brest	52	(13)
2013–2014	Toulouse	32	(7)
2014–2017	Maccabi Tel Aviv	57	(9)
2017–2018	Hapoel Haifa	43	(14)
2018–2019	Hapoel Be'er Sheva	16	(1)
2019–2021	Hapoel Haifa	38	(6)

International career^{‡}
2003	Israel U17	4	(0)
2004	Israel U18	3	(4)
2004–2005	Israel U19	10	(5)
2012–2021	Israel	13	(7)
- * Club domestic league appearances and goals as of 22 May 2021 ‡ National team caps and goals as of 25 June 2015

Eden Ben Basat (Hebrew: עדן בן בסט; born 8 September 1986) is a former Israeli professional footballer who played for the Israeli Premier League side Hapoel Haifa. At the international level, Ben Basat was capped from the under-17 level onward and is now a member of the Israeli national squad.

== Early life ==
Ben Basat was born in Kiryat Haim, Israel, to a Jewish family.

He is the nephew of the legendary defender Eitan Aharoni, who also played for Maccabi Haifa and Hapoel Haifa.

== Club career ==
Ben Basat grew up in the red side of Haifa, at Hapoel Haifa, but moved to the youth academy of Maccabi Haifa. In the U-16 team, he averaged more than 20 goals per season. Ben Basat played for every national team in Israel. Ronny Levy promoted him to the first team of Maccabi Haifa, and he made his first appearance on 19 December 2004 against Hapoel Nazareth Illit.

Ben Basat was the only Israeli selected to play an England Schools under-18 team with the Rest of the World Schools XI in a match to celebrate the 2004 centenary of the English Schools' Football Association. In this game he scored one of the goals.

At the end of the 2009–10 Israeli Premier League, Ben Basat negotiated the purchase of his player card with Maccabi Haifa. The negotiated fee settled upon was US$50,000.

=== Brest ===
At the end of the 2010–11 Israeli Premier League season, Ben Basat received a phone call to meet with Maccabi Haifa owner, Ya'akov Shahar. In that meeting, Shahar asked Ben Basat to return to Haifa in order to become a central part of the attack together with Tomer Hemed. Ben Basat politely declined and informed Shahar of his desire to try to play in Europe. In June 2011, Ben Basat announced that he had signed with French club, Stade Brestois 29. Ben Basat cited the club's seriousness in him as well as financial motivations for signing with the club.

Ahead of his move to France, Ben Basat acknowledged that it would be difficult. The language barrier as well as there being difficulties adhering to his kosher diet in France were some of the hardships he cited, but signing together with Colombian Jhon Culma meant that he would have someone who be understanding of his situation.

=== Toulouse ===
On 31 January 2013, Toulouse signed Ben Basat to a four-and-a-half-year deal from Brest for an undisclosed fee.

=== Maccabi Tel ===
On 22 July 2014, Maccabi Tel Aviv signed Ben Basat to a four-year deal, for €700,000. On 20 October 2014, he scored his debut goal for his team at the 3–1 win against Maccabi Haifa.

=== Hapoel Haifa ===
On 14 January 2018, Eden Ben Basat scored the first goal of the match for Hapoel Haifa against league champions Hapoel Be'er Sheva F.C., after no more than seven seconds, breaking an all-time Israeli Premier League record.

== International career ==
Ben Basat made his debut in the 2014 FIFA World Cup qualification campaign as a substitute against Russia in a 4–0 defeat, and scored his first goal against Luxembourg in his second appearance.

=== International goals ===
Scores and results list Israel's goal tally first, score column indicates score after each Ben Basat goal.

List of international goals scored by Eden Ben Basat
No.	Date	Venue	Opponent	Score	Result	Competition
1	12 October 2012	Stade Josy Barthel, City of Luxembourg, Luxembourg	Luxembourg	2–0	6–0	2014 FIFA World Cup qualification
2	16 October 2012	Ramat Gan Stadium, Ramat Gan, Israel	Luxembourg	2–0	3–0	2014 FIFA World Cup qualification
3	6 February 2013	Netanya Stadium, Netanya, Israel	Finland	1–0	2–1	Friendly
4	22 March 2013	Ramat Gan Stadium, Ramat Gan, Israel	Portugal	2–1	3–3	2014 FIFA World Cup qualification
5	26 March 2013	Windsor Park, Belfast, Northern Ireland	Northern Ireland	2–0	2–0	2014 FIFA World Cup qualification
6	11 October 2013	Estádio José Alvalade, Lisbon, Portugal	Portugal	1–1	1–1	2014 FIFA World Cup qualification
7	15 October 2013	Ramat Gan Stadium, Ramat Gan, Israel	Northern Ireland	1–0	1–1	2014 FIFA World Cup qualification

== Honours ==
Maccabi Haifa

- Israeli Championship: 2004–05, 2005–06

Maccabi Tel Aviv

- Israeli Premier League: 2014–15
- Israel State Cup: 2014-15
- Toto Cup: 2014–15

Hapoel Haifa

- Israel State Cup: 2017-18
