= Rasmus Sjöstedt =

Swedish footballer

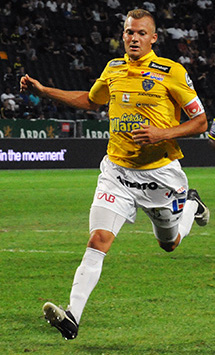

Personal information
- Full name: Rasmus Stellan Sjöstedt
- Date of birth: 28 February 1992 (age 34)
- Place of birth: Färjestaden, Sweden
- Height: 1.82 m (6 ft 0 in)
- Position: Centre-back

Team information
- Current team: Kalmar
- Number: 6

Youth career
- –2007: Färjestadens GoIF
- 2008–2011: Kalmar FF

Senior career*
Years	Team	Apps	(Gls)
2011–2015	Kalmar FF	11	(0)
2014	→ Falkenbergs FF (loan)	27	(0)
2015–2016	Falkenbergs FF	45	(1)
2017	Aris Limassol	13	(0)
2017–2019	Hapoel Haifa	50	(1)
2019–2020	Panetolikos	18	(0)
2020–	Kalmar	119	(1)

International career
2007	Sweden U17	1	(0)
2011	Sweden U19	1	(0)
- * Club domestic league appearances and goals as of 13 November 2025

Rasmus Sjöstedt (born 28 February 1992) is a Swedish professional footballer who plays as a centre-back for Kalmar FF.

== Honours ==
Hapoel Haifa

- Israel State Cup: 2017–18
