= Bruno Ibeh =

Nigerian footballer

Personal information
- Full name: Chibuzor Bruno Ibeh
- Date of birth: April 15, 1995 (age 31)
- Place of birth: Owerri, Nigeria
- Height: 1.90 m (6 ft 3 in)
- Position: Midfielder

Team information
- Current team: Taraz

Senior career*
Years	Team	Apps	(Gls)
2015–2017	Nacional	0	(0)
2015–2016	→ Torque (loan)	17	(0)
2017	→ Sud América (loan)	5	(0)
2017–2018	Hapoel Acre	30	(0)
2018–2019	Beitar Jerusalem	1	(0)
2019	Domžale	0	(0)
2021–	Taraz	0	(0)
- * Club domestic league appearances and goals as of 1 June 2021

Bruno Ibeh // (born April 15, 1995) is a Nigerian footballer who plays as a midfielder.

== Career ==
Ibeh joined Uruguayan side Nacional in 2014, where he played in the third division with the club's B team. At the beginning of the 2015–16 season, as Gustavo Munúa was appointed the club's new coach, Ibeh was called to train with the first team for the pre-season. On 6 October 2015, he was sent on a one-year loan to second division Club Atlético Torque.

After leaving Nacional, Ibeh joined Sud América, where he made five first division appearances. Having played sparingly during his time in Uruguay, Ibeh moved to Israel, where he played for Hapoel Acre F.C. and Beitar Jerusalem F.C.
