= 2022–23 Hapoel Haifa F.C. season =

Hapoel Haifa
2022–23 season
- Owner: Yoav Katz
- Chairman: Yoav Katz
- Manager: Nir Klinger (until 23 October 2022); Ronny Levy (from 24 October 2022)
- Stadium: Sammy Ofer
- Ligat Ha'Al: 7th
- State Cup: Round of 16
- Toto Cup: 14th
- Top goalscorer: League: Alon Turgeman (7); All: Alon Turgeman (7); Liran Serdal (7)
- Biggest win: 4–0 (vs Maccabi Bnei Reineh, 13 May 2023)
- Biggest defeat: 1–5 (vs Maccabi Haifa, 4 January 2023)
Home colours	Away colours	Third colours
- All statistics correct as of 18 December 2021.

Hapoel Haifa Football Club is an Israeli football club located in Haifa. During the 2022–23 campaign the club have competed in the Israeli Premier League, State Cup and Toto Cup.

== Club ==
=== Kits ===
- Provider: Diadora, Le Coq
- Main Sponsor: Leos Media
- Secondary Sponsor: Almog, Shorashim

Home	Away	3rd	GK 1	GK 2

== First team ==
No.	Pos.	Nation	Player
1	GK	(Israel) ISR	Ran Kadoch
4	DF	(Israel) ISR	Dor Malul (Vice-Captain)
5	DF	(Cyprus) CYP	Constantinos Soteriou
6	MF	(Israel) ISR	Gal Arel
7	MF	(Israel) ISR	Eliel Peretz
8	FW	(Haiti) HAI	Carnejy Antoine
9	MF	(Israel) ISR	Tomer Yosefi
10	FW	(Israel) ISR	Shoval Gozlan
11	MF	(Lithuania) LTU	Arvydas Novikovas
12	DF	(Israel) ISR	Oren Biton
13	DF	(Israel) ISR	Noam Ben Harush
14	DF	(Israel) ISR	Dudu Twito
15	MF	(Israel) ISR	Hanan Maman
16	FW	(Israel) ISR	Dudu Alterovich
17	FW	(Israel) ISR	Alon Turgeman

No.	Pos.	Nation	Player
18	MF	(Israel) ISR	Yarin Serdal
19	FW	(Liberia) LBR	Mohammed Kamara
20	DF	(Israel) ISR	Loai Taha
21	GK	(Israel) ISR	Ohad Levita
22	DF	(Israel) ISR	Guy Mizrahi
24	DF	(Israel) ISR	Liran Serdal
25	FW	(Israel) ISR	Gebair Bushnak
26	MF	(Israel) ISR	Gidi Kanyuk
28	MF	(Montenegro) MNE	Aleksandar Šćekić
29	FW	(Israel) ISR	Itay Buganim
33	DF	(Belarus) BLR	Denis Polyakov
44	DF	(Israel) ISR	Hatem Abd Elhamed
50	GK	(Israel) ISR	Amit Suiri
66	MF	(Israel) ISR	Tamir Glazer

== Transfers ==
=== Summer ===
In:

No.	Pos.	Nation	Player
—	GK	(Israel) ISR	Amit Suiri (loan return from Hapoel Acre)
—	MF	(Israel) ISR	Gidi Kanyuk (from (Thailand) Chonburi)
—	FW	(Israel) ISR	Shoval Gozlan (from Hapoel Hadera)
—	MF	(Israel) ISR	Amit Meir (from Maccabi Petah Tikva)
—	MF	(Israel) ISR	Tamir Glazer (on loan from Maccabi Tel Aviv)
—	DF	(Israel) ISR	Guy Mizrah (on loan from Maccabi Tel Aviv)
—	GK	(Israel) ISR	Ran Kadoch (from Bnei Yehuda Tel Aviv)
—	DF	(Israel) ISR	Hatem Abd Elhamed (on loan from Hapoel Be'er Sheva)
—	MF	(Israel) ISR	Eliel Peretz (from (Austria) Wolfsberger AC)
—	DF	(Israel) ISR	Oren Biton (from Beitar Jerusalem)
—	DF	(Ukraine) UKR	Illya Markovskyi (from (Greece) Rodos)
—	MF	(Moldova) MDA	Nichita Moțpan (on loan from (Moldova) Bălți)
—	MF	(Portugal) POR	Leandro Silva (from (Portugal) Arouca)
—	DF	(Croatia) CRO	Dino Štiglec (from (Poland) Śląsk Wrocław)
—	DF	(Romania) ROU	Andrei Miron (from (Romania) FCSB)
—	MF	(Sierra Leone) SLE	Kwame Quee (from (Saudi Arabia) Najran SC)
—	DF	(Cyprus) CYP	Constantinos Soteriou (on loan from (Cyprus) AEL Limassol)
—	FW	(Liberia) LBR	Mohammed Kamara (from (Turkey) Hatayspor)

Out:

No.	Pos.	Nation	Player
—	GK	(Israel) ISR	Tal Bomshtein (to Hapoel Umm al-Fahm)
—	DF	(Israel) ISR	Guy Mishpati (to Maccabi Jaffa)
—	DF	(Israel) ISR	Ali Kayal (to Hapoel Ramat Gan)
—	MF	(Israel) ISR	Sa'ar Fadida (to Hapoel Hadera)
—	MF	(Israel) ISR	Ness Zamir (to Sektzia Ness Ziona)
—	MF	(Israel) ISR	Snir Talias (on loan to Ironi Tiberias)
—	MF	(Israel) ISR	Yarin Gavri (on loan to Maccabi Ahi Nazareth)
—	FW	(Israel) ISR	Dudu Alterovich (on loan to Hapoel Nof HaGalil)
—	DF	(Nigeria) NGA	Izuchuckwu Anthony (Free agent)
—	MF	(Serbia) SRB	Matija Ljujić (to (Hungary) Újpest)
—	MF	(The Gambia) GAM	Saikou Touray (to (France) Grenoble, previously loaned from Maccabi Haifa)
—	FW	(Slovenia) SVN	Alen Ožbolt (to Hapoel Tel Aviv, previously loaned from (Slovakia) Slovan Bratislava)
—	DF	(Ukraine) UKR	Illya Markovskyi (Free agent)
—	DF	(Romania) ROU	Andrei Miron (Free agent)
—	MF	(Portugal) POR	Leandro Silva (Free agent)

=== Winter ===
In:

No.	Pos.	Nation	Player
—	DF	(Belarus) BLR	Denis Polyakov (from (Kazakhstan) Astana)
—	MF	(Israel) ISR	Tomer Yosefi (on loan from Hapoel Be'er Sheva)
—	MF	(Montenegro) MNE	Aleksandar Šćekić (from (United Arab Emirates) Dibba Al Fujairah)
—	MF	(Lithuania) LTU	Arvydas Novikovas (from (Turkey) Samsunspor)
—	FW	(Haiti) HAI	Carnejy Antoine (from (Portugal) Casa Pia)
—	FW	(Israel) ISR	Dudu Alterovich (loan return from Hapoel Nof HaGalil)

Out:

No.	Pos.	Nation	Player
—	MF	(Moldova) MDA	Nichita Moțpan (loan return to (Moldova) Bălți)
—	MF	(Israel) ISR	Amit Meir (on loan to Maccabi Bnei Reineh)
—	FW	(Israel) ISR	Rauf Jabarin (on loan to Hapoel Nof HaGalil)
—	DF	(Croatia) CRO	Dino Štiglec (Free agent)
—	MF	(Sierra Leone) SLE	Kwame Quee (Free agent)
—	DF	(Israel) ISR	Nisso Kapiloto (to Sektzia Ness Ziona)

== Pre-season and friendlies ==
Win Draw Loss

12 July 2022	Hapoel Acre	0–0	Hapoel Haifa	Acre
17:30		Report		Stadium: Acre Municipal Stadium

12 July 2022	Hapoel Haifa	1–0	Hapoel Umm al-Fahm	Nahariya
17:30	Kanyuk 58'	Report		Stadium: Nahariya field

18 July 2022 Training Camp	Hapoel Haifa (Israel)	1–0	(Cyprus) Omonia	Nicosia, Cyprus
20:00	Turgeman 30'	Report		Stadium: GSP

20 July 2022 Training Camp	Hapoel Haifa (Israel)	1–1	(Cyprus) Enosis Neon Paralimni	Paralimni, Cyprus
19:00	Gozlan 39'	Report	40'	Stadium: Paralimni

23 July 2022 Training Camp	Hapoel Haifa (Israel)	0–3	(Cyprus) Karmiotissa	Paphos, Cyprus
19:30		Report	8'; 33'; 40'	Stadium: Stelios Kyriakides

22 September 2022	Hapoel Haifa	0–1	Maccabi Bnei Reineh	Haifa
10:30	Azulay 85'	Report		Stadium: Beit Nagler

28 November 2022	Hapoel Afula	0–4	Hapoel Haifa	Afula
13:00		Report	Turgeman 25'; Kanyuk 35'; Soteriou 42'; Kamara 75' (pen.)	Stadium: Afula training ground

29 March 2023	Hapoel Acre	0–2	Hapoel Haifa	Acre
10:00		Report	Turgeman 35'; Arel 65' (pen.)	Stadium: Acre

== Competitions ==
=== Overview ===
Competition	First match	Last match	Starting round	Final position	Record							
Competition	First match	Last match	Starting round	Final position	Pld	W	D	L	GF	GA	GD	Win %
Ligat Ha'Al	20 August 2022	13 May 2023	Matchday 1	7th	33	9	14	10	35	35	+0	27.27
State Cup	12 December 2022	4 January 2023	Eighth Round	Round Of 16	2	0	1	1	5	9	−4	0.00
Toto Cup	31 July 2022	7 December 2022	Group stage	14th	5	0	1	4	6	13	−7	0.00
Total					40	9	16	15	46	57	−11	22.50

Last updated: 14 July 2020.
Source: Competitions

== Ligat Ha'Al ==
=== Regular season ===
Pos	Team	Pld	W	D	L	GF	GA	GD	Pts	Qualification or relegation
6	Ashdod	26	9	9	8	32	30	+2	36	Qualification for the Championship round
7	Beitar Jerusalem	26	9	4	13	38	47	−9	31	Transfer to the Relegation round
8	Hapoel Haifa	26	6	12	8	25	28	−3	30	Transfer to the Relegation round
9	Bnei Sakhnin	26	7	9	10	26	30	−4	30	Transfer to the Relegation round
10	Hapoel Hadera	26	6	11	9	26	41	−15	29	Transfer to the Relegation round

Source: Soccerway
Rules for classification: 1) Points; 2) Goal difference; 3) Matches won; 4) Goals scored; 5) Head-to-head points; 6) Head-to-head goal difference; 7) Head-to-head goals scored; 8) Play-off.

==== Results summary ====
Overall								Home						Away					
Pld	W	D	L	GF	GA	GD	Pts	W	D	L	GF	GA	GD	W	D	L	GF	GA	GD
33	9	14	10	35	35	0	41	5	7	5	14	12	+2	4	7	5	21	23	−2

Last updated: 7 March 2022.

==== Results by matchday ====
Away
Home
Win
Draw
Loss
Qualification for the Championship round & 1st place
Qualification for the Championship round & 2nd place
Qualification for the Championship round & 3rd place
Qualification for the Championship round
Transfer to the Relegation round

Matchday	1	2	3	4	5	6	7	8	9	10	11	12	13	14	15	16	17	18	19	20	21	22	23	24	25	26	27	28	29	30	31	32	33
Ground	H	A	H	A	H	A	H	A	H	A	H	H	A	A	H	A	H	A	H	A	H	A	H	A	A	H	H	A	H	H	A	H	A
Result	W	D	L	D	D	D	D	L	L	D	W	L	L	D	D	W	W	L	W	L	D	W	D	D	L	D	D	L	W	D	W	L	W
Position	3	4	6	7	7	7	9	10	11	11	8	10	12	11	12	8	5	8	7	9	9	7	8	8	8	8	8	9	8	9	8	8	7

Updated to match(es) played on 7 March 2022. Source:

==== Matches ====
Win Draw Loss

20 August 2022 Match 1	Hapoel Haifa	2–0	Hapoel Tel Aviv	Haifa
18:00	Twito 25' (yellow card) 45'; Gozlan 90+5'	Report	Roemeratoe (yellow card) 55'; Gotlieb (yellow card) 72'; Bitton (yellow card) 90+2'	Stadium: Sammy Ofer; Attendance: 7,450; Referee: Orel Grinfeld

28 August 2022 Match 2	Maccabi Bnei Reineh	1–1	Hapoel Haifa	Nof HaGalil
19:15	Spendlhofer (yellow card) 36'; Sambinha (yellow card) 61'; Abed (yellow card) 74'; Boateng 63'	Report	Mizrahi (yellow card) 10'; Maman 63' (pen.)	Stadium: Green; Attendance: 1,500; Referee: Shalom Ben Avraham

3 September 2022 Match 3	Hapoel Haifa	1–2	Bnei Sakhnin	Haifa
20:00	Maman (yellow card) 11'; Glazer (red card) 42'; Soteriou (yellow card) 70'; Gozlan 74'	Report	Kabha (yellow card) 11'; Kayal 63' (yellow card) 89'; Kayal (penalty missed) 94+5; Melamed 90+5'	Stadium: Sammy Ofer; Attendance: 3,100; Referee: Aviad Shiloach

10 September 2022 Match 4	Hapoel Hadera	1–1	Hapoel Haifa	Netanya
19:30	Alfred 56'; Ipole (yellow card) 62'; Šturm (yellow card) 77'; Avramov (yellow card) 88'	Report	Miron (yellow card) 32'; Serdal 77'	Stadium: Netanya; Attendance: 989; Referee: Na'al Oda

17 September 2022 Match 5	Hapoel Haifa	0–0	Maccabi Netanya	Haifa
20:00	Keller (yellow card) 7'; Shlomo (yellow card) 67'; Twumasi (yellow card) 81'	Report	Glazer (yellow card) 12'; Maman (yellow card) 45'; Gozlan (yellow card) 78'	Stadium: Sammy Ofer; Attendance: 2,750; Referee: Igal Frid

1 October 2022 Match 6	Hapoel Ironi Kiryat Shmona	1–1	Hapoel Haifa	Kiryat Shmona
18:00	Morgan (yellow card) 60'; Habshi 83' (pen.) (yellow card) 6' (yellow-red card) 90+5'; Shaker (yellow card) 90+3'	Report	Turgeman 17'; Štiglec (yellow card) 42'; Malul (yellow card) 60'	Stadium: Kiryat Shmona Municipal; Attendance: 2,048; Referee: David Fuxman

10 October 2022 Match 7	Hapoel Be'er Sheva	2–2	Hapoel Haifa	Be'er Sheva
20:00	Lopes 37' (pen.); Vítor (yellow card) 60'; Hatuel 76'	Report	Elhamed 26' (yellow card) 49'; Kamara (yellow card) 29'; Glazer (yellow card) 35'; Turgeman 55'; Malul (yellow card) 72'	Stadium: Turner; Attendance: 12,693; Referee: Aviad Shiloach

15 October 2022 Match 8	F.C. Ashdod	4–0	Hapoel Haifa	Ashdod
19:00	Sabag (yellow card) 18'; Kna'ani 38' (pen.); Mugees 44'; Mamatah 62'; Alabi 80'	Report	Serdal (yellow card) 2' (yellow-red card) 25'; Malul (yellow card) 35'; Glazer (yellow card) 49'; Gozlan (yellow card) 81'	Stadium: Yud-Alef; Attendance: 1,112; Referee: Eitan Shmuelevich

22 October 2022 Match 9	Hapoel Haifa	0–1	Sektzia Ness Ziona	Haifa
18:45	Kamara (yellow card) 3'; Taha (yellow card) 90'	Report	Kochav (yellow card) 13'; Stoyanov (yellow card) 44'; Kutalia (yellow card) 53'; Moura 82'	Stadium: Sammy Ofer; Attendance: 1980; Referee: Erez Papir

29 October 2022 Match 10	Beitar Jerusalem	0–0	Hapoel Haifa	Jerusalem
20:15	Kriaf (yellow card) 21'; Dgani (yellow card) 31'; Mejías (yellow card) 76'	Report	Quee (yellow card) 31' (red card) 74'; Glazer (red card) 33'; Maman (yellow card) 34'; Elhamed (yellow card) 34'; Taha (yellow card) 37'; Levita (yellow card) 78'	Stadium: Teddy; Attendance: 11,000; Referee: Niv Shtaif

5 November 2022 Match 11	Hapoel Haifa	1–0	Hapoel Jerusalem	Haifa
18:00	Kanyuk (yellow card) 44'; Turgeman 48'; Elhamed (yellow card) 83'; Buganim (yellow card) 85'; Maman (yellow card) 86'	Report	Bitton (yellow card) 53'	Stadium: Sammy Ofer; Attendance: 4,450; Referee: Roi Reinshreiber

9 November 2022 Match 12	Hapoel Haifa	0–1	Maccabi Haifa	Haifa
20:30	Elhamed (red card) 90+5'	Report	Cornud (yellow card) 39'; Elhamed 59' (o.g.); Goldberg (yellow card) 64'	Stadium: Sammy Ofer; Attendance: 26,000; Referee: Idan Leiba

12 November 2022 Match 13	Maccabi Tel Aviv	1–0	Hapoel Haifa	Tel Aviv
19:30	Jovanović 90+8'	Report	Meir (yellow card) 52'; Serdal (yellow card) 56'; Kamara (yellow card) 81'; Štiglec (yellow card) 86'	Stadium: Bloomfield; Attendance: 20,829; Referee: Na'al Oda

17 December 2022 Match 14	Hapoel Tel Aviv	3–3	Hapoel Haifa	Tel Aviv
15:00	Keltjens (yellow card) 31'; Ožbolt 59'; Israelov 78'; Zrihan 84'	Report	Peretz 12'; Arel 45+3' (pen.); Turgeman 71'; Soteriou (yellow card) 90'	Stadium: Bloomfield; Attendance: 0 Referee: Shalom Ben Avraham

24 December 2022 Match 15	Hapoel Haifa	0–0	Maccabi Bnei Reineh	Haifa
18:00	Peretz (red card) 15'; Arel (yellow card) 19'; Kamara (yellow card) 62'; Malul (yellow card) 68'; Serdal (yellow card) 89'; Taha (yellow card) 90+4'	Report	Hutba (yellow card) 45+3'; Yanko (yellow card) 45+5'; Rabah (yellow card) 45+7'; Sambinha (yellow card) 88'; Shalata (yellow card) 90'; Zenati (yellow card) 90+8'	Stadium: Sammy Ofer; Attendance: 2,300; Referee: Gal Levi

31 December 2022 Match 16	Bnei Sakhnin	1–2	Hapoel Haifa	Sakhnin
18:00	Melamed 68'; Conté (yellow card) 75'; Puljić (yellow card) 76'	Report	Maman (yellow card) 10'; Serdal 36'; Soteriou (yellow card) 50' (yellow-red card) 85'; Arel 76' (pen.)	Stadium: Doha; Attendance: 1,500; Referee: Orel Grinfeld

7 January 2023 Match 17	Hapoel Haifa	3–0	Hapoel Hadera	Haifa
18:00	Buganim (yellow card) 8'; Glazer (yellow card) 12'; Kanyuk (penalty missed) 24 24'; Peretz (yellow card) 37'; Yosefi 72'; Serdal 75'	Report	Boshnak (yellow card) 26'; Bourard (penalty missed) 90+5	Stadium: Sammy Ofer; Attendance: 1,780; Referee: Igal Frid

14 January 2023 Match 18	Maccabi Netanya	0–1	Hapoel Haifa	Netanya
19:00	Rotman 14'; Konstantini (yellow card) 39'; Kartsev (yellow card) 53'	Report	Kanyuk (yellow card) 36'; Glazer (yellow card) 52'; Kamara (yellow card) 70'	Stadium: Netanya; Attendance: 4,076; Referee: Niv Shtaif

21 January 2023 Match 19	Hapoel Haifa	1–0	Hapoel Ironi Kiryat Shmona	Haifa
17:30	Soteriou (yellow card) 39'; Peretz (yellow card) 39'; Maman (yellow card) 77'; Mizrahi 90+2'	Report	Adi (yellow card) 64'; Lugasi (yellow card) 68'	Stadium: Sammy Ofer; Attendance: 2,250

29 January 2023 Match 20	Hapoel Haifa	0–1	Hapoel Be'er Sheva	Haifa
20:15	Peretz (yellow card) 64'; Turgeman (yellow card) 77'; Mizrahi (yellow card) 80'	Report	Ansah 1' (yellow card) 55'; Elias (yellow card) 24'; Yehezkel (yellow card) 30'; Shamir (yellow card) 57'; Lopes (yellow card) 66'	Stadium: Sammy Ofer; Attendance: 3,370; Referee: Naal Odah

4 February 2023 Match 21	Hapoel Haifa	1–1	F.C. Ashdod	Haifa
18:00	Maman 51'; Peretz (yellow card) 68'; Glazer (yellow card) 89'; Mizrahi (yellow card) 90'	Report	Kna'an 61'; Cohen (yellow card) 67'	Stadium: Sammy Ofer; Attendance: 2,250; Referee: Eitan Shmuelevich

11 February 2023 Match 22	Sektzia Ness Ziona	0–2	Hapoel Haifa	Petah Tikva
18:00	Acka (yellow card) 15'	Report	Soteriou 38'; Šćekić (yellow card) 48'; Kamara 67'	Stadium: HaMoshava; Attendance: 716; Referee: Dekel Tzino

19 February 2023 Match 23	Hapoel Haifa	0–0	Beitar Jerusalem	Haifa
20:15	Šćekić (yellow card) 40'; Maman (yellow card) 52'; Soteriou (yellow card) 75'; Serdal (yellow card) 77'	Report	Adi (yellow card) 6'; Dahan (yellow card) 13'; Borodin (yellow card) 65'; Cohen (yellow card) 86'; Asprilla (yellow card) 90+3'	Stadium: Sammy Ofer; Attendance: 10,342; Referee: Orel Grinfeld

26 February 2023 Match 24	Hapoel Jerusalem	2–2	Hapoel Haifa	Jerusalem
20:15	Bitton 22'; Badash (yellow card) 50' (goal) 64' (pen.)	Report	Šćekić 38' (yellow card) 68'; Elhamed (yellow card) 63'; Mizrahi (yellow card) 82'; Kamara 88' (yellow card) 90+5'	Stadium: Teddy; Attendance: 1,754; Referee: Igal Frid

6 March 2023 Match 25	Maccabi Haifa	4–1	Hapoel Haifa	Haifa
20:30	Atzili 3', 5', 72'; Sundgren (yellow card) 33'; Chery 56'; Cohen (yellow card) 69'	Report	Twito (yellow card) 33'; Serdal (yellow card) 40' (goal) 68'; Malul (yellow card) 69'; Kamara (yellow card) 70'; Maman (yellow card) 88'	Stadium: Sammy Ofer; Attendance: 29,105; Referee: Snir Levi

11 March 2023 Match 26	Hapoel Haifa	1–1	Maccabi Tel Aviv	Haifa
15:00	Kamara (yellow card) 41'; Serdal (yellow card) 44'; Peretz 64'; Soteriou (yellow card) 73'	Report	Bitton 33' (red card) 57'; Kandil (yellow card) 84'; Saborit (yellow card) 90+4'	Stadium: Sammy Ofer; Attendance: 5,610; Referee: Aviad Shiloach

==== Results overview ====
Win Draw Loss

Opposition	Home score	Away score
Beitar Jerusalem	0–0	0–0
Bnei Sakhnin	1–2	2–1
F.C. Ashdod	1–1	0–4
Hapoel Be'er Sheva	0–1	2–2
Hapoel Hadera	3–0	1–1
Hapoel Ironi Kiryat Shmona	1–0	1–1
Hapoel Jerusalem	1–0	2–2
Hapoel Tel Aviv	2–0	3–3
Maccabi Bnei Reineh	0–0	1–1
Maccabi Haifa	0–1	1–4
Maccabi Netanya	0–0	0–1
Maccabi Tel Aviv	1–1	0–1
Sektzia Ness Ziona	0–1	2–0

=== Play-off ===
19 March 2023 Match 27	Hapoel Haifa	1–1	Hapoel Ironi Kiryat Shmona	Haifa
20:15	Kamara 46'; Mizrahi (yellow card) 60+6'	Report	Mizrahi 60' (o.g.); Morgan (yellow card) 79'	Stadium: Sammy Ofer; Attendance: 779; Referee: David Fuxman

3 April 2023 Match 28	Beitar Jerusalem	2–0	Hapoel Haifa	Jerusalem
20:15	Kriaf (yellow card) 39'; Thomas 45+1'; Dahan (yellow card) 87'; Yona 90'	Report	Yosefi (yellow card) 45+5'; Kamara (yellow card) 76'; Biton (yellow card) 89'; Taha (yellow card) 90'	Stadium: Teddy; Attendance: 5,400; Referee: Yoav Mizrahi

15 April 2023 Match 29	Hapoel Haifa	1–0	Hapoel Tel Aviv	Haifa
16:00	Turgeman 5'; Arel (yellow card) 45'	Report		Stadium: Sammy Ofer; Attendance: 3,950; Referee: Gal Levi

22 April 2023 Match 30	Hapoel Haifa	2–2	Bnei Sakhnin	Haifa
20:00	Turgeman 17', 74'; Šćekić (yellow card) 90'	Report	Bdarney (yellow card) 33'; Shukrani (yellow card) 64' (yellow-red card) 67'; Ghanayem (yellow card) 72'; Khoury 80'; Awaed 90+3'	Stadium: Sammy Ofer; Attendance: 1,850; Referee: Magad Rushrush

30 April 2023 Match 31	Hapoel Hadera	1–2	Hapoel Haifa	Netanya
19:00	Lababidi (yellow card) 22'; Alfred 41'	Report	Soteriou 12' (yellow card) 67'; Yosefi (yellow card) 37' (goal) 78' (pen.); Peretz (yellow card) 72'	Stadium: Netanya; Attendance: 1,113; Referee: Dekel Tzino

6 May 2023 Match 32	Hapoel Haifa	0–1	Sektzia Ness Ziona	Haifa
16:30	Maman (penalty missed) 45; Arel (yellow card) 90+1'; Peretz (yellow card) 90+2'	Report	Buzaglo 85'	Stadium: Sammy Ofer; Attendance: 2,066; Referee: Refael Geva

13 May 2023 Match 33	Maccabi Bnei Reineh	0–4	Hapoel Haifa	Nof HaGalil
19:00	Sambinha (yellow card) 43'; Hutba (yellow card) 79'	Report	Kamara 6', 59'; Arel (yellow card) 52'; Sambinha 56' (o.g.); Malul 79' (pen.)	Stadium: Green; Attendance: 1,500; Referee: Yoav Mizrahi

==== Relegation round table ====
Pos	Team	Pld	W	D	L	GF	GA	GD	Pts	Relegation	HHA	BEI	BnS	HTA	MBR	HAH	IKS	SNZ
7	Hapoel Haifa	33	9	14	10	35	35	0	41				2–2	1–0			1–1	0–1
8	Beitar Jerusalem	33	13	4	16	52	58	−6	40 (Note: Beitar Jerusalem had 3 points deducted.)	Qualification for the Europa Conference League second qualifying round (Note: Beitar Jerusalem qualified for the Europa Conference League second qualifying round as the 2022–23 Israel State Cup winners.)	2–0			2–1	0–1	2–1		
9	Bnei Sakhnin	33	8	13	12	39	44	−5	37			4–3		0–1	2–2	2–3		
10	Hapoel Tel Aviv	33	9	10	14	37	51	−14	36 (Note: Hapoel Tel Aviv had 1 point deducted.)						1–2		2–2	2–1
11	Maccabi Bnei Reineh	33	8	11	14	32	54	−22	35		0–4					1–1	1–3	
12	Hapoel Hadera	33	7	13	13	35	53	−18	34		1–2			1–2			1–1	1–2
13	Ironi Kiryat Shmona (R)	33	5	17	11	40	49	−9	32	Relegation to Liga Leumit		3–2	2–2					1–1
14	Sektzia Ness Ziona (R)	33	5	10	18	31	56	−25	25	Relegation to Liga Leumit		1–3	1–1		1–2			

Source: Soccerway
Rules for classification: 1) Points; 2) Goal difference; 3) Matches won; 4) Goals scored; 5) Head-to-head points; 6) Head-to-head goal difference; 7) Head-to-head goals scored; 8) Play-off.
(R) Relegated

==== Results overview ====
Win Draw Loss

Opposition	Home score	Away score
Beitar Jerusalem		0–2
Bnei Sakhnin	2–2	
Hapoel Hadera		2–1
Hapoel Ironi Kiryat Shmona	1–1	
Hapoel Tel Aviv	1–0	
Maccabi Bnei Reineh		4–0
Sektzia Ness Ziona	0–1	

== State Cup ==
=== Round of 32 ===
12 December 2022 Round of 32	Ihud Bnei Shefa-'Amr	4–4 (2–4 p)	Hapoel Haifa	Shefa-'Amr
13:00	Armeli (yellow card) 34'; Morjan 45+1'; Serdal 50' (o.g.); Abu Ayash (yellow card) 60'; Fukra 81', 89' (yellow card) 90+1'; El-Khatib (yellow card) 84'; Marisat (yellow card) 108'	Report	Quee 12'; Serdal 24', 30', 67'; Buganim (yellow card) 90+5'	Stadium: Shefa-'Amr Stadium; Attendance: 600; Referee: Refael Geva
	Penalties
	Marisat (penalty scored); Levi (penalty scored); Bar (penalty missed); Fukra (penalty missed)		(penalty scored) Arel; (penalty scored) Soteriou; (penalty scored) Taha; (penalty scored) Kanyuk

=== Round of 16 ===
4 January 2023 Round of 16	Maccabi Haifa	5–1	Hapoel Haifa	Haifa
20:30	Lavi 8'; Tchibota 19' (yellow card) 62'; Seck 77'; Atzili 78'; David 88'	Report	Arel (red card) 23'; Quee (yellow card) 45+5'; Twito (yellow card) 51'; Buganim 60'; Serdal (yellow card) 90+1'	Stadium: Sammy Ofer; Attendance: 28,343; Referee: Gal Leibovich

== Toto Cup ==
=== Group stage ===
Pos	Team	Pld	W	D	L	GF	GA	GD	Pts	Qualification	HHD	BnS	IKS	MBR	HHA
1	Hapoel Hadera	4	4	0	0	7	2	+5	12	Semi-finals			1–0	1–0	
2	Bnei Sakhnin	4	2	1	1	7	5	+2	7	5–8th classification play-offs	1–2			2–1	
3	Ironi Kiryat Shmona	4	1	2	1	4	4	0	5	9–10th classification play-offs		2–2			0–0
4	Maccabi Bnei Reineh	4	1	0	3	5	6	−1	3	11–12th classification play-offs			1–2		3–1
5	Hapoel Haifa	4	0	1	3	2	8	−6	1	13–14th classification play-offs	1–3	0–2			

Source: Israel Football Association, One.co.il
Rules for classification: 1) points; 2) goal difference; 3) number of wins; 4) goals scored; 5) head to head; 6)higher position in the last season.

31 July 2022 Match 1	Hapoel Haifa	0–2	Bnei Sakhnin	Haifa
20:00	Meir (yellow card) 26'; Malul (yellow card) 50'; Revinovich (yellow card) 75'; Arel (yellow card) 88'	Report	Hilo 13'; Sporkslede (yellow card) 22'; Melamed 55'; Taha (yellow card) 84'; Ghanayem (yellow card) 88'	Stadium: Sammy Ofer; Attendance: 1,600; Referee: Gal Levy

3 August 2022 Match 2	Maccabi Bnei Reineh	3–1	Hapoel Haifa	Nof HaGalil
20:30	Shalata (yellow card) 46' (goal) 55'; Halaf 60'; Abed 67'	Report	Meir (yellow card) 67'; Moțpan (yellow card) 77'; Arel 85' (pen.); Jabarin (yellow card) 85'	Stadium: Green; Attendance: 750; Referee: Erez Papir

13 August 2022 Match 4	Hapoel Haifa	1–3	Hapoel Hadera	Haifa
20:00	Silva (yellow card) 48'; Maman 71'; Taha (yellow card) 81'	Report	Fadida 38'; Cissé 68'; Bourard (yellow card) 81' (goal) 90+4'	Stadium: Sammy Ofer; Attendance: 1,200; Referee: Gal Leivovich

17 August 2022 Match 5	Hapoel Ironi Kiryat Shmona	0–0	Hapoel Haifa	Kiryat Shmona
20:00	Shviro (yellow card) 83'	Report	Kanyuk (yellow card) 37'; Quee (yellow card) 64'	Stadium: Kiryat Shmona Municipal; Attendance: 200; Referee: Igal Frid

=== 13–14th classification match ===
7 December 2022 13–14th	Sektzia Ness Ziona	5–4	Hapoel Haifa	Petah Tikva
19:00	Acka 19'; Kutalia 25'; Usman Edu 33'; Kochav (yellow card) 45'; Buzaglo 48'; Israeli (yellow card) 51'; Moura 68'	Report	Peretz 10'; Arel 45+1' (pen.) 52' (pen.); Kamara 89'	Stadium: HaMoshava; Attendance: 100; Referee: Orel Grinfeld

== Statistics ==
=== Appearances and goals ===
No.	Pos	Nat	Player	Total		Ligat Ha'Al		State Cup		Toto Cup	
No.	Pos	Nat	Player	Apps	Goals	Apps	Goals	Apps	Goals	Apps	Goals
1	GK	(Israel) ISR	Ran Kadoch	1	0	1	0	0	0	0	0
4	DF	(Israel) ISR	Dor Malul	33	1	27	1	2	0	4	0
5	DF	(Cyprus) CYP	Constantinos Soteriou	33	2	29	2	1	0	3	0
6	MF	(Israel) ISR	Gal Arel	30	5	23	2	2	0	5	3
7	MF	(Israel) ISR	Eliel Peretz	25	3	23	2	1	0	1	1
8	FW	(Haiti) HAI	Carnejy Antoine	11	0	11	0	0	0	0	0
9	MF	(Israel) ISR	Tomer Yosefi	10	2	10	2	0	0	0	0
10	FW	(Israel) ISR	Shoval Gozlan	15	2	12	2	0	0	3	0
11	MF	(Lithuania) LTU	Arvydas Novikovas	6	0	6	0	0	0	0	0
12	DF	(Israel) ISR	Oren Biton	14	0	12	0	1	0	1	0
13	DF	(Israel) ISR	Noam Ben Harush	2	0	2	0	0	0	0	0
14	DF	(Israel) ISR	Dudu Twito	28	1	24	1	2	0	2	0
15	MF	(Israel) ISR	Hanan Maman	36	3	29	2	2	0	5	1
16	FW	(Israel) ISR	Dudu Alterovich	2	0	0	0	0	0	2	0
17	FW	(Israel) ISR	Alon Turgeman	37	7	31	7	2	0	4	0
18	MF	(Israel) ISR	Yarin Serdal	4	0	1	0	1	0	2	0
19	FW	(Liberia) LBR	Mohammed Kamara	27	6	24	5	2	0	1	1
20	DF	(Israel) ISR	Loai Taha	20	0	16	0	2	0	2	0
21	GK	(Israel) ISR	Ohad Levita	39	0	32	0	2	0	5	0
22	DF	(Israel) ISR	Guy Mizrahi	25	1	23	1	1	0	1	0
24	DF	(Israel) ISR	Liran Serdal	30	7	25	4	2	3	3	0
25	FW	(Israel) ISR	Gebair Bushnak	7	0	6	0	0	0	1	0
26	MF	(Israel) ISR	Gidi Kanyuk	27	1	20	1	2	0	5	0
28	MF	(Montenegro) MNE	Aleksandar Šćekić	12	1	12	1	0	0	0	0
29	FW	(Israel) ISR	Itay Buganim	22	1	20	0	2	1	0	0
33	DF	(Belarus) BLR	Denis Polyakov	12	0	12	0	0	0	0	0
44	DF	(Israel) ISR	Hatem Abd Elhamed	22	1	22	1	0	0	0	0
50	GK	(Israel) ISR	Amit Suiri	0	0	0	0	0	0	0	0
66	MF	(Israel) ISR	Tamir Glazer	21	0	17	0	2	0	2	0
Players away from Hapoel Haifa on loan:
11	MF	(Israel) ISR	Amit Meir	8	0	6	0	0	0	2	0
23	FW	(Israel) ISR	Rauf Jabarin	2	0	0	0	0	0	2	0
Players who appeared for Hapoel Haifa that left during the season:
8	MF	(Portugal) POR	Leandro Silva	6	0	3	0	0	0	3	0
44	DF	(Romania) ROU	Andrei Miron	9	0	5	0	0	0	4	0
7	MF	(Moldova) MDA	Nichita Moțpan	8	0	4	0	1	0	3	0
34	DF	(Croatia) CRO	Dino Štiglec	13	0	9	0	0	0	4	0
77	MF	(Sierra Leone) SLE	Kwame Quee	25	1	18	0	2	1	5	0
55	DF	(Israel) ISR	Nisso Kapiloto	10	0	5	0	1	0	4	0
Tested players:
19	MF	(Israel) ISR	Roei Revinovich	1	0	0	0	0	0	1	0

=== Goalscorers ===
Rank	No.	Pos	Nat	Name	Ligat Ha'Al	State Cup	Toto Cup	Total
1	17	FW	(Israel)	Alon Turgeman	7	0	0	7
1	24	MF	(Israel)	Liran Serdal	4	3	0	7
3	19	FW	(Liberia)	Mohammed Kamara	5	0	1	6
4	6	MF	(Israel)	Gal Arel	2	0	3	5
5	7	MF	(Israel)	Eliel Peretz	2	0	1	3
5	15	MF	(Israel)	Hanan Maman	2	0	1	3
7	5	DF	(Cyprus)	Constantinos Soteriou	2	0	0	2
7	9	MF	(Israel)	Tomer Yosefi	2	0	0	2
7	10	FW	(Israel)	Shoval Gozlan	2	0	0	2
10	4	DF	(Israel)	Dor Malul	1	0	0	1
10	14	DF	(Israel)	Dudu Twito	1	0	0	1
10	22	DF	(Israel)	Guy Mizrahi	1	0	0	1
10	26	MF	(Israel)	Gidi Kanyuk	1	0	0	1
10	28	MF	(Montenegro)	Aleksandar Šćekić	1	0	0	1
10	44	DF	(Israel)	Hatem Abd Elhamed	1	0	0	1
10	29	FW	(Israel)	Itay Buganim	0	1	0	1
10	77	MF	(Sierra Leone)	Kwame Quee	0	1	0	1
Own goal					1	0	0	1
Totals					35	5	6	46

Last updated: 12 May 2019

=== Assists ===
Rank	No.	Pos	Nat	Name	Ligat Ha'Al	State Cup	Toto Cup	Total
1	7	MF	(Israel)	Eliel Peretz	5	0	0	5
2	15	MF	(Israel)	Hanan Maman	2	2	0	4
3	8	FW	(Haiti)	Carnejy Antoine	2	0	0	2
3	9	MF	(Israel)	Tomer Yosefi	2	0	0	2
3	17	FW	(Israel)	Alon Turgeman	2	0	0	2
3	19	FW	(Liberia)	Mohammed Kamara	1	1	0	2
3	26	MF	(Israel)	Gidi Kanyuk	0	1	1	2
8	4	DF	(Israel)	Dor Malul	1	0	0	1
8	5	DF	(Cyprus)	Constantinos Soteriou	1	0	0	1
8	7	MF	(Moldova)	Nichita Moțpan	1	0	0	1
8	11	MF	(Lithuania)	Arvydas Novikovas	1	0	0	1
8	12	DF	(Israel)	Oren Biton	1	0	0	1
8	14	DF	(Israel)	Dudu Twito	1	0	0	1
8	22	DF	(Israel)	Guy Mizrahi	1	0	0	1
8	24	MF	(Israel)	Liran Serdal	1	0	0	1
8	34	DF	(Croatia)	Dino Štiglec	1	0	0	1
8	77	MF	(Sierra Leone)	Kwame Quee	1	0	0	1
8	6	MF	(Israel)	Gal Arel	0	0	1	1
Totals					21	4	2	27

Last updated: 12 May 2019

=== Clean sheets ===
Updated on 12 May 2019

Rank	Pos.	No.	Nat	Name	Ligat Ha'Al	State Cup	Toto Cup	Total
1	21	GK	(Israel)	Ohad Levita	10	0	1	11
2	1	GK	(Israel)	Ran Kadoch	1	0	0	11
Totals					11	0	1	12

=== Disciplinary record ===
Updated on 12 May 2019

No.	Pos	Nat	Name	Ligat Ha'Al			State Cup			Toto Cup			Total		
No.	Pos	Nat	Name	Booked	(yellow card) (yellow-red card)	Sent off (straight red)	Booked	(yellow card) (yellow-red card)	Sent off (straight red)	Booked	(yellow card) (yellow-red card)	Sent off (straight red)	Booked	(yellow card) (yellow-red card)	Sent off (straight red)
19	FW	(Liberia)	Mohammed Kamara	9									9		
66	MF	(Israel)	Tamir Glazer	6		2							6		2
15	MF	(Israel)	Hanan Maman	8									8		
7	MF	(Israel)	Eliel Peretz	6		1							6		1
5	DF	(Cyprus)	Constantinos Soteriou	6	1								6	1	
24	DF	(Israel)	Liran Serdal	6	1								6	1	
6	MF	(Israel)	Gal Arel	4		1				1			5		1
4	DF	(Israel)	Dor Malul	5						1			6		
44	DF	(Israel)	Hatem Abd Elhamed	4		1							4		1
22	DF	(Israel)	Guy Mizrahi	5									5		
20	DF	(Israel)	Loai Taha	4						1			5		
77	MF	(Sierra Leone)	Kwame Quee	2		1				1			3		1
28	MF	(Montenegro)	Aleksandar Šćekić	4									4		
14	DF	(Israel)	Dudu Twito	3									3		
29	FW	(Israel)	Itay Buganim	2			1						3		
26	MF	(Israel)	Gidi Kanyuk	2						1			3		
11	MF	(Israel)	Amit Meir	1						2			3		
9	MF	(Israel)	Tomer Yosefi	2									2		
10	FW	(Israel)	Shoval Gozlan	2									2		
34	DF	(Croatia)	Dino Štiglec	2									2		
12	DF	(Israel)	Oren Biton	1									1		
17	FW	(Israel)	Alon Turgeman	1									1		
21	GK	(Israel)	Ohad Levita	1									1		
44	DF	(Romania)	Andrei Miron	1									1		
7	MF	(Moldova)	Nichita Moțpan							1			1		
8	MF	(Portugal)	Leandro Silva							1			1		
19	MF	(Israel)	Roei Revinovich							1			1		
23	FW	(Israel)	Rauf Jabarin							1			1		

=== Suspensions ===
Updated on 12 May 2019

Player	Date Received	Offence	Length of suspension		
Tamir Glazer	3 September 2022	(red card) 42' vs Bnei Sakhnin	1 Match	Hapoel Hadera (A)	10 September 2022
Liran Serdal	15 October 2022	(yellow card) 2' (yellow-red card) 25' vs F.C. Ashdod	1 Match	Sektzia Ness Zioera (H)	22 October 2022
Tamir Glazer	29 October 2022	(red card) 33' vs Beitar Jerusalem	1 Match	Hapoel Jerusalem (H)	5 November 2022
Kwame Quee	29 October 2022	(yellow card) 31' (red card) 74' vs Beitar Jerusalem	1 Match	Hapoel Jerusalem (H)	5 November 2022
Hatem Abd Elhamed	5 November 2022	(yellow card) 83' vs Hapoel Jerusalem	1 Match	Maccabi Tel Aviv (A)	12 November 2022
Hatem Abd Elhamed	9 November 2022	(red card) 90+5' vs Maccabi Haifa	1 Match	Ihud Bnei Shefa-'Amr (A)	12 December 2022
Eliel Peretz	24 December 2022	(red card) 15' vs Maccabi Bnei Reineh	1 Match	Bnei Sakhnin (A)	31 December 2022
Constantinos Soteriou	31 December 2022	(yellow card) 50' (yellow-red card) 85' vs Bnei Sakhnin	1 Match	Maccabi Haifa (A)	4 January 2023
Hanan Maman	31 December 2022	(yellow card) 10' vs Bnei Sakhnin	1 Match	Hapoel Hadera (H)	7 January 2023
Gal Arel	4 January 2023	(red card) 23' vs Maccabi Haifa	1 Match	Hapoel Hadera (H)	7 January 2023
Tamir Glazer	14 January 2023	(yellow card) 52' vs Maccabi Netanya	1 Match	Hapoel Be'er Sheva (H)	29 January 2023
Mohammed Kamara	14 January 2023	(yellow card) 70' vs Maccabi Netanya	1 Match	Hapoel Be'er Sheva (H)	29 January 2023
Liran Serdal	6 March 2023	(yellow card) 40' vs Maccabi Haifa	1 Match	Hapoel Ironi Kiryat Shmona (H)	19 March 2023
Dor Malul	6 March 2023	(yellow card) 69' vs Maccabi Haifa	1 Match	Hapoel Ironi Kiryat Shmona (H)	19 March 2023
Constantinos Soteriou	11 March 2023	(yellow card) 73' vs Maccabi Tel Aviv	1 Match	Beitar Jerusalem (A)	3 April 2023
Guy Mizrahi	19 March 2023	(yellow card) 90+6' vs Hapoel Ironi Kiryat Shmona	1 Match	Hapoel Tel Aviv (H)	15 April 2023
Mohammed Kamara	3 April 2023	(yellow card) 76' vs Beitar Jerusalem	1 Match	Bnei Sakhnin (H)	22 April 2023
Eliel Peretz	30 April 2023	(yellow card) 72' vs Hapoel Hadera	1 Match	Maccabi Bnei Reineh (A)	13 May 2023

=== Penalties ===
Updated on 12 May 2019

Date	Penalty Taker	Scored	Opponent	Competition
3.8.2022	Gal Arel	Yes	Maccabi Bnei Reineh	Toto Cup
28.8.2022	Hanan Maman	Yes	Maccabi Bnei Reineh	Ligat Ha'Al
7.12.2022	Gal Arel	Yes	Sektzia Ness Ziona	Toto Cup
7.12.2022	Gal Arel	Yes	Sektzia Ness Ziona	Toto Cup
17.12.2022	Gal Arel	Yes	Hapoel Tel Aviv	Ligat Ha'Al
31.12.2022	Gal Arel	Yes	Bnei Sakhnin	Ligat Ha'Al
7.1.2023	Gidi Kanyuk	No	Hapoel Hadera	Ligat Ha'Al
30.4.2023	Tomer Yosefi	Yes	Hapoel Hadera	Ligat Ha'Al
6.5.2023	Hanan Maman	No	Sektzia Ness Ziona	Ligat Ha'Al
13.5.2023	Dor Malul	Yes	Maccabi Bnei Reineh	Ligat Ha'Al

=== Overall ===
	Total	Home	Away
Games played	40	19	21
Games won	9	5	4
Games drawn	16	7	9
Games lost	15	7	8
Biggest win	4–0 vs. Maccabi Bnei Reineh	3–0 vs. Hapoel Hadera	2–0 vs. Sektzia Ness Ziona
Biggest loss	1–5 vs. Maccabi Haifa	1–3 vs. Hapoel Hadera	1–5 vs. Maccabi Haifa
Biggest win (League)	4–0 vs. Maccabi Bnei Reineh	3–0 vs. Hapoel Hadera	2–0 vs. Sektzia Ness Ziona
Biggest loss (League)	0–4 vs. F.C. Ashdod	1–2 vs. Bnei Sakhnin	0–4 vs. F.C. Ashdod
Biggest win (Cup)			
Biggest loss (Cup)	1–5 vs. Maccabi Haifa		1–5 vs. Maccabi Haifa
Biggest win (Toto)			
Biggest loss (Toto)	1–3 vs. Maccabi Bnei Reineh; 1–3 vs. Hapoel Hadera	1–3 vs. Hapoel Hadera	1–3 vs. Maccabi Bnei Reineh
Goals scored	46	15	31
Goals conceded	57	16	41
Goal difference	−11	−1	−10
Clean sheets	11	8	3
Average GF per game	1.15	0.79	1.48
Average GA per game	1.43	0.84	1.95
Yellow cards	103	47	56
Red cards	8	3	5
Most appearances	(Israel) Ohad Levita (39)		
Most goals	(Israel) Alon Turgeman, (Israel) Liran Serdal (7)		
Most Assist	(Israel) Eliel Peretz (5)		
Penalties for	10	2	8
Penalties against	6	2	4
Winning rate	22.5%	26.32%	19.05%

Source: Competitive matches
