= List of Israeli football transfers winter 2022–23 =

This is a list of Israeli football transfers for the 2022–23 Winter Transfer Window.

== Ligat Ha'Al ==
=== Beitar Jerusalem ===
In:

No.	Pos.	Nation	Player
—	GK	(Portugal) POR	Miguel Silva (from (Portugal) Marítimo)
—	DF	(Russia) RUS	Sergei Borodin (on loan from FC Krasnodar)
—	DF	(Israel) ISR	Grigori Morozov (from (Slovenia) Celje)
—	FW	(Nigeria) NGA	Fred Friday (from (Norway) Strømsgodset)

Out:

No.	Pos.	Nation	Player
—	DF	(Venezuela) VEN	Josua Mejías (Free agent)
—	DF	(Israel) ISR	David Huja (on loan to Hapoel Ashdod)
—	MF	(Israel) ISR	Aviel Zargari (to Maccabi Haifa)
—	MF	(Israel) ISR	Shay Ayzen (to Bnei Yehuda)
—	FW	(Israel) ISR	Stav Nahmani (to Hapoel Hadera, his player card still belongs to Maccabi Haifa)
—	FW	(Israel) ISR	Ronen Hanchis (to Hapoel Rishon LeZion, his player card still belongs to Maccabi Tel Aviv)
—	FW	(Israel) ISR	Roy Doga (on loan to F.C. Kafr Qasim)

=== Bnei Sakhnin ===
In:

No.	Pos.	Nation	Player
—	DF	(Ivory Coast) CIV	Abou Dosso (from Hapoel Tel Aviv)
—	MF	(Israel) ISR	Yuval Ashkenazi (from Maccabi Netanya)
—	MF	(Guadeloupe) GLP	Ange-Freddy Plumain (from Sektzia Ness Ziona)
—	FW	(Israel) ISR	Dor Hugi (from (Poland) Wisła Kraków)
—	FW	(Israel) ISR	Mohammed Badrana (from Hapoel Umm al-Fahm)

Out:

No.	Pos.	Nation	Player
—	DF	(Palestine) PLE	Abdallah Jaber (to Maccabi Bnei Reineh)
—	MF	(Guinea) GUI	Ibrahima Conté (to Maccabi Kabilio Jaffa)
—	FW	(Belgium) BEL	Jérémie Luvovadio (to F.C. Kafr Qasim)
—	FW	(Israel) ISR	Walid Darwish (to Hapoel Nof HaGalil)
—	FW	(Russia) RUS	German Onugkha (loan return to (Denmark) Vejle)

=== F.C. Ashdod ===
In:

No.	Pos.	Nation	Player
—	DF	(Israel) ISR	Obeida Hattab (Free transfer)
—	MF	(Israel) ISR	Elad Shahaf (from (Romania) FC Botoșani)
—	MF	(Israel) ISR	Michael Ohana (from Maccabi Netanya)
—	FW	(Israel) ISR	Roey Ben Shimon (on loan from Bnei Yehuda)
—	FW	(Netherlands) NED	Elton Acolatse (Free transfer)
—	FW	(Israel) ISR	Shavit Mazal (on loan from Hapoel Tel Aviv)

Out:

No.	Pos.	Nation	Player
—	MF	(Brazil) BRA	Lucas Salinas (Free agent)
—	MF	(Israel) ISR	Oz Bilu (on loan to Maccabi Netanya)
—	MF	(Ghana) GHA	Samuel Alabi (loan return to (Switzerland) Luzern)
—	MF	(Israel) ISR	Nir Hasson (on loan to Hapoel Ramat Gan)
—	FW	(Israel) ISR	Dor Jan (to Hapoel Jerusalem)
—	FW	(Israel) ISR	Yaniv Mizrahi (to Bnei Yehuda)

=== Hapoel Be'er Sheva ===
In:

No.	Pos.	Nation	Player
—	GK	(Sweden) SWE	Tom Amos (from (Sweden) J-Södra IF)
—	DF	(Israel) ISR	Amir Ariely (from (England) Barnsley)
—	FW	(Poland) POL	Patryk Klimala (from (United States) Red Bull New York)
—	FW	(Israel) ISR	Zahi Ahmed (from Hapoel Acre)

Out:

No.	Pos.	Nation	Player
—	GK	(Israel) ISR	Niv Eliasi (on loan to Hapoel Ramat HaSharon)
—	MF	(Israel) ISR	Tomer Yosefi (on loan to Hapoel Haifa)
—	MF	(Italy) ITA	Davide Petrucci (Free agent)
—	FW	(Israel) ISR	Muatasem Issawi (on loan to Hapoel Nof HaGalil)
—	FW	(Kosovo) KOS	Astrit Selmani (on loan to (Denmark) Midtjylland)

=== Hapoel Hadera ===
In:

No.	Pos.	Nation	Player
—	MF	(Israel) ISR	Ruslan Barsky (from Maccabi Bnei Reineh)
—	MF	(Israel) ISR	Ness Zamir (from Sektzia Ness Ziona)
—	FW	(Israel) ISR	Stav Nahmani (on loan from Maccabi Haifa)

Out:

No.	Pos.	Nation	Player
—	MF	(Israel) ISR	Nehorai Ifrach (to Ironi Tiberias, his player card still belongs to Maccabi Haifa)
—	FW	(Israel) ISR	Tom Berkovic (to Hapoel Kfar Saba)
—	FW	(Israel) ISR	Mohammed Khatib (to Hapoel Umm al-Fahm)

=== Hapoel Haifa ===
In:

No.	Pos.	Nation	Player
—	DF	(Israel) ISR	Oren Biton (Free transfer)
—	DF	(Belarus) BLR	Denis Polyakov (from (Kazakhstan) Astana)
—	MF	(Montenegro) MNE	Aleksandar Šćekić (from (United Arab Emirates) Dibba Al Fujairah)
—	MF	(Israel) ISR	Tomer Yosefi (on loan from Hapoel Be'er Sheva)
—	FW	(Lithuania) LTU	Arvydas Novikovas (from (Turkey) Samsunspor)
—	FW	(Haiti) HAI	Carnejy Antoine (from (Portugal) Casa Pia)

Out:

No.	Pos.	Nation	Player
—	DF	(Croatia) CRO	Dino Štiglec (Free agent)
—	DF	(Israel) ISR	Nisso Kapiloto (to Sektzia Ness Ziona)
—	MF	(Moldova) MDA	Nichita Moțpan (to (Moldova) CSF Bălți)
—	MF	(Israel) ISR	Amit Meir (to Maccabi Bnei Reineh)
—	MF	(Sierra Leone) SLE	Kwame Quee (Free agent)
—	FW	(Ukraine) UKR	Illya Markovskyi (to (Estonia) FCI Levadia)

=== Hapoel Jerusalem ===
In:

No.	Pos.	Nation	Player
—	DF	(Israel) ISR	Roy Revivo (on loan from Maccabi Tel Aviv)
—	FW	(Israel) ISR	Dor Jan (from F.C. Ashdod)
—	FW	(Israel) ISR	Noaf Bazea (from Maccabi Ahi Nazareth)

Out:

No.	Pos.	Nation	Player
—	DF	(Israel) ISR	Benny Tridovsky (to Hapoel Rishon LeZion, his player card still belongs to Hapoel Tel Aviv)
—	DF	(Israel) ISR	Alon Azugi (to Maccabi Petah Tikva, his player card still belongs to Hapoel Tel Aviv)
—	MF	(Nigeria) NGA	Bright Enobakhare (to (Ukraine) Rukh Lviv)
—	MF	(Israel) ISR	Goni Naor (to Maccabi Haifa)
—	FW	(Israel) ISR	Ahmed Salman (to Maccabi Netanya)

=== Hapoel Tel Aviv ===
In:

No.	Pos.	Nation	Player
—	GK	(Lithuania) LTU	Emilijus Zubas (from (Portugal) Arouca)
—	MF	(Croatia) CRO	Hrvoje Ilić (from (Croatia) BSK Bijelo Brdo)
—	MF	(Montenegro) MNE	Aleksandar Boljević (from (Belgium) Standard Liège)
—	FW	(Israel) ISR	Rave Asayag (from Hapoel Acre)

Out:

No.	Pos.	Nation	Player
—	GK	(New Zealand) NZL	Stefan Marinovic (Free agent)
—	DF	(Ivory Coast) CIV	Abou Dosso (to Bnei Sakhnin)
—	MF	(Spain) ESP	Pablo González (Free agent)
—	MF	(Israel) ISR	Sintayehu Sallalich (to (Cyprus) Nea Salamis Famagusta)
—	MF	(Israel) ISR	Idan Vered (to Hapoel Petah Tikva)
—	FW	(Israel) ISR	Shavit Mazal (on loan to F.C. Ashdod)

=== Ironi Kiryat Shmona ===
In:

No.	Pos.	Nation	Player
—	FW	(Belarus) BLR	Ivan Bakhar (from (Belarus) Dinamo Minsk)
—	FW	(Brazil) BRA	Gian (from (Kazakhstan) Kyzylzhar)

Out:

No.	Pos.	Nation	Player
—	FW	(Israel) ISR	Guy Ben Lulu (on loan to Hapoel Acre)
—	FW	(Malta) MLT	Joseph Mbong (loan return to (Malta) Ħamrun Spartans)

=== Maccabi Bnei Reineh ===
In:

No.	Pos.	Nation	Player
—	DF	(Palestine) PLE	Abdallah Jaber (from Bnei Sakhnin)
—	MF	(Israel) ISR	Amit Meir (from Hapoel Haifa)
—	MF	(Madagascar) MAD	Anicet Abel (from (Bulgaria) Beroe Stara Zagora)
—	FW	(Brazil) BRA	Gustavo Marmentini (on loan from (Greece) Lamia)
—	FW	(Hungary) HUN	Márk Koszta (from (Russia) Torpedo Moscow)

Out:

No.	Pos.	Nation	Player
—	DF	(Israel) ISR	Alon Ginat (to Hapoel Nof HaGalil, his player card still belongs to Maccabi Netanya)
—	MF	(Israel) ISR	Ruslan Barsky (to Hapoel Hadera)
—	MF	(Israel) ISR	Guy Hadida (to (Turkey) Sakaryaspor)
—	MF	(Ukraine) UKR	Oleksandr Noyok (Free agent)
—	MF	(Ghana) GHA	Issac Nortey (to Hapoel Umm al-Fahm)
—	FW	(Serbia) SRB	Lazar Jovanović (Free agent)

=== Maccabi Haifa ===
In:

No.	Pos.	Nation	Player
—	GK	(Israel) ISR	Shareef Kayouf (loan return from Hapoel Afula)
—	MF	(Israel) ISR	Bassam Zarora (loan return from Hapoel Afula)
—	MF	(Israel) ISR	Aviel Zargari (from Beitar Jerusalem)
—	MF	(Israel) ISR	Goni Naor (from Hapoel Jerusalem)
—	FW	(Israel) ISR	Dia Saba (from (Turkey) Sivasspor)

Out:

No.	Pos.	Nation	Player
—	DF	(Israel) ISR	Ofri Arad (on loan to (Kazakhstan) FC Kairat)
—	MF	(Israel) ISR	Maor Levi (on loan to Maccabi Petah Tikva)
—	MF	(Israel) ISR	Neta Lavi (to (Japan) Gamba Osaka)

=== Maccabi Netanya ===
In:

No.	Pos.	Nation	Player
—	DF	(France) FRA	Nassim Ouammou (from (France) Rodez)
—	MF	(Israel) ISR	Oz Bilu (on loan from Maccabi Netanya)
—	FW	(Israel) ISR	Ahmed Salman (from Hapoel Jerusalem)
—	FW	(Ukraine) UKR	Stanislav Bilenkyi (from (Georgia (country)) Dinamo Tbilisi)

Out:

No.	Pos.	Nation	Player
—	DF	(Germany) GER	Florian Hartherz (to (Poland) Podbeskidzie Bielsko-Biała)
—	DF	(Germany) GER	Erich Berko (to (Germany) Hallescher FC)
—	MF	(Israel) ISR	Yuval Ashkenazi (to Bnei Sakhnin)
—	MF	(Israel) ISR	Michael Ohana (to F.C. Ashdod)
—	MF	(Israel) ISR	Eden Kartsev (to (Turkey) İstanbul Başakşehir)
—	FW	(Israel) ISR	Gil Itzhak (to Hapoel Umm al-Fahm)
—	FW	(Israel) ISR	Moshe Mula (on loan to Maccabi Netanya)

=== Maccabi Tel Aviv ===
In:

No.	Pos.	Nation	Player
—	MF	(Romania) ROU	Rareș Ilie (on loan from Nice)
—	FW	(Israel) ISR	Eylon Almog (loan return from (Austria) TSV Hartberg)

Out:

No.	Pos.	Nation	Player
—	DF	(Israel) ISR	Roy Revivo (on loan to Hapoel Jerusalem)
—	DF	(Israel) ISR	Michael Chilaka (on loan to Hapoel Umm al-Fahm)
—	MF	(Israel) ISR	Assaf Hershko (on loan to Hapoel Petah Tikva)
—	MF	(Israel) ISR	Oscar Gloukh (to (Austria) Red Bull Salzburg)
—	MF	(Israel) ISR	Yonathan Paz (on loan to Maccabi Jaffa)
—	FW	(Panama) PAN	Eduardo Guerrero (on loan to (Ukraine) Zorya Luhansk)

=== Sektzia Ness Ziona ===
In:

No.	Pos.	Nation	Player
—	DF	(Israel) ISR	Nisso Kapiloto (from Hapoel Haifa)
—	MF	(Italy) ITA	Cristian Battocchio (Free transfer)
—	FW	(Colombia) COL	Bladimir Díaz (Free transfer)
—	FW	(Israel) ISR	Lior Inbrum (from Hapoel Umm al-Fahm)

Out:

No.	Pos.	Nation	Player
—	DF	(Israel) ISR	Itay Rotman (on loan to Hapoel Ramat Gan)
—	MF	(Guadeloupe) GLP	Ange-Freddy Plumain (to Bnei Sakhnin)
—	MF	(Ivory Coast) CIV	Aboubakar Keita (loan return to (Belgium) Charleroi)
—	MF	(Israel) ISR	Rotem Yatzkar (to Hapoel Ramat HaSharon, his player card still belongs to Maccabi Tel Aviv)
—	MF	(Israel) ISR	Ness Zamir (to Hapoel Hadera)

== Ligat Lemuit ==
=== Bnei Yehuda ===
In:

No.	Pos.	Nation	Player
—	MF	(Israel) ISR	Shay Ayzen (from Beitar Jerusalem)
—	MF	(Belarus) BLR	Gleb Zherdev (from (Belarus) Slavia Mozyr)
—	FW	(Israel) ISR	Shay Balahssan (on loan from Maccabi Tel Aviv)
—	FW	(Israel) ISR	Yaniv Mizrahi (from F.C. Ashdod)

Out:

No.	Pos.	Nation	Player
—	DF	(Israel) ISR	Dan Mori (Retired)
—	DF	(Israel) ISR	Omer Yitzhak (to Hapoel Kfar Saba, his player card still belongs to Maccabi Tel Aviv)
—	DF	(Israel) ISR	Gal Mayo (to Maccabi Petah Tikva)
—	DF	(Israel) ISR	Tom Ahi Mordechai (to Hapoel Kfar Saba)
—	MF	(Israel) ISR	Roy Dayan (to F.C. Kafr Qasim)
—	MF	(Israel) ISR	Adar Awat (to Hapoel Ashdod)
—	FW	(Brazil) BRA	Michael Thuíque (to (Lithuania) Hegelmann)
—	FW	(Israel) ISR	Roey Ben Shimon (on loan to F.C. Ashdod)
—	FW	(Ghana) GHA	Karim Abubakar (to (Azerbaijan) Sumgayit FK)

=== F.C. Kafr Qasim ===
In:

No.	Pos.	Nation	Player
—	DF	(Israel) ISR	Tzlil Nehemia (from Hapoel Nof HaGalil)
—	MF	(Israel) ISR	Shay Golan (from Hapoel Acre)
—	MF	(Israel) ISR	Roy Dayan (from Bnei Yehuda)
—	MF	(Israel) ISR	Liran Rigan (Free transfer)
—	MF	(Israel) ISR	Asil Kna'ani (from Maccabi Tamra)
—	FW	(Israel) ISR	Amer Al-Dadah (on loan from Ironi Kuseife)
—	FW	(Belgium) BEL	Jérémie Luvovadio (from Bnei Sakhnin)
—	FW	(Bulgaria) BUL	Zhivko Petkov (from (Bulgaria) Sozopol)
—	FW	(Israel) ISR	Eden Hershkovitz (from (Malta) Floriana)
—	FW	(Israel) ISR	Roy Doga (on loan from Beitar Jerusalem)

Out:

No.	Pos.	Nation	Player
—	GK	(Israel) ISR	Idan Vexelman (to Hapoel Ashkelon)
—	DF	(Israel) ISR	Muhammad Othman (to Hapoel Umm al-Fahm)
—	MF	(Israel) ISR	Netanel Achdut (to Maccabi Kiryat Malakhi)
—	MF	(Israel) ISR	Shay Mazor (to Hapoel Kfar Saba)
—	FW	(Nigeria) NGA	Ime Udo Ndom (Free agent)
—	FW	(France) FRA	Vamara Sanogo (to (Malta) Marsaxlokk)
—	FW	(Israel) ISR	Abdallah Khlaikhal (to Hapoel Ashdod)
—	FW	(Israel) ISR	Hassan Alaa A-Din (to Hapoel Umm al-Fahm)

=== Hapoel Acre ===
In:

No.	Pos.	Nation	Player
—	DF	(Israel) ISR	Ali Kayal (from Hapoel Ramat Gan)
—	FW	(Israel) ISR	Guy Ben Lulu (on loan from Ironi Kiryat Shmona)
—	FW	(United States) USA	Nana Akosah-Bempah (from (Czech Republic) FK Pardubice)

Out:

No.	Pos.	Nation	Player
—	MF	(Israel) ISR	Shay Golan (to F.C. Kafr Qasim)
—	FW	(Israel) ISR	Iyad Haj (to Hapoel Kfar Saba, his player card still belongs to Maccabi Netanya)
—	FW	(Israel) ISR	Rave Asayag (to Hapoel Tel Aviv)
—	FW	(Israel) ISR	Zahi Ahmed (to Hapoel Be'er Sheva)

=== Hapoel Afula ===
In:

No.	Pos.	Nation	Player
—	GK	(Israel) ISR	Golan Elkaslasy (Free transfer)
—	DF	(Israel) ISR	Lavi Shukrun (from Hapoel Nof HaGalil)
—	MF	(Israel) ISR	Yarden Cohen (from Maccabi Petah Tikva)
—	MF	(Israel) ISR	Itay Tako (from Hapoel Umm al-Fahm)

Out:

No.	Pos.	Nation	Player
—	GK	(Israel) ISR	Shareef Kayouf (loan return to Maccabi Haifa)
—	MF	(Israel) ISR	Bassam Zarora (loan return to Maccabi Haifa)
—	MF	(Israel) ISR	Kevin Rainstein (to Hapoel Nof HaGalil)

=== Hapoel Ashdod ===
In:

No.	Pos.	Nation	Player
—	DF	(Israel) ISR	David Huja (on loan from Beitar Jerusalem)
—	MF	(Israel) ISR	Adar Awat (from Bnei Yehuda)
—	MF	(Israel) ISR	Lior Katzav (from Beitar Tel Aviv Bat Yam)
—	FW	(Israel) ISR	Roei Fadida (Free transfer)
—	FW	(Israel) ISR	Gal Assulin (Free transfer)
—	FW	(Israel) ISR	Abdallah Khlaikhal (from F.C. Kafr Qasim)

Out:

No.	Pos.	Nation	Player
—	DF	(Israel) ISR	Roy Amos (Free agent)
—	FW	(Israel) ISR	Michael Ashkenazi (to Maccabi Ata Bialik)

=== Hapoel Kfar Saba ===
In:

No.	Pos.	Nation	Player
—	DF	(Israel) ISR	Omer Yitzhak (on loan from Maccabi Tel Aviv)
—	DF	(Israel) ISR	Tom Ahi Mordechai (from Bnei Yehuda)
—	MF	(Israel) ISR	Almog Ohayon (Free transfer)
—	MF	(Israel) ISR	Shay Mazor (from F.C. Kafr Qasim)
—	FW	(Israel) ISR	Iyad Haj (on loan from Maccabi Netanya)
—	FW	(Israel) ISR	Tom Berkovic (from Hapoel Hadera)
—	FW	(Israel) ISR	Yoel Abuhatzira (from Maccabi Ahi Nazareth)

Out:

No.	Pos.	Nation	Player
—	MF	(Israel) ISR	Omer Peretz (on loan to Shimshon Kafr Qasim)
—	FW	(Israel) ISR	Hayford Adjei (to F.C. Dimona, his player card still belongs to F.C. Ashdod)
—	FW	(Israel) ISR	Uziel Pardo (to Nordia Jerusalem, his player card still belongs to Beitar Jerusalem)
—	FW	(Israel) ISR	Gal Katabi (to Hapoel Rishon LeZion, his player card still belongs to Maccabi Haifa)

=== Hapoel Nof HaGalil ===
In:

No.	Pos.	Nation	Player
—	DF	(Israel) ISR	Alon Ginat (on loan from Maccabi Netanya)
—	DF	(Israel) ISR	Tzlil Nehemia (from (Lithuania) Hegelmann)
—	MF	(Israel) ISR	Kevin Rainstein (from Hapoel Afula)
—	MF	(Israel) ISR	Maharan Radi (Free transfer)
—	FW	(Nigeria) NGA	Lanre Kehinde (Free transfer)
—	FW	(Israel) ISR	Walid Darwish (from Bnei Sakhnin)
—	FW	(Israel) ISR	Muatasem Issawi (on loan from Hapoel Be'er Sheva)
—	FW	(Israel) ISR	Alon Buzorgi (Free transfer)

Out:

No.	Pos.	Nation	Player
—	GK	(Israel) ISR	Sagi Malul (Free agent)
—	GK	(Israel) ISR	Amit Keren (to Ironi Modi'in)
—	DF	(Israel) ISR	Tzlil Nehemia (to F.C. Kafr Qasim)
—	DF	(Israel) ISR	Lavi Shukrun (to Hapoel Afula)
—	MF	(Israel) ISR	Daniel Twizer (Free agent)
—	MF	(Guinea-Bissau) GNB	João Jaquité (Free agent)
—	MF	(Israel) ISR	Roy Buganim (on loan to Hapoel Migdal HaEmek)
—	FW	(Ghana) GHA	Alfred Mensah (Free agent)

=== Hapoel Petah Tikva ===
In:

No.	Pos.	Nation	Player
—	MF	(Israel) ISR	Assaf Hershko (on loan from Maccabi Tel Aviv)
—	MF	(Israel) ISR	Idan Vered (from Hapoel Tel Aviv)

Out:

No.	Pos.	Nation	Player
—	MF	(Israel) ISR	Yarden Cohen (to Hapoel Afula)

=== Hapoel Ramat Gan ===
In:

No.	Pos.	Nation	Player
—	DF	(Israel) ISR	Mor Naaman (Free transfer)
—	DF	(Israel) ISR	Itay Rotman (on loan from Sektzia Ness Ziona)
—	MF	(Israel) ISR	Nir Hasson (on loan from F.C. Ashdod)
—	MF	(Israel) ISR	Dor Galili (Free transfer)

Out:

No.	Pos.	Nation	Player
—	DF	(Israel) ISR	Ofer Verta (to Maccabi Herzliya)
—	DF	(Israel) ISR	Ali Kayal (to Hapoel Acre)
—	MF	(Israel) ISR	Omer Lakao (to Maccabi Yavne)

=== Hapoel Ramat HaSharon ===
In:

No.	Pos.	Nation	Player
—	GK	(Israel) ISR	Niv Eliasi (on loan from Hapoel Be'er Sheva)
—	MF	(Israel) ISR	Dan Sirkis (from Hapoel Ramat HaSharon)
—	MF	(Israel) ISR	Rotem Yatzkar (on loan from Maccabi Tel Aviv)
—	FW	(Nigeria) NGA	Peter Onyekachi (Free transfer)
—	FW	(Israel) ISR	Guy Amsalem (on loan from Maccabi Jaffa)
—	FW	(Israel) ISR	Roy Melika (Free transfer)

Out:

No.	Pos.	Nation	Player
—	MF	(Nigeria) NGA	Ibeh Ransom (to (Armenia) Ararat Yerevan)
—	FW	(Israel) ISR	Aviel Ben Hemo (to Hapoel Umm al-Fahm)
—	FW	(Nigeria) NGA	Emmanuel Alaribe (Free agent)

=== Hapoel Rishon LeZion ===
In:

No.	Pos.	Nation	Player
—	DF	(Israel) ISR	Benny Tridovsky (on loan from Hapoel Tel Aviv)
—	FW	(Israel) ISR	Ronen Hanchis (on loan from Maccabi Tel Aviv)
—	FW	(Israel) ISR	Gal Katabi (on loan from Maccabi Haifa)

Out:

No.	Pos.	Nation	Player
—	MF	(Israel) ISR	Zion Tzemah (to Maccabi Sha'arayim)

=== Hapoel Umm al-Fahm ===
In:

No.	Pos.	Nation	Player
—	DF	(Israel) ISR	Muhammad Othman (from F.C. Kafr Qasim)
—	DF	(Israel) ISR	Michael Chilaka (on loan from Maccabi Tel Aviv)
—	MF	(Ghana) GHA	Issac Nortey (from Maccabi Bnei Reineh)
—	FW	(Israel) ISR	Gil Itzhak (from Maccabi Netanya)
—	FW	(Israel) ISR	Mohammed Khatib (from Hapoel Hadera)
—	FW	(Israel) ISR	Aviel Ben Hemo (from Hapoel Ramat HaSharon)
—	FW	(Israel) ISR	Hassan Alaa A-Din (to F.C. Kafr Qasim)

Out:

No.	Pos.	Nation	Player
—	GK	(Israel) ISR	Khaled Azam (to Ihud Bnei Shefa-'Amr)
—	MF	(Israel) ISR	Daniel Twizer (Free agent)
—	MF	(Colombia) COL	Sebastián Velásquez (Free agent)
—	MF	(Israel) ISR	Itay Tako (to Hapoel Afulaf)
—	FW	(Israel) ISR	Mohammed Badrana (to Bnei Sakhnin)
—	FW	(Israel) ISR	Lior Inbrum (to Sektzia Ness Ziona)

=== Ironi Tiberias ===
In:

No.	Pos.	Nation	Player
—	MF	(Israel) ISR	Nehorai Ifrach (on loan from Maccabi Haifa)

Out:

No.	Pos.	Nation	Player
—	MF	(Israel) ISR	Yitzhak Danan

=== Maccabi Ahi Nazareth ===
In:

No.	Pos.	Nation	Player

Out:

No.	Pos.	Nation	Player
—	MF	(Israel) ISR	Mohammed Gadir (to Maccabi Nujeidat, his player card still belongs to Maccabi Haifa)
—	FW	(Israel) ISR	Yoel Abuhatzira (to Hapoel Kfar Saba)
—	FW	(Israel) ISR	Noaf Bazea (from Maccabi Ahi Nazareth)

=== Maccabi Jaffa ===
In:

No.	Pos.	Nation	Player
—	MF	(Guinea) GUI	Ibrahima Conté (from Bnei Sakhnin)
—	MF	(Israel) ISR	Yonathan Paz (on loan from Maccabi Tel Aviv)
—	FW	(Israel) ISR	Dudu Biton (from Maccabi Petah Tikva)
—	FW	(Israel) ISR	Nuriel Buzaglo (from Ironi Modi'in)

Out:

No.	Pos.	Nation	Player
—	DF	(Israel) ISR	Liel Biton (to Hapoel Kfar Shalem)
—	MF	(Israel) ISR	Shay Balahssan (to Bnei Yehuda, his player card still belongs to Maccabi Tel Aviv)
—	MF	(Israel) ISR	Tal Ayala (to Hapoel Kfar Shalem)
—	FW	(Israel) ISR	Guy Amsalem (on loan to Hapoel Ramat HaSharon)

=== Maccabi Petah Tikva ===
In:

No.	Pos.	Nation	Player
—	DF	(Israel) ISR	Gal Mayo (from Bnei Yehuda)
—	DF	(Israel) ISR	Alon Azugi (on loan from Hapoel Tel Aviv)
—	MF	(Israel) ISR	Maor Levi (on loan from Maccabi Haifa)
—	FW	(Israel) ISR	Moshe Mula (on loan from Maccabi Netanya)

Out:

No.	Pos.	Nation	Player
—	FW	(Israel) ISR	Dudu Biton (to Maccabi Jaffa)
—	FW	(Israel) ISR	Ron Ashkenazi (Free agent)
