= 2024–25 FC UTA Arad season =

FC UTA Arad
2024–25 season
- Manager: Mircea Rednic
- Stadium: Francisc von Neuman Stadium
- Liga I: 7th
- Cupa României: Pre-season
- Highest home attendance: 10,374
- Average home league attendance: 6,873
Home colours	Away colours	Third colours

The 2024–25 season is the 80th season in the history of FC UTA Arad, and the club's fifth consecutive season in Liga I. In addition to the domestic league, the team is scheduled to participate in the Cupa României.

== Transfers ==
=== In ===
Pos.	Player	Transferred from	Fee	Date	Source
MF	(Belgium) Benjamin Van Durmen	(Romania) FC U Craiova 1948	Free	1 July 2024	
FW	(Nigeria) Jordan Attah Kadiri	(Belgium) Lommel	Free	1 July 2024	
FW	(Palestine) Loai Halaf	(Israel) Maccabi Bnei Reineh	Free	1 July 2024	
GK	(Romania) Robert Popa	(Romania) FC U Craiova 1948	Undisclosed	1 July 2024	
GK	(North Macedonia) Dejan Iliev	(Bosnia and Herzegovina) FK Sarajevo	Free	1 July 2024	
DF	(Ivory Coast) Kouya Mabea	(Israel) Hapoel Rishon LeZion	Free	1 July 2024	
FW	(Romania) Andrei Dumiter	(Romania) Voluntari	Free	1 July 2024	
MF	(Romania) Cornel Râpă	(Poland) Cracovia	Free	1 July 2024	
MF	(Italy) Luca Innocenti	(Italy) Mobilieri Ponsacco		1 July 2024	
MF	(Romania) Valentin Costache	(Cyprus) Apollon Limassol	Free	9 July 2024	

=== Out ===
Pos.	Player	Transferred to	Fee	Date	Source
DF	(Croatia) Marko Stolnik	(Cyprus) AEL Limassol	End of contract	1 July 2024	
DF	(Romania) Tiberiu Căpușă	(Romania) FC Hermannstadt	End of contract	1 July 2024	
FW	(Romania) Alexandru Tudorie	(Romania) Petrolul Ploiești	End of contract	1 July 2024	

== Friendlies ==
=== Pre-season ===
UTA prepared in Slovenia from 20 June to 1 July.

24 June 2024 Friendly	UTA Arad (Romania)	1–2	(Bosnia and Herzegovina) Borac Banja Luka	Rogla, Slovenia
17:00	Ezekiel 61' (pen.)		Stojan Vranješ 37'; Đajić 48'	Stadium: Štadion Rogla

28 June 2024 Friendly	UTA Arad (Romania)	1–3	(Bosnia and Herzegovina) Sarajevo	Rogla, Slovenia
17:30	Ibrahima Conte 34'		Catakovic 57'; Beganovic 68'; Andusic 79'	Stadium: Štadion Rogla

29 June 2024 Friendly	ASK Voitsberg (Austria)	1–7	(Romania) UTA Arad
18:00

30 June 2024 Friendly	UTA Arad (Romania)	v	(Serbia) Napredak Kruševac

5 July 2024 Friendly	UTA Arad (Romania)	v	(Serbia) Železničar Pančevo

== Competitions ==
=== Overall record ===
Competition	First match	Last match	Starting round	Record							
Competition	First match	Last match	Starting round	Pld	W	D	L	GF	GA	GD	Win %
Liga I	13 July 2024		Matchday 1	4	1	2	1	4	5	−1	25.00
Cupa României				0	0	0	0	0	0	+0	—
Total				4	1	2	1	4	5	−1	25.00

Last updated: 5 August 2024
Source: Soccerway

=== Liga I ===
==== League table ====
Pos	Team	Pld	W	D	L	GF	GA	GD	Pts	Advances
9	Petrolul Ploiești	30	9	13	8	29	29	0	40	Qualification for play-out round
10	Farul Constanța	30	8	11	11	29	38	−9	35	Qualification for play-out round
11	UTA Arad	30	8	10	12	28	35	−7	34	Qualification for play-out round
12	Oțelul Galați	30	7	11	12	24	32	−8	32	Qualification for play-out round
13	Politehnica Iași	30	8	7	15	29	46	−17	31 (Note: Ranked on head-to-head points: Politehnica Iași (4); Botoșani (1).)	Qualification for play-out round

Source: LPF (in Romanian)
Rules for classification: 1) Points; 2) Head-to-head points; 3) Head-to-head goal difference; 4) Head-to-head goals scored; 5) Goal difference; 6) Goals scored; 7) Play-off.

==== Results summary ====
Overall								Home						Away					
Pld	W	D	L	GF	GA	GD	Pts	W	D	L	GF	GA	GD	W	D	L	GF	GA	GD
4	1	2	1	4	5	−1	5	0	2	0	1	1	0	1	0	1	3	4	−1

Last updated: 5 August 2024.

==== Results by round ====
Round	1	2	3	4
Ground	H	A	H	A
Result	D	L	D	W
Position	7	13	13	7

Updated to match(es) played on 5 August 2024. Source:
A = Away; H = Home; W = Win; D = Draw; L = Loss

==== Matches ====
The match schedule was released on 1 July 2024.

13 July 2024 1	UTA Arad	1–1	Rapid București	Arad
19:15 UTC+3	Cîmpanu 60'; Omondi (yellow card) 90'; Halaf (yellow card) 90+3'; Pedro (yellow card) 90+6'		Braun 23'; El Sawy (yellow card) 90+3'; Iacob (yellow card) 90+4'; Aioani (yellow card) 90+4'	Stadium: Francisc von Neuman Stadium; Attendance: 10,000; Referee: Sebastian Colțescu

20 July 2024 2	Universitatea Craiova	4–2	UTA Arad	Craiova
19:00 UTC+3	Zajkov 35'; Paradela 58'; Baiaram 73'; Mitriță 90+3'		Ezekiel 45'; Benga 90+2'	Stadium: Ion Oblemenco Stadium; Referee: Andrei Florin Chivulete

29 July 2024 3	UTA Arad	0–0	Universitatea Cluj	Arad
19:00 UTC+3			Chipciu (yellow card) 75'; Masoero (yellow card) 84'	Stadium: Francisc von Neuman Stadium; Referee: István Kovács

5 August 2024 4	Unirea Slobozia	0–1	UTA Arad	Clinceni
19:00 UTC+3			Costache 73'	Stadium: Clinceni Stadium; Referee: Iulian Călin
