= 2022–23 Toto Cup Al =

Tournament details
- Country: Israel
- Teams: 14

Final positions
- Champions: Maccabi Netanya (1st title)
- Runners-up: Hapoel Be'er Sheva
- Semifinalists: Hapoel Hadera; Hapoel Tel Aviv

Tournament statistics
- Matches played: 30
- Goals scored: 81 (2.7 per match)
- All statistics correct as of 21 May 2023.

The 2022–23 Toto Cup Al is the 38th season of the third-important football tournament in Israel since its introduction and the 16th tournament involving Israeli Premier League clubs only.

Maccabi Haifa were the defending champions.

== Format ==
The four clubs playing in the UEFA competitions (Maccabi Haifa, Hapoel Be'er Sheva, Maccabi Tel Aviv and Maccabi Netanya) will not take part in the group stage, while the remaining ten clubs were divided into two groups of five, at the end of the group stage each of the group winners will qualify to the semi-finals. Maccabi Haifa and Hapoel Be'er Sheva will play in the 2022 Israel Super Cup match for a place in one of the semi-finals (meeting the group winner with the least points accumulated), while Maccabi Tel Aviv and Maccabi Netanya will play for a place in the other semi-final (meeting the group winner with the most points accumulated) . All clubs will participate in classification play-offs to determine their final positions.

== Group stage ==
Groups were allocated according to geographic distribution of the clubs, with the northern clubs allocated to Group A, and the southern clubs allocated to Group B. Each club will play the other clubs once.

The matches were scheduled to start on 30 July 2022.

=== Group A ===
| Pos | Team | Pld | W | D | L | GF | GA | GD | Pts | Qualification | HHD | BnS | IKS | MBR | HHA |
|---|---|---|---|---|---|---|---|---|---|---|---|---|---|---|---|
| 1 | Hapoel Hadera | 4 | 4 | 0 | 0 | 7 | 2 | +5 | 12 | Semi-finals | | | 1–0 | 1–0 | |
| 2 | Bnei Sakhnin | 4 | 2 | 1 | 1 | 7 | 5 | +2 | 7 | 5–8th classification play-offs | 1–2 | | | 2–1 | |
| 3 | Ironi Kiryat Shmona | 4 | 1 | 2 | 1 | 4 | 4 | 0 | 5 | 9–10th classification play-offs | | 2–2 | | | 0–0 |
| 4 | Maccabi Bnei Reineh | 4 | 1 | 0 | 3 | 5 | 6 | −1 | 3 | 11–12th classification play-offs | | | 1–2 | | 3–1 |
| 5 | Hapoel Haifa | 4 | 0 | 1 | 3 | 2 | 8 | −6 | 1 | 13–14th classification play-offs | 1–3 | 0–2 | | | |

Source: Israel Football Association, One.co.il
Rules for classification: 1) points; 2) goal difference; 3) number of wins; 4) goals scored; 5) head to head; 6)higher position in the last season.

=== Group B ===
| Pos | Team | Pld | W | D | L | GF | GA | GD | Pts | Qualification | HTA | HJE | BEI | ASH | SNZ |
|---|---|---|---|---|---|---|---|---|---|---|---|---|---|---|---|
| 1 | Hapoel Tel Aviv | 4 | 3 | 0 | 1 | 10 | 6 | +4 | 9 | Semi-finals | | | 2–0 | 2–3 | |
| 2 | Hapoel Jerusalem | 4 | 2 | 0 | 2 | 4 | 4 | 0 | 6 | 5–8th classification play-offs | 1–3 | | | | 2–0 |
| 3 | Beitar Jerusalem | 4 | 1 | 2 | 1 | 5 | 5 | 0 | 5 | 9–10th classification play-offs | | 1–0 | | | 1–1 |
| 4 | F.C. Ashdod | 4 | 1 | 1 | 2 | 5 | 6 | −1 | 4 | 11–12th classification play-offs | | 0–1 | 2–2 | | |
| 5 | Sektzia Ness Ziona | 4 | 1 | 1 | 2 | 3 | 6 | −3 | 4 | 13–14th classification play-offs | 1–3 | | | 1–0 | |

Source: Israel Football Association, One.co.il
Rules for classification: 1) points; 2) goal difference; 3) number of wins; 4) goals scored; 5) head to head; 6)higher position in last season.

== European qualification route ==
=== Israel Super Cup ===
16 July 2022
20:30

| Maccabi Haifa | 1–1 | Hapoel Be'er Sheva |
|---|---|---|
| Atzili 1', (yellow card) 76'; Haziza (yellow card) 41' | Report | (yellow card) 45' Bareiro; (yellow card) 56', (goal) 70' Ansah; (yellow card) 75' Dadia |
Penalties
| Chery (penalty scored); Abu Fani (penalty scored); Atzili (penalty missed); David (penalty scored); Pierrot (penalty missed) | 3–4 | (penalty missed) Madmon; (penalty scored) Lopes; (penalty scored) Yosefi; (penalty scored) Dadia; (penalty scored) Hemed |

Sammy Ofer Stadium, Haifa
Referee: Roi Reinshreiber

=== UEFA qualifiers match ===
14 July 2022
20:00

| Maccabi Tel Aviv | 0–0 | Maccabi Netanya |
|---|---|---|
| | Report |
Penalties
| Rikan (penalty missed); Almog (penalty scored); Enric (penalty scored); Hozez (penalty scored); Perica (penalty scored); Nachmias (penalty missed) | 4–5 | (penalty missed) Karzev; (penalty scored) Ashkenazi; (penalty scored) Yuval Sadeh; (penalty scored) Berkovits; (penalty scored) Twumasi; (penalty scored) Shlomo |

Bloomfield Stadium, Tel Aviv
Attendance: 10,061
Referee: Snir Levi

== Classification play-offs ==
=== 13–14th classification match ===
| 7 December 2022 13–14 place | Sektzia Ness Ziona | 5–4 | Hapoel Haifa | Petah Tikva |
| 19:00 | | Report | | Stadium: HaMoshava Stadium |

=== 11–12th classification match ===
| 8 December 2022 11–12 place | F.C. Ashdod | 0–1 | Maccabi Bnei Reineh | Ashdod |
| 19:00 | | Report | | Stadium: Yud-Alef Stadium |

=== 9–10th classification match ===
| 7 December 2022 9–10 place | Beitar Jerusalem | 1–3 | Ironi Kiryat Shmona | Jerusalem |
| 19:45 | | Report | | Stadium: Teddy Stadium |

=== 7–8th classification match ===
| 7 December 2022 7–8 place | Maccabi Tel Aviv | 2–0 | Hapoel Jerusalem | Tel Aviv |
| 20:00 | | Report | | Stadium: Bloomfield Stadium |

=== 5–6th classification match ===
| 8 December 2022 5–6 place | Maccabi Haifa | 4–1 | Bnei Sakhnin | Haifa |
| 20:15 | Chery 8'; Atzili 34'; David 37'; Arad 62' | Report | 69' Awaed | Stadium: Sammy Ofer Stadium |

== Semi-finals ==
| 7 December 2022 Semi final | Maccabi Netanya | 0–0 (5–4 p) | Hapoel Hadera | Netanya |
| 20:15 | | Report | | Stadium: Netanya Stadium |

| 8 December 2022 Semi final | Hapoel Be'er Sheva | 3–3 (4–3 p) | Hapoel Tel Aviv | Be'er Sheva |
| 20:00 | | Report | | Stadium: Turner Stadium |

== Final ==
| 18 January 2023 Final | Maccabi Netanya | 0–0 (5–4 p) | Hapoel Be'er Sheva | Petah Tikva |
| 20:00 | | Report | | Stadium: HaMoshava Stadium; Attendance: 8,830 |

== Final rankings ==
| R | Team |
|---|---|
| 1st place, gold medalist(s) | Maccabi Netanya |
| 2nd place, silver medalist(s) | Hapoel Be'er Sheva |
| 3rd place, bronze medalist(s) | Hapoel Hadera |
| 3rd place, bronze medalist(s) | Hapoel Tel Aviv |
| 5 | Maccabi Haifa |
| 6 | Bnei Sakhnin |
| 7 | Maccabi Tel Aviv |
| 8 | Hapoel Jerusalem |
| 9 | Hapoel Ironi Kiryat Shmona |
| 10 | Beitar Jerusalem |
| 11 | Maccabi Bnei Reineh |
| 12 | F.C. Ashdod |
| 13 | Sektzia Ness Ziona |
| 14 | Hapoel Haifa |
