= Lior Reuven =

Israeli footballer

Lior Reuven ליאור ראובן
Personal information
- Full name: Lior Reuven
- Date of birth: 12 December 1980 (age 45)
- Place of birth: Kiryat Ono, Israel
- Height: 1.81 m (5 ft 11 1/2 in)
- Position: Right back

Youth career
- Hapoel Kiryat Ono
- Maccabi Tel Aviv
- Beitar Tel Aviv

Senior career*
Years	Team	Apps	(Gls)
2001–2004	Hapoel Nir Ramat HaSharon		
2004–2005	Hapoel Ashkelon		
2005–2006	Hapoel Nir Ramat HaSharon	29	(1)
2006–2007	Hakoah Amidar Ramat Gan	26	(0)
2007–2009	F.C. Ashdod	42	(0)
2009–2010	Hapoel Acre	25	(0)
2010–2011	Beitar Jerusalem	17	(0)
2011–2012	Maccabi Netanya	29	(0)
2012–2014	Hapoel Ramat Gan	26	(0)
2014	Hapoel Bnei Lod	5	(0)
2014–2015	Maccabi Sha'arayim	22	(1)
2015–2017	Hapoel Bik'at HaYarden	46	(1)
2017	F.C. Ironi Or Yehuda	4	(1)
2017–2018	Hapoel Hod HaSharon	4	(0)
2018–2019	Hapoel Azor	33	(0)

Managerial career
- 2019: Hapoel Azor (assistant manager)
- 2019–2021: Hapoel Azor
- 2022–2023: F.C. Kafr Qasim (assistant manager)
- 2024: Hapoel Ramat HaSharon (assistant manager)
- 2024–2025: Hapoel Ramat HaSharon
- 2025–2026: Bnei Sakhnin (assistant manager)
- 2026–: Maccabi Bnei Reineh
- * Club domestic league appearances and goals

Lior Reuven (Hebrew: ליאור ראובן; born 12 December 1980) is a former Israeli footballer.

== Honours ==
- Liga Artzit
  - 2003–04, 2004–05
- Toto Cup Artzit
  - 2003–04
- Israel State Cup
  - 2013
