= Loai Halaf =

Israeli footballer (born 2000)

Personal information
- Date of birth: 8 August 2000 (age 26)
- Place of birth: Basmat Tab'un, Israel
- Height: 1.85 m (6 ft 1 in)
- Positions: Midfielder; forward

Team information
- Current team: Bnei Sakhnin
- Number: 16

Youth career
- 2008–2013: Ironi Nesher
- 2013–2016: Beitar Haifa
- 2016–2020: Ironi Nesher

Senior career*
Years	Team	Apps	(Gls)
2019–2021	Ironi Nesher	47	(11)
2020–2021	→ Hapoel Acre (loan)	3	(0)
2021–2024	Maccabi Bnei Reineh	84	(7)
2024	UTA Arad	4	(0)
2024–2026	Maccabi Netanya	26	(1)
2026–	Bnei Sakhnin	0	(0)

International career
2022	Israel U21	1	(0)
- * Club domestic league appearances and goals as of 1 June 2026

Loai Halaf (Arabic: لؤي حلف, Hebrew: לואי חלף; born 8 August 2000) is an Israeli professional footballer who plays as a midfielder or forward for Israeli Premier League club Bnei Sakhnin.

== Life and career ==
Halaf was born on 8 August 2000 in Basmat Tab'un, Israel. He is ethnically Arab. In 2008, Halaf joined the youth academy of Israeli side Ironi Nesher. In 2013, he joined the youth academy of Israeli side Beitar Haifa. In 2016, he returned to the youth academy of Israeli side Ironi Nesher. He started his senior career with Israeli side Ironi Nesher. In 2020, he was sent on loan to Israeli side Hapoel Acre.

In 2021, Halaf signed for Israeli side Maccabi Bnei Reineh. He helped the club win the league and achieve promotion. He was regarded as one of the club's most important players. In 2024, he almost signed for Israeli side Maccabi Netanya but the transfer never materialized. After that, he signed for Romanian side UTA Arad.

Halaf is an Israel youth international. He has played for the Israel national under-21 football team. On 16 November 2022, he debuted for the team during a 2–1 win over the Georgia national under-21 football team.

== Style of play ==
Halaf can operate as a forward. He can also operate as an attacking midfielder. He has been described as a "player with very good physical abilities... knows how to score goals, he has a fantastic head game". He has also been described as "knows how to dribble well on the line when needed and on the other hand is also not afraid to get into fights and help in the defensive game.".

== Honours ==
Maccabi Bnei Reineh

- Liga Leumit: 2021–22
