= Ohad Levita =

Israeli footballer

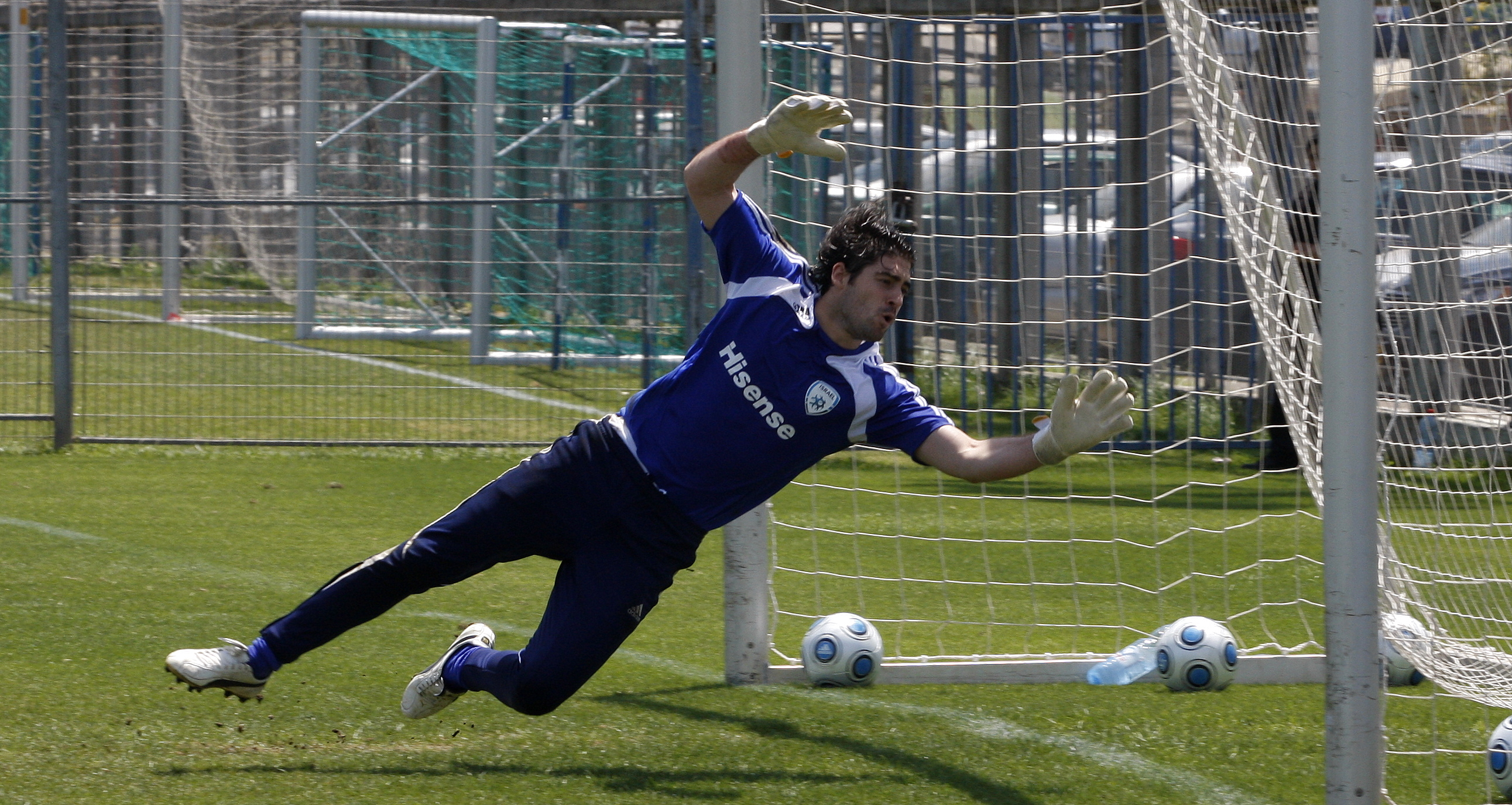
- Levita with Israel U21 in 2010

Personal information
- Full name: Ohad Levita
- Date of birth: 17 February 1986 (age 40)
- Place of birth: Kfar Saba, Israel
- Height: 1.86 m (6 ft 1 in)
- Position: Goalkeeper

Team information
- Current team: Bnei Yehuda

Youth career
- Hapoel Kfar Saba

Senior career*
Years	Team	Apps	(Gls)
2003–2009	Hapoel Kfar Saba	77	(0)
2009–2011	RKC Waalwijk	45	(0)
2011–2012	Hapoel Be'er Sheva	30	(0)
2012–2013	AC Omonia	18	(0)
2013–2014	Maccabi Netanya	34	(0)
2014–2018	Maccabi Haifa	25	(0)
2018–2021	Hapoel Be'er Sheva	68	(0)
2021–2023	Hapoel Haifa	59	(0)
2023–2025	Hapoel Hadera	39	(0)
2025–	Bnei Yehuda	15	(0)

International career
2004–2010	Israel U21	17	(0)
- * Club domestic league appearances and goals as of 03:17, 5 February 2026 (UTC)

Ohad Levita (Hebrew: אוהד לויטה; born 17 February 1986) is an Israeli footballer who plays for Bnei Yehuda.

== Club career ==
Levita played for local side Hapoel Kfar Saba, making his first team debut at the age of seventeen in the Israeli Premier League match against F.C. Ashdod. He gave up five goals in a 5–2 drubbing.

On 25 August 2009, Levita signed on a free transfer with Dutch club RKC Waalwijk.

On 5 October 2011, Levita signed on a free transfer with Israeli club Hapoel Be'er Sheva.

On 11 June 2012, Levita signed a contract with AC Omonia.

On 28 June 2013, Levita returned to Israel as he signed a 3 years contract with Maccabi Netanya. In his first season with the club he helped them win the Liga Leumit as well as reaching the finals of the State Cup. The following season he was loaned to Maccabi Haifa for one season, there he mainly sat on the bench as a second option.

== International career ==
Ohad made 17 caps and was also the captain of the Israeli U-21 national team.

His first call up for the senior national team came in May 2010 but he has yet to make a cap.

== Honours ==
=== Club ===
Hapoel Kfar Saba

- Israel Second Division (2): 2004–05, 2013–14

RKC Waalwijk

- Eerste Divisie (1): 2010–11

AC Omonia

- Cyprus FA Shield (1): 2012

Maccabi Haifa

- Israel State Cup (1): 2016
