= Basmat Tab'un =

Bedouin town in northern Israel

Basmat Tab'un: בּׂסְמַת טִבְעוֹן; بسمة طبعون
- Local council (from 1965)

Hebrew transcription(s)
  - ISO 259: Bosmat Ṭibˁon (Basmaẗ Ṭabˁūn)
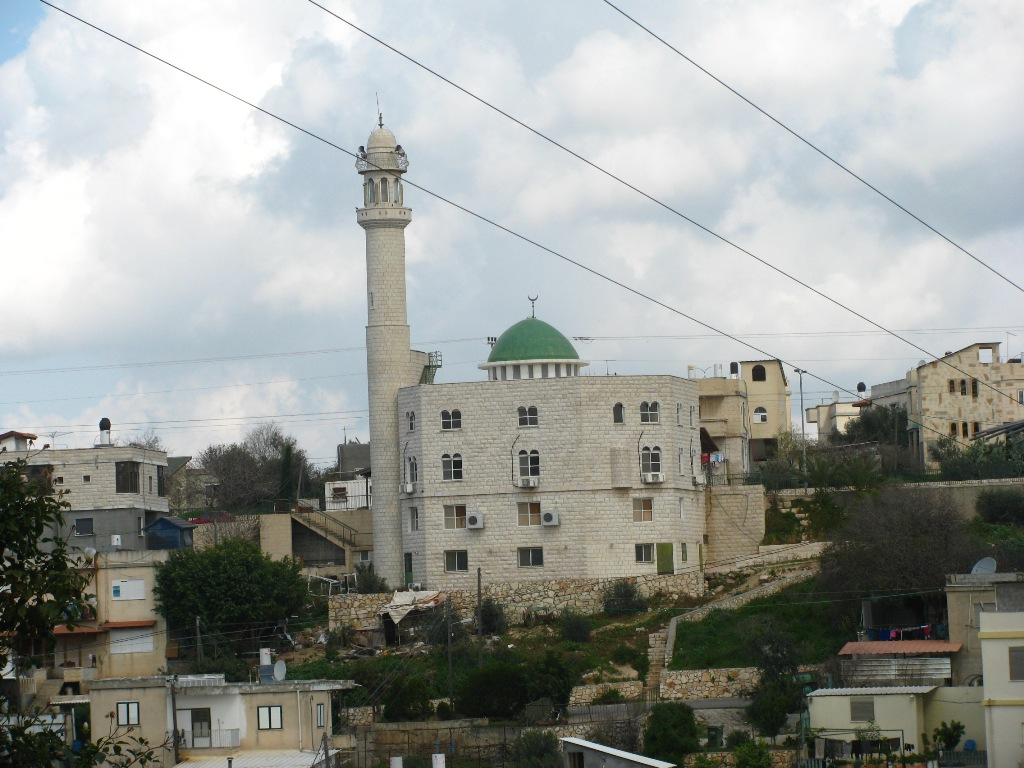
- Mosque of Basmat Tivon

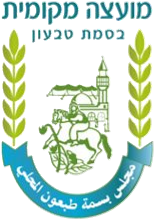
- Coat of arms

- Location within Jezreel Valley region of Israel Location within Israel
- Coordinates: 32°44′25″N 35°9′25″E
- Grid position: 163/235 PAL
- Country: Israel
- District: Northern
- Subdistrict: Jezreel
- Natural Region: Nazareth-Tir'an Mountains

Government
  - Head of Municipality: Raed Zebidat

Population (2024)
  - Total: 8,268

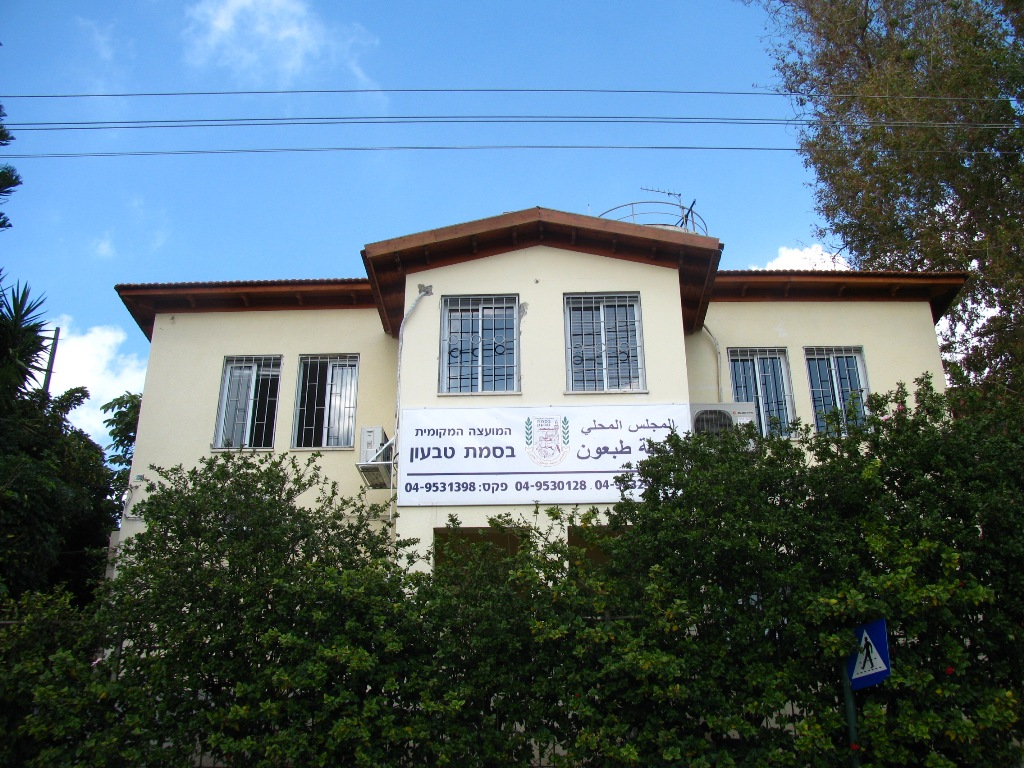
Municipality of Basmat Tab'un

Basmat Tab'un (Arabic: بسمة طبعون; Hebrew: בּׂסְמַת טִבְעוֹן, Basmat Tivon) is a Bedouin town in the Northern District of Israel. In 2024 it had a population of 8,268. In 2022, 100% of the population was Muslim.

== History ==
Basmat Tab'un was founded in 1965 by Israeli authorities as a settlement for al-Sa'adia and al-Zabidat, two Bedouin tribes who settled the area during the British Mandate. It was declared a local council. In May 2011, the Israeli government approved a four-year plan with a budget of NIS 350 million for developing Bedouin communities in the North, among them Basmat Tab'un.

The Ein Bustan (Maayan Babustan) Waldorf school in Hilf, Basmat Tab'un, is noteworthy for its multi-lingual, multi-cultural, multi-religious curriculum. The Arab students are from the surrounding villages and the Jewish students are from nearby Kiryat Tiv'on.

== Voting Patterns ==
In the 2022 election, 91 percent of voters in Basmat Tab'un voted for the Arab parties, while 5 percent voted for the parties of the center-left coalition led by Yair Lapid and 3 percent voted for the parties of the right-wing coalition led by Benjamin Netanyahu. Among the voters for the Arab parties, 74 percent voted for Ra'am, while 14 percent voted for Balad and 13 percent voted for the Hadash–Ta'al list.

In the 2026 election, 92 percent of voters in Basmat Tab'un voted for the Arab parties, while 6 percent voted for the parties of the center-left coalition led by Gadi Eisenkot and 0.5 percent voted for the parties of the right-wing coalition led by Benjamin Netanyahu. Among the voters for the Arab parties, 67 percent voted for Ra'am, while 33 percent voted for the Joint List. Voter turnout increased 93 percent from the 2022 election.

== Notable people ==
- Ruan Zubidate, Israel's top female Arab tennis player. She represents Israel at tennis matches around the world.

== See also ==
- Arab localities in Israel
- Bedouin In Israel

== Bibliography ==
- Conder, C.R.; Kitchener, H. H. (1881). The Survey of Western Palestine: Memoirs of the Topography, Orography, Hydrography, and Archaeology. Vol. 1. London: Committee of the Palestine Exploration Fund. (pp. 273, 309)
- Dauphin, C. (1998). La Palestine byzantine, Peuplement et Populations. BAR International Series 726 (in French). Vol. III : Catalogue. Oxford: Archeopress. ISBN 0-860549-05-4. (p. 681)
- Palmer, E. H. (1881). The Survey of Western Palestine: Arabic and English Name Lists Collected During the Survey by Lieutenants Conder and Kitchener, R. E. Transliterated and Explained by E.H. Palmer. Committee of the Palestine Exploration Fund. (p. 117)
