= Nichita Moțpan =

Moldovan footballer (born 2001)

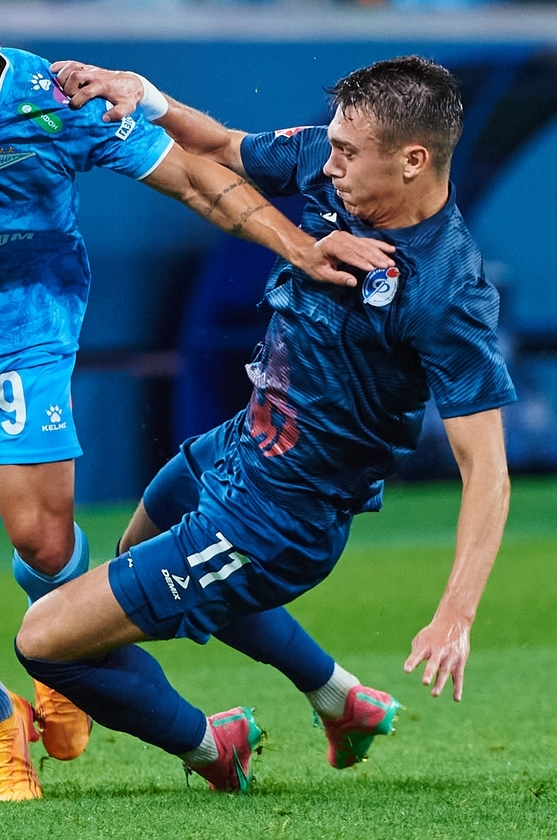
- Moțpan with Fakel Voronezh in 2024

Personal information
- Date of birth: 17 July 2001 (age 25)
- Place of birth: Bălți, Moldova
- Height: 1.77 m (5 ft 10 in)
- Position: Midfielder

Team information
- Current team: SKA-Khabarovsk
- Number: 7

Youth career
- 2017–2019: Rubin Kazan
- 2019–2020: Zaria Bălți

Senior career*
Years	Team	Apps	(Gls)
2020–2023	Bălți	33	(7 (Note: Moțpan also scored 13 goals in the 2020–21 Moldovan "A" Division, but the number of appearances is unknown.))
2022	→ Hapoel Haifa (loan)	4	(0)
2023–2026	Fakel Voronezh	73	(1)
2026–	SKA-Khabarovsk	0	(0)

International career^{‡}
2017	Moldova U17 (Note: Only official UEFA matches included)	3	(0)
2021–2022	Moldova U21	9	(0)
2022–	Moldova	37	(3)
- * Club domestic league appearances and goals as of 16 May 2026 ‡ National team caps and goals as of 17 November 2026

Nichita Moțpan (born 17 July 2001) is a Moldovan professional footballer who plays as an attacking midfielder for Russian First League club SKA-Khabarovsk and the Moldova national team.

== Club career ==
Moțpan was born in Bălți, Moldova. Between 2017 and 2020, he played youth football at Rubin Kazan and Zaria Bălți. He started his senior career with FC Bălți in July 2020, where he took part in the club's promotion from the 2020–21 Moldovan "A" Division, scoring 13 goals. In March 2021, he was close to moving to Polish side GKS Bełchatów, but the transfer fell through as FC Bălți and Moțpan could not agree on the financial terms with Bełchatów. On 1 July 2021, he made his Moldovan National Division debut in a 1–0 win against Sheriff Tiraspol. In June 2022, he moved to Israeli Premier League side Hapoel Haifa on a one-year loan. He returned to Bălți on 1 January 2023, as Hapoel opted not to extend the loan.

On 18 July 2023, Moțpan signed with the Russian Premier League club Fakel Voronezh. He left Fakel on 15 June 2026 as his contract expired.

On 20 July 2026, Moțpan moved to SKA-Khabarovsk in Russian First League.

== International career ==
He has represented Moldova at under-17 and under-21 level. On 10 June 2022, he made his senior international debut for the country in a 2022–23 UEFA Nations League D match against Latvia. He scored one of the goals in a 4–2 loss.

== Career statistics ==
=== Club ===
As of match played 16 May 2026

Appearances and goals by club, season and competition
Club	Season	League			Cup		Europe		Total	
Club	Season	Division	Apps	Goals	Apps	Goals	Apps	Goals	Apps	Goals
Bălți	2021–22	Moldovan Super Liga	23	7	1	0	—		24	7
Bălți	2022–23	Moldovan Super Liga	10	0	4	2	—		14	2
Bălți	Total		33	7	5	2	0	0	38	9
Hapoel Haifa (loan)	2022–23	Israeli Premier League	4	0	1	0	0	0	5	0
Fakel Voronezh	2023–24	Russian Premier League	28	1	5	0	—		33	1
Fakel Voronezh	2024–25	Russian Premier League	21	0	6	0	—		27	0
Fakel Voronezh	2025–26	Russian First League	24	0	3	0	—		27	0
Fakel Voronezh	Total		73	1	14	0	0	0	87	1
Career total			110	8	20	2	0	0	130	10

=== International ===
As of match played 16 November 2026

Appearances and goals by national team and year
National team	Year	Apps	Goals
Moldova	2022	6	2
Moldova	2023	10	0
Moldova	2024	8	1
Moldova	2025	7	0
Moldova	2026	6	0
Total		37	3

Scores and results list Moldova's goal tally first, score column indicates score after each Moțpan goal.

List of international goals scored by Nichita Moțpan
No.	Date	Venue	Opponent	Score	Result	Competition
1	10 June 2022	Zimbru Stadium, Chișinău, Moldova	Latvia	2–3	2–4	2022–23 UEFA Nations League D
2	16 November 2022	Zimbru Stadium, Chișinău, Moldova	Azerbaijan	1–2	1–2	Friendly
3	8 June 2024	Zimbru Stadium, Chișinău, Moldova	Cyprus	1–0	3–2	Friendly

== Personal life ==
Moțpan also holds Russian citizenship as Nikita Motspan (Russian: Никита Моцпан) and was registered by the Russian Premier League as a domestic player.
