= Liran Serdal =

Israeli footballer

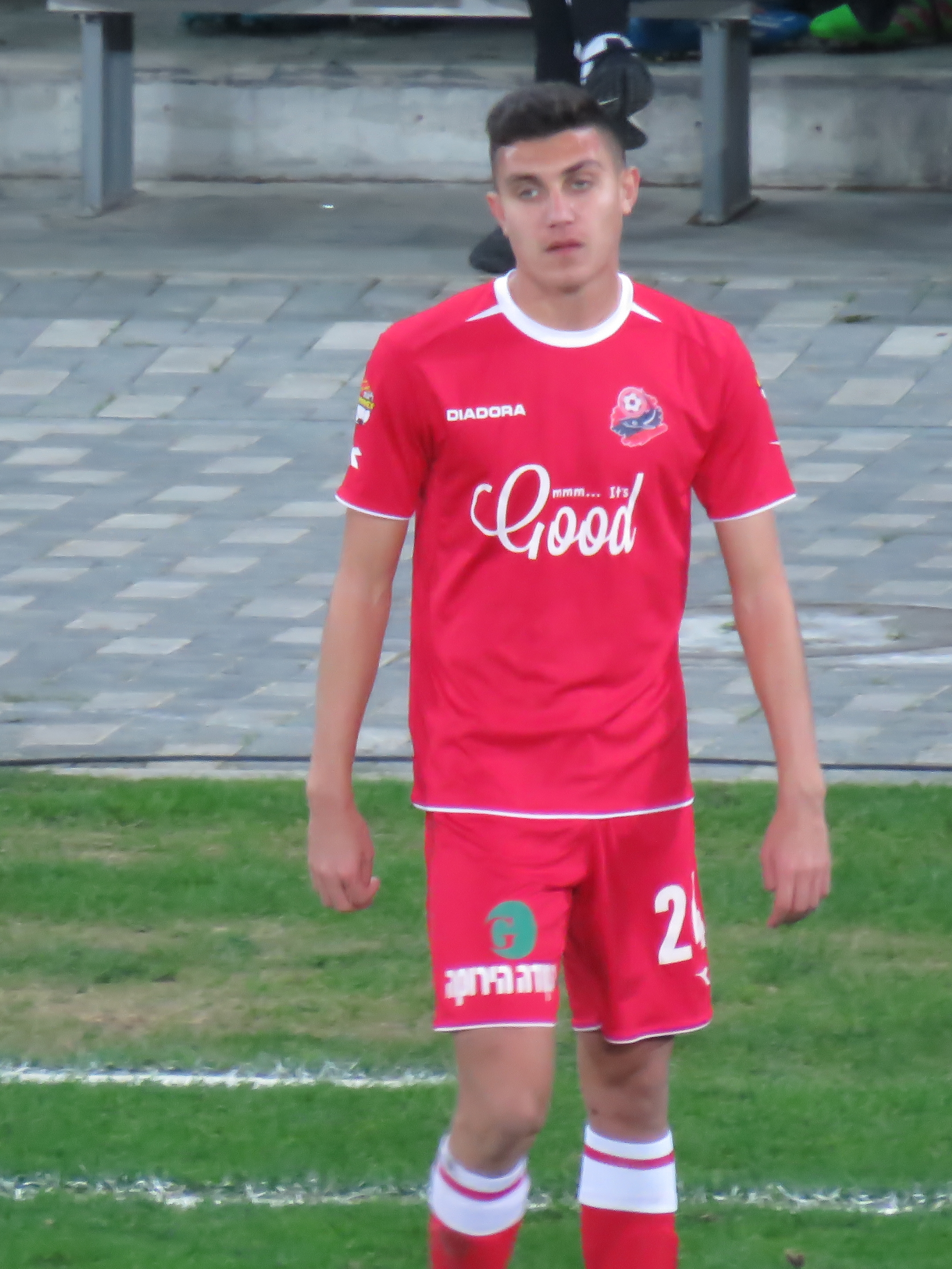

Personal information
- Full name: Liran Serdal
- Date of birth: July 2, 1994 (age 32)
- Place of birth: Kiryat Motzkin, Israel
- Position: Right back

Team information
- Current team: Hapoel Haifa
- Number: 24

Youth career
- 1999–2013: Hapoel Haifa

Senior career*
Years	Team	Apps	(Gls)
2013–	Hapoel Haifa	315	(19)

International career
2022	Israel	1	(0)
- * Club domestic league appearances and goals as of 24 June 2026

Liran Serdal (Hebrew: לירן סרדל; born July 2, 1994) is an Israeli footballer playing for Hapoel Haifa.
