= Amit Meir =

Israeli footballer

Personal information
- Full name: Amit Meir
- Date of birth: January 7, 2001 (age 25)
- Place of birth: Rishon LeZion, Israel
- Position: Defensive midfielder

Team information
- Current team: Hapoel Ramat Gan
- Number: 12

Youth career
- 2010–2014: Hapoel Rishon LeZion
- 2014–2020: Hapoel Tel Aviv

Senior career*
Years	Team	Apps	(Gls)
2020	Hapoel Tel Aviv	9	(0)
2020–2022	Maccabi Petah Tikva	44	(0)
2022–2023	Hapoel Haifa	6	(0)
2023	→ Maccabi Bnei Reineh	15	(1)
2023–2024	Maccabi Bnei Reineh	33	(0)
2024	Bnei Yehuda	0	(0)
2024–	Hapoel Ramat Gan	28	(1)

International career
2017–2018	Israel U17	11	(0)
2018	Israel U18	4	(1)
2019	Israel U19	7	(0)
- * Club domestic league appearances and goals as of 15 June 2025

Amit Meir (Hebrew: עמית מאיר; born 7 January 2001) is an Israeli professional footballer who plays as an attacking midfielder for Liga Leumit club Hapoel Ramat Gan.

== Career ==
Meir played in his childhood for Hapoel Rishon LeZion and later moved to Hapoel Tel Aviv. On 30 May 2020 Meir made his senior debut in the Israeli Premier League in the 2–1 win against Maccabi Haifa.
