= Konstantinos Sotiriou =

Cypriot footballer (born 1996)

Personal information
- Full name: Konstantinos Sotiriou
- Date of birth: 21 June 1996 (age 30)
- Place of birth: Nicosia, Cyprus
- Height: 1.90 m (6 ft 3 in)
- Position: Centre-back

Team information
- Current team: Korona Kielce
- Number: 44

Senior career*
Years	Team	Apps	(Gls)
2017–2018	Olympiakos Nicosia	34	(2)
2018–2019	Anorthosis	0	(0)
2019	→ Doxa Katokpias (loan)	11	(0)
2019–2021	Olympiakos Nicosia	36	(2)
2021–2024	AEL Limassol	27	(0)
2022–2023	→ Hapoel Haifa (loan)	29	(2)
2024–2025	Bnei Sakhnin	31	(2)
2025–	Korona Kielce	43	(6)

International career^{‡}
2012	Cyprus U17	2	(0)
2017–2018	Cyprus U21	9	(1)
2021–	Cyprus	13	(1)
- * Club domestic league appearances and goals as of 21:45, 25 September 2026 (UTC) ‡ National team caps and goals as of 19:12, 28 September 2026 (UTC)

Konstantinos Sotiriou (Greek: Κωνσταντίνος Σωτηρίου; born 21 June 1996) is a Cypriot professional footballer who plays as a centre-back for Ekstraklasa club Korona Kielce and the Cyprus national team.

== International career ==
He made his debut for Cyprus on 24 March 2021 in a World Cup qualifier against Slovakia.

== Career statistics ==
=== International ===
As of match played 28 September 2026

Appearances and goals by national team and year
National team	Year	Apps	Goals
Cyprus
Cyprus	2021	10	0
Cyprus	2022	0	0
Cyprus	2023	0	0
Cyprus	2024	0	0
Cyprus	2025	0	0
Cyprus	2026	3	1
Total		13	1

Scores and results list Cyprus' goal tally first, score column indicates score after each Sotiriou goal.

List of international goals scored by Konstantinos Sotiriou
No.	Date	Venue	Opponent	Score	Result	Competition
1	7 June 2026	Rheinpark Stadion, Vaduz, Liechtenstein	Liechtenstein	2–0	2–0	Friendly
