= Illya Markovskyi =

Ukrainian footballer

Illya Markovskyi Ілля Марковський
Personal information
- Full name: Illya Ernestovych Markovskyi
- Date of birth: 6 June 1997 (age 29)
- Place of birth: Odesa, Ukraine
- Height: 1.81 m (5 ft 11 in)
- Position: Forward

Team information
- Current team: Levadia
- Number: 97

Youth career
- 2015–2016: Chornomorets Odesa
- 2018: PAOK

Senior career*
Years	Team	Apps	(Gls)
2016–2018	Rudar Velenje	7	(0)
2018–2020	PAOK	0	(0)
2018–2019	→ Aiginiakos (loan)	11	(1)
2019	→ Trikala (loan)	13	(4)
2019–2020	→ Ethnikos Achna (loan)	19	(4)
2020–2021	Enosis Neon Paralimni	34	(2)
2021–2022	Rodos	13	(2)
2022	Hapoel Haifa	0	(0)
2023–	Levadia	17	(1)

International career^{‡}
2015	Ukraine U19	2	(0)
- * Club domestic league appearances and goals as of 22 November 2023 ‡ National team caps and goals as of 23 June 2018

Illya Ernestovych Markovskyi (Ukrainian: Ілля Ернестович Марковський; born 6 June 1997) is a Ukrainian professional footballer who plays as a forward for Meistriliiga club Levadia.

== Career ==
On 2 February 2018, the Ukrainian forward moved to Greece as a member of the youth team of PAOK. Before coming to Thessaloniki, he had already enjoyed his first professional experience in football, featuring for Slovenian side NK Rudar Velenje. The young forward played with PAOK U20s in the second half of the season, scoring 8 goals and serving 2 assists in 11 matches, and proved a vital cog of the outfit that won the Super League Souroti U20 title. He also trained numerous times with the senior team, making an impression and on 14 January 2018 extended his contract with the Superleague side for three years.

== Career statistics ==
=== Club ===
As of 1 June 2022

Club	Season	League			Cup		Other		Continental		Total	
Club	Season	Division	Apps	Goals	Apps	Goals	Apps	Goals	Apps	Goals	Apps	Goals
Rudar Velenje	2016–17	PrvaLiga	1	0	0	0	—		—		1	0
Rudar Velenje	2017–18	PrvaLiga	5	0	0	0	—		—		5	0
Rudar Velenje	Total		6	0	0	0	—		—		6	0
Aiginiakos (loan)	2018–19	Football League	12	1	1	0	—		—		13	1
Trikala (loan)	2018–19	Football League	13	4	0	0	—		—		13	4
Ethnikos Achna (loan)	2019–20	Cypriot First Division	19	4	3	1	—		—		22	5
Ethnikos Achna (loan)	2020–21	Cypriot First Division	37	2	1	0	—		—		38	2
Rodos	2021–22	Super League Greece 2	13	2	0	0	—		—		13	2
Hapoel Haifa	2022–23	Israeli Premier League	0	0	0	0	—		—		0	0
Career total			100	13	5	1	0	0	0	0	105	14
