= Eden Kartsev =

Israeli footballer (born 2000)

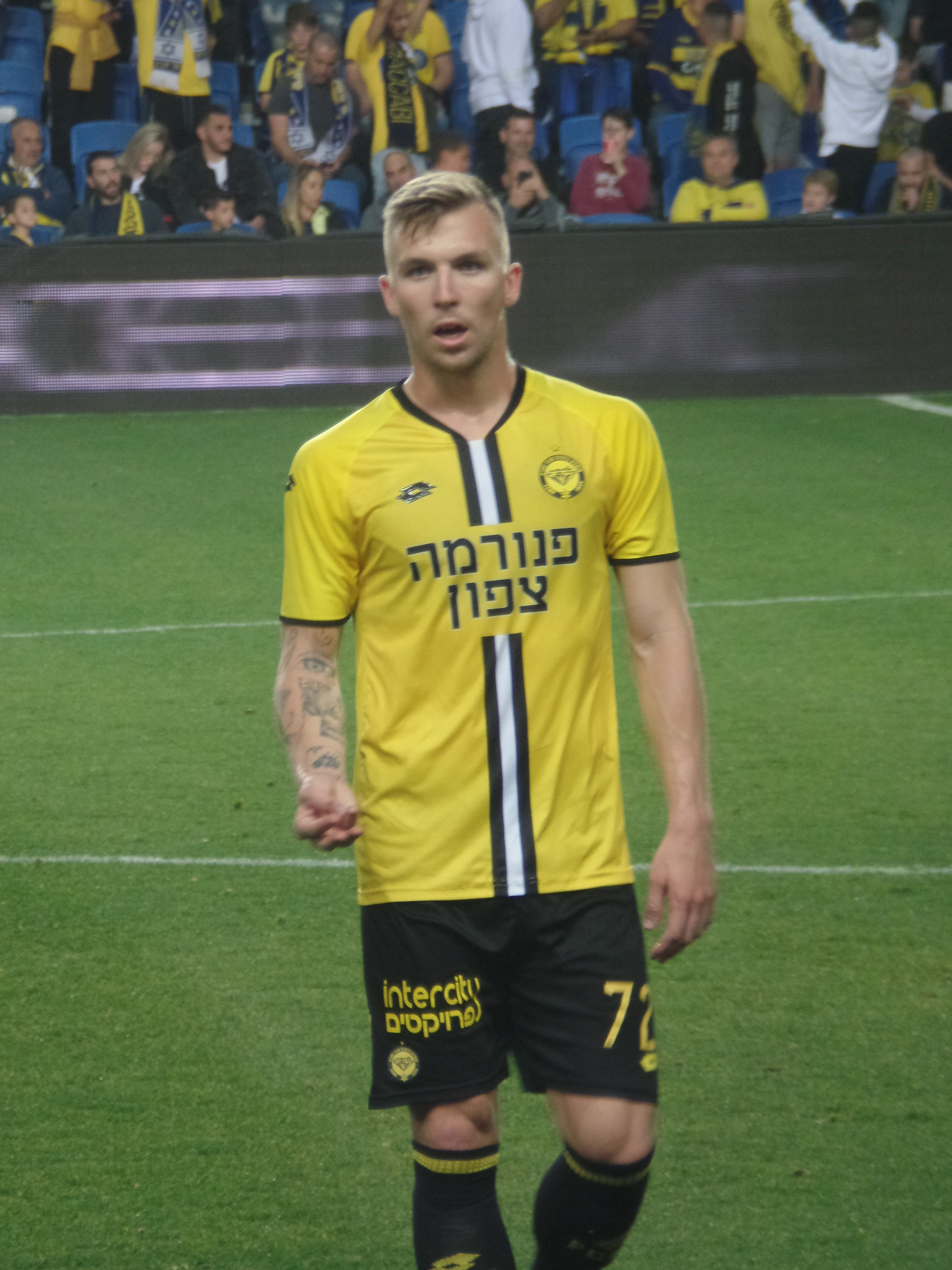
- Kartsev playing for Maccabi Netanya in 2022

Personal information
- Full name: Eden Vadimovich Kartsev
- Date of birth: 11 April 2000 (age 26)
- Place of birth: Afula, Israel
- Height: 1.86 m (6 ft 1 in)
- Position: Defensive midfielder

Team information
- Current team: Shenzhen Peng City
- Number: 36

Youth career
- 2008–2009: Maccabi Haifa
- 2009–2012: Hapoel Asi Gilboa
- 2012–2014: Maccabi Netanya
- 2014–2018: Maccabi Tel Aviv

Senior career*
Years	Team	Apps	(Gls)
2017–2021	Maccabi Tel Aviv	14	(1)
2018	→ Beitar Tel Aviv Ramla (loan)	12	(4)
2019	→ Hapoel Hadera (loan)	13	(2)
2019–2020	→ Ironi Kiryat Shmona (loan)	26	(1)
2021–2023	Maccabi Netanya	39	(4)
2023–2025	İstanbul Başakşehir	14	(0)
2024	→ Maccabi Tel Aviv (loan)	16	(0)
2024–2025	→ Shenzhen Peng City (loan)	25	(3)
2025-	Shenzhen Peng City	53	(5)

International career^{‡}
2015–2016	Israel U16	8	(5)
2015–2017	Israel U17	30	(4)
2016–2017	Israel U18	5	(1)
2017–2019	Israel U19	16	(5)
2018–2023	Israel U21	19	(2)
2020–	Israel	5	(0)
- * Club domestic league appearances and goals as of 8 November 2026 ‡ National team caps and goals as of 7 July 2024

Eden Vadimovich Kartsev (or Kartzev, Hebrew: עדן ואדימוביץ' קארצב, Belarusian: Эдэн Вадзімавіч Карцаў; born 11 April 2000) is an Israeli professional footballer who plays as a defensive midfielder for Chinese Super League club Shenzhen Peng City and the Israel national team.

He also holds a Belarusian passport.

== Club career ==
Kartsev made his professional debut for Maccabi Tel Aviv in Israel's Toto Cup Al on 12 August 2017, coming on as a substitute in the 72nd minute for Shlomi Yosef Azulay against fellow Israeli Premier League side Hapoel Ra'anana. He made his first appearance in the Israeli Premier League on 9 February 2018 while on loan at Beitar Tel Aviv Bat Yam, starting in the away match against Hapoel Nir Ramat HaSharon.

On 12 August 2022, Kartsev agreed on a transfer with Russian Premier League club Dynamo Moscow, on loan with an option to buy. On 23 August 2022, the deal between Dynamo Moscow and Maccabi Netanya was cancelled due to the sanctions imposed on the Russian banks after the 2022 Russian invasion of Ukraine, the Dynamo Moscow payment did not reach Maccabi Netanya's account by the deadline specified in the contract, and then Kartsev returned to Israeli Premier League club Maccabi Netanya.

On 30 January 2023, Kartsev signed a 4.5-year contract worth €2.25 million with Turkey's Süper Lig club İstanbul Başakşehir after the Turkish side agreed to pay Maccabi Netanya the €2.3 million transfer fee (highest transfer fee in the history of Maccabi Netanya).

In January 2024, Kartzev faced a disciplinary investigation by his club over a social media post. According to Turkish broadcaster TRT Haber, the player re-posted an image with the hashtag "#BringThemHomeNow" in apparent support of Israeli hostages being held in the Gaza Strip during the Gaza war. The Turkish Football Federation referred Kartsev to the Professional Football Disciplinary Board for potential breaches of Article 42 of the Football Disciplinary Instruction, citing "ideological propaganda", for which an eight-match ban could be imposed. While Kartzev was discussing leaving Başakşehir in a loan deal away from Turkey, an eight-match ban may apply worldwide.

On 18 January 2024, Kartsev returned to Maccabi Tel Aviv, on loan from İstanbul Başakşehir, until the end of the season, with an option to finalise it as a permanent transfer.

At July 2024, Kartsev was on loaned to Chinese Super League club Shenzhen Peng City.

On 28 June 2025, Kartsev transferred to Shenzhen Peng City permanently.

== International career ==
Kartsev made his senior international debut for Israel on 11 October 2020 in a 2020–21 UEFA Nations League B match, coming on as a 88th-minute substitute in the 1–2 home loss against the Czech Republic.

He also plays for Israel U21 since 2018.

== Personal life ==
Kartsev was born in Afula, Israel, to parents from Minsk, Belarus who immigrated to Israel in 1996. His father Vadim Kartsev is a former footballer who played in Belarus for FC Vitebsk and in Israel for Sektzia Ness Ziona and Hapoel Afula. He has an older sister who also resides in Israel. Kartsev and his family also speak fluent Russian.

== Career statistics ==
=== Club ===
As of match played 8 November 2026

Appearances and goals by club, season and competition
Club	Season	League			National cup (Note: Includes Israel State Cup, Turkish Cup, Chinese FA Cup)		League cup (Note: Includes Toto Cup)		Europe		Other		Total	
Club	Season	Division	Apps	Goals	Apps	Goals	Apps	Goals	Apps	Goals	Apps	Goals	Apps	Goals
Maccabi Tel Aviv	2017–18	Israeli Premier League	0	0	0	0	1	0	0	0	—		1	0
Maccabi Tel Aviv	2018–19	Israeli Premier League	0	0	1	0	0	0	0	0	—		1	0
Maccabi Tel Aviv	2020–21	Israeli Premier League	14	1	2	0	1	0	5 (Note: Two appearances and one goal in UEFA Champions League, three appearances in UEFA Europa League)	1	2 (Note: Appearances in Israel Super Cup)	0	24	2
Maccabi Tel Aviv	2021–22	Israeli Premier League	0	0	0	0	0	0	1 (Note: Appearance(s) in UEFA Europa Conference League)	0	0	0	1	0
Maccabi Tel Aviv	Total		14	1	3	0	2	0	6	1	2	0	27	2
Hapoel Hadera (loan)	2018–19	Israeli Premier League	13	2	3	0	0	0	—		—		16	2
Ironi Kiryat Shmona (loan)	2019–20	Israeli Premier League	26	1	1	0	0	0	—		—		27	1
Maccabi Netanya	2021–22	Israeli Premier League	22	2	1	0	1	0	—		—		24	2
Maccabi Netanya	2022–23	Israeli Premier League	17	2	2	0	2	0	2	0	—		23	2
Maccabi Netanya	Total		39	4	3	0	3	0	2	0	—		47	4
İstanbul Başakşehir	2022–23	Süper Lig	3	0	1	0	—		1	0	—		5	0
İstanbul Başakşehir	2023–24	Süper Lig	11	0	1	0	—		—		—		12	0
İstanbul Başakşehir	Total		14	0	2	0	—		1	0	—		17	0
Maccabi Tel Aviv (loan)	2023–24	Israeli Premier League	16	0	3	0	1	0	1	0	—		21	0
Shenzhen Peng City (loan)	2024	Chinese Super League	11	2	1	0	—		—		—		12	2
Shenzhen Peng City	2025	Chinese Super League	27	1	1	0	—		—		—		28	1
Shenzhen Peng City	2026	Chinese Super League	26	4	0	0	—		—		—		26	4
Shenzhen Peng City	Shenzhen total		64	7	2	0	—		—		—		66	7
Career total			178	15	16	0	6	0	10	1	2	0	212	16

=== International ===
As of match played 1 July 2023

Appearances and goals by national team and year
National team	Year	Apps (Note: Includes the UEFA Nations League, the FIFA World Cup qualification, and the UEFA Euro qualifying)	Goals
Israel	2020	1	0
Israel	2022	4	0
Total		5	0

== Honours ==
Maccabi Tel Aviv

- Israel State Cup: 2020–21
- Toto Cup: 2020–21
- Israel Super Cup: 2020

Maccabi Netanya

- Toto Cup: 2022–23
