= Oren Biton =

Israeli footballer

Personal information
- Full name: Oren Biton
- Date of birth: 16 June 1994 (age 32)
- Place of birth: Atlit, Israel
- Height: 1.84 m (6 ft 1/2 in)
- Position: Left-back

Team information
- Current team: Hapoel Haifa
- Number: 12

Youth career
- Hapoel Haifa

Senior career*
Years	Team	Apps	(Gls)
2014–2016	Hapoel Haifa	10	(0)
2015–2016	→ Hapoel Nazareth Illit (loan)	35	(2)
2016–2017	Ironi Kiryat Shmona	28	(0)
2017–2020	Hapoel Be'er Sheva	70	(1)
2020–2022	Beitar Jerusalem	46	(0)
2022–	Hapoel Haifa	68	(0)

International career
2016–2017	Israel U21	4	(1)
- * Club domestic league appearances and goals as of 24 June 2026

Oren Biton (or Bitton, Hebrew: אורן ביטון; born 16 June 1994) is an Israeli footballer who plays as a left-back for Hapoel Haifa.

== Early life ==
Bitton was born in Atlit, Israel, to a family of Sephardic Jewish descent.

== Career ==
On 10 May 2014, Biton made his debut for Hapoel Haifa, as a 85th-minute substitute for Or Ostvind in a 1–2 away loss against Maccabi Petah Tikva. In the 2014–15 season, Biton played only 9 game at the league.

Ahead of the 2015–16 season he was loaned to the Liga Leumit club Hapoel Nazareth Illit. On 11 March 2016, he received a red card against Maccabi Ahi Nazareth. On 11 April 2016, he scored his debut career goal in a 4–1 win against Hapoel Afula. Biton played 33 games and scored 2 goals.

On 15 June 2016, Biton signed for four years to Hapoel Ironi Kiryat Shmona. In Kiryat Shmona did his hacking and became important player at the club's line-up.

On 14 March 2017, he signed a contract for five years to Hapoel Be'er Sheva and will sign in 2017–18 season.

On 3 August 2020 signed in Beitar Jerusalem for couple of years.
