= Dino Štiglec =

Croatian footballer

Personal information
- Full name: Dino Štiglec
- Date of birth: 3 October 1990 (age 36)
- Place of birth: Zagreb, SR Croatia, SFR Yugoslavia
- Height: 1.90 m (6 ft 3 in)
- Position: Left-back

Team information
- Current team: Mladost Ždralovi
- Number: 90

Youth career
- 2001–2009: Zagreb

Senior career*
Years	Team	Apps	(Gls)
2009–2015	Zagreb	108	(3)
2010	→ Vrapče (loan)	11	(1)
2011	→ Lučko (loan)	10	(0)
2015–2017	Slaven Belupo	52	(1)
2017–2019	Olimpija Ljubljana	74	(3)
2019–2022	Śląsk Wrocław	82	(5)
2019	Śląsk Wrocław II	1	(0)
2022–2023	Hapoel Haifa	9	(0)
2023–2025	HNK Gorica	66	(2)
2025–	Mladost Ždralovi	14	(0)
- * Club domestic league appearances and goals as of 23:46, 12 December 2025 (UTC)

Dino Štiglec (born 3 October 1990) is a Croatian professional footballer who plays as a left-back for Druga NL club Mladost Ždralovi.

== Club career ==
A product of the NK Zagreb academy, Štiglec made his debut in the finish of the 2008–09 Prva HNL season, coming in for Igor Jugović in the 85th minute on 1 March 2009 in an away win against Croatia Sesvete. He was sent subsequently on loans to Vrapče in the Treća HNL and Lučko in the Druga HNL.

On 9 January 2017, Štiglec signed for the Slovenian champions Olimpija Ljubljana.

== Honours ==
Olimpija Ljubljana

- Slovenian PrvaLiga: 2017–18
- Slovenian Cup: 2017–18, 2018–19

Śląsk Wrocław II

- III liga, group III: 2019–20
