= Maccabi Bnei Reineh F.C. =

Maccabi Bnei Reineh
- Full name: Maccabi Bnei Reineh Football Club
- Founded: 2016
- Ground: Green Stadium, Nof HaGalil
- Capacity: 5,200
- Owner: Saeed Basoul
- Chairman: Saeed Basoul
- Head Coach: Lior Reuven
- League: Israeli Premier League
- 2025–26: Israeli Premier League, 14th of 14 (relegated)
- Website: maccabibneireineh.com
Home colours	Away colours	Third colours

Maccabi Bnei Reineh (Hebrew: מכבי בני ריינה; Arabic: مكابي ابناء الرينة) is an Israeli football club based in Reineh. The club played its home matches at the Municipal Stadium. They were promoted to play with Bnei Sakhnin in the Israeli Premier League as its second Arab-Israeli football club for the 2022–23 season.

== History ==
A chart showing the progress of Maccabi Bnei Reineh through the Israeli football league system, from 2005–06 to the present

In the 1990s and 2000s, Maccabi Bnei Reineh played in Liga Gimel and didn't achieve significant achievements. In 2008 the club was folded. In 2016, the club refounded by a local businessman named Saeed Basul, and at the end of the 2016–17 season, the team finished in first place in Liga Gimel Jezreel, and promoted to Liga Bet.

At 2019–20 Israel State Cup qualified to the round of 16, there loss 1–3 to Beitar Jerusalem. At the end of the season promoted to Liga Alef. On 23 September 2020, the club IFA's tribunal ruled, Reineh will play in the next season in Liga Alef, after the previous season stopped due to the COVID-19 epidemic.

On 6 May 2022 the club promoted to the Israeli Premier League at the first time in the history of the team after 1–0 win against Hapoel Umm al-Fahm. In doing so, the team completed three consecutive league promotions in three seasons.

On 3 October 2022 the club achieved his first win in the Israeli Premier League after the 3–2 win against Beitar Jerusalem. In this season, it was the only club who neither lost nor conceded a goal from the champions Maccabi Haifa.

== Stadium ==
Until 2021, Reineh played in the Municipal Stadium in Reineh. After the club was promoted to Liga Leumit, it moved to Green Stadium, Nof HaGalil because the Municipal Stadium wasn't approved to host matches in Liga Leumit. The stadium us still used by the club for its home matches in the Israeli Premier League.

== Current squad ==
As of 31 July 2026

No.	Pos.	Nation	Player
1	GK	ISR	Sagi Pinhas
2	DF	ISR	Taher Thana
3	DF	ISR	Mor Barami
4	DF	ISR	Matan Gosha
5	DF	ISR	Ayid Habshi
6	MF	ISR	Ohad Hazut
7	FW	ROU	Antonio Sefer
8	MF	NGR	Muhammed Usman Edu
9	FW	ISR	Asil Kna'ani
10	MF	ISR	Nowaf Bazea
11	FW	ISR	Yuval Sasson
12	DF	ISR	Yehonatan Tzaig
14	DF	PLE	Abdallah Jaber

No.	Pos.	Nation	Player
15	FW	ISR	Ohad Barzilay
16	FW	ISR	Mohammed Shaker
18	FW	ISR	Mohammed Awara Akram
19	DF	ISR	Nir Guetta
21	FW	ISR	Roei Zikri
23	MF	ISR	Iham Matar
30	DF	ISR	Majd Khoury
33	MF	ISR	Ali Ibrahim
44	MF	ISR	Mahmoud Jabarin
57	MF	CIV	Gontie Diomandé (on loan from Maccabi Netanya)
77	FW	ISR	Idan Goren
88	DF	ISR	Omri Amer
98	GK	ISR	Roy Sason (on loan from Beitar Jerusalem)
—	MF	ISR	Mustapha Sheikh Yousef

== Honours ==
- Liga Leumit
  - Champions (1): 2021–22

== Coaching staff ==
As of 26 December 2025

Position	Staff
Manager	(Israel) Lior Reuven
Assistant Manager	(Israel) Fadi Abu Salih
Goalkeeper Coach	(Israel) Ihab El-Ghanim
Fitness Coach	(Israel) Ayub Khalaila
Physiotherapist	(Israel) Razzaq Khamis
Masseur	(Israel) Mansour Mohammed
