= 2019–20 Hapoel Haifa F.C. season =

Hapoel Haifa
2019–20 season
- Owner: Yoav Katz
- Chairman: Yoav Katz
- Manager: Haim Silvas
- Stadium: Sammy Ofer
- Ligat Ha'Al: 6th
- State Cup: Quarter final
- Toto Cup: 12th
- Top goalscorer: League: Ness Zamir (7); All: Ness Zamir (10)
- Biggest win: 5 - 1 (vs Hapoel Bnei Lod, 20 December 2019)
- Biggest defeat: 1 - 4 (vs Beitar Jerusalem, 5 October 2019); 1 - 4 (vs Maccabi Haifa, 1 July 2020)
Home colours	Away colours	Third colours

Hapoel Haifa Football Club is an Israeli football club located in Haifa. During the 2019–20 campaign, the club has competed in the Israeli Premier League, State Cup and Toto Cup.

== Club ==
=== Kits ===
- Provider: Diadora
- Main Sponsor: Moked Hat'ama
- Secondary Sponsor: Garden Events

Home	Away	3rd	GK 1	GK 2

== First team ==
No.	Pos.	Nation	Player
1	GK	ISR	Ran Kadoch
2	DF	ISR	Miki Siroshtein
4	DF	ISR	Dor Malul (Vice-Captain)
5	DF	ISR	Ofek Fishler
6	MF	ISR	Gal Arel
7	MF	FRA	Kevin Tapoko
8	MF	ISR	Gidi Kanyuk
9	FW	ISR	Eden Ben Basat
10	FW	ISR	Mahran Lala
11	MF	ISR	Ness Zamir
12	FW	SVK	Jakub Sylvestr
13	GK	BIH	Jasmin Burić
14	MF	ISR	Gil Vermouth (Captain)
15	DF	ISR	Eli Balilty
16	MF	ISR	Omer Abadi
17	FW	ISR	Ofir Mizrahi

No.	Pos.	Nation	Player
18	MF	ISR	Tomer Altman
20	MF	ISR	Sa'ar Fadida
21	MF	ISR	Afik Katan
22	GK	ISR	Oren Tal
23	MF	ISR	Yarin Serdal
24	DF	ISR	Liran Serdal
25	GK	ISR	Amit Suari
26	DF	ISR	Guy Mishpati
27	MF	ISR	Snir Talias
28	FW	ISR	Dudu Alterovich
32	DF	ISR	Ben Vehava
34	DF	ISR	Yarin Cohen
36	DF	SRB	Nikola Gulan
55	DF	ISR	Nisso Kapiloto
77	FW	ISR	Almog Buzaglo

== Transfers ==
=== Summer ===
In:

No.	Pos.	Nation	Player
—	DF	ISR	Ben Vehava (from Hapoel Ra'anana)
—	GK	BIH	Jasmin Burić (from (Poland) Lech Poznań)
—	FW	ISR	Dudu Alterovich (came from the youth group)
—	MF	ISR	Roei Shukrani (loan return from Hapoel Acre)
—	DF	ISR	Ofek Fishler (loan return from Hapoel Acre)
—	FW	ISR	Aner Shechter (loan return from Hapoel Afula)
—	GK	ISR	Rotem Fadida (loan return from Maccabi Tzur Shalom)
—	FW	ISR	Sa'ar Fadida (loan return from Hapoel Rishon LeZion)
—	MF	ISR	Ohad Elbilia (loan return from Maccabi Tzur Shalom)
—	MF	FRA	Kevin Tapoko (on loan from Hapoel Be'er Sheva)
—	DF	ISR	Eli Balilty (from Hapoel Nazareth Illit)
—	FW	ISR	Mahran Lala (returning from suspension)
—	FW	ISR	Eden Ben Basat (from Hapoel Be'er Sheva)
—	FW	GUY	Emery Welshman (from (United States) Cincinnati)
—	MF	GBS	Francisco Júnior (from (Denmark) Vendsyssel FF)
—	MF	ISR	Omer Abadi (came from the youth group)
—	GK	ISR	Oren Tal (came from the youth group)
—	DF	SRB	Nikola Gulan (from (Belgium) Royal Excel Mouscron)
—	MF	ISR	Gidi Kanyuk (from (Uzbekistan) Pakhtakor Tashkent)

Out:

No.	Pos.	Nation	Player
—	GK	LTU	Ernestas Šetkus (to Beitar Jerusalem)
—	FW	ISR	Matan Hozez (loan return to Maccabi Tel Aviv)
—	MF	ISR	Shlomi Azulay (loan return to Maccabi Haifa)
—	FW	ISR	Ben Azubel (loan return to Hapoel Acre)
—	DF	ISR	Sean Goldberg (to Hapoel Be'er Sheva)
—	DF	MKD	Risto Mitrevski (to (Romania) Sepsi OSK Sfântu Gheorghe)
—	FW	MDA	Radu Gînsari (to (Russia) Krylia Sovetov Samara)
—	DF	SWE	Rasmus Sjöstedt (free agent)
—	FW	ISR	Dudu Biton (free agent)
—	MF	ISR	Lior Berkovic (free agent)
—	DF	ISR	Ofek Fishler (on loan to Hapoel Nof HaGalil)
—	DF	ROU	Gabriel Tamaș (to (Romania) Astra Giurgiu)
—	GK	ISR	Tal Hadar (on loan to Maccabi Kiryat Ata)
—	MF	ISR	Roei Shukrani (to Hapoel Nof HaGalil)
—	FW	ISR	Idan Shemesh (to Hapoel Ra'anana)
—	MF	ISR	Ohad Elbilia (on loan to Hapoel Acre)
—	DF	ISR	Hen Dilmoni (free agent)
—	MF	ISR	Guy Hadida (free agent)

=== Winter ===
In:

No.	Pos.	Nation	Player
—	DF	ISR	Yarin Cohen (came from the youth group)
—	DF	ISR	Miki Siroshtein (from (Thailand) Suphanburi)
—	DF	ISR	Ofek Fishler (loan return from Hapoel Nof HaGalil)
—	FW	SVK	Jakub Sylvestr (from F.C. Ashdod)
—	MF	ISR	Tomer Altman (on loan from Maccabi Tel Aviv)
—	FW	ISR	Ofir Mizrahi (from Sektzia Nes Tziona)

Out:

No.	Pos.	Nation	Player
—	GK	ISR	Rotem Fadida (free agent)
—	FW	GUY	Emery Welshman (to Bnei Sakhnin)
—	FW	ISR	Aner Shechter (on loan to Hapoel Ashkelon)

== Pre-season and friendlies ==
Win Draw Loss

10 July 2019	Hapoel Ra'anana	0 - 1	Hapoel Haifa	Ra'anana
18:00		Report	Buzaglo 42'	Stadium: Karnei; Attendance: 100

12 July 2019	Hapoel Haifa	2 - 0	Hapoel Acre	Haifa
10:00	Zamir 65'; Shechter 80'	Report		Stadium: Beit Nagler; Attendance: 100

17 July 2019 Training Camp	Hapoel Haifa (Israel)	3 - 1	(Romania) Gloria Buzău	Bucharest, Romania
18:00	Ben Basat 30'; Lala 77', 79'	Report	Chipirliu 51'	Stadium: Buzău

20 July 2019 Training Camp	Hapoel Haifa (Israel)	2 - 0	(Romania) Mioveni	Bucharest, Romania
18:00	Buzaglo 63'; Hadida 82'	Report		Stadium: Constantin balalau

22 July 2019 Training Camp	Hapoel Haifa (Israel)	3 - 3	(Romania) Rapid București	Bucharest, Romania
18:00	Buzaglo 58'; Shemesh 76'; Lala 77'	Report	Drăghiceanu 19'; Mallo 27'; Vlada 85' (pen.)	Stadium: Regie

21 November 2019	Bnei Sakhnin	3 - 0	Hapoel Haifa	Sakhnin
10:30				Stadium: Doha

15 May 2020	Hapoel Haifa	3 - 0	Hapoel Hadera	Haifa
10:30	Kanyuk 28'; Mizrahi 62', 89'	Report		Stadium: Beit Nagler

19 May 2020	Hapoel Haifa	2 - 1	Hapoel Acre	Haifa
18:00	Lala 75'; Arel 85' (pen.)	Report	Biton 15'	Stadium: Beit Nagler

22 May 2020	Hapoel Haifa	2 - 1	Hapoel Kfar Saba	Haifa
10:00	Siroshtein 43'; Lala 86'	Report	Kizito 20'	Stadium: Beit Nagler

== Competitions ==
=== Overview ===
Competition	First match	Last match	Starting round	Final position	Record							
Competition	First match	Last match	Starting round	Final position	Pld	W	D	L	GF	GA	GD	Win %
Ligat Ha'Al	25 August 2019	7 July 2020	Matchday 1	6th	36	12	11	13	39	46	−7	33.33
State Cup	20 December 2019	3 March 2020	Eighth Round	Quarter final	3	2	0	1	6	3	+3	66.67
Toto Cup	27 July 2019	17 August 2019	Group stage	12th	5	1	1	3	6	7	−1	20.00
Total					44	15	12	17	51	56	−5	34.09

Last updated: 12 May 2019.
Source: Competitions

== Ligat Ha'Al ==
=== Results summary ===
Overall								Home						Away					
Pld	W	D	L	GF	GA	GD	Pts	W	D	L	GF	GA	GD	W	D	L	GF	GA	GD
36	12	11	13	39	46	−7	47	6	5	7	23	26	−3	6	6	6	16	20	−4

Last updated: 12 May 2019.

=== Results by matchday ===
Matchday	1	2	3	4	5	6	7	8	9	10	11	12	13	14	15	16	17	18	19	20	21	22	23	24	25	26	27	28	29	30	31	32	33	34	35	36
Ground	A	H	A	H	A	H	A	H	H	A	H	A	H	H	A	H	A	H	A	H	A	A	H	A	H	A	A	H	A	H	A	H	H	H	A	A
Result	W	D	W	L	D	L	D	W	W	L	L	W	W	L	L	L	L	W	L	D	W	W	D	D	W	D	L	D	D	W	D	L	D	L	L	W
Position	4	7	2	6	6	7	7	6	5	6	7	6	5	5	5	6	8	6	8	8	7	6	6	7	5	6	6	6	6	6	6	6	6	6	6	6

Updated to match(es) played on 12 May 2019. Source:
A = Away; H = Home; W = Win; D = Draw; L = Loss

=== Regular season ===
Win Draw Loss

25 August 2019 Match 1	Hapoel Kfar Saba	0 - 1	Hapoel Haifa	Petah Tikva
19:00	Atanda (yellow card) 16'; Traorè (yellow card) 37'; Azaria (yellow card) 49'; Solomon (yellow card) 62'	Report	Tapoko (yellow card) 8'; Kapiloto (yellow card) 45'; Zamir (yellow card) 63'; Balilty 74'	Stadium: HaMoshava; Attendance: 1,900; Referee: Idan Leiba

31 August 2019 Match 2	Hapoel Haifa	0 - 0	Maccabi Haifa	Haifa
20:30	Júnior (yellow card) 26'; Burić (yellow card) 43'; Serdal (yellow card) 50'	Report	Rukavytsya (yellow card) 43'; Ashkenazi (yellow card) 47'; Lavi (yellow card) 50'; Habshi (yellow card) 71'	Stadium: Sammy Ofer; Attendance: 23,000; Referee: Ziv Adler

16 September 2019 Match 3	Beitar Jerusalem	0 - 2	Hapoel Haifa	Jerusalem
20:15	García (yellow card) 72'	Report	Konstantini 13' (o.g.); Ben Basat (yellow card) 68'; Gulan (yellow card) 76'; Kanyuk 79'	Stadium: Teddy; Attendance: 11,000; Referee: Daniel Bar Natan

22 September 2019 Match 4	Hapoel Haifa	1 - 2	Hapoel Hadera	Haifa
20:15	Kapiloto (yellow card) 33'; Kanyuk (yellow card) 35' (goal) 78'; Tapoko (yellow card) 47'; Burić (yellow card) 90+2'	Report	Abu Fani (yellow card) 30'; Peretz 39' (yellow card) 83'; Zikri 58'; Zalka (yellow card) 81'; Hassan (yellow card) 84'; Lúcio (yellow card) 90'; Ejide (yellow card) 90+1'	Stadium: Sammy Ofer; Attendance: 3,200; Referee: Eitan Shmuelevich

28 September 2019 Match 5	F.C. Ashdod	1 - 1	Hapoel Haifa	Ashdod
18:00	Gozlan 78'; Gordana (yellow card) 88'; Yehezkel (yellow card) 88'	Report	Lala 47'; Kapiloto (yellow card) 60'; Júnior (yellow card) 88'; Vehava (yellow card) 90+1'	Stadium: Yud-Alef; Attendance: 1,480; Referee: Eli Hachmon

5 October 2019 Match 6	Hapoel Haifa	0 - 3	Hapoel Be'er Sheva	Haifa
20:30	Serdal (yellow card) 50'; Malul (yellow card) 87'	Report	Keltjens (yellow card) 38'; Shamir 45' (yellow card) 54'; Sahar 52'; Hasselbaink 74'; Josué (yellow card) 87'	Stadium: Sammy Ofer; Attendance: 4,600; Referee: Shalom Ben Avraham

21 October 2019 Match 7	Hapoel Ra'anana	0 - 0	Hapoel Haifa	Petah Tikva
18:00	Yadin (yellow card) 20'; Ganem (yellow card) 48'; Ansah (yellow card) 52'; Nimni (yellow card) 52'	Report	Arel (yellow card) 4'; Kanyuk (yellow card) 56'; Vehava (yellow card) 68'	Stadium: HaMoshava; Attendance: 1,200; Referee: Na'al Oda

26 October 2019 Match 8	Hapoel Haifa	3 - 0	Hapoel Tel Aviv	Haifa
16:00	Zamir 21' (yellow card) 22'; Vehava (red card) 35'; Júnior (yellow card) 39'; Ben Basat 44' (pen.); Kanyuk (yellow card) 72'; Arel 79' (pen.)	Report	Lax (red card) 78'; Spirovski (yellow card) 89'; Peersman (yellow card) 90'	Stadium: Sammy Ofer; Attendance: 6,102; Referee: Liran Liani

2 November 2019 Match 9	Hapoel Haifa	2 - 1	Hapoel Ironi Kiryat Shmona	Haifa
15:00	Zamir 9', 32'; Júnior (yellow card) 77'	Report	Diniz (yellow card) 34'; Lakou 45'; Karzev (yellow card) 59'; Shaker (yellow card) 69'; Abuhatzira (yellow card) 90+4'	Stadium: Sammy Ofer; Attendance: 3,270; Referee: Orel Greenfeld

9 November 2019 Match 10	Maccabi Tel Aviv	3 - 0	Hapoel Haifa	Tel Aviv
19:50	Cohen 26' (yellow card) 29' (penalty missed) 65; Micha 53'; Saborit (yellow card) 87'; Shechter 90+4'	Report	Serdal (yellow card) 59'; Vehava (yellow card) 70'; Kanyuk (yellow card) 90+1'	Stadium: Bloomfield; Attendance: 23,125; Referee: Eli Hachmon

30 November 2019 Match 11	Hapoel Haifa	1 - 3	Maccabi Netanyaa	Haifa
15:00	Júnior (yellow card) 10'; Zamir 66'; Vehava (yellow card) 82'	Report	Avraham (yellow card) 13' (yellow-red card) 45+2'; Kanichowsky 34'; Bećiraj 76', 90+3'; Cohen (yellow card) 82'; Finish (yellow card) 90+5'	Stadium: Sammy Ofer; Attendance: 4,600; Referee: Erez Papir

4 December 2019 Match 12	Sektzia Nes Tziona	1 - 2	Hapoel Haifa	Petah Tikva
19:45	Stein 9'; Etou (red card) 45+3'	Report	Arel 45+4' (pen.); Ben Basat 90+7' (pen.)	Stadium: HaMoshava; Attendance: 493; Referee: Ziv Adler

7 December 2019 Match 13	Hapoel Haifa	3 - 0	Bnei Yehuda Tel Aviv	Haifa
17:30	Kapiloto 45+1'; Ben Basat 47'; Arel 74' (pen.); Fadida (yellow card) 90+3'	Report	Baltaxa (yellow card) 34'; Allyson (yellow card) 72'; Ljujić (yellow card) 90+2'	Stadium: Sammy Ofer; Attendance: 3,050; Referee: Aviad Shiluach

14 December 2019 Match 14	Hapoel Haifa	0 - 2	Hapoel Kfar Saba	Haifa
18:30	Tapoko (yellow card) 39'; Arel (yellow card) 49'; Ben Basat (yellow card) 83'	Report	Yousef 28'; Kuku (penalty missed) 41; Traorè 46'; Gateon (yellow card) 75'; Israeli (yellow card) 78'	Stadium: Sammy Ofer; Attendance: 3,030; Referee: Na'al Oda

24 December 2019 Match 15	Maccabi Haifa	3 - 0	Hapoel Haifa	Haifa
20:15	Ashkenazi 46'; Rukavytsya 53', 56'; Lavi (yellow card) 60'; Shua (yellow card) 87'	Report	Serdal (yellow card) 75'	Stadium: Sammy Ofer; Attendance: 28,177; Referee: Liran Liany

30 December 2019 Match 16	Hapoel Haifa	1 - 4	Beitar Jerusalem	Haifa
20:15	Kapiloto (yellow card) 4'; Arel 47' (pen.); Fadida (yellow card) 68'	Report	Azulay 6'; Kinda 19'; Varenne 21'; Mohamed (yellow card) 35'; Einbinder (yellow card) 73'; Plumain 75'; Ben Haim (yellow card) 82'	Stadium: Sammy Ofer; Attendance: 6,156; Referee: David Fuxman

4 January 2020 Match 17	Hapoel Hadera	2 - 0	Hapoel Haifa	Netanya
18:30	Lúcio 50'; Rabah (yellow card) 55'; Abu Fani (yellow card) 57' (goal) 73'	Report	Zamir (yellow card) 45'; Tapoko (yellow card) 63'	Stadium: Netanya; Attendance: 766; Referee: Eitan Shmuelevich

11 January 2020 Match 18	Hapoel Haifa	1 - 0	F.C. Ashdod	Haifa
15:00	Fadida (yellow card) 34' (goal) 55'	Report	Abu Akel (yellow card) 27'; Asefa (yellow card) 65'	Stadium: Sammy Ofer; Attendance: 1908; Referee: Sagi Berman

20 January 2020 Match 19	Hapoel Be'er Sheva	1 - 0	Hapoel Haifa	Be'er Sheva
20:00	Bitton (yellow card) 40'; Keltjens (yellow card) 60'; Safouri 73'	Report	Júnior (yellow card) 47'; Fadida (yellow card) 55'	Stadium: Turner; Attendance: 8,651; Referee: Igal Farid

25 January 2020 Match 20	Hapoel Haifa	2 - 2	Hapoel Ra'anana	Haifa
18:30	Malul (yellow card) 10'; Ben Basat (yellow card) 35'; Vermouth (yellow card) 43'; Mishpati 61'; Sylvestr 71'; Fadida (yellow card) 87'; Júnior (yellow card) 90'	Report	Tomer 33' (yellow card) 86'; Levy 44'; Ansah (yellow card) 54'	Stadium: Sammy Ofer; Attendance: 1,920; Referee: Liran Liani

1 February 2020 Match 21	Hapoel Tel Aviv	0 - 1	Hapoel Haifa	Tel Aviv
19:50	Peersman (yellow card) 61'; Gruper (yellow card) 81'	Report	Sylvestr 12'; Kanyuk (yellow card) 37'; Gulan (yellow card) 67'	Stadium: Bloomfield; Attendance: 10,346; Referee: Ziv Adler

4 February 2020 Match 22	Hapoel Ironi Kiryat Shmona	1 - 2	Hapoel Haifa	Kiryat Shmona
19:00	Shaker 66'; Scheimann (yellow card) 79'; Broun (yellow card) 89'	Report	Mishpati (yellow card) 50' (goal) 60'; Altman (yellow card) 54'; Ben Basat 67'	Stadium: Kiryat Shmona Municipal; Attendance: 600; Referee: Erez Papir

8 February 2020 Match 23	Hapoel Haifa	1 - 1	Maccabi Tel Aviv	Haifa
19:50	Altman (yellow card) 48'; Tapoko (yellow card) 56'; Mizrahi (yellow card) 62'; Zamir 90+3'	Report	Shechter 37'	Stadium: Sammy Ofer; Attendance: 4,445; Referee: Eli Hachmon

15 February 2020 Match 24	Maccabi Netanya	0 - 0	Hapoel Haifa	Netanya
15:00	Jaber (yellow card) 26'; Šehović (yellow card) 65'	Report	Siroshtein (yellow card) 33'; Mishpati (yellow card) 54'; Altman (yellow card) 61'; Malul (yellow card) 76'; Mizrahi (yellow card) 85'; Zamir (yellow card) 89'	Stadium: Netanya; Attendance: 7,579; Referee: Shalom Ben Avraham

22 February 2020 Match 25	Hapoel Haifa	2 - 0	Sektzia Nes Tziona	Haifa
18:30	Tapoko 18' (yellow card) 52'; Fadida 45+7'	Report	Nachmias (yellow card) 90+2'	Stadium: Sammy Ofer; Attendance: 2,711; Referee: Gal Leivovich

29 February 2020 Match 26	Bnei Yehuda Tel Aviv	0 - 0	Hapoel Haifa	Petah Tikva
19:50	Allyson (yellow card) 47'	Report	Malul (yellow card) 15'; Fadida (yellow card) 45'; Kanyuk (yellow card) 57'; Serdal (yellow card) 69'; Ben Basat (yellow card) 80'; Burić (yellow card) 90+4'	Stadium: HaMoshava; Attendance: 3,000; Referee: Igal Farid

==== Regular season table ====
Pos	Team	Pld	W	D	L	GF	GA	GD	Pts	Qualification or relegation
4	Hapoel Be'er Sheva	26	13	5	8	33	23	+10	44	Qualification for the Championship round
5	Hapoel Tel Aviv	26	11	5	10	24	36	−12	38	Qualification for the Championship round
6	Hapoel Haifa	26	10	7	9	26	30	−4	37	Qualification for the Championship round
7	Bnei Yehuda	26	9	7	10	23	26	−3	34	Qualification for the Relegation round
8	Hapoel Hadera	26	9	7	10	24	28	−4	34	Qualification for the Relegation round

Updated to match(es) played on unknown. Source: Soccerway
Rules for classification: 1) Points; 2) Goal difference; 3) Matches won; 4) Goals scored; 5) Head-to-head points; 6) Head-to-head goal difference; 7) Head-to-head goals scored; 8) Play-off.

==== Results overview ====
Win Draw Loss

Opposition	Home score	Away score
Beitar Jerusalem	1 - 4	2 - 0
Bnei Yehuda Tel Aviv	3 - 0	0 - 0
F.C. Ashdod	1 - 0	1 - 1
Hapoel Be'er Sheva	0 - 3	0 - 1
Hapoel Hadera	1 - 2	0 - 2
Hapoel Ironi Kiryat Shmona	2 - 1	2 - 1
Hapoel Kfar Saba	0 - 2	1 - 0
Hapoel Ra'anana	2 - 2	0 - 0
Hapoel Tel Aviv	3 - 0	1 - 0
Maccabi Haifa	0 - 0	0 - 3
Maccabi Netanya	1 - 3	0 - 0
Maccabi Tel Aviv	1 - 1	0 - 3
Sektzia Nes Tziona	2 - 0	2 - 1

=== Play-off ===
30 May 2020 Match 27	Maccabi Tel Aviv	2 - 0	Hapoel Haifa	Tel Aviv
20:00	Hozez 45'; Shechter 55'	Report	Siroshtein (yellow card) 32'; Kapiloto (yellow card) 68'; Júnior (yellow card) 82'	Stadium: Bloomfield; Referee: Orel Grinfeld

3 June 2020 Match 28	Hapoel Haifa	1 - 1	Hapoel Be'er Sheva	Haifa
20:30	Zamir 69'; Arel (yellow card) 87'	Report	Josué 81'; Zrihan (yellow card) 89'	Stadium: Sammy Ofer; Referee: Idan Leiba

7 June 2020 Match 29	Maccabi Haifa	2 - 2	Hapoel Haifa	Haifa
20:45	Rukavytsya 26'; Awaed 85' (yellow card) 90'; Mabouka (yellow card) 90+3'	Report	Mishpati (yellow card) 45+3'; Serdal 54'; Zamir (yellow card) 69'; Fadida (yellow card) 72'; Arel 90+6' (pen.)	Stadium: Sammy Ofer; Referee: Eitan Shemeulevitch

14 June 2020 Match 30	Hapoel Haifa	4 - 0	Hapoel Tel Aviv	Haifa
20:15	Fadida (yellow card) 9'; Kanyuk 16' (pen.), 55'; Zamir (yellow card) 36' (goal) 65'; Arel 64' (pen.)	Report	Dgani (yellow card) 16'; Boateng (yellow card) 35'; Meir (yellow card) 90'	Stadium: Sammy Ofer; Referee: Na'al Oda

17 June 2020 Match 31	Beitar Jerusalem	1 - 1	Hapoel Haifa	Jerusalem
20:15	Grechkin (yellow card) 17'; Ben Haim (yellow card) 30'; Plumain 37' (pen.); Conte (yellow card) 43'; Vered (yellow card) 59'	Report	Fadida (yellow card) 36'; Kanyuk (yellow card) 39'; Buzaglo 79'; Serdal (yellow card) 86'	Stadium: Teddy; Referee: Snir Levi

23 June 2020 Match 32	Hapoel Haifa	0 - 3	Maccabi Tel Aviv	Haifa
20:50	Burić (yellow card) 18'; Zamir (yellow card) 19'; Balilty (yellow card) 87'	Report	Piven 18'; Almog 44'; Davidzada (yellow card) 71'; Cohen 80' (pen.)	Stadium: Sammy Ofer; Referee: Liran Liani

28 June 2020 Match 33	Hapoel Haifa	0 - 0	Beitar Jerusalem	Haifa
20:45	Arel (yellow card) 1'; Tapoko (yellow card) 86'	Report	Mohamed (yellow card) 41'	Stadium: Sammy Ofer; Referee: Aviad Shiloah

1 July 2020 Match 34	Hapoel Haifa	1 - 4	Maccabi Haifa	Haifa
20:30	Arel (yellow card) 45+2'; Sylvestr 70'	Report	Rukavytsya 4' 23'; Sallalich 9' 26'	Stadium: Sammy Ofer; Referee: Idan Leiba

4 July 2020 Match 35	Hapoel Be'er Sheva	3 - 1	Hapoel Haifa	Ashdod
20:45	Josué 15'; Dadia 72'; Safouri 90+5'	Report	Altman (yellow card) 13'; Sylvestr 51'; Serdal (yellow card) 58'; Fadida (yellow card) 60'	Stadium: Yud-Alef; Referee: Daniel Bar Natan

7 July 2020 Match 36	Hapoel Tel Aviv	0 - 3	Hapoel Haifa	Tel Aviv
21:00		Report	Serdal 37'; Sylvestr 80'; Mizrahi 90+3'	Stadium: Bloomfield; Referee: Ziv Adler

==== Championship round table ====
Pos	Team	Pld	W	D	L	GF	GA	GD	Pts	Qualification
1	Maccabi Tel Aviv (C)	36	26	9	1	63	10	+53	87	Qualification for the Champions League first qualifying round
2	Maccabi Haifa	36	22	7	7	73	32	+41	73	Qualification for the Europa League first qualifying round
3	Beitar Jerusalem	36	16	11	9	51	35	+16	59	Qualification for the Europa League first qualifying round
4	Hapoel Be'er Sheva (Note: Qualified due to winning the 2019–20 Israel State Cup)	36	15	10	11	44	33	+11	55	Qualification for the Europa League first qualifying round
5	Hapoel Tel Aviv	36	14	6	16	31	55	−24	48	Can't qualify for international competitions
6	Hapoel Haifa	36	12	11	13	39	46	−7	47	

Source: Israel Football Association, Soccerway
Rules for classification: 1) Points; 2) Goal difference; 3) Matches won; 4) Goals scored; 5) Head-to-head points; 6) Head-to-head goal difference; 7) Head-to-head goals scored; 8) Play-off.
(C) Champions

==== Results overview ====
Win Draw Loss

Opposition	Home score	Away score
Beitar Jerusalem	0 - 0	1 - 1
Hapoel Be'er Sheva	1 - 1	1 - 3
Hapoel Tel Aviv	4 - 0	3 - 0
Maccabi Haifa	1 - 4	2 - 2
Maccabi Tel Aviv	0 - 3	0 - 2

== State Cup ==
=== Round of 32 ===
20 December 2019 Round of 32	Hapoel Bnei Lod	1 - 5	Hapoel Haifa	Lod
14:00	Hatuka 37'	Report	Vehava (yellow card) 20'; Arel (yellow card) 22'; Kanyuk 25', 77'; Zamir 32'; Ben Basat 45'; Lala 71'	Stadium: Lod Municipal; Attendance: 350; Referee: Snir Levi

=== Round of 16 ===
15 January 2020 Round of 16	Hapoel Haifa	1 - 0	Kafr Qasim	Haifa
19:15	Kanyuk 2'; Júnior (yellow card) 79'; Tapoko (yellow card) 88'	Report		Stadium: Sammy Ofer; Attendance: 1,200; Referee: Daniel Bar Natan

=== Quarter final ===
3 March 2020 Quarter final	Hapoel Haifa	0 - 2	Bnei Yehuda Tel Aviv	Haifa
20:15	Gulan (yellow card) 13'; Sylvestr (yellow card) 33'	Report	Ghadir 22'; Zubas (yellow card) 61'; Zenati 90+2'	Stadium: Sammy Ofer; Attendance: 2,370; Referee: Liran Liany

== Toto Cup ==
=== Group stage ===
Pos	Team	Pld	W	D	L	GF	GA	GD	Pts	Qualification or relegation
1	Ironi Kiryat Shmona	4	3	0	1	8	7	+1	9	Semi-finals
2	Maccabi Netanya	4	2	1	1	5	3	+2	7	5–8th classification play-offs
3	Hapoel Hadera	4	1	2	1	6	6	0	5	9–10th classification play-offs
4	Hapoel Haifa	4	1	1	2	6	6	0	4	11–12th classification play-offs
5	Hapoel Kfar Saba	4	0	2	2	4	7	−3	2	13–14th classification play-offs

Updated to match(es) played on unknown. Source: Israel Football Association
Rules for classification: 1) points; 2) goal difference; 3) number of wins; 4) goals scored; 5) head to head; 6)deciding match.

27 July 2019 Match 1	Maccabi Netanya	2 - 0	Hapoel Haifa	Netanya
19:00	Turjeman (yellow card) 56'; Drăghiceanu (yellow card) 65'; Hyka 80'; Melamed 90+5'	Report	Malul (yellow card) 38'; Tapoko (yellow card) 45' (yellow-red card) 90+2'; Vehava (yellow card) 85'; Lala (yellow card) 90+2'	Stadium: Netanya; Attendance: 3,500; Referee: Roei Rainshraiver

4 August 2019 Match 3	Hapoel Haifa	4 - 1	Hapoel Ironi Kiryat Shmona	Haifa
19:30	Zamir 9', 14'; Buzaglo 30'; Hadida (yellow card) 33'; Kapiloto 45+1'	Report	Shaker (yellow card) 16' (goal) 34'; Ryan (yellow card) 45+3'	Stadium: Sammy Ofer; Attendance: 1,500; Referee: Orel Grinfeld

7 August 2019 Match 4	Hapoel Kfar Saba	1 - 1	Hapoel Haifa	Petah Tikva
19:30	Ronen 8'; Solomon (yellow card) 64'; Getahon (yellow card) 81'	Report	Buzaglo 22'; Kapiloto (yellow card) 38'; Mishpati (yellow card) 38'	Stadium: HaMoshava; Attendance: 1,000

12 August 2019 Match 5	Hapoel Haifa	1 - 2	Hapoel Hadera	Haifa
20:30	Buzaglo 2'; Serdal (yellow card) 85'	Report	Dror (yellow card) 23'; Lúcio 71' (pen.); Dery 83'	Stadium: Sammy Ofer; Attendance: 1,500; Referee: Aviad Shiloach

=== 11-12th classification match ===
17 August 2019 11-12th	Hapoel Ra'anana	1 - 0	Hapoel Haifa	Ramat Gan
20:00	Nimni (yellow card) 8' (goal) 77' (pen.); Levy (yellow card) 53'; Naah (yellow card) 56'	Report	Balilty (yellow card) 38'; Burić (yellow card) 75'	Stadium: Ramat Gan; Attendance: 200; Referee: Erez Papir

== Statistics ==
=== Appearances and goals ===
No.	Pos	Nat	Player	Total		Ligat Ha'Al		State Cup		Toto Cup	
No.	Pos	Nat	Player	Apps	Goals	Apps	Goals	Apps	Goals	Apps	Goals
1	GK	(Israel) ISR	Ran Kadoch	2	0	2	0	0	0	0	0
2	DF	(Israel) ISR	Miki Siroshtein	19	0	17	0	2	0	0	0
4	DF	(Israel) ISR	Dor Malul	42	0	34	0	3	0	5	0
5	DF	(Israel) ISR	Ofek Fishler	1	0	1	0	0	0	0	0
6	MF	(Israel) ISR	Gal Arel	25	6	22	6	1	0	2	0
7	MF	(France) FRA	Kevin Tapoko	28	1	22	1	2	0	4	0
8	MF	(Israel) ISR	Gidi Kanyuk	31	7	28	4	3	3	0	0
9	FW	(Israel) ISR	Eden Ben Basat	31	5	23	4	3	1	5	0
10	FW	(Israel) ISR	Mahran Lala	31	2	24	1	2	1	5	0
11	MF	(Israel) ISR	Ness Zamir	41	10	33	7	3	1	5	2
12	FW	(Slovakia) SVK	Jakub Sylvestr	18	5	17	5	1	0	0	0
13	GK	(Bosnia and Herzegovina) BIH	Jasmin Burić	42	0	34	0	3	0	5	0
14	MF	(Israel) ISR	Gil Vermouth	28	0	20	0	3	0	5	0
15	DF	(Israel) ISR	Eli Balilty	36	1	29	1	2	0	5	0
16	MF	(Israel) ISR	Omer Abadi	2	0	0	0	0	0	2	0
17	FW	(Israel) ISR	Ofir Mizrahi	9	1	9	1	0	0	0	0
18	MF	(Israel) ISR	Tomer Altman	15	0	15	0	0	0	0	0
20	MF	(Israel) ISR	Sa'ar Fadida	25	2	21	2	3	0	1	0
21	MF	(Israel) ISR	Afik Katan	1	0	1	0	0	0	0	0
22	GK	(Israel) ISR	Oren Tal	0	0	0	0	0	0	0	0
23	MF	(Israel) ISR	Yarin Serdal	3	0	3	0	0	0	0	0
24	DF	(Israel) ISR	Liran Serdal	34	2	28	2	1	0	5	0
25	GK	(Israel) ISR	Amit Suari	0	0	0	0	0	0	0	0
26	DF	(Israel) ISR	Guy Mishpati	24	2	19	2	1	0	4	0
27	MF	(Israel) ISR	Snir Talias	4	0	3	0	0	0	1	0
28	FW	(Israel) ISR	Dudu Alterovich	2	0	2	0	0	0	0	0
32	DF	(Israel) ISR	Ben Vehava	21	0	15	0	1	0	5	0
34	DF	(Israel) ISR	Yarin Cohen	0	0	0	0	0	0	0	0
36	DF	(Serbia) SRB	Nikola Gulan	28	0	25	0	3	0	0	0
55	DF	(Israel) ISR	Nisso Kapiloto	23	2	19	1	1	0	3	1
77	FW	(Israel) ISR	Almog Buzaglo	23	4	19	1	0	0	4	3
Players away from Hapoel Haifa on loan:
29	FW	(Israel) ISR	Aner Shechter	4	0	3	0	1	0	0	0
Players who appeared for Hapoel Haifa that left during the season:
8	FW	(Israel) ISR	Idan Shemesh	2	0	0	0	0	0	2	0
10	FW	(Guyana) GUY	Emery Welshman	11	0	8	0	0	0	3	0
19	MF	(Guinea-Bissau) GBS	Francisco Júnior	28	0	23	0	3	0	2	0
23	MF	(Israel) ISR	Guy Hadida	7	0	2	0	0	0	5	0

=== Goalscorers ===
Rank	No.	Pos	Nat	Name	Ligat Ha'Al	State Cup	Toto Cup	Total
1	11	MF	(Israel)	Ness Zamir	7	1	2	10
2	8	MF	(Israel)	Gidi Kanyuk	4	3	0	7
3	6	MF	(Israel)	Gal Arel	6	0	0	6
4	12	FW	(Slovakia)	Jakub Sylvestr	5	0	0	5
4	9	FW	(Israel)	Eden Ben Basat	4	1	0	5
6	77	FW	(Israel)	Almog Buzaglo	1	0	3	4
7	20	MF	(Israel)	Sa'ar Fadida	2	0	0	2
7	24	DF	(Israel)	Liran Serdal	2	0	0	2
7	26	DF	(Israel)	Guy Mishpati	2	0	0	2
7	10	FW	(Israel)	Mahran Lala	1	1	0	2
7	55	DF	(Israel)	Nisso Kapiloto	1	0	1	2
12	7	MF	(France)	Kevin Tapoko	1	0	0	1
12	15	DF	(Israel)	Eli Balilty	1	0	0	1
12	17	FW	(Israel)	Ofir Mizrahi	1	0	0	0
Own goal					1	0	0	1
Totals					39	6	6	51

Last updated: 12 May 2019

=== Assists ===
Rank	No.	Pos	Nat	Name	Ligat Ha'Al	State Cup	Toto Cup	Total
1	8	MF	(Israel)	Gidi Kanyuk	6	0	0	6
2	4	DF	(Israel)	Dor Malul	3	2	0	5
3	11	MF	(Israel)	Ness Zamir	2	1	1	4
4	24	DF	(Israel)	Liran Serdal	3	0	0	3
4	15	DF	(Israel)	Eli Balilty	2	0	1	3
6	10	FW	(Israel)	Mahran Lala	2	0	0	2
6	19	MF	(Guinea-Bissau)	Francisco Júnior	2	0	0	2
6	14	MF	(Israel)	Gil Vermouth	0	2	0	2
9	7	MF	(France)	Kevin Tapoko	1	0	0	1
9	18	MF	(Israel)	Tomer Altman	1	0	0	1
9	20	MF	(Israel)	Sa'ar Fadida	1	0	0	1
9	36	DF	(Serbia)	Nikola Gulan	1	0	0	1
9	77	FW	(Israel)	Almog Buzaglo	1	0	0	1
9	9	FW	(Israel)	Eden Ben Basat	0	0	1	1
9	10	FW	(Guyana)	Emery Welshman	0	0	1	1
Totals					25	5	4	34

Last updated: 12 May 2019

=== Clean sheets ===
Updated on 12 May 2019

Rank	Pos.	No.	Name	Ligat Ha'Al	State Cup	Toto Cup	Total
13	GK	(Bosnia and Herzegovina)	Jasmin Burić	13	1	0	14
1	GK	(Israel)	Ran Kadoch	1	0	0	1
Totals				14	1	0	15

=== Disciplinary record ===
Updated on 12 May 2019

No.	Pos	Nat	Name	Ligat Ha'Al			State Cup			Toto Cup			Total		
No.	Pos	Nat	Name	Yellow card	(yellow card) (yellow-red card)	Red card	Yellow card	(yellow card) (yellow-red card)	Red card	Yellow card	(yellow card) (yellow-red card)	Red card	Yellow card	(yellow card) (yellow-red card)	Red card
20	MF	(Israel)	Sa'ar Fadida	10									10		
19	MF	(Guinea-Bissau)	Francisco Júnior	8			1						9		
7	MF	(France)	Kevin Tapoko	7			1				1		8	1	
24	DF	(Israel)	Liran Serdal	7						1			8		
32	DF	(Israel)	Ben Vehava	4		1	1			1			6		1
8	MF	(Israel)	Gidi Kanyuk	7									7		
11	MF	(Israel)	Ness Zamir	7									7		
6	MF	(Israel)	Gal Arel	5			1						6		
55	DF	(Israel)	Nisso Kapiloto	5						1			6		
4	DF	(Israel)	Dor Malul	4						1			5		
13	GK	(Bosnia and Herzegovina)	Jasmin Burić	4						1			5		
9	FW	(Israel)	Eden Ben Basat	4									4		
18	MF	(Israel)	Tomer Altman	4									4		
26	DF	(Israel)	Guy Mishpati	3						1			4		
36	DF	(Serbia)	Nikola Gulan	2			1						3		
2	DF	(Israel)	Miki Siroshtein	2									2		
17	FW	(Israel)	Ofir Mizrahi	2									2		
15	DF	(Israel)	Eli Balilty	1						1			2		
14	MF	(Israel)	Gil Vermouth	1									1		
12	FW	(Slovakia)	Jakub Sylvestr				1						1		
10	FW	(Israel)	Mahran Lala							1			1		

=== Suspensions ===
Updated on 12 May 2019

Player	Date Received	Offence	Length of suspension		
Kevin Tapoko	27 July 2019	(yellow card) 45' (yellow-red card) 90+2' vs Maccabi Netanya	1 Match	Hapoel Ironi Kiryat Shmona (H)	4 August 2019
Ben Vehava	26 October 2019	(red card) 35' vs Hapoel Tel Aviv	1 Match	Hapoel Ironi Kiryat Shmona (H)	2 November 2019
Francisco Júnior	30 November 2019	(yellow card) 10' vs Maccabi Netanya	1 Match	Bnei Yehuda Tel Aviv (H)	7 December 2019
Ben Vehava	26 October 2019	(yellow card) 20' vs Hapoel Bnei Lod	1 Match	Beitar Jerusalem (H)	30 December 2019
Kevin Tapoko	15 January 2020	(yellow card) 88' vs Kafr Qasim	1 Match	Hapoel Ra'anana (H)	25 January 2020
Sa'ar Fadida	25 January 2020	(yellow card) 87' vs Hapoel Ra'anana	1 Match	Hapoel Ironi Kiryat Shmona (A)	4 February 2020
Gidi Kanyuk	1 February 2020	(yellow card) 37' vs Hapoel Tel Aviv	1 Match	Maccabi Tel Aviv (H)	8 February 2020
Tomer Altman	8 February 2020	(yellow card) 48' vs Maccabi Tel Aviv	1 Match	Sektzia Nes Tziona (H)	22 February 2020
Ofir Mizrahi	15 February 2020	(yellow card) 85' vs Maccabi Netanya	1 Match	Bnei Yehuda Tel Aviv (A)	29 February 2020
Liran Serdal	29 February 2020	(yellow card) 85' vs Bnei Yehuda Tel Aviv	1 Match	Maccabi Tel Aviv (A)	30 May 2020
Nisso Kapiloto	30 May 2020	(yellow card) 68' vs Maccabi Tel Aviv	1 Match	Maccabi Haifa (A)	7 June 2020
Francisco Júnior	30 May 2020	(yellow card) 82' vs Maccabi Tel Aviv	1 Match	Maccabi Haifa (A)	7 June 2020
Ness Zamir	7 June 2020	(yellow card) 69' vs Maccabi Haifa	1 Match	Beitar Jerusalem (A)	17 June 2020
Sa'ar Fadida	17 June 2020	(yellow card) 36' vs Beitar Jerusalem	1 Match	Beitar Jerusalem (H)	28 June 2020
Gal Arel	28 June 2020	(yellow card) 1' vs Beitar Jerusalem	1 Match	Hapoel Be'er Sheva (A)	4 July 2020

=== Penalties ===
Updated on 12 May 2019

Date	Penalty Taker	Scored	Opponent	Competition
26.10.2019	Eden Ben Basat	Yes	Hapoel Tel Aviv	Ligat Ha'Al
26.10.2019	Gal Arel	Yes	Hapoel Tel Aviv	Ligat Ha'Al
4.12.2019	Gal Arel	Yes	Sektzia Nes Tziona	Ligat Ha'Al
4.12.2019	Eden Ben Basat	Yes	Sektzia Nes Tziona	Ligat Ha'Al
7.12.2019	Gal Arel	Yes	Bnei Yehuda Tel Aviv	Ligat Ha'Al
30.12.2019	Gal Arel	Yes	Beitar Jerusalem	Ligat Ha'Al
7.6.2020	Gal Arel	Yes	Maccabi Haifa	Ligat Ha'Al
14.6.2020	Gidi Kanyuk	Yes	Hapoel Tel Aviv	Ligat Ha'Al
14.6.2020	Gal Arel	Yes	Hapoel Tel Aviv	Ligat Ha'Al

=== Overall ===
	Total	Home	Away	Natural
Games played	44	22	22	0
Games won	15	8	7	-
Games drawn	12	5	7	-
Games lost	17	9	8	-
Biggest win	5 - 1 vs Hapoel Bnei Lod	4 - 0 vs Hapoel Tel Aviv	5 - 1 vs Hapoel Bnei Lod	-
Biggest loss	1 - 4 vs Beitar Jerusalem; 1 - 4 vs Maccabi Haifa	1 - 4 vs Beitar Jerusalem; 1 - 4 vs Maccabi Haifa	0 - 3 vs Maccabi Tel Aviv; 0 - 3 vs Maccabi Haifa	-
Biggest win (League)	4 - 0 vs Hapoel Tel Aviv	4 - 0 vs Hapoel Tel Aviv	3 - 0 vs Hapoel Tel Aviv	-
Biggest loss (League)	1 - 4 vs Beitar Jerusalem; 1 - 4 vs Maccabi Haifa	1 - 4 vs Beitar Jerusalem; 1 - 4 vs Maccabi Haifa	0 - 3 vs Maccabi Tel Aviv; 0 - 3 vs Maccabi Haifa	-
Biggest win (Cup)	5 - 1 vs Hapoel Bnei Lod	1 - 0 vs Kafr Qasim	5 - 1 vs Hapoel Bnei Lod	-
Biggest loss (Cup)	0 - 2 vs Bnei Yehuda Tel Aviv	0 - 2 vs Bnei Yehuda Tel Aviv	-	-
Biggest win (Toto)	4 - 1 vs Hapoel Ironi Kiryat Shmona	4 - 1 vs Hapoel Ironi Kiryat Shmona	-	-
Biggest loss (Toto)	0 - 2 vs Maccabi Netanya	1 - 2 vs Hapoel Hadera	0 - 2 vs Maccabi Netanya	-
Goals scored	51	29	22	-
Goals conceded	56	31	25	-
Goal difference	-5	-2	-3	-
Clean sheets	15	8	7	-
Average GF per game	1.16	1.32	1	-
Average GA per game	1.27	1.41	1.14	-
Yellow cards	104	46	58	-
Red cards	2	1	1	-
Most appearances	(Israel) Dor Malul, (Bosnia and Herzegovina) Jasmin Burić (42)			
Most goals	(Israel) Ness Zamir (10)			
Most Assist	(Israel) Gidi Kanyuk (6)			
Penalties for	9	6	3	-
Penalties against	6	3	3	-
Winning rate	34.09%	36.36%	31.82%	-

Last updated: Updated on 12 May 2019
Source: Competitive matches
