= 2019–20 Israeli Premier League =

Israeli Premier League
- Season: 2019–20
- Dates: 24 August 2019 – 7 July 2020
- Champions: Maccabi Tel Aviv
- Relegated: Sektzia Ness Ziona; Hapoel Ra'anana
- Champions League: Maccabi Tel Aviv
- Europa League: Maccabi Haifa; Beitar Jerusalem; Hapoel Be'er Sheva
- Matches: 240
- Goals: 565 (2.35 per match)
- Top goalscorer: (Australia) Nikita Rukavytsya (22 goals)
- Biggest home win: Maccabi Haifa 5–0 Hapoel Tel Aviv (4 February 2020); Bnei Yehuda 5–0 Hapoel Hadera (6 June 2020)
- Biggest away win: Beitar Jerusalem 0–4 Maccabi Tel Aviv (19 October 2019); Sektzia Ness Ziona 0–4 Beitar Jerusalem (28 September 2019); Hapoel Ra'anana 0–4 Bnei Yehuda (1 July 2020)
- Highest scoring: 7 goals Maccabi Haifa 4–3 Hapoel Ra'anana (24 August 2019); Maccabi Haifa 3–4 Maccabi Tel Aviv (6 January 2020); Maccabi Netanya F.C. 2–5 F.C. Ashdod (28 June 2020)
- Longest winning run: 6 matches Maccabi Tel Aviv
- Longest unbeaten run: 35 matches Maccabi Tel Aviv
- Longest winless run: 15 matches Hapoel Ra'anana (Twice)
- Longest losing run: 10 matches Hapoel Ra'anana
- Highest attendance: 30,071; Maccabi Haifa 3–4 Maccabi Tel Aviv (6 January 2020)
- Total attendance: 1,326,615
- Average attendance: 7,453

The 2019–20 Israeli Premier League, also known as Ligat Tel Aviv Stock Exchange for sponsorship reasons, was the 21st season since its introduction in 1999 and the 78th season of top-tier football in Israel. The season began in August 2019 and concluded in July 2020 after a suspension of 75 days due to the coronavirus pandemic.

== Teams ==
A total of fourteen teams were competing in the league, including twelve sides from the 2018–19 season and two promoted teams from the 2018–19 Liga Leumit.

Bnei Sakhnin and Maccabi Petah Tikva were relegated to the 2019–20 Liga Leumit after finishing the 2018–19 Israeli Premier League in the bottom two places.

Sektzia Ness Ziona were promoted as the winners of the 2018–19 Liga Leumit. This marked the return of Ness Ziona to the top division after 51 years of absence.

Hapoel Kfar Saba were promoted as the Runner-ups of the 2018–19 Liga Leumit. This ends the team's three years absence from the top division.

=== Stadiums and locations ===
Locations of the 2019–20 Israeli Premier League teams

Team	Location	Stadium	Capacity
Beitar Jerusalem	Jerusalem	Teddy Stadium	31,733
Bnei Yehuda	Tel Aviv	Bloomfield Stadium	29,400
F.C. Ashdod	Ashdod	Yud-Alef Stadium	7,800
Hapoel Be'er Sheva	Be'er Sheva	Turner Stadium	16,126
Hapoel Hadera	Hadera	Netanya Stadium	13,610
Hapoel Haifa	Haifa	Sammy Ofer Stadium	30,950
Hapoel Kfar Saba	Kfar Saba	HaMoshava Stadium	11,500
Hapoel Ra'anana	Ra'anana	HaMoshava Stadium	11,500
Hapoel Tel Aviv	Tel Aviv	Bloomfield Stadium	29,400
Ironi Kiryat Shmona	Kiryat Shmona	Kiryat Shmona Stadium	5,300
Maccabi Haifa	Haifa	Sammy Ofer Stadium	30,950
Maccabi Netanya	Netanya	Netanya Stadium	13,610
Maccabi Tel Aviv	Tel Aviv	Bloomfield Stadium	29,400
Sektzia Ness Ziona	Ness Ziona	HaMoshava Stadium	11,500

Beitar Jerusalem	Bnei Yehuda Tel Aviv Hapoel Tel Aviv Maccabi Tel Aviv	Hapoel Be'er Sheva
Teddy Stadium	Bloomfield Stadium	Turner Stadium
Maccabi Netanya Hapoel Hadera	Hapoel Haifa Maccabi Haifa	Ironi Kiryat Shmona
Netanya Stadium	Sammy Ofer Stadium	Kiryat Shmona Municipal Stadium
F.C. Ashdod	Sektzia Ness Ziona Hapoel Kfar Saba Hapoel Ra'anana	
Yud-Alef Stadium	HaMoshava Stadium	

=== Personnel and sponsorship ===
Team	President	Manager	Captain	Kitmaker	Shirt sponsor
Beitar Jerusalem	(Israel) Moshe Hogeg	(Israel) Ronny Levy	(Israel) Idan Vered	Umbro	Milenium Group
Bnei Yehuda	(Israel) Barak Abramov	(Israel) Elisha Levy	(Israel) Itzik Azuz	Kappa	——
F.C. Ashdod	(Israel) Jacky Ben-Zaken	(Israel) Ran Ben Shimon	(Israel) Tom Ben Zaken	Nike	——
Hapoel Be'er Sheva	(Israel) Alona Barkat	(Israel) Yossi Abukasis		Kelme	Tadiran
Hapoel Hadera	(Israel) Oren Golan	(Israel) Sharon Mimer	(Israel) Menashe Zalka	Lotto	Printer Center
Hapoel Haifa	(Israel) Yoav Katz	(Israel) Haim Silvas	(Israel) Gil Vermouth	Diadora	Moked Hat'ama
Hapoel Kfar Saba	(Israel) Itzhak Shum	(Israel) Amir Turgeman	(Israel) Omer Fadida	Macron	Advice
Hapoel Ra'anana	(Israel) Asher Alon	(Israel) Eyal Lahman	(Israel) Snir Shuker	Givova	ME Group
Hapoel Tel Aviv	(Israel) Itzik and Sharon Nisanov	(Israel) Nir Klinger	(Israel) Orel Dgani	Macron	Arkia
Ironi Kiryat Shmona	(Israel) Izzy Sheratzky	(Israel) Kobi Refua	(Israel) Idan Nachmias	Kappa	Ituran
Maccabi Haifa	(Israel) Ya'akov Shahar	(Israel) Marco Balbul	(Israel) Neta Lavi	Nike	Volvo
Maccabi Netanya	(Israel) Eyal Segal	(Israel) Slobodan Drapić	(Israel) Almog Cohen	Lotto	Panorama North
Maccabi Tel Aviv	(Canada) Mitchell Goldhar	(Serbia) Vladimir Ivić	(Israel) Sheran Yeini	Fila	PenguinPickUp
Sektzia Ness Ziona	(Israel) Kobi Kaduri	(Israel) Lior Zeda	(Israel) Sahar Levy	Diadora	Alhom

=== Foreign players ===
The number of foreign players is restricted to six per team, while only five can be registered to a game.

Club	Player 1	Player 2	Player 3	Player 4	Player 5	Player 6	Non-visa player
Beitar Jerusalem	(France) Ange-Freddy Plumain	(France) Antoine Conte	(Portugal) Diogo Verdasca	(Niger) **Ali Mohamed**	(Trinidad and Tobago) **Levi García**		
Bnei Yehuda	(Brazil) Allyson	(Lithuania) **Emilijus Zubas**	(Ghana) Joseph Mensah	(Serbia) Matija Ljujić	(South Africa) Mihlali Mayambela		
F.C. Ashdod	(Costa Rica) **Jimmy Marín**	(Ghana) Montari Kamaheni	(Ghana) Samuel Alabi	(Uganda) **Timothy Awany**	(Brazil) Renan		
Hapoel Be'er Sheva	(Netherlands) Elton Acolatse	(Lithuania) **Ernestas Šetkus**	(Portugal) David Simão	(Portugal) **Josué Pesqueira**	(Portugal) Miguel Vítor		
Hapoel Hadera	(Nigeria) **Austin Ejide**	(Togo) Didier Kougbenya	(United States) George Fochive	(Ivory Coast) Jonathan Cissé	(England) Junior Ogedi-Uzokwe	(Brazil) Lúcio Maranhão	
Hapoel Haifa	(Guinea-Bissau) **Francisco Júnior**	(Bosnia and Herzegovina) **Jasmin Burić**	(Slovakia) **Jakub Sylvestr**	(France) Kevin Tapoko	(Serbia) Nikola Gulan		
Hapoel Kfar Saba	(France) Amadou Soukouna	(Senegal) Boubacar Traorè	(Ghana) Gershon Koffie	(Uganda) **Luwagga Kizito**	(Nigeria) Sodiq Atanda		
Hapoel Ra'anana	(Curaçao) **Darryl Lachman**	(Spain) David Mateos	(Ghana) Divine Naah	(Italy) Elia Soriano	(Ghana) Eugene Ansah		
Hapoel Tel Aviv	(Ghana) Emmanuel Boateng	(Uruguay) Felipe Jorge Rodríguez	(Belgium) Marvin Peersman	(Nigeria) Michael Olaha	(North Macedonia) **Stefan Spirovski**		
Ironi Kiryat Shmona	(Lithuania) **Džiugas Bartkus**	(Nigeria) James Adeniyi	(Jamaica) **Maalique Foster**	(Brazil) Marcus Diniz	(Moldova) Radu Gînsari	(Brazil) Silas	
Maccabi Haifa	(Cameroon) **Ernest Mabouka**	(Nigeria) **Ikouwem Utin**	(Netherlands) Yanic Wildschut	(Suriname) Tjaronn Chery	(Australia) **Trent Sainsbury**		(Australia) **Nikita Rukavytsya**^{1} (United States) Joe Kuzminsky ^{2}
Maccabi Netanya	(Montenegro) **Fatos Bećiraj**	(Serbia) Lazar Ćirković	(Germany) Tim Heubach	(Serbia) Zlatan Šehović			
Maccabi Tel Aviv	(Greece) **Andreas Gianniotis**	(Portugal) André Geraldes	(Nigeria) Chikeluba Ofoedu	(Spain) Enric Saborit	(Spain) Jair Amador		(Barbados) Nick Blackman^{2}
Sektzia Ness Ziona	(Belgium) Dries Wuytens	(Albania) Jahmir Hyka	(Niger) Moussa Maâzou	(Republic of the Congo) **Ramaric Etou**	(Albania) Sabien Lilaj	(The Gambia) Seahaw Turai	

In bold: Players that have been capped for their national team.

The following do not fill a Visa position:
^{1}Players who were born and started their professional career abroad but have since gained an Israeli passport or permanent residency, allowing them to play with Israeli status;
^{2}Players who were born and started their professional career abroad but are eligible for Israeli citizenship due to Jewish ancestry;

^{3}Israeli citizens who have chosen to represent another national team;

=== Managerial changes ===
Team	Outgoing manager	Manner of departure	Date of vacancy	Position in table	Incoming manager	Date of appointment
Hapoel Tel Aviv	Kobi Refua	Sacked	14 May 2019	Pre-season	Nisso Avitan	15 May 2019
Sektzia Ness Ziona	Ofer Talsesefa	End of contract	20 May 2019	Pre-season	Amir Turgeman	27 May 2019
Hapoel Hadera	Ron Kelar	Caretaking spell over	26 May 2019	Pre-season	Ori Guttman	26 May 2019
F.C. Ashdod	Avi Bohbot	End of contract	27 May 2019	Pre-season	Ronny Awat and Moshe Ohayon	27 May 2019
Beitar Jerusalem	Nir Klinger	Sacked	4 June 2019	Pre-season	Ronny Levy	6 June 2019
Ironi Kiryat Shmona	Messay Dego	Sacked	20 October 2019	13th	Kobi Refua	20 October 2019
Hapoel Tel Aviv	Nisso Avitan	Sacked	5 November 2019	11th	Nir Klinger	5 November 2019
Hapoel Hadera	Ori Guttman	Left	29 November 2019	5th	Sharon Mimer	10 December 2019
Hapoel Ra'anana	Meni Koretski	Left	10 December 2019	13th	Nisso Avitan	10 December 2019
Hapoel Be'er Sheva	Barak Bakhar	Left	6 January 2020	4th	Yossi Abukasis	8 January 2020
Bnei Yehuda	Yossi Abukasis	Signed by Hapoel Be'er Sheva	8 January 2020	6th	Elisha Levy	8 January 2020
F.C. Ashdod	Ronny Awat	Stepped down to the position of Assistant Manager	21 January 2020	10th	Ran Ben Shimon	21 January 2020
Sektzia Ness Ziona	Amir Turgeman	Sacked	5 February 2020	14th	Lior Zeda	15 February 2020
Hapoel Ra'anana	Nisso Avitan	Sacked	17 February 2020	14th	Gal Cohen	17 February 2020
Hapoel Kfar Saba	Ofir Haim	Sacked	26 February 2020	11th	Amir Turgeman	27 February 2020
Hapoel Ra'anana	Gal Cohen	Stepped down to the position of Assistant Manager	24 May 2020	14th	Eyal Lahman	24 May 2020

== Regular season ==
=== Regular season table ===
Pos	Team	Pld	W	D	L	GF	GA	GD	Pts	Qualification or relegation
1	Maccabi Tel Aviv	26	19	7	0	48	7	+41	64	Qualification for the Championship round
2	Maccabi Haifa	26	18	4	4	58	20	+38	58	Qualification for the Championship round
3	Beitar Jerusalem	26	15	4	7	42	25	+17	49	Qualification for the Championship round
4	Hapoel Be'er Sheva	26	13	5	8	33	23	+10	44	Qualification for the Championship round
5	Hapoel Tel Aviv	26	11	5	10	24	36	−12	38	Qualification for the Championship round
6	Hapoel Haifa	26	10	7	9	26	30	−4	37	Qualification for the Championship round
7	Bnei Yehuda	26	9	7	10	23	26	−3	34	Qualification for the Relegation round
8	Hapoel Hadera	26	9	7	10	24	28	−4	34	Qualification for the Relegation round
9	Maccabi Netanya	26	8	7	11	23	32	−9	31	Qualification for the Relegation round
10	F.C. Ashdod	26	6	10	10	30	33	−3	28	Qualification for the Relegation round
11	Hapoel Kfar Saba	26	7	5	14	22	35	−13	26	Qualification for the Relegation round
12	Ironi Kiryat Shmona	26	6	4	16	24	35	−11	22	Qualification for the Relegation round
13	Sektzia Ness Ziona	26	5	6	15	17	40	−23	21	Qualification for the Relegation round
14	Hapoel Ra'anana	26	2	10	14	20	44	−24	16	Qualification for the Relegation round

Updated to match(es) played on unknown. Source: Soccerway
Rules for classification: 1) Points; 2) Goal difference; 3) Matches won; 4) Goals scored; 5) Head-to-head points; 6) Head-to-head goal difference; 7) Head-to-head goals scored; 8) Play-off.

=== Regular season results ===
Home \ Away	ASH	BEI	BnY	HAH	HBS	HHA	HKS	HRA	HTA	IKS	MHA	MNE	MTA	NES
F.C. Ashdod	—	2–2	0–1	0–2	2–2	1–1	0–0	3–0	2–1	1–0	1–2	0–0	0–1	2–1
Beitar Jerusalem	2–1	—	1–3	2–0	0–0	0–2	1–0	2–0	0–1	2–2	2–0	3–1	0–4	1–0
Bnei Yehuda	2–0	0–2	—	0–1	0–1	0–0	0–1	1–1	1–2	2–1	1–3	0–0	0–3	1–2
Hapoel Hadera	1–1	1–2	0–0	—	0–1	2–0	2–0	4–0	0–1	2–2	0–3	1–0	0–3	1–0
Hapoel Be'er Sheva	2–1	0–1	1–2	3–0	—	1–0	3–1	1–0	3–0	2–1	0–2	2–0	1–1	3–0
Hapoel Haifa	1–0	1–4	3–0	1–2	0–3	—	0–2	2–2	3–0	2–1	0–0	1–3	1–1	2–0
Hapoel Kfar Saba	1–3	2–1	0–1	0–0	0–1	0–1	—	3–0	1–2	0–3	0–3	1–2	0–1	1–1
Hapoel Ra'anana	1–1	2–1	0–1	1–1	2–1	0–0	1–1	—	2–2	1–1	0–0	1–2	0–2	0–0
Hapoel Tel Aviv	0–0	0–1	1–1	2–1	1–0	0–1	2–1	3–1	—	2–0	1–2	0–0	0–3	1–1
Ironi Kiryat Shmona	2–0	0–2	2–1	0–1	0–0	1–2	1–3	2–1	0–1	—	1–2	3–0	0–1	1–0
Maccabi Haifa	3–3	3–1	1–1	1–0	4–0	3–0	0–1	4–3	5–0	2–0	—	3–0	3–4	4–0
Maccabi Netanya	2–4	0–3	0–3	1–0	1–1	0–0	2–2	1–0	4–0	1–0	0–2	—	0–1	3–0
Maccabi Tel Aviv	2–0	0–0	0–0	0–0	2–0	3–0	4–0	2–1	3–0	3–0	1–0	0–0	—	1–1
Sektzia Ness Ziona	0–2	0–4	0–1	1–2	2–1	2–2	0–1	3–0	0–1	1–0	0–3	1–0	0–2	—

Updated to match(es) played on unknown. Source: Israel Football Association
Legend: Blue = home team win; Yellow = draw; Red = away team win.

== Championship round ==
Key numbers for pairing determination (number marks position after 26 games)

Rounds
27th	28th	29th	30th	31st	32nd	33rd	34th	35th	36th
1 – 6; 2 – 5; 3 – 4	1 – 2; 5 – 3; 6 – 4	2 – 6; 3 – 1; 4 – 5	1 – 4; 2 – 3; 6 – 5	3 – 6; 4 – 2; 5 – 1	6 – 1; 5 – 2; 4 – 3	2 – 1; 3 – 5; 4 – 6	6 – 2; 1 – 3; 5 – 4	3 – 2; 4 – 1; 5 – 6	6 – 3; 2 – 4; 1 – 5

Due to 2 teams that play in the Sammy Ofer Stadium qualified to this round, and in order to insure that all the last games of this round, can be played in the same time (for purity reasons), the order of the games, has been changed, affecting fixtures 33, 35 and 36.

Rounds
33rd	34th	35th	36th
6 – 3; 2 – 4; 1 – 5	6 – 2; 1 – 3; 5 – 4	2 – 1; 3 – 5; 4 – 6	3 – 2; 4 – 1; 5 – 6

=== Championship round table ===
Pos	Team	Pld	W	D	L	GF	GA	GD	Pts	Qualification
1	Maccabi Tel Aviv (C)	36	26	9	1	63	10	+53	87	Qualification for the Champions League first qualifying round
2	Maccabi Haifa	36	22	7	7	73	32	+41	73	Qualification for the Europa League first qualifying round
3	Beitar Jerusalem	36	16	11	9	51	35	+16	59	Qualification for the Europa League first qualifying round
4	Hapoel Be'er Sheva (Note: Qualified due to winning the 2019–20 Israel State Cup)	36	15	10	11	44	33	+11	55	Qualification for the Europa League first qualifying round
5	Hapoel Tel Aviv	36	14	6	16	31	55	−24	48	Can't qualify for international competitions
6	Hapoel Haifa	36	12	11	13	39	46	−7	47	

Source: Israel Football Association, Soccerway
Rules for classification: 1) Points; 2) Goal difference; 3) Matches won; 4) Goals scored; 5) Head-to-head points; 6) Head-to-head goal difference; 7) Head-to-head goals scored; 8) Play-off.
(C) Champions
Notes:

2019–20 Israeli Premier League champions

Maccabi Tel Aviv
23rd title

=== Championship round results ===
Home \ Away	BEI	HBS	HHA	HTA	MHA	MTA
Beitar Jerusalem	—	1–1	1–1	3–0	2–2	0–0
Hapoel Be'er Sheva	2–2	—	3–1	0–0	0–1	2–0
Hapoel Haifa	0–0	1–1	—	4–0	1–4	0–3
Hapoel Tel Aviv	3–0	1–0	0–3	—	1–3	0–2
Maccabi Haifa	0–0	2–1	2–2	1–2	—	0–1
Maccabi Tel Aviv	1–0	1–1	2–0	3–0	2–0	—

Source: Israel Football Association
Legend: Blue = home team win; Yellow = draw; Red = away team win.

=== Positions by round ===
Team ╲ Round	26	27	28	29	30	31	32	33	34	35	36
Maccabi Tel Aviv	1	1	1	1	1	1	1	1	1	1	1
Maccabi Haifa	2	2	2	2	2	2	2	2	2	2	2
Beitar Jerusalem	3	3	3	3	3	3	3	3	3	3	3
Hapoel Be'er Sheva	4	4	4	4	4	4	4	4	4	4	4
Hapoel Tel Aviv	5	5	5	5	5	5	5	5	5	5	5
Hapoel Haifa	6	6	6	6	6	6	6	6	6	6	6

2020–21 UEFA Champions League Second qualifying round
2020–21 UEFA Europa League First qualifying round

== Relegation round ==
Key numbers for pairing determination (number marks position after 26 games)

Rounds
27th	28th	29th	30th	31st	32nd	33rd
7 – 11; 8 – 13; 9 – 12; 10 – 14	11 – 14; 12 – 10; 13 – 9; 7 – 8	8 – 11; 9 – 7; 10 – 13; 14 – 12	11 – 12; 13 – 14; 7 – 10; 8 – 9	9 – 11; 10 – 8; 14 – 7; 12 – 13	11 – 13; 7 – 12; 8 – 14; 9 – 10	10 – 11; 14 – 9; 12 – 8; 13 – 7

Due to 2 teams that play in the HaMoshava Stadium qualified to this round, and in order to insure that all the last games of this round, can be played in the same time(for purity reasons), the order of the games, has been changed. Affecting fixtures 31 and 33.

Rounds
31st	32nd	33rd
10 – 11; 14 – 9; 12 – 8; 13 – 7	11 – 13; 7 – 12; 8 – 14; 9 – 10	9 – 11; 10 – 8; 14 – 7; 12 – 13

=== Relegation round table ===
Pos	Team	Pld	W	D	L	GF	GA	GD	Pts	Relegation
7	Bnei Yehuda	33	13	10	10	40	30	+10	49	
8	F.C. Ashdod	33	10	11	12	48	47	+1	41	
9	Hapoel Hadera	33	10	10	13	33	42	−9	40	
10	Maccabi Netanya	33	11	7	15	35	46	−11	40	
11	Hapoel Kfar Saba	33	10	8	15	28	38	−10	38	
12	Ironi Kiryat Shmona	33	9	5	19	30	43	−13	32	
13	Sektzia Ness Ziona (R)	33	8	8	17	23	46	−23	32	Relegation to Liga Leumit
14	Hapoel Ra'anana (R)	33	2	11	20	27	62	−35	17	Relegation to Liga Leumit

Source: Soccerway
Rules for classification: 1) Points; 2) Goal difference; 3) Matches won; 4) Goals scored; 5) Head-to-head points; 6) Head-to-head goal difference; 7) Head-to-head goals scored; 8) Play-off.
(R) Relegated

=== Relegation round results ===
Home \ Away	ASH	BnY	HAH	HKS	HRA	IKS	MNE	NES
F.C. Ashdod	—	—	3–1	2–3	3–2	—	—	2–0
Bnei Yehuda	0–0	—	5–0	0–0	—	2–0	—	—
Hapoel Hadera	—	—	—	0–0	2–2	—	1–2	2–2
Hapoel Kfar Saba	—	—	—	—	2–0	0–0	—	0–1
Hapoel Ra'anana	—	0–4	—	—	—	0–1	2–4	—
Ironi Kiryat Shmona	3–0	—	0–3	—	—	—	—	1–0
Maccabi Netanya	2–5	1–3	—	0–1	—	3–1	—	—
Sektzia Ness Ziona	—	0–0	—	—	2–1	—	1–0	—

Source: Israel Football Association
Legend: Blue = home team win; Yellow = draw; Red = away team win.

=== Positions by round ===
Team ╲ Round	26	27	28	29	30	31	32	33
Bnei Yehuda	7	7	7	7	7	7	7	7
F.C. Ashdod	10	10	10	10	10	10	10	8
Hapoel Hadera	8	8	8	8	9	9	8	9
Maccabi Netanya	9	9	9	9	8	8	9	10
Hapoel Kfar Saba	11	11	11	11	11	11	11	11
Ironi Kiryat Shmona	12	12	12	12	12	12	13	12
Sektzia Ness Ziona	13	13	13	13	13	13	12	13
Hapoel Ra'anana	14	14	14	14	14	14	14	14

Relegation to Liga Leumit

== Season statistics ==
=== Top scorers ===
Rank	Player	Club	Goals
1	(Australia) (Israel) Nikita Rukavytsya	Maccabi Haifa	22
2	(Israel) Ben Sahar	Hapoel Be'er Sheva	13
3	(Israel) Yonatan Cohen	Maccabi Tel Aviv	12
4	(Israel) Omri Altman	Hapoel Tel Aviv	11
4	(Israel) Dean David	F.C. Ashdod	11
6	(Suriname) Tjaronn Chery	Maccabi Haifa	10
6	(Israel) Omer Fadida	Hapoel Kfar Saba	10
6	(Israel) Dor Jan	Bnei Yehuda	10
9	(Israel) Shlomi Azulay	Beitar Jerusalem	9
9	(Nigeria) Chikeluba Ofoedu	Maccabi Tel Aviv	9
9	(Israel) Eliel Peretz	Hapoel Hadera	9
9	(Israel) Raz Stein	Sektzia Ness Ziona	9

Source: (Hebrew)

=== Hat-tricks ===
Player	For	Against	Result	Date	Round	Reference
(Israel) Dor Jan	Bnei Yehuda Tel Aviv F.C.	Hapoel Ra'anana A.F.C.	4–0	1 July 2020	33	

== Average attendances ==
Pos	Team	Total	High	Low	Average	Change
1	Maccabi Haifa	255,826	30,071	15,173	21,319	+36.0%
2	Maccabi Tel Aviv	248,124	27,566	9,409	20,677	+111.4%
3	Hapoel Be'er Sheva	138,531	15,300	7,121	11,555	−15.0%
4	Hapoel Tel Aviv	138,531	21,800	3,432	11,544	+87.7%
5	Beitar Jerusalem	135,564	21,500	5,005	11,297	+4.5%
6	Maccabi Netanya	67,559	9,365	3,712	5,630	+0.1%
7	Hapoel Haifa	65,729	23,400	3,030	5,477	+2.0%
8	Bnei Yehuda	44,581	8,903	690	3,715	+10.6%
9	Hapoel Kfar Saba	33,646	7,443	715	2,803	n/a^{1}
10	Sektzia Ness Ziona	33,302	10,526	180	2,775	n/a^{1}
11	Hapoel Ra'anana	31,361	7,919	325	2,613	+66.2%
12	Hapoel Hadera	27,530	8,422	770	2,294	−21.2%
13	F.C. Ashdod	22,598	4,600	550	1,883	+7.3%
14	Ironi Kiryat Shmona	18,471	4,259	530	1,539	+8.5%
	League total	1,261,480	30,071	180	7,509	+25.9%

Updated to games played on 27 February 2020
Notes:
1: Team played last season in Liga Leumit.
