= Sa'ar Fadida =

Israeli footballer (born 1997)

Personal information
- Date of birth: 4 January 1997 (age 29)
- Place of birth: Haifa, Israel
- Height: 1.82 m (6 ft 0 in)
- Position: Attacking midfielder

Team information
- Current team: Ashdod
- Number: 10

Youth career
- –2016: Hapoel Haifa

Senior career*
Years	Team	Apps	(Gls)
2016–2022	Hapoel Haifa	91	(3)
2018–2019	→ Hapoel Rishon LeZion (loan)	10	(0)
2022–2023	Hapoel Hadera	30	(5)
2023–2024	Olimpija Ljubljana	23	(3)
2024–2026	Maccabi Bnei Reineh	50	(6)
2026–	Hapoel Haifa	9	(0)
- * Club domestic league appearances and goals as of 26 June 2025

Sa'ar Fadida (Hebrew: סַעַר פַּדִּידָה, romanized: Sa'ar Padi'da; born 4 January 1997) is an Israeli professional footballer who plays as an attacking midfielder for Hapoel Haifa].

== Club career ==
=== Olimpija Ljubljana ===
In June 2023, Fadida signed a contract with Slovenian PrvaLiga club Olimpija Ljubljana until summer 2025. He made his debut on 11 July against Valmiera in the first qualifying round of the 2023–24 UEFA Champions League, which Olimpija won 2–1.

== Career statistics ==
=== Club ===
As of match played 1 June 2024

Appearances and goals by club, season and competition
Club	Season	League			National cup		Continental		Total	
Club	Season	Division	Apps	Goals	Apps	Goals	Apps	Goals	Apps	Goals
Hapoel Haifa	2016–17	Israeli Premier League	6	0	0	0	—		6	0
Hapoel Haifa	2017–18	Israeli Premier League	6	0	2	0	—		8	0
Hapoel Haifa	2019–20	Israeli Premier League	21	2	3	0	—		24	2
Hapoel Haifa	2020–21	Israeli Premier League	31	1	1	0	—		32	1
Hapoel Haifa	2021–22	Israeli Premier League	27	0	4	0	—		31	0
Hapoel Haifa	Total		91	3	10	0	0	0	101	3
Hapoel Rishon LeZion (loan)	2018–19	Liga Leumit	10	0	0	0	—		10	0
Hapoel Hadera	2022–23	Israeli Premier League	30	5	0	0	—		30	5
Olimpija Ljubljana	2023–24	Slovenian PrvaLiga	7	3	0	0	5 (Note: Three appearances in UEFA Champions League, two appearances in UEFA Europa League)	0	12	3
Maccabi Bnei Reineh	2024–25	Israeli Premier League	0	0	0	0	—		0	0
Maccabi Bnei Reineh	2025–26	Israeli Premier League	0	0	0	0	—		0	0
Hapoel Haifa	2025–26	Israeli Premier League	0	0	0	0	—		0	0
Career total			138	11	10	0	5	0	153	11

== Honours ==
Hapoel Haifa

- Israel State Cup: 2017–18
- Israel Super Cup: 2018
