= Guy Tapoko =

Cameroonian footballer

Personal information
- Full name: Guy-Noël Tapoko
- Date of birth: 25 December 1968 (age 57)
- Place of birth: Bangangté, Cameroon
- Height: 1.78 m (5 ft 10 in)
- Position: Midfielder

Senior career*
Years	Team	Apps	(Gls)
1986–1987	Mystère Douala		
1988–1991	Panthère du Ndé		
1991–1999	Laval	181	(3)
1999–2002	Tinqueux		
2002–2003	Ancienne Château-Gontier		
Total		181	(3)

International career
1990–1997	Cameroon		
- * Club domestic league appearances and goals

Guy-Noël Tapoko (born 25 December 1968) is a Cameroonian former international footballer who played as a midfielder.

== Personal life ==
Tapoko holds Cameroonian and French nationalities. He acquired French nationality by naturalization on 15 October 1996. He is the father of the French footballer Kevin Tapoko.
