= Emery Welshman =

Guyanese footballer (born 1991)

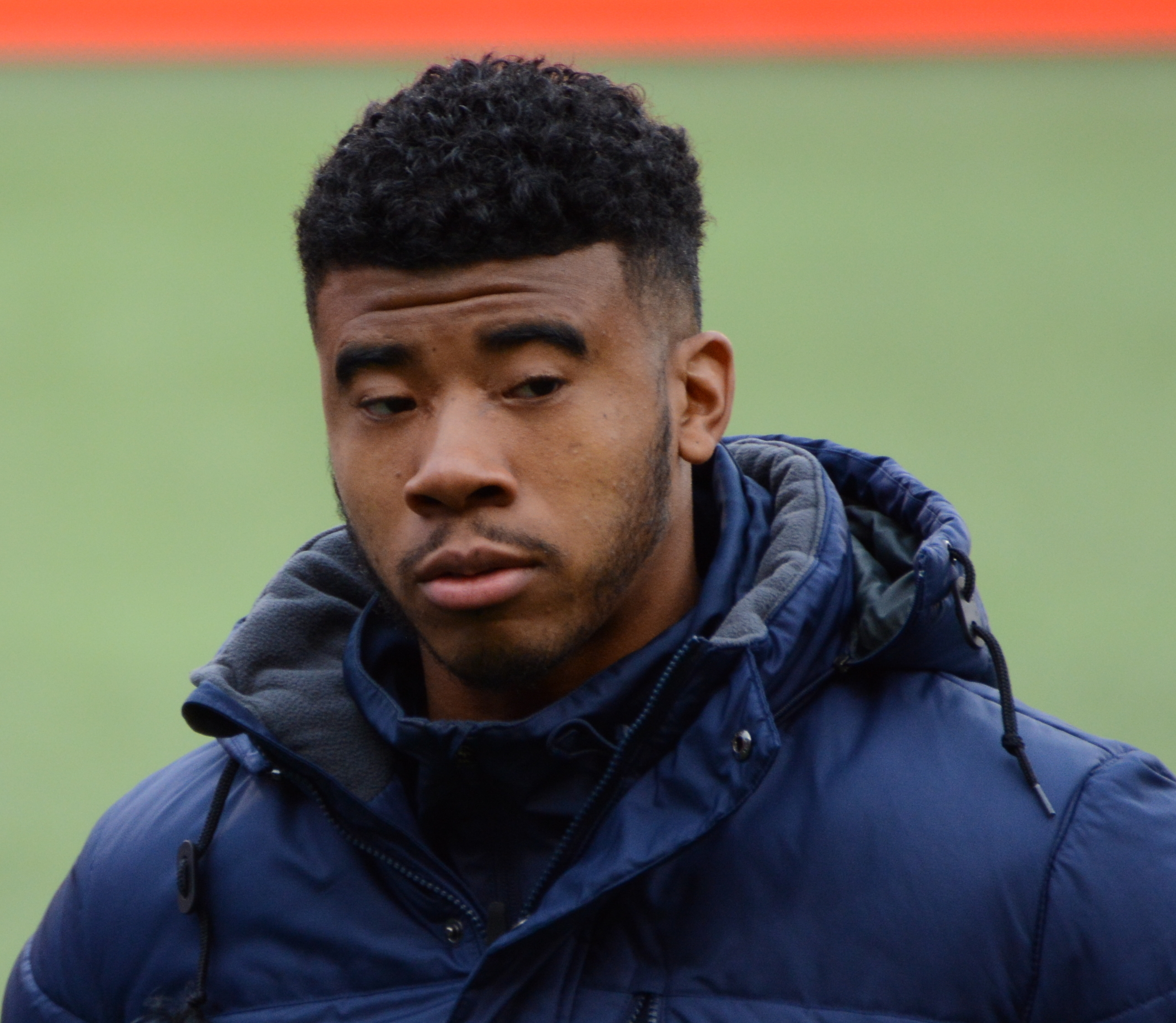
- Welshman in 2018

Personal information
- Full name: Emery Simeon Alexander Welshman
- Date of birth: 9 November 1991 (age 35)
- Place of birth: Mississauga, Ontario, Canada
- Height: 1.83 m (6 ft 0 in)
- Position: Forward

Youth career
- 2003–?: Brampton East SC
- Sigma FC

College career
Years	Team	Apps	(Gls)
2009–2010	Siena Saints	35	(19)
2011–2012	Oregon State Beavers	35	(13)

Senior career*
Years	Team	Apps	(Gls)
2012	Portland Timbers U23	12	(2)
2013	Toronto FC	1	(0)
2014	Sigma FC	18	(16)
2015	Real Monarchs	19	(6)
2016	Real Salt Lake	0	(0)
2016	→ Real Monarchs (loan)	3	(0)
2017	Puerto Rico FC	22	(5)
2018–2019	FC Cincinnati	26	(4)
2019	→ Forge FC (loan)	27	(3)
2019–2020	Hapoel Haifa	8	(0)
2020–2021	Bnei Sakhnin	25	(3)
2021	Hapoel Ra'anana	15	(6)
2021–2022	Forge FC	30	(2)
2023–2024	Sigma FC	11	(10)

International career^{‡}
2015–2023	Guyana	28	(11)
- * Club domestic league appearances and goals as of 18 May 2024 ‡ National team caps and goals as of 18 June 2023

Emery Simeon Alexander Welshman (born 9 November 1991) is a former professional footballer who played as a forward. Born in Canada, he represented the Guyana national team.

== Club career ==
=== Early career ===
Welshman attended Siena College of the Metro Atlantic Athletic Conference his freshman and sophomore years in college. He was named the MAAC rookie of the year in 2009 after recording 6 goals and 3 assists. His stellar sophomore season saw him jump onto the national stage after recording 13 goals and 3 assists in only 16 games played. He was awarded MAAC offensive player of the year award, all MAAC first team honors and all Region first team honors. He transferred to Oregon State University of the Pac-12 Conference for his final two years of college. He was named to the All-Pac-12 first team after his junior year in 2011 after recording 3 goals and 7 assists. He was again named to the All-Pac-12 first team his senior year after recording 10 goals and 4 assists. He was one of 54 seniors invited to the 2013 MLS Combine.

=== Toronto FC ===
Welshman was drafted sixteenth overall in the 2013 MLS SuperDraft by Toronto FC. He made his debut for Toronto as a second half sub in a 1–0 away defeat to Vancouver Whitecaps FC. He started and played the full 90 in Toronto's 2–0 home leg victory against Montreal Impact in the 2013 Canadian Championship. After failing to make another senior team appearance Welshman was released by Toronto in February 2014.

=== Sigma FC ===
He spent 2014 playing for Sigma FC in League1 Ontario.

=== Real Salt Lake ===
In February 2015, Welshman joined the preseason camp of Real Salt Lake as a trialist. He ultimately signed with their reserve team, Real Monarchs.

In January 2016, Welshman was promoted and signed a deal with Real Salt Lake. His contract option was declined at the end of the 2016 MLS season.

=== Puerto Rico FC ===
Welshman joined Puerto Rico FC ahead of the 2017 NASL season.

=== FC Cincinnati ===
On January 3, 2018, Welshman signed a contract with USL side FC Cincinnati. On May 16, 2018, Welshman scored his first professional hat-trick in a 4–1 victory over Detroit City FC in the second round of the 2018 U.S. Open Cup. He re-signed with the club ahead of their entry into MLS for the 2019 season on December 10, 2018.

==== Loan to Forge FC ====
Cincinnati loaned Welshman to Forge FC of the Canadian Premier League for the 2019 CPL season on March 8, 2019. He was recalled from his loan on August 2, and his contract with Cincinnati was terminated by mutual consent.

=== Hapoel Haifa ===
In August 2019, Welshman signed with Hapoel Haifa of the Israeli Premier League.

=== Bnei Sakhnin ===
On 23 January 2020 signed with Bnei Sakhnin.

=== Return to Forge FC ===
On September 14, 2021, he re-joined Forge FC in the Canadian Premier League. He won a league title with the club in 2022.

In 2023, he played with Forge's affiliate club Sigma FC.

In December 2023, Welshman announced his retirement from professional soccer. As of 2024, he continued to play for Sigma.

== International career ==
Welshman is eligible for Guyana through his parents. In January 2015 it was reported that he was invited by Guyana coach Jamaal Shabazz to an upcoming training camp ahead of a match against Barbados. He made his debut on February 1 against Barbados and scored a goal.

In Guyana's final match of the CONCACAF Nations League qualifying tournament, Welshman scored the match winner against Belize, sending the nation to the CONCACAF Gold Cup for the first time in their history. In May 2019, he was named to Guyana's provisional squad for the Gold Cup. He was named to the final squad on May 30.

In June 2023 Welshman was named to the Guyana's 23-man squad for the 2023 CONCACAF Gold Cup qualification tournament.

== Career statistics ==
=== Club ===
As of 20 December 2020

Club	Season	League			National Cup (Note: Includes appearances in the Canadian Championship and U.S. Open Cup.)		League Cup (Note: Includes appearances in the Toto Cup.)		Continental (Note: Includes appearances in CONCACAF League.)		Other (Note: Includes appearances in the USL Playoffs.)		Total	
Club	Season	Division	Apps	Goals	Apps	Goals	Apps	Goals	Apps	Goals	Apps	Goals	Apps	Goals
Portland Timbers U23	2012	Premier Development League	12	2	—		—		—		0	0	12	2
Toronto FC	2013	Major League Soccer	1	0	1	0	—		—		0	0	2	0
Sigma FC	2014	League1 Ontario	18	16	—		—		—		0	0	18	16
Real Monarchs	2015	United Soccer League	19	6	1	0	—		—		0	0	20	6
Real Monarchs	2016	United Soccer League	3	0	0	0	—		—		0	0	3	0
Real Monarchs	Total		22	6	1	0	0	0	0	0	0	0	23	6
Puerto Rico FC	2017	NASL	22	5	—		—		—		0	0	22	5
FC Cincinnati	2018	United Soccer League	26	4	3	3	—		—		2	0	31	7
FC Cincinnati	2019	Major League Soccer	0	0	0	0	—		—		0	0	0	0
FC Cincinnati	Total		26	4	3	3	0	0	0	0	2	0	31	7
Forge FC (loan)	2019	Canadian Premier League	11	3	1	1	—		1	0	0	0	13	4
Hapoel Haifa	2019–20	Israeli Premier League	8	0	0	0	3	0	—		0	0	11	0
Bnei Sakhnin	2019–20	Liga Leumit	15	3	0	0	0	0	—		0	0	15	3
Bnei Sakhnin	2020–21	Israeli Premier League	8	0	0	0	2	0	—		0	0	10	0
Bnei Sakhnin	Total		23	3	0	0	2	0	0	0	0	0	25	3
Career total			143	39	6	4	5	0	1	0	2	0	157	43

=== International ===
As of match played 25 March 2023

National team	Year	Apps	Goals
Guyana	2015	5	3
Guyana	2016	1	0
Guyana	2017	2	0
Guyana	2018	2	3
Guyana	2019	9	3
Guyana	2020	0	0
Guyana	2021	3	1
Guyana	2022	2	1
Guyana	2023	3	0
Total		27	11

==== International goals ====
Scores and results list Guyana's goal tally first.

No.	Date	Venue	Cap	Opponent	Score	Result	Competition
1.	1 February 2015	National Stadium, Saint Michael, Barbados	1	Barbados	2–0	2–2	Friendly
2.	14 June 2015	Providence Stadium, Providence, Guyana	5	Saint Vincent and the Grenadines	1–1	4–4	2018 FIFA World Cup qualification
3.	14 June 2015	Providence Stadium, Providence, Guyana	5	Saint Vincent and the Grenadines	3–4	4–4	2018 FIFA World Cup qualification
4.	13 October 2018	TCIFA National Academy, Providenciales, Turks and Caicos Islands	9	Turks and Caicos Islands	2–0	8–0	2019–20 CONCACAF Nations League qualification
5.	13 October 2018	TCIFA National Academy, Providenciales, Turks and Caicos Islands	9	Turks and Caicos Islands	6–0	8–0	2019–20 CONCACAF Nations League qualification
6.	13 October 2018	TCIFA National Academy, Providenciales, Turks and Caicos Islands	9	Turks and Caicos Islands	8–0	8–0	2019–20 CONCACAF Nations League qualification
7.	23 March 2019	Synthetic Track and Field Facility, Leonora, Guyana	11	Belize	2–1	2–1	2019–20 CONCACAF Nations League qualification
8.	11 October 2019	Sir Vivian Richards Stadium, North Sound, Antigua and Barbuda	16	Antigua and Barbuda	1–2	1–2	2019–20 CONCACAF Nations League B
9.	18 November 2019	Montego Bay Sports Complex, Montego Bay, Jamaica	19	Jamaica	1–0	1–1	2019–20 CONCACAF Nations League B
10.	30 March 2021	Félix Sánchez Olympic Stadium, Santo Domingo, Dominican Republic	21	Bahamas	4–0	4–0	2022 FIFA World Cup qualification
11.	11 June 2022	Synthetic Track and Field Facility, Leonora, Guyana	24	Haiti	1–2	2–6	2022–23 CONCACAF Nations League B
Correct as of 11 June 2022
