= Eli Balilty =

Israeli footballer

Personal information
- Full name: Eliyahu Balilty
- Date of birth: 23 February 1994 (age 32)
- Place of birth: Afula, Israel
- Position: Left back

Team information
- Current team: Maccavi Akhi Nazareth
- Number: 51

Youth career
- 2003–2010: Hapoel Afula
- 2010–2011: Maccabi Netanya
- 2011–2014: Ironi Kiryat Shmona

Senior career*
Years	Team	Apps	(Gls)
2014–2017	Ironi Kiryat Shmona	6	(0)
2014–2015	→ Hapoel Afula	33	(0)
2016	→ Hapoel Afula	16	(1)
2017	→ Hapoel Afula	14	(0)
2017–2018	Bnei Yehuda	12	(0)
2018–2019	Hapoel Nazareth Illit	33	(0)
2019–2020	Hapoel Haifa	29	(1)
2020–2022	Hapoel Nof HaGalil	51	(4)
2022–2026	Ironi Tiberias	131	(4)
2026–	Maccavi Akhi Nazareth	0	(0)

International career
2016	Israel U21	3	(0)
- * Club domestic league appearances and goals as of 24 June 2026

Eli Balilty (Hebrew: אלי בלילתי; born 23 February 1994) is an Israeli footballer who plays for Maccavi Akhi Nazareth as a defender.
