= Mohamed Shaker =

Egyptian diplomat and political scientist

Dr. Mohamed Shaker
- محمد شاكر

Ambassador of Egypt to the United Kingdom
- In office 14 September 1988 – 15 September 1997

Member of Board of Governors of the International Atomic Energy Agency
- In office 1986–1988

Personal details
- Born: 16 October 1933 Cairo, Egypt
- Died: 29 March 2018 (aged 84) Cairo, Egypt
- Education: University of Cairo; Graduate Institute of International and Development Studies
- Occupation: Diplomat

Dr. Mohamed Ibrahim Shaker (Arabic: محمد ابراهيم شاكر; 16 October 1933 – 29 March 2018), was an Egyptian diplomat and political scientist.

Born in Egypt capital city, Cairo in 1933, he graduated in Cairo University in 1955 and completed his studies until he received his doctorate in political science from the Graduate Institute of International and Development Studies at the University of Geneva in 1975. From 1976 to 1980 he worked in the Embassy of Egypt in Washington, D.C. On 22 August 1982, he became Ambassador to the International Atomic Energy Agency (IAEA) in New York and remained in this post until December 1983. He served as Egypt's Deputy Delegate to the United Nations Security Council in New York from 1984 to 1985. He was then appointed Ambassador of Egypt to Austria.

Was member of the Board of Governors of the International Atomic Energy Agency (IAEA) in Vienna from 1986 to 1988. He served as Ambassador of Egypt to the United Kingdom from September 1988 to September 1997. He served as the General Representative of the International Atomic Energy Agency to the United Nations in New York and remained in office until December 1983. From January 1993 to December 1998 was a member of the Consultative Council of the United Nations Office for Disarmament Affairs. He also served as President of the Council in 1995 and as a member of the Technical Committee for Tillage Education (2001-2002). He was elected as Chairman of the Board of Directors of the National Organization for Management and Security. He was awarded by Order of the Republic in 1976, and the Order of Merit in 1983, both by the President of Egypt. He died on 29 March 2018, aged 84.
