= Jasmin Burić =

Bosnian footballer (born 1987)

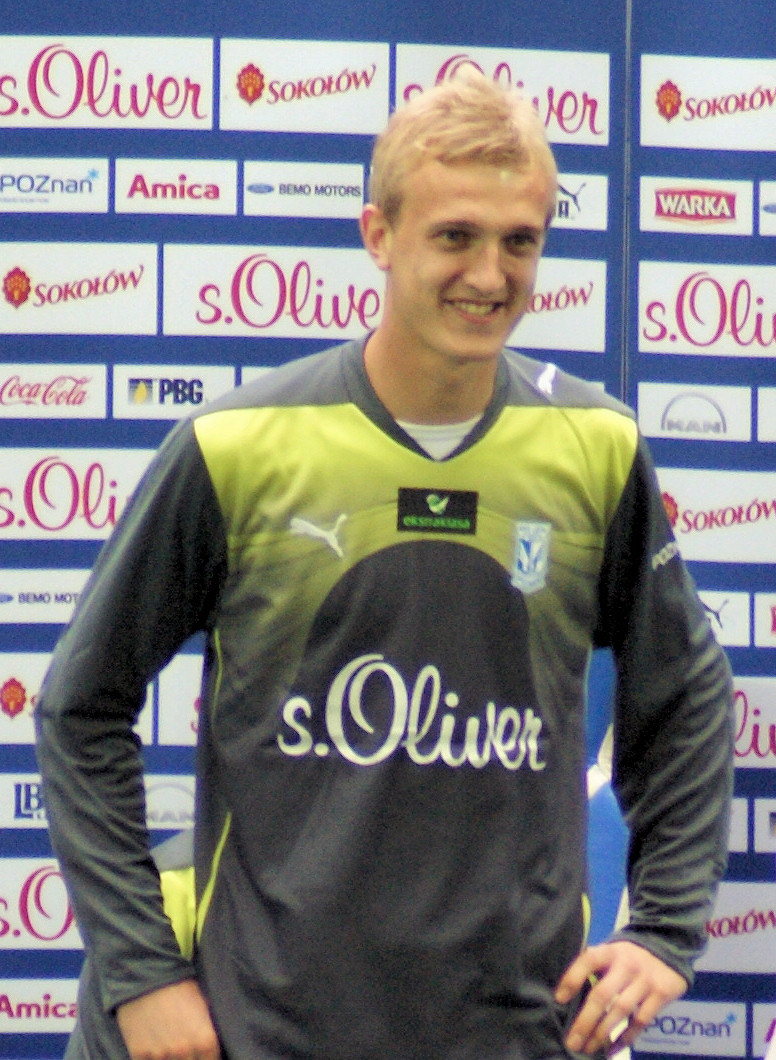
- Burić with Lech Poznań in 2010

Personal information
- Date of birth: 18 February 1987 (age 39)
- Place of birth: Zenica, SFR Yugoslavia
- Height: 1.95 m (6 ft 5 in)
- Position: Goalkeeper

Team information
- Current team: Zagłębie Lubin
- Number: 1

Youth career
- Čelik Zenica

Senior career*
Years	Team	Apps	(Gls)
2005–2009	Čelik Zenica	81	(0)
2009–2019	Lech Poznań	157	(0)
2013–2018	Lech Poznań II	11	(0)
2019–2021	Hapoel Haifa	40	(0)
2022–	Zagłębie Lubin	39	(0)
2022–	Zagłębie Lubin II	19	(0)

International career
2003	Bosnia and Herzegovina U17	3	(0)
2005	Bosnia and Herzegovina U19	2	(0)
2006–2008	Bosnia and Herzegovina U21	7	(0)
2008–2020	Bosnia and Herzegovina	3	(0)
- * Club domestic league appearances and goals as of 17:32, 29 May 2026 (UTC)

Jasmin Burić (pronounced [jǎsmin bûːritɕ]; born 18 February 1987) is a Bosnian professional footballer who plays as a goalkeeper for Ekstraklasa club Zagłębie Lubin.

Burić started his professional career at Čelik Zenica, before joining Lech Poznań in 2009. Ten years later, he moved to Hapoel Haifa. In 2022, he signed with Zagłębie Lubin.

A former youth international for Bosnia and Herzegovina, Burić made his senior international debut in 2008, earning 3 caps until 2020.

== Club career ==
=== Early career ===
Burić came through the youth academy of his hometown club Čelik Zenica. He made his professional debut in 2005 at the age of 18.

=== Lech Poznań ===
In January 2009, Burić was transferred to Polish team Lech Poznań for an undisclosed fee. He won his first trophy with the club on 19 May, by beating Ruch Chorzów in the Polish Cup final. On 18 October, he made his official debut for the side against Wisła Kraków.

In July 2012, he extended his contract with the squad until June 2016.

Burić played his 100th game for the team against Lechia Gdańsk on 25 July 2015.

In January 2016, he signed a new three-year deal with Lech.

He made his 200th appearance for the club on 10 March 2019 against Miedź Legnica.

=== Later stage of career ===
In June, Burić moved to Israeli outfit Hapoel Haifa.

In January 2022, he returned to Poland to join Zagłębie Lubin.

== International career ==
Burić represented Bosnia and Herzegovina at all youth levels.

In May 2008, he received his first senior call-up, for a friendly game against Azerbaijan, and debuted in that game on 1 June.

== Personal life ==
Burić married his long-time girlfriend Lejla in May 2016.

He possesses Polish passport since 2017.

== Career statistics ==
=== Club ===
As of match played 23 May 2026

Appearances and goals by club, season and competition
Club	Season	League			National cup (Note: Includes Bosnian Cup, Polish Cup, Israel State Cup)		League cup (Note: Includes Toto Cup)		Continental		Other		Total	
Club	Season	Division	Apps	Goals	Apps	Goals	Apps	Goals	Apps	Goals	Apps	Goals	Apps	Goals
Čelik Zenica	2004–05	Bosnian Premier League	1	0	0	0	—		—		—		1	0
Čelik Zenica	2005–06	Bosnian Premier League	19	0	0	0	—		—		—		19	0
Čelik Zenica	2006–07	Bosnian Premier League	28	0	6	0	—		—		—		34	0
Čelik Zenica	2007–08	Bosnian Premier League	28	0	2	0	—		—		—		30	0
Čelik Zenica	2008–09	Bosnian Premier League	5	0	0	0	—		1 (Note: Appearance in UEFA Intertoto Cup)	0	—		6	0
Čelik Zenica	Total		81	0	8	0	—		1	0	—		90	0
Lech Poznań	2009–10	Ekstraklasa	15	0	1	0	—		0	0	0	0	16	0
Lech Poznań	2010–11	Ekstraklasa	11	0	0	0	—		5 (Note: Appearance(s) in UEFA Europa League)	0	1 (Note: Appearance in Polish Super Cup)	0	17	0
Lech Poznań	2011–12	Ekstraklasa	17	0	3	0	—		—		—		20	0
Lech Poznań	2012–13	Ekstraklasa	22	0	0	0	—		4	0	—		26	0
Lech Poznań	2013–14	Ekstraklasa	0	0	0	0	—		1	0	—		1	0
Lech Poznań	2014–15	Ekstraklasa	11	0	3	0	—		3	0	—		17	0
Lech Poznań	2015–16	Ekstraklasa	35	0	5	0	—		11 (Note: Four appearances in UEFA Champions League, seven appearances in UEFA Europa League)	0	1	0	52	0
Lech Poznań	2016–17	Ekstraklasa	7	0	6	0	—		—		1	0	14	0
Lech Poznań	2017–18	Ekstraklasa	12	0	1	0	—		1	0	—		14	0
Lech Poznań	2018–19	Ekstraklasa	27	0	1	0	—		5	0	—		33	0
Lech Poznań	Total		157	0	20	0	—		30	0	3	0	210	0
Lech Poznań II	2013–14	III liga, gr. II	2	0	—		—		—		—		2	0
Lech Poznań II	2014–15	III liga, gr. II	6	0	—		—		—		—		2	0
Lech Poznań II	2016–17	III liga, gr. II	1	0	—		—		—		—		1	0
Lech Poznań II	2017–18	III liga, gr. II	1	0	—		—		—		—		1	0
Lech Poznań II	2018–19	III liga, gr. II	1	0	—		—		—		—		1	0
Lech Poznań II	Total		11	0	—		—		—		—		11	0
Hapoel Haifa	2019–20	Israeli Premier League	34	0	3	0	5	0	—		—		42	0
Hapoel Haifa	2020–21	Israeli Premier League	6	0	1	0	3	0	—		—		10	0
Hapoel Haifa	Total		40	0	4	0	8	0	—		—		52	0
Zagłębie Lubin	2021–22	Ekstraklasa	1	0	—		—		—		—		1	0
Zagłębie Lubin	2022–23	Ekstraklasa	5	0	2	0	—		—		—		7	0
Zagłębie Lubin	2023–24	Ekstraklasa	5	0	0	0	—		—		—		5	0
Zagłębie Lubin	2024–25	Ekstraklasa	4	0	3	0	—		—		—		7	0
Zagłębie Lubin	2025–26	Ekstraklasa	24	0	1	0	—		—		—		25	0
Zagłębie Lubin	Total		39	0	6	0	—		—		—		45	0
Zagłębie Lubin II	2022–23	II liga	8	0	—		—		—		—		8	0
Zagłębie Lubin II	2023–24	II liga	6	0	0	0	—		—		—		6	0
Zagłębie Lubin II	2024–25	II liga	5	0	0	0	—		—		—		5	0
Zagłębie Lubin II	Total		19	0	0	0	—		—		—		19	0
Career total			347	0	38	0	8	0	31	0	3	0	427	0

=== International ===
Appearances and goals by national team and year
National team	Year	Apps	Goals
Bosnia and Herzegovina
Bosnia and Herzegovina	2008	1	0
Bosnia and Herzegovina	2016	1	0
Bosnia and Herzegovina	2020	1	0
Total		3	0

== Honours ==
Lech Poznań

- Ekstraklasa: 2009–10, 2014–15
- Polish Cup: 2008–09
- Polish Super Cup: 2009, 2015, 2016

Lech Poznań II

- III liga, group II: 2018–19
