= Emmanuel Boateng (footballer, born 1997) =

Ghanaian footballer (born 1997)

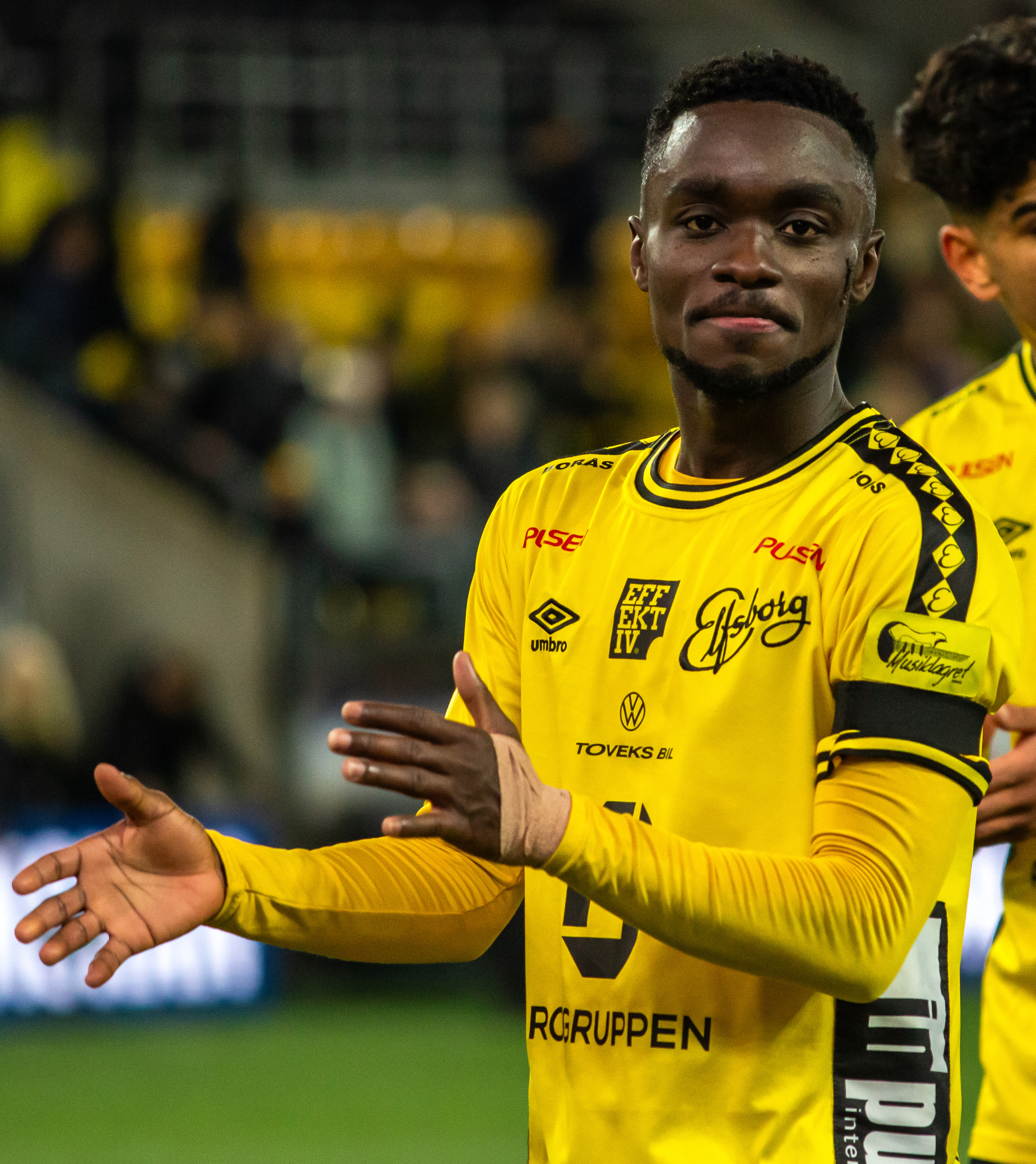

Personal information
- Date of birth: 17 June 1997 (age 29)
- Place of birth: Akwatia, Ghana
- Height: 1.75 m (5 ft 9 in)
- Position: Midfielder

Youth career
- WAFA

Senior career*
Years	Team	Apps	(Gls)
2016–2017	WAFA	43	(2)
2018	Aduana Stars	12	(0)
2018–2021	Hapoel Tel Aviv	69	(2)
2021–2024	IF Elfsborg	49	(1)
2024–2025	Konyaspor	10	(0)
- * Club domestic league appearances and goals as of 18 March 2026

Emmanuel Boateng (born 17 June 1997) is a Ghanaian professional footballer who plays as a midfielder, most recently for Konyaspor.

== Career ==
=== WAFA ===
Boateng grew up at the West African Football Academy (WAFA) from Ghana where he played until January 2018. He was one of the prominent players in the academy.

=== Aduana Stars ===
He signed with Aduana Stars during January 2018. Won the Ghana Super Cup with the team and recorded 14 appearances in the 2018 Ghanaian Premier League, and in the CAF Champions League.

=== Hapoel Tel Aviv ===
In September 2018, he started to train with the Israeli Premier League club Hapoel Tel Aviv and eventually signed for five years at the club after being scouted and recommended by US based Italian agent/scout Simone Ghirlanda of Pan American Calcio. In December 2018, he made his debut in the red uniform against the Bnei Sakhnin. He played 18 league games during the 2018–19 season, scored one important goal in the Tel Aviv derby and assisted three more goals.

=== Elfsborg ===
Emmanuel arrived in Borås 11 September 2021 and will be playing for the Swedish club located in the south west of Sweden, IF Elfsborg. IF Elfsborg is a club that missed Europa Conference League 2021 after a 3 goal-loss against the Dutch side Feyenoord in the play-off.

=== Konyaspor ===
On 16 January 2024, Boateng signed a two-and-a-half-year contract with Konyaspor in Turkey.

=== HJK Helsinki ===
On 27 February 2026, HJK Helsinki announced the signing of Boateng on a contract until the 2026 season, which also includes an option for the 2027 season. On 18 March 2026, HJK announced that Boateng's contract had been cancelled after he failed his medical.

== Career statistics ==
As of 20 May 2021

Appearances and goals by club, season and competition
Club	Season	League			Cup		Continental		Other		Total	
Club	Season	Division	Apps	Goals	Apps	Goals	Apps	Goals	Apps	Goals	Apps	Goals
WAFA	2016	Ghana Premier League	16	1							16	1
WAFA	2017	Ghana Premier League	27	1							27	1
WAFA	Total		43	2							43	2
Aduana Stars	2018	Ghana Premier League	12	0			2	0			14	0
Hapoel Tel Aviv	2018–19	Israeli Premier League	18	1	1	0	0	0	0	0	19	1
Hapoel Tel Aviv	2019–20	Israeli Premier League	26	0	3	1	0	0	0	0	29	1
Hapoel Tel Aviv	2020–21	Israeli Premier League	24	1	3	0	0	0	0	0	27	1
Hapoel Tel Aviv	Total		68	2	7	1	0	0	0	0	75	3
Career total			123	4	7	1	2	0	0	0	132	5

== Honours ==
Aduana Stars

- Ghana Super Cup: 2018
