= Gidi Kanyuk =

Israeli footballer

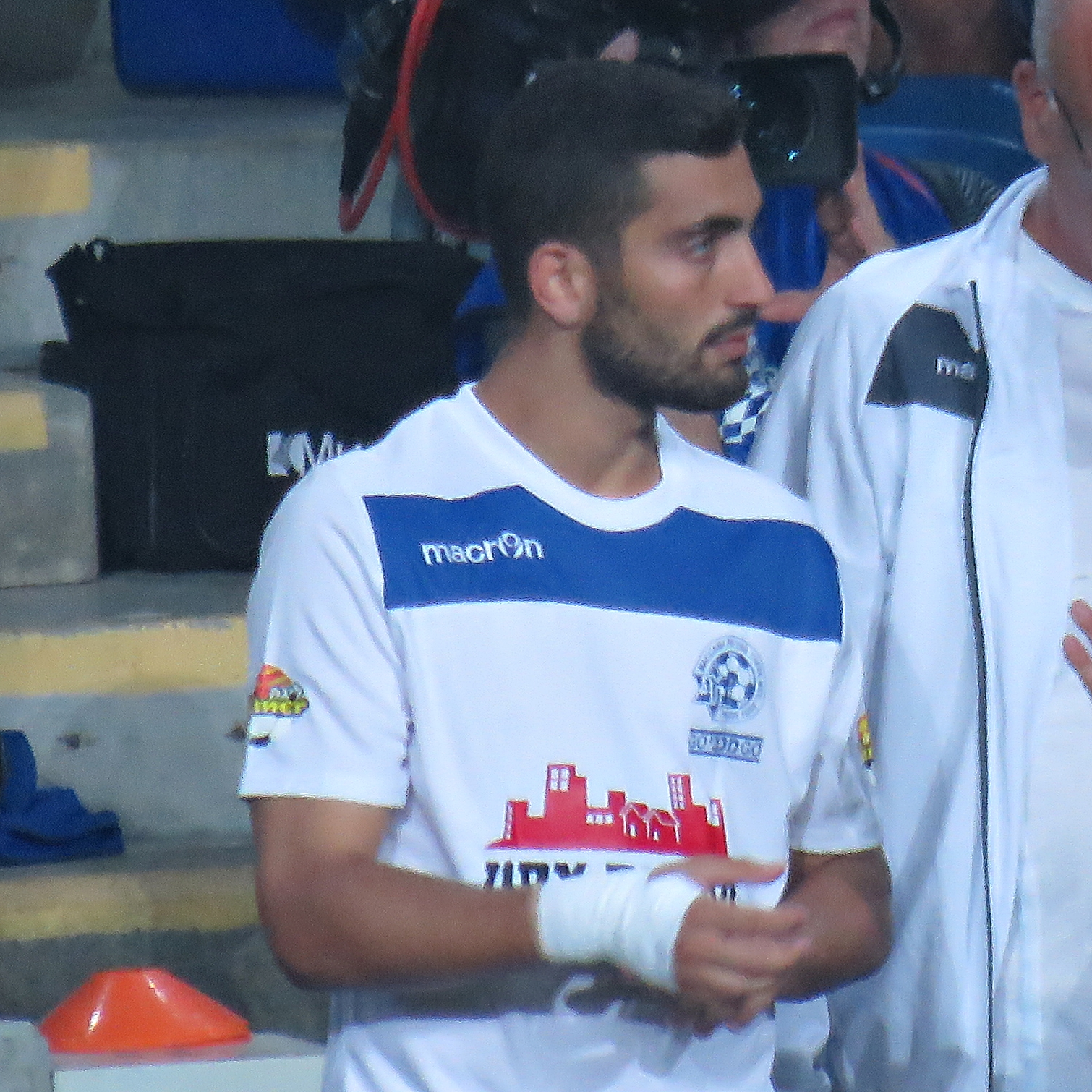

Personal information
- Full name: Gidi Kanyuk
- Date of birth: February 11, 1993 (age 33)
- Place of birth: Ramat Gan, Israel
- Height: 1.79 m (5 ft 10 1/2 in)
- Position: Attacking midfielder

Team information
- Current team: Bnei Eilat

Senior career*
Years	Team	Apps	(Gls)
2010–2017	Maccabi Petah Tikva	147	(19)
2017–2019	Pakhtakor Tashkent	14	(1)
2018	→ Maccabi Tel Aviv	5	(1)
2018–2019	→ Maccabi Petah Tikva	39	(7)
2019–2020	Hapoel Haifa	28	(4)
2020	Buriram United	10	(2)
2020–2021	Nakhon Ratchasima	14	(1)
2021–2022	Chonburi	26	(6)
2022–2023	Hapoel Haifa	20	(1)
2023–2026	Hapoel Ramat Gan	90	(17)
2026–	Bnei Eilat	1	(0)
- * Club domestic league appearances and goals as of 24 June 2026

Gidi Kanyuk (Hebrew: גידי קאניוק; born 11 February 1993) is an Israeli professional footballer who plays as an attacking midfielder for Liga Leumit club Bnei Eilat.

== Early life ==
Kanyuk was born in Ramat Gan, Israel, to an Ashkenazi Jewish family.
