= Ness Zamir =

Israeli footballer

Ness Zamir נס זמיר
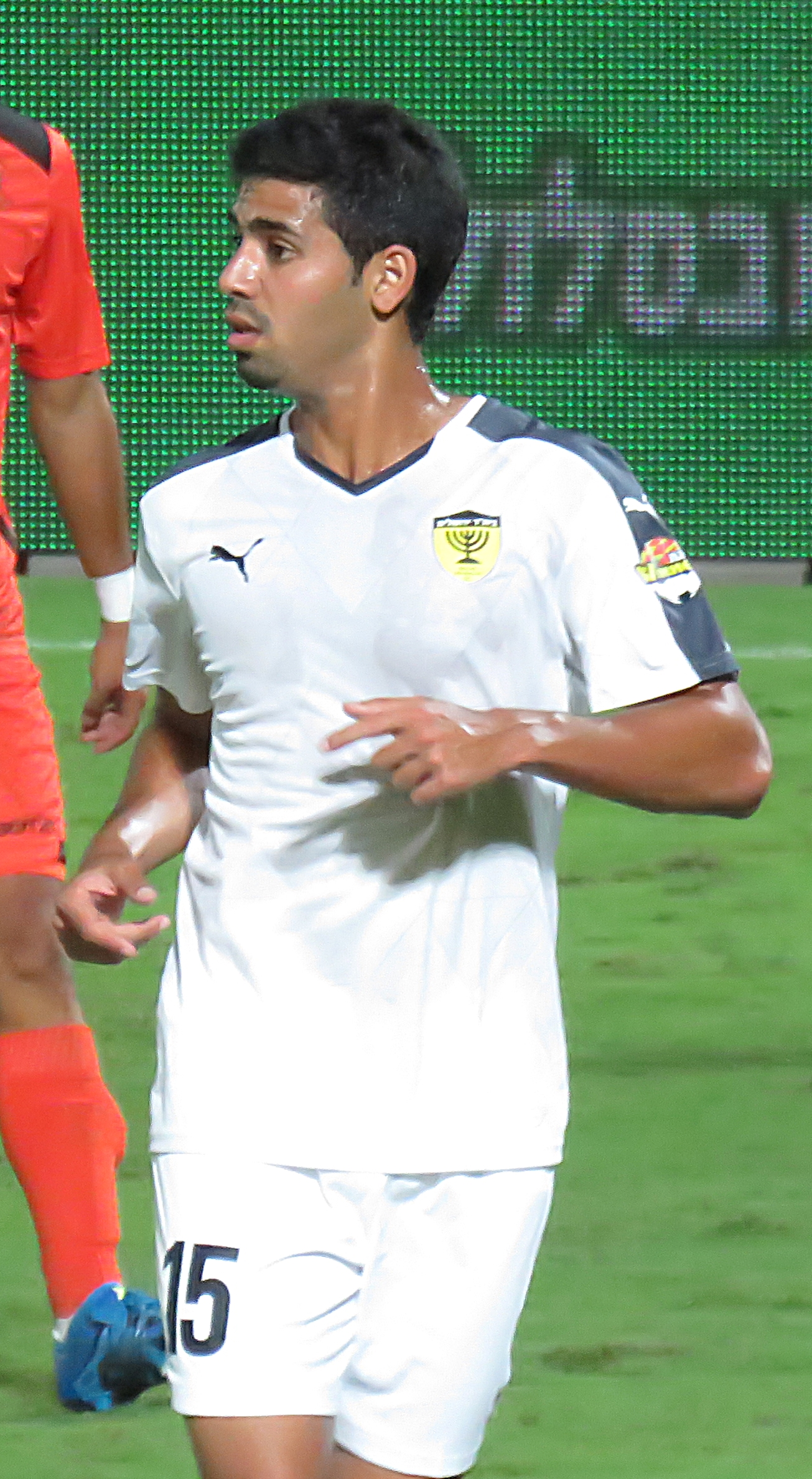
- Zamir playing for Beitar Jerusalem in 2015

Personal information
- Full name: Ness Nissim Zamir
- Date of birth: 31 October 1990 (age 36)
- Place of birth: Rishon LeZion, Israel
- Height: 1.78 m (5 ft 10 in)
- Position: Attacking midfielder

Team information
- Current team: Maccabi Amishav Petah Tikva
- Number: 26

Youth career
- 2006–2007: Gadna Yehuda
- 2007: Hapoel Tzafririm Holon
- 2007–2008: Beitar Nes Tubruk

Senior career*
Years	Team	Apps	(Gls)
2008	Beitar Nes Tubruk	9	(1)
2008–2009	Getafe B		
2009–2011	Albacete B		
2011–2012	Zaragoza B	6	(0)
2012	→ Maccabi Petah Tikva (loan)	9	(0)
2012–2015	Bnei Yehuda	66	(8)
2015–2016	Beitar Jerusalem	7	(0)
2016–2017	Hapoel Rishon LeZion	33	(9)
2017–2018	Hapoel Petah Tikva	29	(6)
2018–2022	Hapoel Haifa	101	(18)
2022–2023	Sektzia Ness Ziona	15	(0)
2023	Hapoel Hadera	2	(0)
2023–2024	Hapoel Rishon Lezion	9	(0)
2024–	Maccabi Amishav Petah Tikva	3	(2)

International career
2008–2013	Israel U21	12	(1)
- * Club domestic league appearances and goals as of 16 May 2025

Ness Nissim Zamir (Hebrew: נס ניסים זמיר; born 31 October 1990) is an Israeli professional footballer who plays for Israeli Premier League side Hapoel Rishon Lezion. Zamir also played for the Israel under-21 national football team.

== Club career ==
=== Early years ===
Zamir progressed through the youth ranks of clubs in Israel. When he was only 17 years old, Zamir had a trial with Getafe B, which decided to sign him on a professional contract. After playing there in the Segunda División B Groups 1–4, Zamir signed with Albacete B. A number of great games drew the attraction of some La Liga clubs such as Atlético Madrid, with whom he agreed terms on a multi-year contract. However, the transfer was put on hold and eventually avoided due to issues with Zamir receiving recognition from the IDF allowing him to be exempt from compulsory military service as an 'elite athlete'. Zamir is also awaiting a Spanish passport.

=== Real Zaragoza ===
On 28 July 2011, Zamir signed with Real Zaragoza on a four-year contract. A key factor in Zamir's decision to sign with Zaragoza was that their football director, Juan Esnáider, knew Zamir well from when he was an assistant coach at Getafe.

=== Maccabi Petah Tikva ===
On 30 January 2012, due to his continued failure to receive the status as an 'elite athlete' from the IDF, Zamir signed on a four-month loan deal with Israeli Premier League side Maccabi Petah Tikva. It was hoped that this move would satisfy the military authorities as to Zamir's abilities and pave the way for him to become an 'elite athlete'. On 4 February 2012, Zamir made his debut for Petah Tikva as an 80th-minute substitute in their league match against Maccabi Tel Aviv. Zamir played a key role in Petah Tikva's second goal, which turned out to be the winning goal in the 2–1 result.

=== Hapoel Haifa ===
Zamir signed for Hapoel Haifa in July 2018.

== International career ==
On 23 March 2011, Zamir made his debut for the Israel under-21 national football team in a friendly tournament against Georgia in the Austrian town of Sankt Veit. He came on as a 57th-minute substitute for Mohammad Ghadir, scoring six minutes into his debut. Israel won this match 2–0.
