= Boubacar Traorè (footballer, born 1997) =

Senegalese footballer

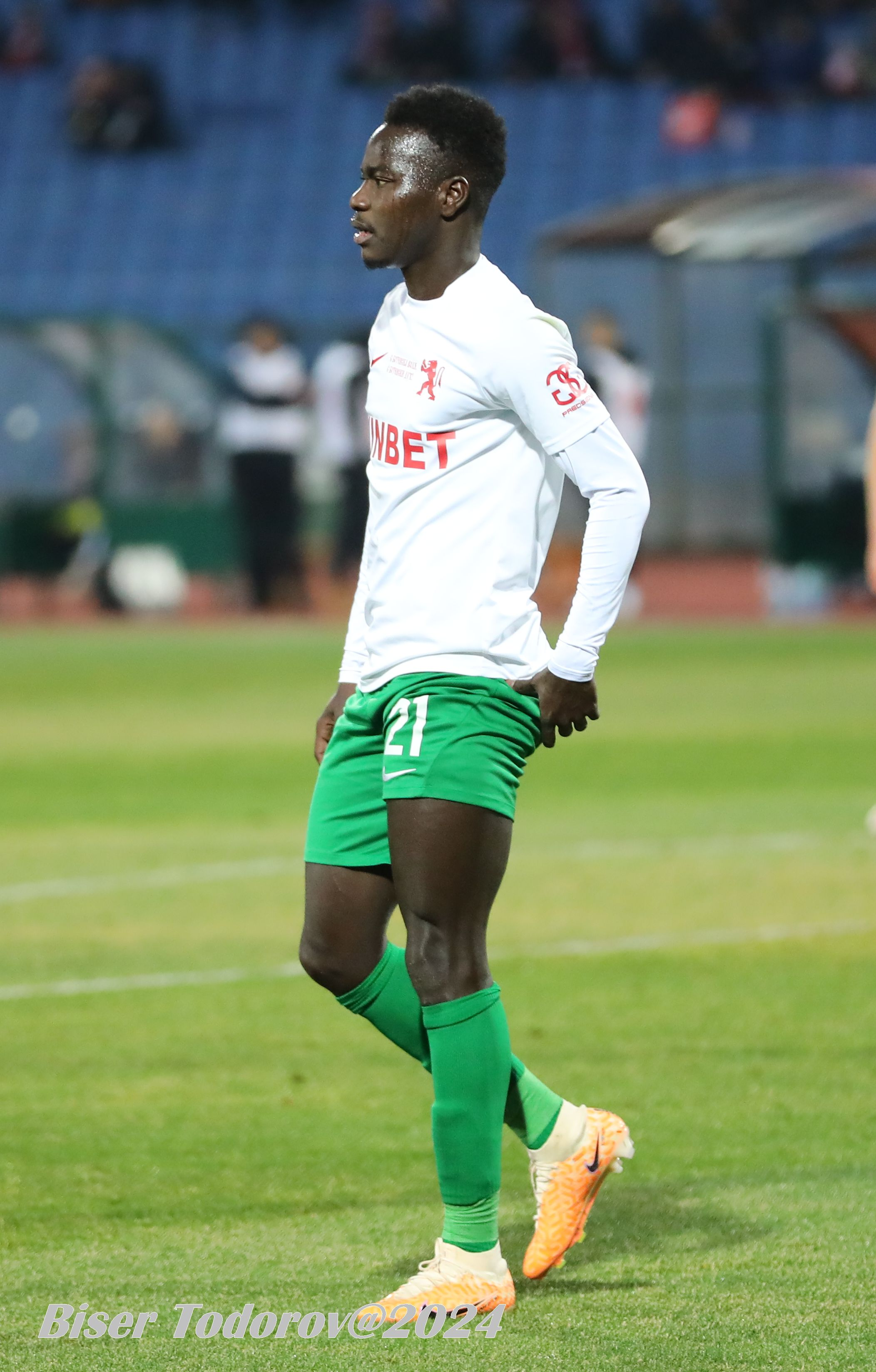

Personal information
- Full name: Boubacar Faye Traorè
- Date of birth: 26 July 1997 (age 29)
- Place of birth: Kaolack, Senegal
- Position: Left-back

Team information
- Current team: Khorazm
- Number: 97

Youth career
- –2017: Tuttocuoio
- 2016–2017: → Torino (loan)

Senior career*
Years	Team	Apps	(Gls)
2015–2017	Tuttocuoio	2	(0)
2018	Tarxien Rainbows	5	(1)
2018–2019	Teuta Durrës	23	(3)
2019–2020	Hapoel Kfar Saba	30	(3)
2020–2022	St. Gallen	35	(0)
2022	Metalist Kharkiv	0	(0)
2023	Beroe Stara Zagora	7	(0)
2023–2025	Botev Vratsa	50	(5)
2026–	Khorazm	12	(1)
- * Club domestic league appearances and goals as of 29 July 2026

Boubacar Traorè (born 26 July 1997) is a Senegalese professional footballer who plays as a defender for Uzbekistan Super League club Khorazm.

== Career statistics ==
=== Club ===
As of 20 August 2020

Club	Season	League			Cup		Continental		Other		Total	
Club	Season	Division	Apps	Goals	Apps	Goals	Apps	Goals	Apps	Goals	Apps	Goals
Tuttocuoio	2015–16	Lega Pro	2	0	0	0	–		0	0	2	0
Tarxien Rainbows	2017–18	Maltese Premier League	5	1	0	0	–		0	0	5	1
Teuta Durrës	2018–19	Albanian Superliga	23	3	2	1	–		0	0	14	1
Hapoel Kfar Saba	2019–20	Israeli Premier League	30	3	1	0	–		2	0	33	3
FC St. Gallen	2020–21	Swiss Super League	0	0	0	0	–		0	0	0	0
Career total			60	7	3	1	0	0	2	0	54	5
