= Ben Vehava =

Israeli footballer

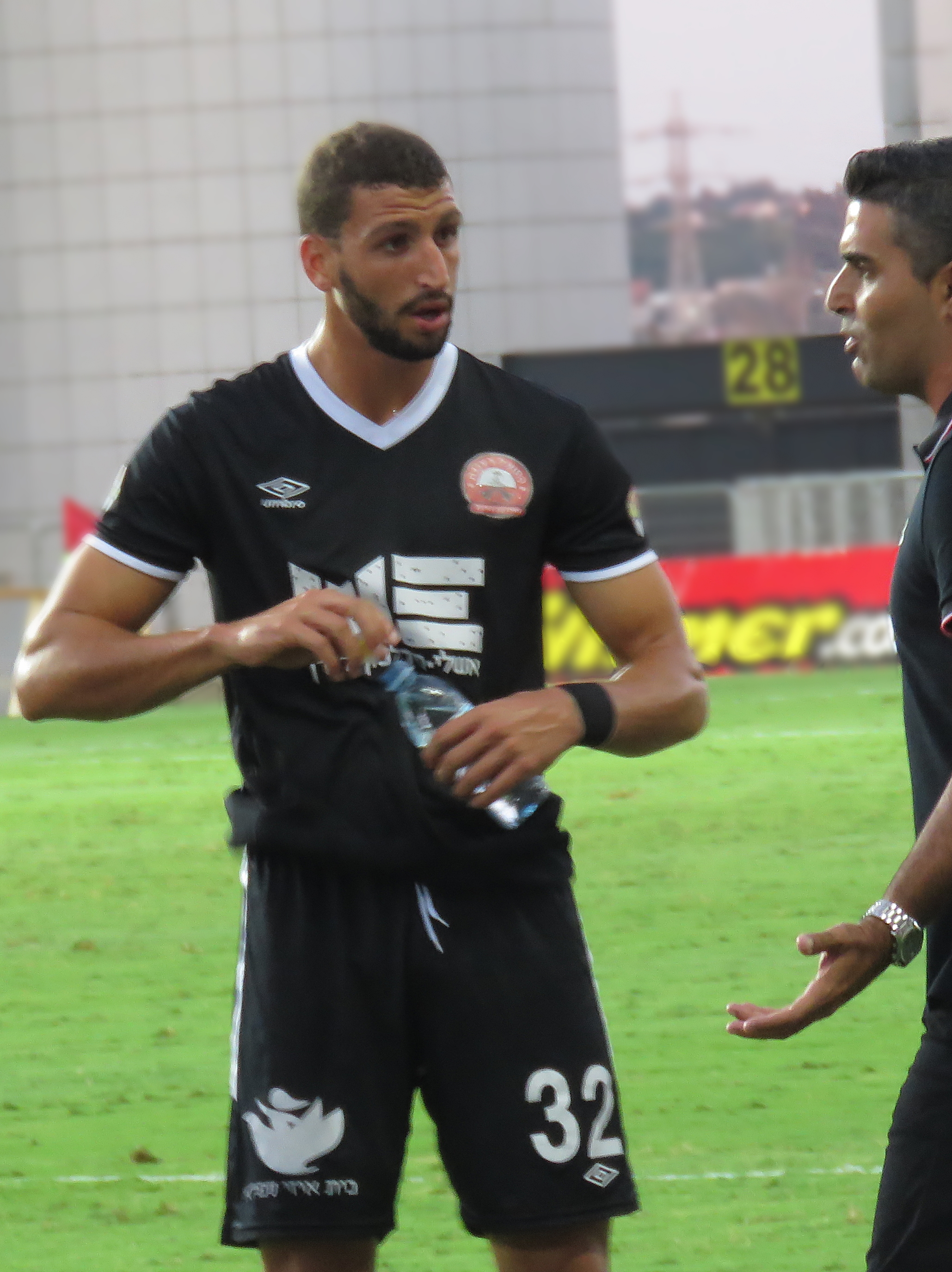
- Vehava playing for Hapoel Ra'anana in 2015

Personal information
- Full name: Ben Vehava
- Date of birth: 27 March 1992 (age 34)
- Place of birth: Netanya, Israel
- Height: 1.85 m (6 ft 1 in)
- Position: Center-back

Team information
- Current team: Ironi Tiberias
- Number: 23

Youth career
- Beitar Nes Tubruk

Senior career*
Years	Team	Apps	(Gls)
2011–2012	Ironi Kiryat Shmona	4	(1)
2012–2013	Hapoel Be'er Sheva	11	(0)
2013–2014	Bnei Yehuda	11	(0)
2014–2019	Hapoel Ra'anana	143	(6)
2019–2022	Hapoel Haifa	60	(0)
2022–2025	Ironi Tiberias	98	(2)
2025–2026	Maccabi Petah Tikva	25	(0)
2026–	Hapoel Afula	0	(0)

International career
2011–2014	Israel U21	19	(1)
- * Club domestic league appearances and goals as of 24 June 2026

Ben Vehava (Hebrew: בן והבה; born 27 March 1992), also called Ben Wa'aba or Ben Vahaba, is an Israeli footballer who plays for Hapoel Afula as a defender.
