= Kevin Tapoko =

French footballer (born 1994)

Personal information
- Full name: Kevin Guy-Noel Pierre Tapoko
- Date of birth: 13 April 1994 (age 32)
- Place of birth: Laval, France
- Height: 1.97 m (6 ft 6 in)
- Position: Midfielder

Team information
- Current team: AS Vitré

Youth career
- 2005–2009: Laval
- 2009–2011: Lyon
- 2011–2012: Le Mans

Senior career*
Years	Team	Apps	(Gls)
2012–2013	Lausanne	2	(0)
2013–2015	Dessel	24	(2)
2015–2016	OH Leuven	10	(1)
2016	Royal Excel Mouscron	1	(0)
2016–2017	RWS Bruxelles	3	(0)
2017–2018	Panionios	19	(2)
2018	Aris Limassol	5	(0)
2018–2019	Hapoel Hadera	18	(1)
2019–2021	Hapoel Be'er Sheva	7	(0)
2019–2020	→ Hapoel Haifa (loan)	22	(1)
2020–2021	→ Grenoble (loan)	26	(1)
2021–2022	Hapoel Haifa	13	(1)
2022	→ Beroe (loan)	7	(0)
2022–2024	Laval	22	(0)
2024	AS Vita Club		
2025	Panachaiki	2	(0)
2025–	AS Vitré	8	(0)

International career
2010	France U16	3	(0)
- * Club domestic league appearances and goals as of 24 January 2026

Kevin Guy-Noel Pierre Tapoko (born 13 April 1994) is a French professional footballer who plays as a midfielder for AS Vitré.

== Club career ==
=== Early career ===
Tapoko initially started his footballing career with hometown club Laval but moved on to Lyon where he would go on to spend two years as an academy player. In 2011, he transferred to Le Mans where he featured for the club's reserve team before leaving at the end of the season.

In August 2012 Tapoko moved abroad to Swiss Super League club Lausanne on a free transfer. He made his league debut for Lausanne on 16 March 2013 in a 3–1 away loss against St. Gallen, coming on as a substitute for the final 12 minutes. During the 2012–13 season, Tapoko also featured for the reserve team and went on trial with Watford in England Championship.

Ahead of the 2013–14 season, Tapoko signed for two years with Belgian Second Division side Dessel. He went on to play for two teams from the Belgian Pro League, OH Leuven and Royal Excel Mouscron. After that he also had a short spell with RWS Bruxelles, playing at the third level of Belgian football.

On 14 January 2017, Tapoko signed a contract till the end of the 2016–17 season with Greek club Panionios of the Super League Greece. In January 2018 he moved to Aris Limassol of the Cypriot First Division. On 12 June 2018, Tapoko returned to the Super League Greece, signing a contract with Apollon Smyrnis. He was released after a very short time.

=== In Israel ===
On 20 August 2018, ahead of the 2018–19 Israeli Premier League, Tapoko signed with Hapoel Hadera of the Israeli Premier League. On 18 August 2018, he made his debut in a 2–1 win over Ashdod in the Toto Cup at Yud-Alef Stadium. On 25 August, Tapoko made his debut in a 1–2 win over Hapoel Tel Aviv in the Israeli Premier League at Netanya Stadium. On 28 October, Tapoko scored his first goal in a 2–3 win over Ashdod in the Israeli Premier League at Netanya Stadium.

On 4 January 2019, Tapoko signed with Hapoel Be'er Sheva for three and a half years. As part of the deal it was agreed that the player would move to Hapoel Be'er Sheva on 13 January, after Hapoel Hadera's match against Bnei Sakhnin on 12 January at Netanya Stadium.

In May 2020 Tapoko as signed a deal to be loaned out to Grenoble playing in the Ligue 2 for the 2020–21 season.

On 5 September 2021, he returned to Hapoel Haifa on a permanent basis.

=== Return to France ===
On 21 June 2022, Tapoko signed with Laval.

== International career ==
Tapoko was a France youth international, having previously competed at France national under-16 team. In 2010, he was part of the France national under-16 team that played at the 2010 Montaigu Tournament, finishing in third place.

== Personal life ==
Born in France, Tapoko is the son of the Cameroon international footballer Guy-Noël Tapoko. He holds French and Cameroonian nationalities.
