= Nikola Gulan =

Serbian footballer

Nikola Gulan Никола Гулан
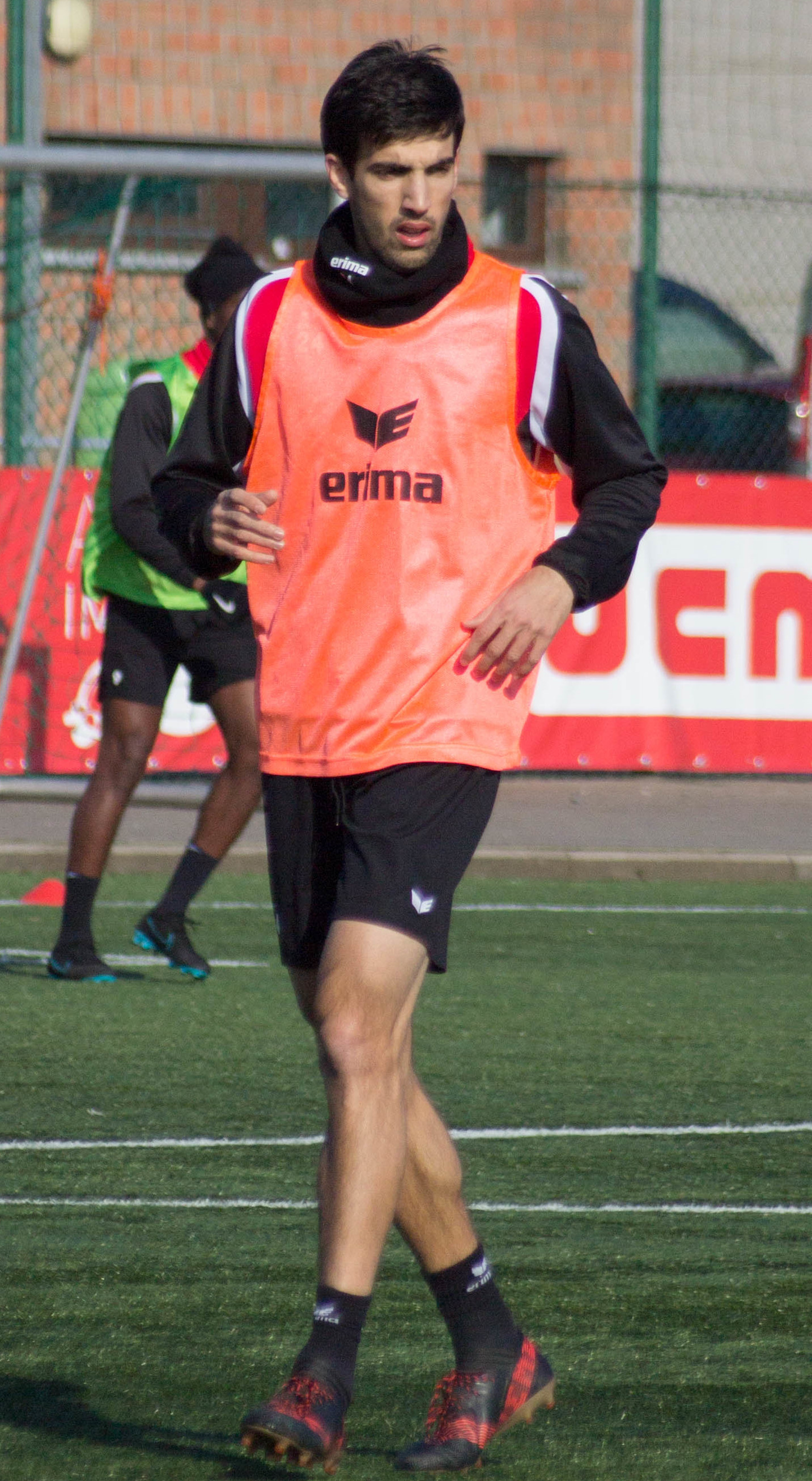
- Gulan training with Royal Excel Mouscron in February 2018

Personal information
- Full name: Nikola Gulan
- Date of birth: 23 March 1989 (age 37)
- Place of birth: Belgrade, SFR Yugoslavia
- Height: 1.83 m (6 ft 0 in)
- Positions: Left back; centre back; midfielder

Youth career
- Partizan

Senior career*
Years	Team	Apps	(Gls)
2006–2007	Partizan	18	(0)
2007–2012	Fiorentina	9	(0)
2008	→ Sampdoria (loan)	0	(0)
2009	→ 1860 Munich (loan)	3	(0)
2009–2010	→ Empoli (loan)	25	(0)
2012–2012	→ Chievo (loan)	1	(0)
2012–2013	Modena	20	(0)
2013–2014	Partizan	12	(0)
2014–2015	Mallorca	29	(0)
2015–2017	Royal Excel Mouscron	35	(0)
2017–2019	Royal Excel Mouscron	30	(0)
2019–2020	Hapoel Haifa	25	(0)
2020–2021	BK Häcken	4	(0)
2022	Balzan	7	(0)
2022–2023	Radnički Beograd	14	(1)
2023	Kolubara	9	(0)

International career
2007–2010	Serbia U21	22	(0)
- * Club domestic league appearances and goals as of 26 December 2023

Nikola Gulan (Serbian Cyrillic: Никола Гулан; born 23 March 1989) is a Serbian professional footballer who plays as a defender or midfielder.

He was part of the European selection that won the 2007 Meridian Cup in Barcelona. Europe triumphed over Africa, winning 10–1 on aggregate. They won the first leg 6–1 and the second leg 4–0.

Gulan competed for Serbia at the 2008 Summer Olympics.

== Club career ==
Born in Belgrade, Gulan graduated from FK Partizan's youth system, and made his senior debuts in the 2006–07 campaign, aged only 17. On 4 August 2007, he signed a four-year deal with Italian Serie A side Fiorentina, for a €2.8 million fee.

Gulan was unable to register as a Fiorentina player, as the club had no non-EU registration quota, and then was loaned to fellow league side Sampdoria in January 2008, as a replacement to FC Rostov-bound Ivan Živanović. He subsequently returned to the Viola in June, after only appearing once on the bench in a 1–1 home draw against Cagliari on 22 March.

On 2 February 2009, Gulan joined TSV 1860 Munich on loan until the end of the 2008–09 season. He played his first match for the club on 12 April, starting in a 2–3 away loss against TuS Koblenz for the 2. Bundesliga championship; he appeared in further two matches, as his side finished 12th.

Gulan moved to Empoli in August 2009, also in a temporary deal. He appeared in 25 matches during the season, being also converted as a right back in the process.

He subsequently returned to Fiorentina, and appeared in his first Serie A match on 26 September 2010, coming on as a second half substitute in a 2–0 home win against Parma. He started his first match in the competition on 17 October, in a 1–2 away loss against former side Sampdoria.

In January 2012, Gulan was loaned to Chievo until June. After appearing in only ten minutes, he joined Modena in a season-long loan deal.

After the loan with Modena expired, Gulan rescinded with Fiorentina and returned to his former club FK Partizan, signing a two-year contract on 28 June 2013. He was released by the club in July 2014, and joined RCD Mallorca on 1 September.
