= Ramaric Etou =

Association football player (1995-)

Romaric Etou
Personal information
- Full name: Romaric Presley Etou-Thomaso
- Date of birth: 25 January 1995 (age 31)
- Place of birth: Brazzaville, Republic of the Congo
- Height: 1.73 m (5 ft 8 in)
- Position: Defender

Team information
- Current team: Dila Gori
- Number: 33

Senior career*
Years	Team	Apps	(Gls)
2012–2013	Léopards		
2013–2016	Beitar Tel Aviv Ramla	81	(2)
2016–2017	Dila Gori	24	(1)
2017–2019	Beitar Tel Aviv Ramla	69	(6)
2019–2020	Sektzia Ness Ziona	19	(0)
2020–	Dila Gori	118	(5)

International career
2011	Congo U17	8	(0)
2017–	Congo	4	(0)
- * Club domestic league appearances and goals as of 10 December 2025

Ramaric Etou (born 25 January 1995) is a Congolese footballer who plays for Dila Gori and Congo national football team as a defender.

Etou was first introduced by Dila in September 2016. He left the club for Israel the next season only to come back in early 2020. Following the departure of Nika Gagnidze in 2024, Etou was selected as a team captain.
