= 2020–21 Maccabi Tel Aviv F.C. season =

Maccabi Tel Aviv
2020–21 season
- Chairman: Mitchell Goldhar
- Manager: Georgios Donis (until 22 December); Patrick van Leeuwen (from 24 December)
- Stadium: Bloomfield Stadium, Tel Aviv
- Premier League: 2nd
- State Cup: Winners
- Toto Cup: Winners
- Super Cup: Winners
- Champions League: Play-off round
- Europa League: Round of 32
- Top goalscorer: League: Yonatan Cohen; Aleksandar Pešić (10 each); All: Yonatan Cohen (14 goals)
Home colours	Away colours	Third colours

The 2020–21 season was Maccabi Tel Aviv's 114th season since its establishment in 1906 and 73rd since the establishment of the State of Israel. During the 2020–21 campaign, the club competed in the Israeli Premier League, State Cup, Toto Cup, UEFA Champions League and UEFA Europa League.

== Squad ==
As of August 5, 2020

No.	Pos.	Nation	Player
1	GK	ISR	Daniel Peretz
2	DF	ISR	Ben Bitton (on loan from (Israel) Hapoel Be'er Sheva)
3	DF	ISR	Matan Baltaxa
4	DF	ESP	Enric Saborit
6	MF	ISR	Dan Glazer
9	FW	BRB	Nick Blackman
10	FW	ISR	Itay Shechter
11	FW	ISR	Tal Ben Haim
17	MF	ISR	Dan Biton (on loan from (Bulgaria) Ludogorets)
18	DF	ISR	Eitan Tibi
19	GK	BRA	Daniel Tenenbaum
21	DF	ISR	Sheran Yeini (Captain)
22	MF	ISR	Avi Rikan
23	MF	ISR	Eyal Golasa
24	FW	ISR	Yonatan Cohen
25	DF	ISR	Amit Glazer

No.	Pos.	Nation	Player
27	DF	ISR	Ofir Davidzada
29	FW	ISR	Eylon Almog
30	DF	ISR	Maor Kandil
31	DF	ISR	Shahar Piven
32	FW	ISR	Dor Turgeman
34	MF	ISR	Bar Cohen
36	MF	ISR	Ido Shahar
38	FW	ISR	Ronen Hanchis
39	FW	PAN	Eduardo Guerrero
41	GK	ISR	Ben Musayof
42	MF	ISR	Dor Peretz
45	FW	ISR	Matan Hozez
47	MF	ISR	Eden Karzev
70	MF	SRB	Uroš Nikolić
77	MF	ISR	Ruslan Barsky

== Competitions ==
=== Israeli Premier League ===
==== League table ====
Pos	Team	Pld	W	D	L	GF	GA	GD	Pts	Qualification	MHA	MTA	ASH	HBS	MPT	IKS
1	Maccabi Haifa (C)	36	24	7	5	72	29	+43	79	Qualification for the Champions League first qualifying round	—	1–1	2–0	3–2	1–1	4–0
2	Maccabi Tel Aviv	36	21	12	3	65	33	+32	75	Qualification for the Europa Conference League second qualifying round (Note: Since the 2020–21 Israel State Cup winners, Maccabi Tel Aviv, qualified for the Europa Conference League via league position, the last Europa Conference League berth was awarded to the fourth-placed team.)	2–2	—	1–1	2–1	3–1	2–2
3	F.C. Ashdod	36	15	9	12	48	39	+9	54	Qualification for the Europa Conference League second qualifying round	0–3	1–2	—	2–2	0–0	1–1
4	Hapoel Be'er Sheva	36	11	15	10	45	43	+2	48	Qualification for the Europa Conference League second qualifying round	1–1	1–1	1–2	—	2–0	3–2
5	Maccabi Petah Tikva	36	13	7	16	32	38	−6	46		1–2	0–3	1–3	0–0	—	2–0
6	Ironi Kiryat Shmona	36	12	10	14	37	45	−8	46		1–1	2–0	1–1	1–1	1–2	—

Source: Soccerway
Legend: Blue = home team win; Yellow = draw; Red = away team win.
Rules for classification: 1) Points; 2) Goal difference; 3) Matches won; 4) Goals scored; 5) Head-to-head points; 6) Head-to-head goal difference; 7) Head-to-head goals scored; 8) Play-off.
(C) Champions

==== Results summary ====
Overall								Home						Away					
Pld	W	D	L	GF	GA	GD	Pts	W	D	L	GF	GA	GD	W	D	L	GF	GA	GD
36	21	12	3	65	33	+32	75	10	7	1	35	19	+16	11	5	2	30	14	+16

Last updated: 30 May 2021.

==== Results by matchday ====
Matchday	1	2	3	4	5	6	7	8	9	10	11	12	13	14	15	16	17	18	19	20	21	22	23	24	25	26	27	28	29	30	31	32	33	34	35	36
Ground	H	A	H	A	H	A	A	H	A	H	A	H	A	A	H	A	H	A	H	H	A	H	A	H	A	H	H	A	H	H	A	A	H	A	A	H
Result	L	D	D	D	D	W	W	W	L	W	D	W	W	W	D	W	W	W	W	W	W	W	W	W	W	D	W	D	W	D	L	D	D	W	W	D
Position	9	9	5	10	8	6	4	4	8	7	5	3	2	2	2	2	2	2	2	2	2	2	2	1	1	2	1	1	1	2	2	2	2	2	2	2

A = Away; H = Home; W = Win; D = Draw; L = Loss

==== Matches ====
30 August 2020 1	Maccabi Tel Aviv	1–2	Maccabi Petah Tikva	Tel Aviv
11:00 IST (UTC+3)	Saborit (yellow card) 30'; Shechter 83'	Report	(yellow card) 33' Abada; 48' Eliyahu; (yellow card) 74' Cohen; 85' Abada; (yellow card) 90' Sarsur; (yellow card) 90' Yanko	Stadium: Bloomfield Stadium; Attendance: 0 Referee: Eitan Shmuelevic

12 September 2020 2	Bnei Yehuda	2–2	Maccabi Tel Aviv	Tel Aviv
20:30 IST (UTC+3)	Allyson (yellow card) 6'; Mori (yellow card) 9'; Jan 21'; Jan (yellow card) 73'; Allyson 89'	Report	Ben Bitton (yellow card) 64'; Kandil 80'; Shechter 83'	Stadium: Bloomfield Stadium; Attendance: 0 Referee: David Fucsman

16 December 2020 3	Maccabi Tel Aviv	2–2	Maccabi Netanya	Tel Aviv
20:45 IST (UTC+3)	Cohen (yellow card) 35', (goal) 79'; Golasa 53'	Report	Frater 30', (yellow card) 51'; Jaber (yellow card) 48'; Azulay 66'	Stadium: Bloomfield Stadium; Attendance: 0 Referee: Erez Pappir

2 November 2020 4	Maccabi Haifa	2–2	Maccabi Tel Aviv	Haifa
21:00 IST (UTC+3)	Chery 7'; Rukavytsya 8'; Rodríguez (yellow card) 21'; Mabouka (yellow card) 58'; Arad (yellow card) 86'; Abu Fani (yellow card) 86'	Report	Golasa (yellow card) 29'; Guerrero 38'; Cohen 70'; Peretz (yellow card) 90'	Stadium: Sammy Ofer Stadium; Attendance: 0 Referee: Eli Hacmon

25 October 2020 5	Maccabi Tel Aviv	0–0	Hapoel Be'er Sheva	Tel Aviv
21:00 IST (UTC+3)	Saborit (yellow card) 37'; Karzev (yellow card) 45'; Kandil (yellow card) 83'	Report	Josué (yellow card) 83'	Stadium: Bloomfield Stadium; Attendance: 0 Referee: Erez Pappir

8 November 2020 6	Bnei Sakhnin	1–2	Maccabi Tel Aviv	Sakhnin
20:15 IST (UTC+3)	Utin (yellow card) 41'; Khalaila 90+6' (pen.)	Report	Cohen 31' (pen.); Saborit (yellow card) 43'; Kandil (yellow card) 54'; Pešić 67'; Karzev (yellow card) 90+3'	Stadium: Doha Stadium; Attendance: 0 Referee: Gal Leibovitz

22 November 2020 7	Hapoel Hadera	0–1	Maccabi Tel Aviv	Netanya
20:00 IST (UTC+3)	Glazer (yellow card) 56'; Tabachnik (yellow card) 84'	Report	Khattab 30' (o.g.); Pešić (yellow card) 45'; Peretz (yellow card) 84'	Stadium: Netanya Stadium; Attendance: 0 Referee: Roi Reinshreiber

29 November 2020 8	Maccabi Tel Aviv	3–0	Hapoel Kfar Saba	Tel Aviv
20:45 IST (UTC+3)	Ben Haim (yellow card) 56'; Pešić 38'; Biton 45+1'; Cohen 52'; Schechter (yellow card) 90' (yellow-red card)	Report	Khattab 30' (o.g.); Pešić (yellow card) 45'; Peretz (yellow card) 84'	Stadium: Bloomfield Stadium; Attendance: 0 Referee: Daniel Bar Natan

7 December 2020 9	Ashdod	3–2	Maccabi Tel Aviv	Ashdod
20:00 IST (UTC+3)	Bayo 20'; Kana'an (yellow card) 24'; Gordana (yellow card) 53'; Azulai 69', (yellow card) 90+1'; Jehezekel 80', (yellow card) 83'	Report	Daniel Peretz (yellow card) 19'; Hernández 53', (yellow card) 87'; Cohen 61'	Stadium: Yud Alef Stadium; Attendance: 0 Referee: Snir Levi

13 December 2020 10	Maccabi Tel Aviv	4–3	Hapoel Haifa	Tel Aviv
20:45 IST (UTC+3)	Cohen 33', 90+5' (pen.); Glazer (yellow card) 40'; Pešić 59'; Rikan 89', (yellow card) 90+4'	Report	21' (pen.) Erel; 27' Maman; (yellow card) 55' Vahaba; (yellow card) 82' Siroshtein; 87' Fadida; (yellow card) 90+4' Mishpati; (yellow card) 90+6' Altman	Stadium: Bloomfield Stadium; Attendance: 0 Referee: David Fuchsman

21 December 2020 11	Beitar Jerusalem	0–0	Maccabi Tel Aviv	Jerusalem
20:45 IST (UTC+3)	Vered (yellow card) 24'; Zargary (yellow card) 37'; Dgani (yellow card) 79'	Report	(yellow card) 10' Saborit; (yellow card) 90' Peretz	Stadium: Teddy Stadium; Attendance: 0 Referee: Orel Greenfeld

24 December 2020 12	Maccabi Tel Aviv	1–0	Hapoel Ironi Kiryat Shmona	Tel Aviv
20:00 IST (UTC+3)	Glazer (yellow card) 90'; Schechter (yellow card) 90+2'; Biton 90+5' (pen.)	Report	(yellow card) 28' Hofmeister; (yellow card) 39' Ben-Shimon; (yellow card) 76' Broun	Stadium: Bloomfield Stadium; Attendance: 0 Referee: Snir Levy

28 December 2020 13	Hapoel Tel Aviv	0–4	Maccabi Tel Aviv	Tel Aviv
20:45 IST (UTC+3)	Gruper (yellow card) 49'	Report	(yellow card) 21' Glazer; 61' Peretz; 62' Pešić; 74' Almog; 90' Cohen	Stadium: Bloomfield Stadium; Attendance: 0 Referee: Liran Liani

4 January 2021 14	Maccabi Petah Tikva	0–1	Maccabi Tel Aviv	Petah Tikva
20:45 IST (UTC+3)	Baribo (yellow card) 83'; Levi (yellow card) 90+4'	Report	51', (yellow card) 70' Karzev	Stadium: HaMoshava Stadium; Attendance: 0 Referee: Gal Leibovich

7 January 2021 15	Maccabi Tel Aviv	0–0	Bnei Yehuda Tel Aviv	Tel Aviv
20:45 IST (UTC+3)	Peretz (yellow card) 79'	Report		Stadium: Bloomfield Stadium; Attendance: 0 Referee: Aviad Shiloah

23 January 2021 16	Maccabi Netanya	1–3	Maccabi Tel Aviv	Netanya
20:45 IST (UTC+3)	Sade (yellow card) 36'; Akinyemi (yellow card) 44'; Cohen (yellow card) 68'; Frater 81'; Azubel (yellow card) 88'	Report	24' Cohen; (yellow card) 29' Yeini; 38' Peretz; (yellow card) 63' Ben Haim; 79' Guerrero; (yellow card) 90' Piven	Stadium: Netanya Stadium; Attendance: 0 Referee: Eitan Shmuelevic

27 January 2021 17	Maccabi Tel Aviv	2–1	Maccabi Haifa	Tel Aviv
20:45 IST (UTC+3)	Ben Haim (yellow card) 18', (goal) 21'; Karzev (yellow card) 39'; Shechter (yellow card) 45'; Saborit (yellow card) 45'; Piven (yellow card) 84'; Pešić 90+5' (pen.)	Report	18' (o.g.) Piven; (yellow card) 45' Chery; (yellow card) 45' Rodríguez	Stadium: Bloomfield Stadium; Attendance: 0 Referee: Orel Grinfeld

1 February 2021 18	Hapoel Be'er Sheva	0–1	Maccabi Tel Aviv	Be'er Sheva
20:45 IST (UTC+3)	Agudelo (yellow card) 24'; Acolatse (yellow card) 90+5'	Report	(yellow card) 29' Peretz; 39' Ben Haim	Stadium: Turner Stadium; Attendance: 0 Referee: Gal Leibovich

6 February 2021 19	Maccabi Tel Aviv	1–0	Bnei Sakhin	Tel Aviv
20:15 IST (UTC+3)	Hozez (yellow card) 29'; Glazer (yellow card) 45+1'; Ben Haim (yellow card) 80'; Peretz 90+5'	Report	(yellow card) 49' Shlaata	Stadium: Bloomfield Stadium; Attendance: 0 Referee: Daniel Bar Natan

10 February 2021 20	Maccabi Tel Aviv	3–1	Hapoel Hadera	Tel Aviv
20:15 IST (UTC+3)	Rikan 21'; Pešić 23', 69'; Saborit (yellow card) 40'	Report	5' Cissé; (yellow card) 10' Odah	Stadium: Bloomfield Stadium; Attendance: 0 Referee: Shalom Ben Avraham

13 February 2021 21	Hapoel Kfar Saba	0–1	Maccabi Tel Aviv	Petah Tikva
19:50 IST (UTC+3)	Atanda (yellow card) 54'; Soukouna (yellow card) 60'	Report	(yellow card) 30' Saborit; 41' Pešić	Stadium: HaMoshava Stadium; Attendance: 0 Referee: David Fuchsman

1 March 2021 22	Maccabi Tel Aviv	3–1	Ashdod	Tel Aviv
20:15 IST (UTC+3)	Eyal Golasa 15'; Matan Hozez 74'; Avi Rikan 90+1'	Report	81' Roei Gordana	Stadium: Bloomfield Stadium; Attendance: 0

4 March 2021 23	Hapoel Haifa	0–2	Maccabi Tel Aviv	Haifa
20:45 IST (UTC+3)		Report	49' Nick Blackman; 82' Dor Peretz	Stadium: Sammy Ofer Stadium; Attendance: 0

8 March 2021 24	Maccabi Tel Aviv	4–1	Beitar Jerusalem	Tel Aviv
20:45 IST (UTC+3)	Itay Shechter 28'; Yarden Shua 48' (o.g.); Enric Saborit 53' (pen.); Avi Rikan 76'	Report	70' Michael Ohana	Stadium: Bloomfield Stadium; Attendance: 0

13 March 2021 25	Hapoel Ironi Kiryat Shmona	0–2	Maccabi Tel Aviv	Kiryat Shmona
19:50 IST (UTC+3)	Yoav Hofmayster (yellow card) 19' (yellow-red card) 34'	Report	(yellow card) 25' Eyal Golasa; 31' Dor Peretz; (yellow card) 44' Sheran Yeini; (yellow card) 68' Ofir Davidzada; 82' (pen.) Matan Hozez	Stadium: Municipal Stadium; Attendance: 750

20 March 2021 26	Maccabi Tel Aviv	1–1	Hapoel Tel Aviv	Tel Aviv
	52' Dor Peretz; (yellow card) 56' Dor Peretz	Report	(yellow card) 8' Eyad Abu Abaid; 15' Omri Altman; (yellow card) 22' Ben Bitton; (yellow card) 62' Dan Einbinder; (yellow card) 62' Shay Elias	Stadium: Bloomfield Stadium; Attendance: 5,000

3 April 2021 27	Maccabi Tel Aviv	2–1	Hapoel Be'er Sheva	Tel Aviv
	42' Nick Blackman; 56' Nick Blackman	Report	71' Sagiv Yehezkel	Stadium: Bloomfield Stadium; Attendance: 5,000

6 April 2021 28	Maccabi Haifa	1–1	Maccabi Tel Aviv	Haifa
20:00	Planić 18'; Lavi (yellow card) 19'; Atzili; Chery (yellow card) 90+4'	Report	Geraldes (yellow card) 13'; Guerrero 50', (yellow card) 50'; Blackman (yellow card) 74' (yellow-red card) 76'; Kandil (yellow card) 87'	Stadium: Sammy Ofer Stadium; Attendance: 5,000; Referee: Roi Reinshreiber

11 April 2021 29	Maccabi Tel Aviv	3–1	Maccabi Petah Tikva	Tel Aviv
20:15	Pešić 31'; Guerrero 84', 90+6'	Report	Abada 66'	Stadium: Bloomfield Stadium; Attendance: 7,916; Referee: Orel Grinfeld

18 April 2021 30	Maccabi Tel Aviv	1–1	F.C. Ashdod	Tel Aviv
20:30	Saborit 71'	Report	Berihon 48'	Stadium: Bloomfield Stadium; Attendance: 8,822; Referee: Liran Liani

25 April 2021 31	Ironi Kiryat Shmona	2–0	Maccabi Tel Aviv	Kiryat Shmona
20:15	Kahat 45+2'; Shaker 90+3'	Report		Stadium: Municipal Stadium; Attendance: 1,956

3 May 2021 32	Hapoel Be'er Sheva	1–1	Maccabi Tel Aviv	Be'er Sheva
20:30	Kabha 61'	Report	Cohen 28' (pen.)	Stadium: Turner Stadium; Attendance: 5,000; Referee: Orel Grinfeld

9 May 2021 33	Maccabi Tel Aviv	2–2	Maccabi Haifa	Tel Aviv
20:30	Lavi 6' (o.g.); Pešić 17'; Glazer (yellow card) 45+12'; Yeini (yellow card) 67'	Report	Donyoh 36'; Chery 39'; Abu Fani (yellow card) 57'	Stadium: Bloomfield Stadium; Attendance: 22,913; Referee: Eitan Shmuelevic

23 May 2021 34	Maccabi Petah Tikva	0–3	Maccabi Tel Aviv	Petah Tikva
21:00		Report	Guerrero 62'; Shechter 68'; Peretz 78'	Stadium: HaMoshava Stadium; Attendance: 3,800

26 May 2021 35	F.C. Ashdod	1–2	Maccabi Tel Aviv	Ashdod
20:00	Mugees 90'	Report	Guerrero 77'; Almog 88'	Stadium: Yud Alef Stadium; Attendance: 1,603

30 May 2021 36	Maccabi Tel Aviv	2–2	Ironi Kiryat Shmona	Tel Aviv
20:30	Biton 18'; Biton 39'	Report	Lúcio 53'; Ansah 92+2'	Stadium: Bloomfield Stadium; Attendance: 20,412

=== State Cup ===
21 February 2021 Eighth Round	Hapoel Be'er Sheva (1)	0–1	Maccabi Tel Aviv (1)	Be'er Sheva
20:45		Report	65' Dor Peretz	Stadium: Turner Stadium; Attendance: 0

16 March 2021 Round of 16	Hapoel Haifa (1)	2–3	Maccabi Tel Aviv (1)	Haifa
20:45	Hanan Maman 5'; Alon Turgeman 74'	Report	8' (pen.) Tal Ben Haim; 12' (o.g.) Nisso Kapiloto; 62' (pen.) Nick Blackman	Stadium: Sammy Ofer Stadium; Attendance: 1,500; Referee: Shalom Ben Avraham, Avi Goldstein, Yossi Babayof, Sagi Berman

21 April 2021 Quarter-Finals	F.C. Ashdod (1)	0–1	Maccabi Tel Aviv (1)	Ashdod
20:30		Report	54' Dor Peretz	Stadium: Yud-Alef Stadium; Attendance: 1,793

20 May 2021 Semi-Finals	Maccabi Haifa (1)	0–2	Maccabi Tel Aviv (1)	Haifa
21:00	Ofri Arad (yellow card) 22'; Mohammad Abu Fani (yellow card) 37'; Omer Atzili (yellow card) 44'; Sun Menahem (yellow card) 70'	Report	51', 60' Itay Shechter; (yellow card) 57' Eitan Tibi	Stadium: Sammy Ofer Stadium; Attendance: 0 (Note: due to the 2021 Israel–Palestine crisis played Behind closed doors); Referee: Liran Liani; Assistant referees: Dudu Biton, Roei Hassan; Fourth official: Gal Laibuvitz
Note:

2 June 2021 Final	Maccabi Tel Aviv (1)	2–1 (a.e.t.)	Hapoel Tel Aviv (1)	Tel Aviv
20:30	Yonatan Cohen 73'; Luis Hernández 96'	Report	31' Omri Altman	Stadium: Bloomfield Stadium; Attendance: 29,000

=== Toto Cup ===
22 August 2020 Final	Bnei Sakhnin	0–2	Maccabi Tel Aviv	Sakhnin
20:30		Report	67' Baltaxa; 90+2' Biton	Stadium: Doha Stadium; Attendance: 0 Referee: Idan Leiba

=== Israeli Super Cup ===
8 August 2020 First Leg	Hapoel Be'er Sheva	0–2	Maccabi Tel Aviv	Jerusalem
20:15 IST (UTC+3)	Sabag (yellow card) 13'; Kabha (yellow card) 16'; Shviro (yellow card) 50' (yellow-red card) 56'	Report	7', 32' Blackman; (yellow card) 48' Davidzada	Stadium: Teddy Stadium; Attendance: 0 Referee: Daniel Bar Natan

13 August 2020 Second Leg	Maccabi Tel Aviv	2–0 (4–0 agg.)	Hapoel Be'er Sheva	Tel Aviv
20:30 IST (UTC+3)	Cohen 13'; Almog 44'	Report	62' Yosefi; (yellow card) 81' Gamoun	Stadium: Bloomfield Stadium; Attendance: 0 Referee: Gal Leibovich

=== UEFA Champions League ===
19 August 2020 First qualifying round	Maccabi Tel Aviv (Israel)	2–0	(Latvia) Riga	Tel Aviv, Israel
19:00 (20:00 IDT)	Blackman 58' (pen.), 88' (pen.)	Report		Stadium: Bloomfield Stadium; Attendance: 0 Referee: Igor Pajač (Croatia)

26 August 2020 Second qualifying round	Sūduva (Lithuania)	0–3	(Israel) Maccabi Tel Aviv	Marijampolė, Lithuania
18:00 (19:00 EEST)		Report	30' Rikan; 73' Blackman; 90+2' Davidzada	Stadium: Sūduva Stadium; Attendance: 0 Referee: Rade Obrenovič (Slovenia)

16 September 2020 Third qualifying round	Maccabi Tel Aviv (Israel)	1–0	(Belarus) Dynamo Brest	Tel Aviv, Israel
19:00 (20:00 EEST)	Biton 50' (pen.)	Report		Stadium: Bloomfield Stadium; Attendance: 0 Referee: Davide Massa (Italy)

22 September 2020 Play-off game 1	Maccabi Tel Aviv (Israel)	1–2	(Austria) Red Bull Salzburg	Tel Aviv, Israel
21:00 (22:00 IDT)	Biton 9'	Report	49' (pen.) Szoboszlai; 57' Okugawa	Stadium: Bloomfield Stadium; Attendance: 0 Referee: Michael Oliver (England)

30 September 2020 Play-off game 2	Red Bull Salzburg (Austria)	3–1	(Israel) Maccabi Tel Aviv	Wals-Siezenheim, Austria
21:00	Daka 16', 68'; Szoboszlai 45+4' (pen.)	Report	30' Karzev	Stadium: Stadion Wals-Siezenheim; Attendance: 0 Referee: Felix Brych (Germany)

=== Europa League ===
==== Group stage ====
The group stage draw was held on 2 October 2020.

Pos	Team	Pld	W	D	L	GF	GA	GD	Pts	Qualification	VIL	MTA	SIV	QRB
1	(Spain) Villarreal	6	5	1	0	17	5	+12	16	Advance to knockout phase	—	4–0	5–3	3–0 (Note: The Villarreal v Qarabağ match was awarded as a 3–0 win to Villarreal after being cancelled as several players of the Qarabağ squad tested positive for the SARS-CoV-2.)
2	(Israel) Maccabi Tel Aviv	6	3	2	1	6	7	−1	11	Advance to knockout phase	1–1	—	1–0	1–0
3	(Turkey) Sivasspor	6	2	0	4	9	11	−2	6		0–1	1–2	—	2–0
4	(Azerbaijan) Qarabağ	6	0	1	5	4	13	−9	1		1–3	1–1	2–3	—

Source: UEFA
Legend: Blue = home team win; Yellow = draw; Red = away team win.
Rules for classification: Group stage tiebreakers
Notes:

22 October 2020 1	Maccabi Tel Aviv (Israel)	1–0	(Azerbaijan) Qarabağ	Tel Aviv, Israel
21:00 CEST (UTC+2)	Cohen 10', (yellow card) 45+2'; Saborit (yellow card) 28'; Guerrero (yellow card) 73'; Rikan (yellow card) 89'	Report	(yellow card) 27' Ozobić; (yellow card) 30' Guerrier; (yellow card) 64' Medina; (yellow card) 64' Andrade	Stadium: Bloomfield Stadium; Attendance: 0 Referee: John Beaton (Scotland)

29 October 2020 2	Sivasspor (Turkey)	1–2	(Israel) Maccabi Tel Aviv	Sivas, Turkey
18:55 CET (UTC+1)	Kayode 55'	Report	69' (pen.) Biton; 74' Peretz	Stadium: New Sivas 4 Eylül Stadium; Referee: Irfan Peljto (Bosnia and Herzegovina)

5 November 2020 3	Villarreal (Spain)	4–0	(Israel) Maccabi Tel Aviv	Villarreal, Spain
22:10 CET (UTC+1)	Bacca 4', 52'; Baena 71'; Funes Mori (yellow card) 77'; Niño 81'	Report	(yellow card) 56' Glazer; (yellow card) 59' Saborit	Stadium: Estadio de la Cerámica; Referee: Nikola Dabanović (Montenegro)

26 November 2020 4	Maccabi Tel Aviv (Israel)	1–1	(Spain) Villarreal	Tel Aviv, Israel
18:55 CET (UTC+1)	Kandil (yellow card) 43'; Pešić 47'; Daniel (yellow card) 79'; Saborit (red card) 89'	Report	(yellow card) 26' Coquelin; 45' Baena; (yellow card) 73' Funes Mori; (yellow card) 89' Peña	Stadium: Bloomfield Stadium; Attendance: 0 Referee: Tiago Martins (Portugal)

3 December 2020 5	Qarabağ (Azerbaijan)	1–1	(Israel) Maccabi Tel Aviv	Istanbul, Turkey
18:55 CET (UTC+1)	Guerrier (yellow card) 21'; Romero 37'; Matić (yellow card) 40'	Report	22' (pen.) Cohen; (yellow card) 85' Hernández	Stadium: Başakşehir Fatih Terim Stadium; Referee: Rob Hennessy (Ireland)

10 December 2020 6	Maccabi Tel Aviv (Israel)	1–0	(Turkey) Sivasspor	Tel Aviv, Israel
21:00 CET (UTC+1)	Tibi (yellow card) 53'; Saborit 67'; Rikan (yellow card) 77'; Daniel (yellow card) 90+4'	Report	(yellow card) 77' Fajr; (yellow card) 78' Appindangoyé; (yellow card) 79' Koné; (yellow card) 86' Gradel; (yellow card) 90+1' Yatabaré	Stadium: Bloomfield Stadium; Attendance: 0 Referee: Andris Treimanis (Latvia)

==== Knockout phase ====
The round of 32 draw was held on 14 December 2020.

18 February 2021 Round of 32 – 1st leg	Maccabi Tel Aviv (Israel)	0–2	(Ukraine) Shakhtar Donetsk	Tel Aviv, Israel
22:00 EET (UTC+2)	Glazer (yellow card) 64'; Peretz (yellow card) 83'	Report	31' Patrick; (yellow card) 41' Marlos; (yellow card) 75' Taison; 90+3' Tetê	Stadium: Bloomfield Stadium; Attendance: 0 Referee: François Letexier (France)

25 February 2021 Round of 32 – 2nd leg	Shakhtar Donetsk (Ukraine)	1–0 (3–0 agg.)	(Israel) Maccabi Tel Aviv	Kyiv, Ukraine
19:55 EET (UTC+2)	Vitão (yellow card) 33'; Moraes 67' (pen.)	Report		Stadium: NSC Olimpiyskiy; Referee: José María Sánchez Martínez (Spain)
