= 2021–22 Maccabi Tel Aviv F.C. season =

Maccabi Tel Aviv
2021–22 season
- Chairman: Mitchell Goldhar
- Stadium: Bloomfield Stadium, Tel Aviv
- Premier League: 3rd
- State Cup: Semi-finals
- Toto Cup: 6th
- Super Cup: Runners-up
- Europa Conference League: Knockout round play-offs
- Top goalscorer: League: Stipe Perica (15); All: Stipe Perica (17)
Home colours	Away colours	Third colours
- All statistics correct as of 22 May 2022.

The 2021–22 season is Maccabi Tel Aviv's 115th season since its establishment in 1906 and 74th since the establishment of the State of Israel. During the 2021–22 campaign, the club will compete in the Israeli Premier League, State Cup, Toto Cup, Israeli Super Cup and Europa Conference League.

== Season squad ==
As of 31 August 2021

No.	Pos.	Nation	Player
1	GK	ISR	Daniel Peretz
3	DF	ISR	Matan Baltaxa
4	DF	ESP	Enric Saborit
5	DF	ISR	Idan Nachmias
6	MF	ISR	Dan Glazer
7	FW	ISR	Matan Hozez
9	FW	CRO	Stipe Perica
10	MF	ISR	Dan Biton
11	FW	ISR	Tal Ben Haim
16	MF	ISR	Gabi Kanichowsky
17	MF	CUW	Brandley Kuwas
18	MF	ISR	Eden Shamir (on loan from Standard Liège)
19	GK	BRA	Daniel Tenenbaum
20	FW	ISR	Osama Khalaila

No.	Pos.	Nation	Player
21	DF	ISR	Sheran Yeini (captain)
22	MF	ISR	Avi Rikan
23	MF	ISR	Eyal Golasa
26	FW	ISR	Ronen Hanzis
27	DF	ISR	Ofir Davidzada
28	DF	POR	André Geraldes
29	FW	ISR	Eylon Almog
30	DF	ISR	Maor Kandil
31	DF	ISR	Shahar Piven
33	GK	ISR	Or Itzhak
36	MF	ISR	Ido Shahar
39	FW	PAN	Eduardo Guerrero
44	DF	ESP	Luis Hernández

== Israeli Premier League ==
=== Regular season ===
Pos	Team	Pld	W	D	L	GF	GA	GD	Pts	Qualification or relegation
1	Maccabi Haifa	26	18	5	3	62	19	+43	59	Qualification for the Championship round
2	Hapoel Be'er Sheva	26	16	7	3	39	17	+22	55	Qualification for the Championship round
3	Maccabi Tel Aviv	26	16	5	5	48	31	+17	53	Qualification for the Championship round
4	Bnei Sakhnin	26	12	6	8	28	29	−1	42	Qualification for the Championship round
5	Maccabi Netanya	26	10	10	6	34	27	+7	40	Qualification for the Championship round

Source: Soccerway
Rules for classification: 1) Points; 2) Goal difference; 3) Matches won; 4) Goals scored; 5) Head-to-head points; 6) Head-to-head goal difference; 7) Head-to-head goals scored; 8) Play-off.

==== Results summary ====
Overall								Home						Away					
Pld	W	D	L	GF	GA	GD	Pts	W	D	L	GF	GA	GD	W	D	L	GF	GA	GD
26	16	5	5	48	31	+17	53	7	5	1	19	15	+4	9	0	4	29	16	+13

Last updated: completed.

==== Results by matchday ====
Away
Home
Win
Draw
Loss
Qualification for the Championship round & 1st place
Qualification for the Championship round & 2nd place
Qualification for the Championship round & 3rd place
Qualification for the Championship round
Transfer to the Relegation round

Matchday	1	2	3	4	5	6	7	8	9	10	11	12	13	14	15	16	17	18	19	20	21	22	23	24	25	26
Ground	A	H	H	A	H	A	H	A	H	A	H	A	H	H	A	A	H	A	H	A	H	A	H	A	H	A
Result	L	D	W	L	W	L	L	W	D	W	D	W	W	D	W	L	W	W	D	W	W	W	W	W	W	W
Position	13	10	8	10	7	9	12	8	9	6	6	4	4	4	3	4	4	3	4	3	3	3	3	3	3	3

Updated to match(es) played on 7 March 2022. Source:

==== Matches ====
All times in IST (UTC+3)

29 August 2021 1	Bnei Sakhnin	3–1	Maccabi Tel Aviv	Sakhnin
20:00	Jaber 28'; Stain 74'; Lax 90+8'	Report	7' (pen.) Saborit	Stadium: Doha; Referee: Igal Frid

11 September 2021 2	Maccabi Tel Aviv	1–1	Maccabi Petah Tikva	Tel Aviv
19:30	Perica 31'	Report	57' Banda	Stadium: Bloomfield

18 September 2021 3	Maccabi Tel Aviv	2–1	Maccabi Haifa	Tel Aviv
20:30	Nachmias 3'; Perica 60'	Report	32' Menahem	Stadium: Bloomfield

25 September 2021 4	Hapoel Be'er Sheva	2–0	Maccabi Tel Aviv	Be'er Sheva
20:30		Report		Stadium: Turner

2 October 2021 5	Maccabi Tel Aviv	1–0	Hapoel Jerusalem	Tel Aviv
20:15		Report		Stadium: Bloomfield

16 October 2021 6	Maccabi Netanya	4–2	Maccabi Tel Aviv	Netanya
20:30		Report		Stadium: Netanya Stadium

25 October 2021 7	Maccabi Tel Aviv	0–2	F.C. Ashdod	Tel Aviv
20:15		Report		Stadium: Bloomfield

30 October 2021 8	Ironi Kiryat Shmona	1–3	Maccabi Tel Aviv	Kiryat Shmona
17:30		Report		Stadium: Municipal Stadium

7 November 2021 9	Maccabi Tel Aviv	1–1	Hapoel Tel Aviv	Tel Aviv
20:45		Report		Stadium: Bloomfield

28 November 2021 10	Hapoel Haifa	1–3	Maccabi Tel Aviv	Haifa
20:15		Report		Stadium: Sammy Ofer

1 December 2021 11	Maccabi Tel Aviv	1–1	Hapoel Nof HaGalil	Tel Aviv
19:30		Report		Stadium: Bloomfield

4 December 2021 12	Beitar Jerusalem	1–2	Maccabi Tel Aviv	Jerusalem
20:45		Report		Stadium: Teddy

13 December 2021 13	Maccabi Tel Aviv	3–0	Hapoel Hadera	Tel Aviv
20:15	Perica 34'; Ben Haim 60', 71'	Report		Stadium: Bloomfield

22 December 2021 14	Maccabi Tel Aviv	1–1	Bnei Sakhnin	Tel Aviv
20:00		Report		Stadium: Bloomfield

27 December 2021 15	Maccabi Petah Tikva	1–2	Maccabi Tel Aviv	Petah Tikva
20:30		Report		Stadium: HaMoshava

3 January 2022 16	Maccabi Haifa	3–2	Maccabi Tel Aviv	Haifa
20:30	Chery 77'; Donyoh 79'; David 87'	Report	1' (o.g.) Haziza; 14' Shamir	Stadium: Sammy Ofer; Attendance: 30,000; Referee: Liran Liany

8 January 2022 17	Maccabi Tel Aviv	1–0	Hapoel Be'er Sheva	Tel Aviv
20:00		Report		Stadium: Bloomfield

15 January 2022 18	Hapoel Jerusalem	1–3	Maccabi Tel Aviv	Jerusalem
19:50		Report		Stadium: Teddy

22 January 2022 19	Maccabi Tel Aviv	2–2	Maccabi Netanya	Tel Aviv
17:20		Report		Stadium: Bloomfield

29 January 2022 20	F.C. Ashdod	1–3	Maccabi Tel Aviv	Ashdod
17:30		Report		Stadium: Yud-Alef

5 February 2022 21	Maccabi Tel Aviv	1–0	Ironi Kiryat Shmona	Tel Aviv
17:30		Report		Stadium: Bloomfield

12 February 2022 22	Hapoel Tel Aviv	2–3	Maccabi Tel Aviv	Tel Aviv
20:00		Report		Stadium: Bloomfield

20 February 2022 23	Maccabi Tel Aviv	2–0	Hapoel Haifa	Tel Aviv
20:15		Report		Stadium: Bloomfield

28 February 2022 24	Hapoel Nof HaGalil	1–3	Maccabi Tel Aviv	Nof HaGalil
20:15		Report		Stadium: Green

7 March 2022 25	Maccabi Tel Aviv	3–1	Beitar Jerusalem	Tel Aviv
20:30		Report		Stadium: Bloomfield

12 March 2022 26	Hapoel Hadera	0–2	Maccabi Tel Aviv	Netanya
19:00		Report		Stadium: Netanya Stadium

=== Championship round ===
Pos	Team	Pld	W	D	L	GF	GA	GD	Pts	Qualification	MHA	HBS	MTA	MNE	HTA	BnS
1	Maccabi Haifa (C)	36	24	6	6	79	27	+52	78	Qualification for the Champions League second qualifying round	—	2–0	1–3	4–0	3–0	1–0
2	Hapoel Be'er Sheva	36	20	10	6	53	30	+23	70	Qualification for the Europa Conference League second qualifying round	1–0	—	1–0	4–1	2–2	3–1
3	Maccabi Tel Aviv	36	20	9	7	63	38	+25	69	Qualification for the Europa Conference League second qualifying round	1–1	1–1	—	2–1	5–0	0–0
4	Maccabi Netanya	36	13	13	10	47	41	+6	52	Qualification for the Europa Conference League second qualifying round	3–0	3–0	1–1	—	0–0	3–0
5	Hapoel Tel Aviv	36	13	11	12	44	47	−3	50		0–2	2–1	0–2	2–0	—	2–1
6	Bnei Sakhnin	36	13	10	13	33	43	−10	49		0–3	1–1	1–0	1–1	0–0	—

Source: Soccerway
Legend: Blue = home team win; Yellow = draw; Red = away team win.
Rules for classification: 1) Points; 2) Goal difference; 3) Matches won; 4) Goals scored; 5) Head-to-head points; 6) Head-to-head goal difference; 7) Head-to-head goals scored; 8) Play-off.
(C) Champions

==== Results summary ====
Overall								Home						Away					
Pld	W	D	L	GF	GA	GD	Pts	W	D	L	GF	GA	GD	W	D	L	GF	GA	GD
10	4	4	2	15	7	+8	16	2	3	0	9	3	+6	2	1	2	6	4	+2

Last updated: 22 May 2022.

==== Results by matchday ====
Away
Home
Win
Draw
Loss
Qualification for the Champions League first qualifying round
Qualification for the Europa Conference League second qualifying round

Matchday	27	28	29	30	31	32	33	34	35	36
Ground	H	A	H	A	H	A	H	A	H	A
Result	D	D	D	L	W	L	W	W	D	W
Position	3	3	3	3	3	3	3	3	3	3

==== Matches ====
All times in IST (UTC+3)

19 March 2022 27	Maccabi Tel Aviv	0–0	Bnei Sakhnin	Tel Aviv
15:00		Report		Stadium: Bloomfield

2 April 2022 28	Maccabi Netanya	1–1	Maccabi Tel Aviv	Netanya
20:00		Report		Stadium: Netanya Stadium

11 April 2022 29	Maccabi Tel Aviv	1–1	Maccabi Haifa	Tel Aviv
20:30	Gloukh 27'	Report	90+3' Chery	Stadium: Bloomfield

17 April 2022 30	Hapoel Be'er Sheva	1–0	Maccabi Tel Aviv	Be'er Sheva
20:30		Report		Stadium: Turner

25 April 2022 31	Maccabi Tel Aviv	5–0	Hapoel Tel Aviv	Tel Aviv
20:30		Report		Stadium: Bloomfield

30 April 2022 32	Bnei Sakhnin	1–0	Maccabi Tel Aviv	Sakhnin
20:15		Report		Stadium: Doha

7 May 2022 33	Maccabi Tel Aviv	2–1	Maccabi Netanya	Haifa
19:30		Report		Stadium: Sammy Ofer

10 May 2022 34	Maccabi Haifa	1–3	Maccabi Tel Aviv	Haifa
20:30	Chery 63'	Report	23' Perica; 86' (pen.) Jovanović; 90+2' Oscar Gloch	Stadium: Sammy Ofer

16 May 2022 35	Maccabi Tel Aviv	1–1	Hapoel Be'er Sheva	Tel Aviv
20:30		Report		Stadium: Bloomfield

21 May 2022 36	Hapoel Tel Aviv	0–2	Maccabi Tel Aviv	Tel Aviv
20:30		Report		Stadium: Bloomfield

== State Cup ==
19 December 2021 8th round	Maccabi Tel Aviv	4–0	Hapoel Marmorek (3)	Tel Aviv
20:00		Report		Stadium: Bloomfield

11 January 2022 Round of 16	Ironi Kiryat Shmona (1)	2–2 (3–5 p)	Maccabi Tel Aviv	Kiryat Shmona
20:00		Report		Stadium: Municipal Stadium

2 February 2022 Quarter-finals — First leg	Maccabi Tel Aviv	2–0	Maccabi Kabilio Jaffa (3)	Tel Aviv
19:30		Report		Stadium: Bloomfield

3 March 2022 Quarter-finals — Second leg	Maccabi Kabilio Jaffa (3)	0–4 (0–6 agg.)	Maccabi Tel Aviv	Tel Aviv
19:30		Report		Stadium: Bloomfield

20 April 2022 Semi-finals	Maccabi Tel Aviv	1–3	Hapoel Be'er Sheva (1)	Tel Aviv
20:30	Jovanović 7'; Baltaxa (yellow card) 55'; Glazer (yellow card) 82'	Report	26', (yellow card) 53' Bareiro; 40' Ansah; (yellow card) 45' Abd Elhamed; 65' Hatuel; (yellow card) 86' Safouri	Stadium: Bloomfield Stadium; Attendance: 26,954; Referee: Roi Reinshreiber

== Toto Cup ==
22 August 2021 5–6 place	Maccabi Tel Aviv	1–1 (5–6 p)	Hapoel Jerusalem	Tel Aviv
20:00	Hanzis 49'	Report	73' (pen.) Hadida	Stadium: Bloomfield Stadium

== Israeli Super Cup ==
25 July 2021
20:30

Maccabi Haifa	2–0	Maccabi Tel Aviv
Atzili (yellow card) 1'; Sahar 50'; Meir (yellow card) 68'; Cohen (yellow card) 70'; Abu Fani 72', (yellow card) 90+2'; Maor Levi (yellow card) 90+1'	Report	(yellow card) 14' Glazer; (yellow card) 37' Nachmias

Sammy Ofer Stadium, Haifa
Attendance: 19,798
Referee: Liran Liany

== UEFA Europa Conference League ==
=== Qualifying phase ===
22 July 2021 2nd qualifying round – 1st leg	Sutjeska Nikšić (Montenegro)	0–0	(Israel) Maccabi Tel Aviv	Podgorica, Montenegro
20:30 (21:30 IDT)		Report		Stadium: DG Arena; Referee: Julian Weinberger (AUT); Assistant referees: Andreas Heidenreich (AUT); Andreas Staudinger (AUT); Fourth official: Josef Spurny (AUT)

29 July 2021 2nd qualifying round – 2nd leg	Maccabi Tel Aviv (Israel)	3–1	(Montenegro) Sutjeska Nikšić	Tel Aviv, Israel
20:30 (IDT)		Report		Stadium: Bloomfield Stadium; Referee: Peter Kjaesgaard (Denmark); Assistant referees: Victor Skytte (DEN); Jesper Dahl (DEN); Fourth official: Jakob Alexander Sundberg (DEN)

5 August 2021 3rd qualifying round – 1st leg	Spartak Trnava (Slovakia)	0–0	(Israel) Maccabi Tel Aviv	Trnava, Slovakia
20:15 (21:15 IDT)		Report		Stadium: Anton Malatinský Stadium; Attendance: 700; Referee: Kirill Levnikov (Russia); Assistant referees: Egor Bolkhovitin (RUS); Andrei Vereteshkin (RUS); Fourth official: Vladislav Bezborodov (RUS)

12 August 2021 3rd qualifying round – 2nd leg	Maccabi Tel Aviv (Israel)	1–0	(Slovakia) Spartak Trnava	Tel Aviv, Israel
20:30 (IDT)	Yeini 13'	Report		Stadium: Bloomfield Stadium; Attendance: 9,972; Referee: Trustin Farrugia Cann (MLT); Assistant referees: Luke Portelli (MLT); Roberto Vella (MLT); Fourth official: Ishmael Barbara (MLT)

19 August 2021 Play-off round – 1st leg	Shakhter Karagandy (Kazakhstan)	1–2	(Israel) Maccabi Tel Aviv	Nur-Sultan, Kazakhstan
15:00 (16:00 IDT)	Umayev 73'	Report	75' Rikan; 77' Shamir	Stadium: Astana Arena; Referee: Srđan Jovanović (SRB); Assistant referees: Uroš Stojković (SRB); Milan Mihajlović (SRB); Fourth official: Novak Simović (SRB)

26 August 2021 Play-off round – 2nd leg	Maccabi Tel Aviv (Israel)	2–0	(Kazakhstan) Shakhter Karagandy	Tel Aviv, Israel
20:30 (IDT)	Nachmias 18'; Glazer 40'	Report		Stadium: Bloomfield Stadium; Referee: Nikola Dabanović (MNE); Assistant referees: Milovan Djukić (MNE); Vladan Todorović (MNE); Fourth official: Miloš Bošković (MNE)

=== Group stage ===
Pos	Team	Pld	W	D	L	GF	GA	GD	Pts	Qualification	LASK	MTA	HJK	ALA
1	(Austria) LASK	6	5	1	0	12	1	+11	16	Advance to round of 16	—	1–1	3–0	2–0
2	(Israel) Maccabi Tel Aviv	6	3	2	1	14	4	+10	11	Advance to knockout round play-offs	0–1	—	3–0	4–1
3	(Finland) HJK	6	2	0	4	5	15	−10	6		0–2	0–5	—	1–0
4	(Armenia) Alashkert	6	0	1	5	4	15	−11	1		0–3	1–1	2–4	—

Source: UEFA
Legend: Blue = home team win; Yellow = draw; Red = away team win.
Rules for classification: Group stage tiebreakers

14 September 2021	Maccabi Tel Aviv (Israel)	4–1	(Armenia) Alashkert	Tel Aviv, Israel
16:30 (17:30 IDT)	Perica 13'; Kanichowsky 32'; Biton 45+3' (pen.); Hozez 72'	Report	Embaló 17'	Stadium: Bloomfield Stadium; Attendance: 6,934; Referee: Espen Eskås (Norway)

30 September 2021	LASK (Austria)	1–1	(Israel) Maccabi Tel Aviv	Klagenfurt, Austria
18:45	Horvath 10'	Report	Shamir 88'	Stadium: Wörthersee Stadion; Attendance: 1,000; Referee: Mykola Balakin (Ukraine)

21 October 2021	HJK (Finland)	0–5	(Israel) Maccabi Tel Aviv	Helsinki, Finland
16:30 (17:30 EEST)		Report	Kanichowsky 28', 60'; Perica 49' (pen.); Saborit 87' (pen.); Shamir 90+4'	Stadium: Bolt Arena; Attendance: 4,883; Referee: Pavel Orel (Czech Republic)

4 November 2021	Maccabi Tel Aviv (Israel)	3–0	(Finland) HJK	Tel Aviv, Israel
18:45 (19:45 IST)	Kuwas 22'; Lingman 65' (o.g.); Hozez 90+3'	Report		Stadium: Bloomfield Stadium; Attendance: 8,029; Referee: Rade Obrenovič (Slovenia)

25 November 2021	Maccabi Tel Aviv (Israel)	0–1	(Austria) LASK	Tel Aviv, Israel
21:00 (22:00 IST)		Report	Horvath 89'	Stadium: Bloomfield Stadium; Referee: Jérôme Brisard (France)

9 December 2021	Alashkert (Armenia)	1–1	(Israel) Maccabi Tel Aviv	Yerevan, Armenia
18:45 (21:45 AMT)		Report		Stadium: Vazgen Sargsyan Republican Stadium

=== Knockout phase ===
==== Knockout round play-offs ====
17 February 2022 Knockout round play-offs — 1st leg	PSV Eindhoven (Netherlands)	1–0	(Israel) Maccabi Tel Aviv	Eindhoven, Netherlands
18:45	Gakpo 11'	Report		Stadium: Philips Stadion; Attendance: 14,280; Referee: Glenn Nyberg (Sweden)

24 February 2022 Knockout round play-offs — 2nd leg	Maccabi Tel Aviv (Israel)	1–1 (1–2 agg.)	(Netherlands) PSV Eindhoven	Tel Aviv, Israel
18:45 (19:45 IDT)	Saborit 90+1'	Report	85' Vertessen	Stadium: Bloomfield Stadium
