= 2021 Israel State Cup final =

- Event: 2020–21 Israel State Cup
Maccabi Tel Aviv	Hapoel Tel Aviv
2	1
- After extra time
- Date: 2 June 2021
- Venue: Bloomfield Stadium, Tel Aviv
- Referee: Erez Papir
- Attendance: 29,000

The 2021 Israel State Cup final decided the winner of the 2020–21 Israel State Cup, the 85th season of the Israel State Cup. It was played on 2 June 2021 at the Bloomfield Stadium in Tel Aviv, between city rivals Maccabi Tel Aviv and Hapoel Tel Aviv after it was initially planned to be held in the Sammy Ofer Stadium in Haifa.

== Background ==
Hapoel Tel Aviv had previously played 24 Israel cup Finals, winning 16 of them. Their most recent appearance in the final was in 2012, in which they beat Maccabi Haifa 2–1 to win the State Cup.

Maccabi Tel Aviv had previously played in 36 finals, winning 23 of them. Their most recent appearance in the final was in 2017, in which they lost 4–3 in a penalty shootout to Bnei Yehuda following a 0–0 score after extra time. Their most recent victory in the tournament was in 2015, in which they beat Hapoel Be'er Sheva 6–2 to win the cup.

== Road to the final ==
Maccabi Tel Aviv		Round	Hapoel Tel Aviv
Opponent	Result	2020–21 Israel State Cup	Result	Opponent
Hapoel Be'er Sheva (1)	1–0	Eighth round	4–0	Hapoel Ashkeon (3)
Hapoel Haifa (1)	3–2	Round of 16	3–1	Maccabi Netanya (1)
F.C. Ashdod (1)	1–0	Quarter-finals	1–0	Hapoel Kfar Shalem (2)
Maccabi Haifa (1)	2–0	Semi-finals	1–1 (7–6 p.)	Beitar Tel Aviv Bat Yam (2)

== Match ==
=== Details ===
2 June 2021
20:30

Maccabi Tel Aviv	2–1 (a.e.t.)	Hapoel Tel Aviv
Cohen 73'; Hernández 96'	Report	Altman 31'

Bloomfield Stadium, Tel Aviv
Attendance: 29,000
Referee: Erez Papir

Maccabi Tel Aviv	Hapoel Tel Aviv

GK	19	(Israel) Daniel
RB	28	(Portugal) Andre Geraldes
CB	3	(Israel) Matan Baltaxa
CB	44	(Spain) Luis Hernández
LB	4	(Spain) Enric Saborit
DM	6	(Israel) Dan Glazer
CM	21	(Israel) Sheran Yeini (c)		(substituted off) 70'
LM	42	(Israel) Dor Peretz
CF	39	(Panama) Eduardo Guerrero	(yellow card) 65'
RW	10	(Israel) Itay Shechter	(yellow card) 83'	(substituted off) 63'
LW	11	(Israel) Tal Ben Haim		(substituted off) 46'
Substitutes:
GK	1	(Israel) Daniel Peretz
DF	18	(Israel) Eitan Tibi
DF	27	(Israel) Ofir Davidzada
DF	31	(Israel) Shahar Piven
MF	17	(Israel) Dan Biton	(substituted on) 70'	(yellow card) 105'
MF	47	(Israel) Eden Karzev
FW	9	(Israel) Nick Blackman
FW	7	(Israel) Matan Hozez	(substituted on) 46'	(yellow card) 120+5'
FW	24	(Israel) Yonatan Cohen		(substituted on) 64'
Manager:
(Netherlands) Patrick van Leeuwen

GK	1	(Lithuania) Ernestas Šetkus
RB	2	(Israel) Ben Bitton
CB	6	(Israel) Edi Gotlieb	(yellow card) 90+1'
CB	5	(Israel) Eyad Abu Abaid	(yellow card) 115'
LB	14	(Israel) Denny Gruper
CM	11	(Israel) Dan Einbinder
CM	9	(Israel) Shay Elias	(yellow card) 75'	(substituted off) 90+3'
RW	8	(Israel) Osher Davida		(substituted off) 74'
AM	7	(Israel) Omri Altman (c)	(yellow card) 90+1'	(substituted off) 106'
LW	19	(Israel) Lidor Cohen
CF	18	(Israel) Shlomi Azulay		(substituted off) 67'
Substitutes:
GK	13	(Israel) Igal Becker
DF	16	(Israel) Doron Leidner		(substituted on) 106'
DF	23	(Israel) Raz Shlomo		(substituted on) 120+5'
DF	55	(South Africa) Siyanda Xulu
DF	99	(Israel) Ofek Bitton
MF	26	(Ghana) Emmanuel Boateng	(yellow card) 118'	(substituted on) 67' (substituted off) 120+5'
FW	29	(Israel) Shay Izan	(red card) 120'	(substituted on) 90+3'
FW	10	(Israel) Gil Itzhak		(substituted on) 106'
FW	17	(Israel) Raz Stein	(yellow card) 85'	(substituted on) 74'
Manager:
(Israel) Nir Klinger
