= Daniel Peretz =

Israeli football player (born 2000)

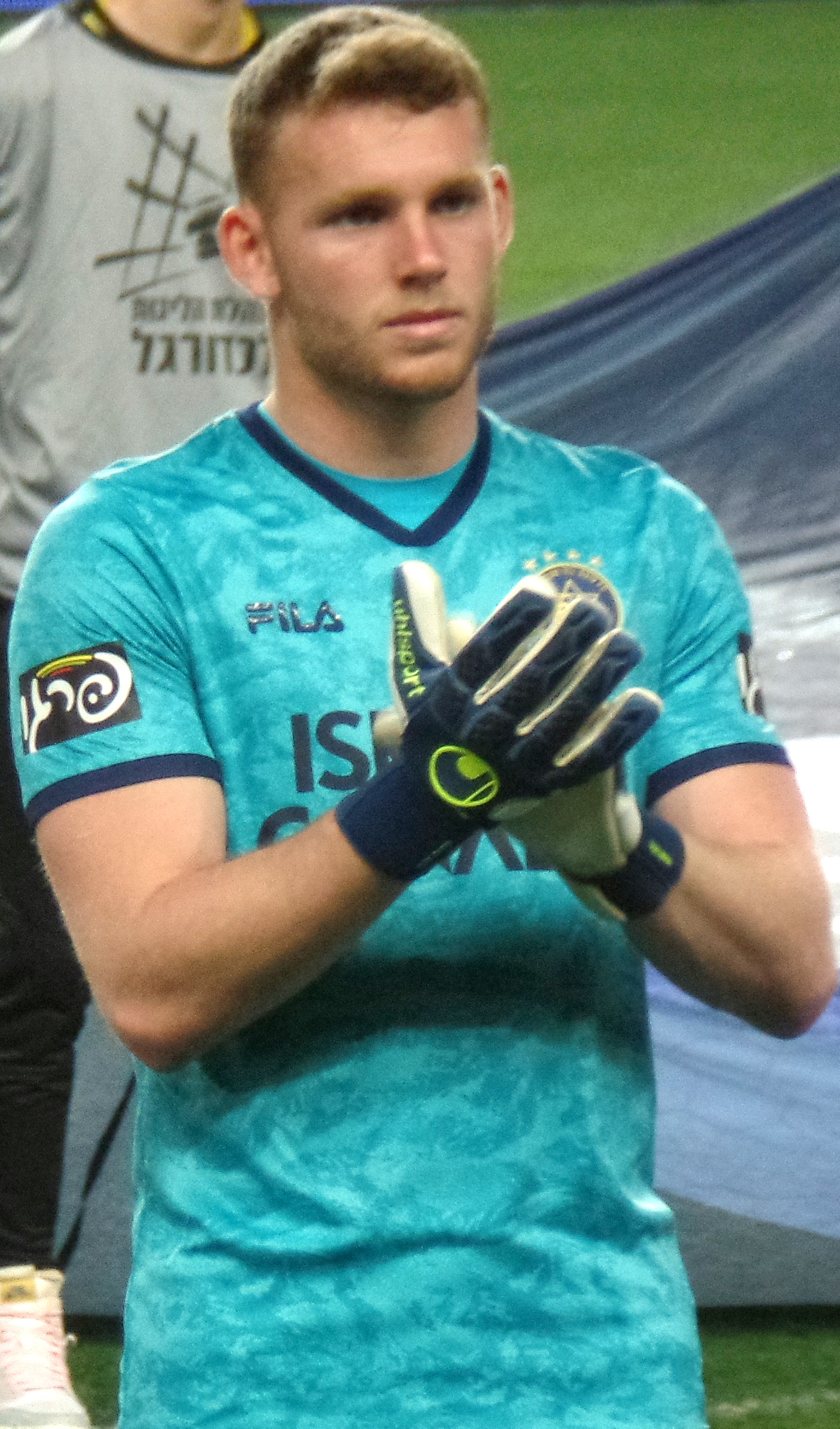
- Peretz with Maccabi Tel Aviv in 2022

Personal information
- Full name: Daniel Peretz
- Date of birth: 10 July 2000 (age 26)
- Place of birth: Tel Aviv, Israel
- Height: 1.96 m (6 ft 5 in)
- Position: Goalkeeper

Team information
- Current team: Southampton
- Number: 1

Youth career
- 2006–2019: Maccabi Tel Aviv

Senior career*
Years	Team	Apps	(Gls)
2019–2023	Maccabi Tel Aviv	71	(0)
2019–2020	→ Beitar Tel Aviv Bat Yam (loan)	32	(2)
2023–2026	Bayern Munich	4	(0)
2024	Bayern Munich II	1	(0)
2025–2026	→ Hamburger SV (loan)	0	(0)
2026	→ Southampton (loan)	20	(0)
2026–	Southampton	16	(0)

International career^{‡}
2016–2017	Israel U17	13	(0)
2017	Israel U18	2	(0)
2017–2019	Israel U19	10	(0)
2021–2023	Israel U21	11	(0)
2022–	Israel	16	(0)
- * Club domestic league appearances and goals as of 15:25, 21 November 2026 (UTC) ‡ National team caps and goals as of 21:42, 17 November 2026 (UTC)

Daniel Peretz (Hebrew: דניאל פרץ, /ˈdɑːˈnɪɛl ˈpɛrɛ/ t̻͡s̪; born 10 July 2000) is an Israeli professional footballer who plays as a goalkeeper for EFL Championship club Southampton and the Israel national team.

Peretz is a product of the Maccabi Tel Aviv academy and made his professional debut for the club in August 2020. He spent the 2019–20 season on loan at Beitar Tel Aviv Bat Yam. In August 2023, Peretz joined Bayern Munich. He had loan spells with Hamburger SV and Southampton before he joined the latter permanently in June 2026. Peretz has represented his country at youth and full international level.

== Early and personal life ==
Peretz was born and raised in Tel Aviv, Israel, to an Israeli family of both Sephardi Jewish and Mizrahi Jewish (Moroccan Jewish) descent, as well as of Ashkenazi Jewish (German-Jewish) descent. His maternal cousins are fellow Maccabi Tel Aviv youth academy graduates Dan Glazer and twin-brothers Tamir Glazer and Amit Glazer, who all have been Israel international footballers since youth. Peretz has two younger sisters.

He also holds EU citizenship through a German passport, on account of his Ashkenazi Jewish ancestors.

He has been in a relationship with Israeli singer-songwriter and actress Noa Kirel since July 2023. They were engaged in September 2024, and married in November 2025.

== Club career ==
Peretz joined Israeli club Maccabi Tel Aviv's youth academy, at the age of six.

=== Loan to Beitar Tel Aviv Bat Yam ===
He spent his senior debut season on loan at Israeli club Beitar Tel Aviv Bat Yam in the 2019–20 Liga Leumit season, where he made 32 appearances, and unusually for a goalkeeper, scored two goals during the season.

=== Maccabi Tel Aviv ===
On 22 August 2020, Peretz made his senior debut with Israeli defending champions Maccabi Tel Aviv during their 2020–21 Toto Cup Al (the League Cup of the Israeli Premier League) final 2–0 win against Bnei Sakhnin. On 12 September 2021, he signed a new contract with the club, until the end of the 2023–24 Israeli Premier League season.

Peretz was Maccabi Tel Aviv's first choice goalkeeper during his European campaign debut in the 2021–22 UEFA Europa Conference League, helping his team to qualify to the final tournament's group stage where they qualified in second place. In the knockout round play-offs against Dutch side PSV Eindhoven, a 1–0 away loss and a 1–1 home draw saw the team eliminated.

On 18 August 2022, Peretz was praised for his performance in the club's 2022–23 UEFA Conference League Play-offs first leg against French side Nice, keeping a clean sheet in a 1–0 home victory.

=== Bayern Munich ===
On 25 August 2023, Peretz joined Bundesliga champions Bayern Munich signing a five-year contract until 30 June 2028, for a reported initial transfer fee of over €5 million; receiving the number 18 jersey. He is the first Israeli to play for Bayern Munich.

On 26 September 2023, Peretz made his debut at the club by starting in a 4–0 away win over SC Preußen Münster in the 2023–24 DFB-Pokal. On 12 May 2024, he made his Bundesliga debut, coming off the bench to substitute Manuel Neuer, in a 2–0 win over VfL Wolfsburg.

On 25 October 2024, Peretz was called up with the reserve team Bayern Munich II making his debut, starting and featuring full time for the 3–0 home win Regionalliga Bayern match against TSV Schwaben Augsburg.

On 4 December 2024, Peretz played his first match of the 2024–25 season for Bayern Munich's first team against Bayer Leverkusen in the round of 16 of the DFB-Pokal. He was subbed on for Leroy Sané in the 20th minute after fellow goalkeeper Manuel Neuer received a red card. A week later, on 10 December, he made his UEFA Champions League debut in a 5–1 away victory over Shakhtar Donetsk.

==== Loans to Hamburger SV and Southampton ====
On 21 July 2025, Peretz joined fellow Bundesliga club Hamburger SV on loan for the 2025–26 season. On 8 January 2026, he was recalled from Hamburg and joined English club Southampton on loan for the remainder of the season. Peretz made his debut for the club on 10 January in a 3–2 away victory against Doncaster Rovers in the FA Cup. He featured in a 2–1 win over Arsenal on 4 April 2026, helping Southampton to qualify for the 2026 FA Cup semifinals.

=== Southampton ===
On 5 June 2026, Peretz joined Southampton permanently on a four-year contract which started from 15 June 2026.

== International career ==
=== Youth ===
Peretz has been a youth international for Israel since 2016, and was the first choice goalkeeper for Israel's U-21 team since his debut on 2 September 2021.

In the second leg of the play-offs for the 2023 UEFA European Under-21 Championship against Ireland, the match ended in a draw. In the resulting penalty shoot-out, Peretz saved three penalties in a row, as well as scoring one of his own, to secure Israel's qualification to the final tournament.

During the 2023 U-21 Euros group stage match against Germany, which ended in a 1–1 draw, Peretz saved two penalties, receiving UEFA's Player of the Match award as a result. Peretz also saved a crucial penalty in the penalty shootout during Israel's quarter-final win against host country, Georgia, again receiving the Player of the Match award. Peretz missed Israel's semi-final against eventual winners England due to suspension for an accumulation of yellow cards in each of his two recent matches. Through their performance at the tournament, Israel qualified for the 2024 Olympics.

Peretz was chosen as one of three overage players for the 2024 Olympic Games. However, a thigh muscle tendon injury he sustained before the tournament prevented him from participating.

=== Senior ===
Peretz, who also would have been eligible to play for Germany due to his German citizenship, received his first call-up to the Israel national team on 4 October 2021, ahead of the 2022 FIFA World Cup qualifiers matches against Scotland and Moldova. On 20 November 2022, he made his debut for the Israeli senior squad, in a friendly match against Cyprus which ended in a 2–3 home loss.

== Career statistics ==
=== Club ===
As of match played 21 November 2026

Appearances and goals by club, season and competition
Club	Season	League			National cup (Note: Includes Israel State Cup, DFB-Pokal, FA Cup)		League cup (Note: Includes Toto Cup, EFL Cup)		Europe		Other		Total	
Club	Season	Division	Apps	Goals	Apps	Goals	Apps	Goals	Apps	Goals	Apps	Goals	Apps	Goals
Beitar Tel Aviv Bat Yam (loan)	2019–20	Liga Leumit	32	2	0	0	4	0	—		—		36	2
Maccabi Tel Aviv	2020–21	Israeli Premier League	0	0	0	0	1	0	0	0	0	0	1	0
Maccabi Tel Aviv	2021–22	Israeli Premier League	36	0	0	0	0	0	13 (Note: Appearances in UEFA Europa Conference League)	0	1 (Note: Appearance in Israel Super Cup)	0	50	0
Maccabi Tel Aviv	2022–23	Israeli Premier League	35	0	4	0	1	0	6	0	—		46	0
Maccabi Tel Aviv	2023–24	Israeli Premier League	0	0	—		1	0	5	0	—		6	0
Maccabi Tel Aviv	Total		71	0	4	0	3	0	24	0	1	0	103	0
Bayern Munich	2023–24	Bundesliga	1	0	1	0	—		0	0	—		2	0
Bayern Munich	2024–25	Bundesliga	3	0	1	0	—		1 (Note: Appearance in UEFA Champions League)	0	0	0	5	0
Bayern Munich	Total		4	0	2	0	—		1	0	0	0	7	0
Bayern Munich II	2024–25	Regionalliga Bayern	1	0	—		—		—		—		1	0
Hamburger SV (loan)	2025–26	Bundesliga	0	0	2	0	—		—		—		2	0
Southampton (loan)	2025–26	Championship	20	0	4	0	—		—		2 (Note: Appearances in Championship play-offs)	0	26	0
Southampton	2026–27	Championship	16	0	0	0	2	0	—		—		18	0
Career total			144	2	12	0	9	0	25	0	3	0	193	2

=== International ===
As of match played 14 November 2026

Appearances and goals by national team and year
National team	Year	Apps	Goals
Israel	2022	1	0
Israel	2023	1	0
Israel	2024	2	0
Israel	2025	6	0
Israel	2026	5	0
Total		15	0

== Honours ==
Maccabi Tel Aviv

- Israel State Cup: 2020–21
- Israel Toto Cup (Ligat Ha'Al): 2020–21
- Israel Super Cup: 2020

Bayern Munich

- Bundesliga: 2024–25

== See also ==
- List of Jewish footballers
- List of Jews in sports
- List of Israelis
- List of Israel international footballers
- List of foreign Bundesliga players#UEFA#Israel
