= Matan Hozez =

Israeli footballer

Personal information
- Date of birth: 12 August 1996 (age 30)
- Place of birth: Tel Aviv, Israel
- Position: Attacking midfielder

Team information
- Current team: Hapoel Jerusalem
- Number: 7

Youth career
- Maccabi Tel Aviv

Senior career*
Years	Team	Apps	(Gls)
2015–2024	Maccabi Tel Aviv	65	(7)
2015–2016	→ Beitar Tel Aviv Ramla (loan)	26	(10)
2016–2017	→ Hapoel Ashkelon (loan)	21	(1)
2017–2018	→ Bnei Yehuda Tel Aviv (loan)	34	(6)
2019	→ Hapoel Haifa (loan)	16	(5)
2023–2024	→ Hapoel Jerusalem (loan)	29	(7)
2024–	Hapoel Jerusalem	54	(13)

International career
2014	Israel U19	8	(4)
2016–2018	Israel U21	9	(0)
- * Club domestic league appearances and goals as of 24 June 2026

Matan Hozez (Hebrew: מתן חוזז; born 12 August 1996) is an Israeli footballer who plays as an attacking midfielder for Israeli Premier League club Hapoel Jerusalem.

== Early life ==
Hozez was born in Tel Aviv, Israel, to a family of Sephardic Jewish descent.

== Honours ==
=== Club ===
Maccabi Tel Aviv

- Israeli Premier League (1): 2019-20
- Israel State Cup (1): 2020-21
- Toto Cup (1): 2020-21
- Israel Super Cup (1): 2020
