= 2020–21 UEFA Champions League qualifying =

European football tournament

2020–21 UEFA Champions League qualifying was the preliminary phase of the 2020–21 UEFA Champions League, prior to the competition proper. Qualification consisted of the qualifying phase (preliminary and first to third rounds) and the play-off round. It began on 8 August and ended on 30 September 2020.

A total of 53 teams competed in the qualifying system of the 2020–21 UEFA Champions League, with 43 teams in Champions Path and 10 teams in League Path. The six winners in the play-off round (four from Champions Path, two from League Path) advanced to the group stage, to join the 26 teams that enter in the group stage.

Times are CEST (UTC+2), as listed by UEFA (local times, if different, are in parentheses).

== Teams ==
=== Champions Path ===
The Champions Path included all league champions which did not qualify directly for the group stage, and consisted of the following rounds:

- Preliminary round (4 teams playing one-legged semi-finals and final): 4 teams which entered in this round.
- First qualifying round (34 teams): 33 teams which entered in this round, and 1 winner of the preliminary round.
- Second qualifying round (20 teams): 3 teams which entered in this round, and 17 winners of the first qualifying round.
- Third qualifying round (10 teams): 10 winners of the second qualifying round.
- Play-off round (8 teams): 3 teams which entered in this round, and 5 winners of the third qualifying round.

All teams eliminated from the Champions Path entered the Europa League:

- The 3 losers of the preliminary round and 17 losers of the first qualifying round entered the Champions Path second qualifying round.
- Among the 10 losers of the second qualifying round:
  - 8 losers entered the Champions Path third qualifying round
  - 2 losers, determined by a draw held on 31 August 2020 after the Europa League second qualifying round draw, enteree the Champions Path play-off round.
- The 5 losers of the third qualifying round entered the Champions Path play-off round.
- The 4 losers of the play-off round entered the group stage.

Below were the participating teams of the Champions Path (with their 2020 UEFA club coefficients), grouped by their starting rounds.

Key to colours
Winners of play-off round advanced to group stage
Losers of play-off round entered Europa League group stage
Losers of third qualifying round, and two losers of second qualifying round (Tirana and Ludogorets Razgrad), entered Europa League play-off round
Losers of second qualifying round entered Europa League third qualifying round
Losers of preliminary round and first qualifying round entered Europa League second qualifying round

Play-off round
Team	Coeff.
(Austria) Red Bull Salzburg	53.500
(Greece) Olympiacos	43.000
(Czech Republic) Slavia Prague	27.500

Second qualifying round
Team	Coeff.
(Croatia) Dinamo Zagreb	33.500
(Switzerland) Young Boys	25.500
(Denmark) Midtjylland	14.500

First qualifying round
Team	Coeff.
(Scotland) Celtic	34.000
(Kazakhstan) Astana	29.000
(Bulgaria) Ludogorets Razgrad	26.000
(Serbia) Red Star Belgrade	22.750
(Azerbaijan) Qarabağ	21.000
(Poland) Legia Warsaw	17.000
(Israel) Maccabi Tel Aviv	16.500
(Norway) Molde	15.000
(Moldova) Sheriff Tiraspol	12.750
(Romania) CFR Cluj	12.500
(Hungary) Ferencváros	9.000
(Republic of Ireland) Dundalk	8.500
(Slovakia) Slovan Bratislava	7.000
(Lithuania) Sūduva	6.750
(Cyprus) Omonia	5.350
(Bosnia and Herzegovina) Sarajevo	4.750
(Georgia (country)) Dinamo Tbilisi	4.750
(Luxembourg) Fola Esch	4.750
(Sweden) Djurgårdens IF	4.550
(Montenegro) Budućnost Podgorica	4.250
(Estonia) Flora	4.000
(Belarus) Dynamo Brest	3.775
(Latvia) Riga	3.500
(Wales) Connah's Quay Nomads	3.250
(Faroe Islands) KÍ	2.750
(Gibraltar) Europa	2.750
(Slovenia) Celje	2.600
Ararat-Armenia	2.500
(Finland) KuPS	2.500
(Iceland) KR	2.500
(Albania) Tirana	1.475
(North Macedonia) Sileks	1.475
(Malta) Floriana	1.150

Preliminary round
Team	Coeff.
(Northern Ireland) Linfield	4.250
(San Marino) Tre Fiori	1.500
(Kosovo) Drita	1.500
(Andorra) Inter Club d'Escaldes	0.566

=== League Path ===
The League Path included all league non-champions which did not qualify directly for the group stage, and consisted of the following rounds:

- Second qualifying round (6 teams): 6 teams which entered in this round.
- Third qualifying round (6 teams): 3 teams which entered in this round, and 3 winners of the second qualifying round.
- Play-off round (4 teams): 1 team which entered in this round, and 3 winners of the third qualifying round.

All teams eliminated from the League Path entered the Europa League:

- The 3 losers of the second qualifying round entered the Main Path third qualifying round.
- The 3 losers of the third qualifying round and the 2 losers of the play-off round entered the group stage.

Below were the participating teams of the League Path (with their 2020 UEFA club coefficients), grouped by their starting rounds.

Key to colours
Winners of play-off round advanced to group stage
Losers of play-off round and third qualifying round entered Europa League group stage
Losers of second qualifying round entered Europa League third qualifying round

Play-off round
Team	Coeff.
(Russia) Krasnodar	35.500

Third qualifying round
Team	Coeff.
(Portugal) Benfica	70.000
(Ukraine) Dynamo Kyiv	55.000
(Belgium) Gent	39.500

Second qualifying round
Team	Coeff.
(Turkey) Beşiktaş	54.000
(Czech Republic) Viktoria Plzeň	34.000
(Austria) Rapid Wien	22.000
(Greece) PAOK	21.000
(Netherlands) AZ	18.500
(Croatia) Lokomotiva Zagreb	4.975

== Format ==
In a change to the format as a result of the COVID-19 pandemic in Europe, each tie prior to the play-off round was played as a single-legged match hosted by one of the teams decided by draw, except for the preliminary round which was played at neutral venue. If scores were level at the end of normal time, extra time was played, followed by a penalty shoot-out if the scores remained tied.

The play-off round ties were played over two legs, with each team playing one leg at home. The team that scored more goals on aggregate over the two legs advanced to the next round. If the aggregate score was level, the away goals rule was applied, i.e. the team that scored more goals away from home over the two legs advanced. If away goals were also equal, then extra time was played. The away goals rule was again applied after extra time, i.e. if there were goals scored during extra time and the aggregate score was still level, the visiting team advanced by virtue of more away goals scored. If no goals were scored during extra time, the tie was decided by a penalty shoot-out.

In each draw, teams were seeded based on their 2020 UEFA club coefficients. For any team whose club coefficients were not final at the time of a draw, their club coefficients at that time, taking into account of all 2019–20 UEFA Champions League and Europa League matches played up to that point, were used (Regulations Article 13.03). Teams were divided into seeded and unseeded pots containing the same number of teams, and a seeded team was drawn against an unseeded team. For each tie, a draw was made between the two teams, and the first team drawn was the home team in single-legged matches (or the administrative "home" team in preliminary round matches), or home team of the first leg in play-off round two-legged ties. If the identity of the winners of the previous round was not known at the time of the draws, the seeding was carried out under the assumption that the team with the higher coefficient of an undecided tie advanced to this round, which means if the team with the lower coefficient was to advance, it simply took the seeding of its opponent. Teams from associations with political conflicts could not be drawn into the same tie. Prior to the draws, UEFA may form "groups" in accordance with the principles set by the Club Competitions Committee and based on geographical, logistical and political reasons, and they were purely for convenience of the draw and did not resemble any real groupings in the sense of the competition.

Due to the COVID-19 pandemic in Europe, all qualifying matches were played behind closed doors. The following special rules were applicable to the qualifying phase and play-offs:

- Prior to each draw, UEFA published the list of known travel restrictions related to the COVID-19 pandemic. All teams had to inform UEFA if there were other existing restrictions other than those published. If a team failed to do so as a consequence of which the match could not take place, the team was considered responsible and to have forfeited the match.
- If travel restrictions imposed by the home team's country prevented the away team from entering, the home team had to propose an alternative venue that allowed the match to take place without any restrictions. Otherwise they would have been considered to have forfeited the match.
- If travel restrictions imposed by the away team's country prevented the away team from leaving or returning, the home team had to propose an alternative venue that allowed the match to take place without any restrictions. Otherwise UEFA decided on a venue.
- If after the draw, new restrictions imposed by either the home team's or away team's country prevented the match from taking place, the team of that country were considered to have forfeited the match.
- If either team refused to play the match, they were considered to have forfeited the match. If both teams refused to play or were responsible for a match not taking place, both teams would have been disqualified.
- If a team had players and/or officials tested positive for SARS-2 coronavirus preventing them from playing the match before the deadline set by UEFA, they were considered to have forfeited the match.
- In all cases, the two teams could have agreed to play the match at the away team's country or at a neutral country, subject to UEFA's approval. UEFA had the final authority to decide on a venue for any match, or to reschedule any match if necessary.
- If, for any reason, the qualifying phase and play-offs could not be completed before the deadline set by UEFA, UEFA would have decided on the principles for determining the teams qualified for the group stage.

Four countries (Poland, Hungary, Greece and Cyprus) had provided neutral venue hubs which allowed matches to be played at their stadiums without restrictions.

== Schedule ==
The schedule of the competition was as follows (all draws were held at the UEFA headquarters in Nyon, Switzerland). The tournament would originally have started in June 2020, but had been delayed to August due to the COVID-19 pandemic in Europe. The new schedule was announced by the UEFA Executive Committee on 17 June 2020.

Round	Draw date	Match dates	
Preliminary round	17 July 2020	8 August 2020 (semi-final round)	11 August 2020 (final round)
First qualifying round	9 August 2020	18–19 August 2020	
Second qualifying round	10 August 2020	25–26 August 2020	
Third qualifying round	31 August 2020	15–16 September 2020	
Play-off round	1 September 2020	22–23 September 2020 (first leg)	29–30 September 2020 (second leg)

The original schedule of the competition, as planned before the pandemic, was as follows (all draws held at the UEFA headquarters in Nyon, Switzerland, unless stated otherwise).

Original schedule
Round	Draw date	First leg	Second leg
Preliminary round	9 June 2020	23 June 2020 (semi-final round)	26 June 2020 (final round)
First qualifying round	16 June 2020	7–8 July 2020	14–15 July 2020
Second qualifying round	17 June 2020	21–22 July 2020	28–29 July 2020
Third qualifying round	20 July 2020	4–5 August 2020	11 August 2020
Play-off round	3 August 2020	18–19 August 2020	25–26 August 2020

== Preliminary round ==
The draw for the preliminary round was held on 17 July 2020, 12:00 CEST.

=== Seeding ===
A total of four teams played in the preliminary round. As the draw was held before the UEFA entry deadline and the participating teams were not yet confirmed, only the associations of the teams were used, and seeding of teams was based on their association coefficients instead of their club coefficients. For the semi-final round, two teams (from associations 52 and 53, Northern Ireland and Kosovo) were seeded and two teams (from associations 54 and 55, Andorra and San Marino) were unseeded. The first team drawn in each tie in the semi-final round and the final round would be the administrative "home" team.

Seeded	Unseeded
(Northern Ireland) Linfield; (Kosovo) Drita	(Andorra) Inter Club d'Escaldes; (San Marino) Tre Fiori

=== Bracket ===
Semi-final round
8 August – Nyon
(Kosovo) Drita	2
(Andorra) Inter Club d'Escaldes	1
8 August – Nyon
(San Marino) Tre Fiori	0
(Northern Ireland) Linfield	2

Final round
11 August – Nyon
(Kosovo) Drita	0
(Northern Ireland) Linfield	3

=== Summary ===
The semi-finals were played on 8 August at the Colovray Stadium in Nyon, Switzerland. The final was due to be played at the same venue on 11 August but the match was cancelled due to Drita players being put into quarantine after two players had tested positive for SARS-2 coronavirus, and Linfield were awarded a technical 3–0 win.

The losers of both semi-final and final rounds entered the 2020–21 UEFA Europa League second qualifying round.

Team 1	Score	Team 2
Semi-final round
Tre Fiori (San Marino)	0–2	(Northern Ireland) Linfield
Drita (Kosovo)	2–1	(Andorra) Inter Club d'Escaldes
Final round
Drita (Kosovo)	0–3 (Note: Linfield were awarded a 3–0 win after the match was cancelled due to Drita players testing positive for SARS-CoV-2.)	(Northern Ireland) Linfield

=== Semi-final round ===
8 August 2020
15:00

Tre Fiori (San Marino)	0–2	(Northern Ireland) Linfield
	Report	Héry 71'; Manzinga 83'

Colovray Stadium, Nyon
Attendance: 0
Referee: Balázs Berke (Hungary)

8 August 2020
19:30

Drita (Kosovo)	2–1	(Andorra) Inter Club d'Escaldes
X. Shabani 21'; Namani 45+3'	Report	García 29'

Colovray Stadium, Nyon
Attendance: 0
Referee: Robert Jenkins (Wales)

=== Final round ===
11 August 2020
18:00

Drita (Kosovo)	0–3 Awarded (Note: The Drita v Linfield match, originally scheduled to be played on 11 August 2020, could not be played due to two players from Drita testing positive for SARS-2 coronavirus and the whole team being put into quarantine by the Swiss authorities. Linfield were subsequently awarded a technical 3–0 victory by UEFA according to the regulations related to COVID-19.)	(Northern Ireland) Linfield
	Report

Colovray Stadium, Nyon
Referee: Ioannis Papadopoulos (Greece)

== First qualifying round ==
The draw for the first qualifying round was held on 9 August 2020, 12:00 CEST.

=== Seeding ===
A total of 34 teams played in the first qualifying round: 33 teams which entered in this round, and 1 winner of the preliminary round. Seeding of teams was based on their 2020 UEFA club coefficients. For the winner of the preliminary round, whose identity was not known at the time of draw, the club coefficient of the highest-ranked remaining team was used. The first team drawn in each tie would be the home team.

Group 1		Group 2		Group 3	
Seeded	Unseeded	Seeded	Unseeded	Seeded	Unseeded
(Scotland) Celtic; (Poland) Legia Warsaw; (Hungary) Ferencváros	(Sweden) Djurgårdens IF; (Northern Ireland) Linfield; (Iceland) KR	(Serbia) Red Star Belgrade; (Moldova) Sheriff Tiraspol; (Bosnia and Herzegovina) Sarajevo	(Luxembourg) Fola Esch; (Wales) Connah's Quay Nomads; (Gibraltar) Europa	(Bulgaria) Ludogorets Razgrad; (Romania) CFR Cluj; (Cyprus) Omonia	(Montenegro) Budućnost Podgorica; Ararat-Armenia; (Malta) Floriana
Group 4		Group 5			
Seeded	Unseeded	Seeded	Unseeded		
(Kazakhstan) Astana; (Azerbaijan) Qarabağ; (Israel) Maccabi Tel Aviv; (Georgia (country)) Dinamo Tbilisi	(Belarus) Dynamo Brest; (Latvia) Riga; (Albania) Tirana; (North Macedonia) Sileks	(Norway) Molde; (Republic of Ireland) Dundalk; (Slovakia) Slovan Bratislava; (Lithuania) Sūduva	(Estonia) Flora; (Faroe Islands) KÍ; (Slovenia) Celje; (Finland) KuPS		

Notes

1. ^{†} Winner of the preliminary round, whose identity was not known at the time of draw. Teams in italics defeated a team with a higher coefficient, thus effectively taking the coefficient of their opponent in the draw.

=== Summary ===
The matches were played on 18 and 19 August 2020. The match between KÍ and Slovan Bratislava was cancelled due to Slovan Bratislava players being put into quarantine after one player had tested positive for SARS-2 coronavirus, and KÍ were awarded a technical 3–0 win.

The losers entered the 2020–21 UEFA Europa League second qualifying round.

Home team	Score	Away team
Ferencváros (Hungary)	2–0	(Sweden) Djurgårdens IF
Celtic (Scotland)	6–0	(Iceland) KR
Legia Warsaw (Poland)	1–0	(Northern Ireland) Linfield
Sheriff Tiraspol (Moldova)	2–0	(Luxembourg) Fola Esch
Connah's Quay Nomads (Wales)	0–2	(Bosnia and Herzegovina) Sarajevo
Red Star Belgrade (Serbia)	5–0	(Gibraltar) Europa
Budućnost Podgorica (Montenegro)	1–3	(Bulgaria) Ludogorets Razgrad
Ararat-Armenia	0–1 (a.e.t.)	(Cyprus) Omonia
Floriana (Malta)	0–2	(Romania) CFR Cluj
Maccabi Tel Aviv (Israel)	2–0	(Latvia) Riga
Qarabağ (Azerbaijan)	4–0	(North Macedonia) Sileks
Dinamo Tbilisi (Georgia (country))	0–2	(Albania) Tirana
Dynamo Brest (Belarus)	6–3	(Kazakhstan) Astana
Molde (Norway)	5–0	(Finland) KuPS
Flora (Estonia)	1–1 (a.e.t.) (2–4 p)	(Lithuania) Sūduva
Celje (Slovenia)	3–0	(Republic of Ireland) Dundalk
KÍ (Faroe Islands)	3–0 (Note: KÍ were awarded a 3–0 win after the match was cancelled due to Slovan Bratislava players testing positive for SARS-CoV-2.)	(Slovakia) Slovan Bratislava

=== Matches ===
19 August 2020
19:00

Ferencváros (Hungary)	2–0	(Sweden) Djurgårdens IF
Nguen 33', 62'	Report

Groupama Arena, Budapest
Attendance: 0
Referee: Fedayi San (Switzerland)

18 August 2020
20:45 (19:45 UTC+1)

Celtic (Scotland)	6–0	(Iceland) KR
Elyounoussi 6', 90+1'; Aðalsteinsson 17' (o.g.); Jullien 31'; Taylor 46'; Édouard 72'	Report

Celtic Park, Glasgow
Attendance: 0
Referee: Sebastian Gishamer (Austria)

18 August 2020
19:00

Legia Warsaw (Poland)	1–0	(Northern Ireland) Linfield
Kanté 82'	Report

Polish Army Stadium, Warsaw
Attendance: 0
Referee: Nicolas Laforge (Belgium)

19 August 2020
20:00 (21:00 UTC+3)

Sheriff Tiraspol (Moldova)	2–0	(Luxembourg) Fola Esch
Abang 36'; Lukić 80'	Report

Sheriff Stadium, Tiraspol
Attendance: 0
Referee: Balázs Berke (Hungary)

19 August 2020
20:00 (19:00 UTC+1)

Connah's Quay Nomads (Wales)	0–2	(Bosnia and Herzegovina) Sarajevo
	Report	Tatar 16', 65'

Cardiff City Stadium, Cardiff (Note: Connah's Quay Nomads played their home match at Cardiff City Stadium, Cardiff, instead of their regular stadium Deeside Stadium, Connah's Quay, which did not meet UEFA requirements.)
Attendance: 0
Referee: Jamie Robinson (Northern Ireland)

18 August 2020
21:00

Red Star Belgrade (Serbia)	5–0	(Gibraltar) Europa
Ben Nabouhane 35', 44', 52'; Ivanić 78', 87'	Report

Red Star Stadium, Belgrade
Attendance: 0
Referee: Volen Chinkov (Bulgaria)

19 August 2020
20:00

Budućnost Podgorica (Montenegro)	1–3	(Bulgaria) Ludogorets Razgrad
Ćuković 31'	Report	Higinio 12'; Tchibota 25'; Cauly 90+3'

City Stadium, Podgorica
Attendance: 0
Referee: Ferenc Karakó (Hungary)

19 August 2020
17:00 (19:00 UTC+4)

Ararat-Armenia	0–1 (a.e.t.)	(Cyprus) Omonia
	Report	Thiago 94'

Football Academy Stadium, Yerevan
Attendance: 0
Referee: Viktor Shimusik (Belarus)

19 August 2020
21:00

Floriana (Malta)	0–2	(Romania) CFR Cluj
	Report	Cestor 53'; Golofca 90+7'

Centenary Stadium, Ta' Qali
Attendance: 0
Referee: Laurent Kopriwa (Luxembourg)

19 August 2020
19:00 (20:00 UTC+3)

Maccabi Tel Aviv (Israel)	2–0	(Latvia) Riga
Blackman 58' (pen.), 88' (pen.)	Report

Bloomfield Stadium, Tel Aviv
Attendance: 0
Referee: Igor Pajač (Croatia)

18 August 2020
18:00 (20:00 UTC+4)

Qarabağ (Azerbaijan)	4–0	(North Macedonia) Sileks
Romero 11'; Guerrier 40', 51'; Emreli 80'	Report

Tofiq Bahramov Republican Stadium, Baku (Note: Qarabağ played their home matches at Tofiq Bahramov Republican Stadium, Baku, instead of their regular stadium Azersun Arena, Baku, which did not meet UEFA requirements.)
Attendance: 0
Referee: Yaroslav Kozyk (Ukraine)

19 August 2020
19:00 (21:00 UTC+4)

Dinamo Tbilisi (Georgia (country))	0–2	(Albania) Tirana
	Report	Torassa 45+4'; Ismailgeci 86'

Boris Paichadze Dinamo Arena, Tbilisi
Attendance: 0
Referee: Roomer Tarajev (Estonia)

18 August 2020
20:00 (21:00 UTC+3)

Dynamo Brest (Belarus)	6–3	(Kazakhstan) Astana
Gordeichuk 16', 22'; Pyachenin 17'; Sedko 37'; Diallo 55', 90'	Report	Tomasov 45'; Rotariu 53'; Beisebekov 87'

Regional Sport Complex, Brest
Attendance: 0
Referee: Novak Simović (Serbia)

19 August 2020
18:00

Molde (Norway)	5–0	(Finland) KuPS
E. Hestad 26'; Wolff Eikrem 37'; Omoijuanfo 65'; Holmgren Pedersen 87'; Knudtzon 89'	Report

Aker Stadion, Molde
Attendance: 0
Referee: Bryn Markham-Jones (Wales)

19 August 2020
18:30 (19:30 UTC+3)

Flora (Estonia)	1–1 (a.e.t.)	(Lithuania) Sūduva
Sappinen 49'	Report	Topčagić 78' (pen.)
Penalties
Vassiljev (penalty missed); Sappinen (penalty scored); Järvelaid (penalty scored); Soomets (penalty missed)	2–4	(penalty scored) Švrljuga; (penalty scored) Šabala; (penalty missed) Tadić; (penalty scored) Pušić; (penalty scored) Topčagić

Lilleküla Stadium, Tallinn
Attendance: 0
Referee: Nejc Kajtazović (Slovenia)

19 August 2020
19:00

Celje (Slovenia)	3–0	(Republic of Ireland) Dundalk
Kerin 43'; Vizinger 89'; Dangubić 90+5'	Report

Szusza Ferenc Stadion, Budapest, Hungary (Note: The Celje v Dundalk match was played at Szusza Ferenc Stadion, Budapest, Hungary, instead of Celje's regular stadium Stadion Z'dežele, Celje, due to travel restrictions related to the COVID-19 pandemic between Slovenia and Ireland.)
Attendance: 0
Referee: Vítor Ferreira (Portugal)

21 August 2020 (Note: The KÍ v Slovan Bratislava match, originally scheduled to be played on 19 August 2020, was postponed to 21 August 2020 due to one staff member from Slovan Bratislava testing positive for SARS-2 coronavirus and the whole team being put into quarantine by the Faroese authorities. On 21 August, the match could not be played due to one player from Slovan Bratislava testing positive for SARS-2 coronavirus and the whole second team being put into quarantine by the Faroese authorities. KÍ were subsequently awarded a technical 3–0 victory by UEFA according to the regulations related to COVID-19.)
18:00 (17:00 UTC+1)

KÍ (Faroe Islands)	3–0 Awarded	(Slovakia) Slovan Bratislava
	Report

Við Djúpumýrar, Klaksvík
Referee: Kristoffer Hagenes (Norway)

== Second qualifying round ==
The draw for the second qualifying round was held on 10 August 2020, 12:00 CEST.

=== Seeding ===
A total of 26 teams played in the second qualifying round. They were divided into two paths:

- Champions Path (20 teams): 3 teams which entered in this round, and 17 winners of the first qualifying round.
- League Path (6 teams): 6 teams which entered in this round.

Seeding of teams was based on their 2020 UEFA club coefficients. For the winners of the first qualifying round, whose identity was not known at the time of draw, the club coefficient of the highest-ranked remaining team in each tie was used. The first team drawn in each tie would be the home team.

Champions Path
Group 1		Group 2		Group 3	
Seeded	Unseeded	Seeded	Unseeded	Seeded	Unseeded
(Scotland) Celtic; (Croatia) Dinamo Zagreb; (Switzerland) Young Boys	(Romania) CFR Cluj; (Hungary) Ferencváros; (Faroe Islands) KÍ	(Poland) Legia Warsaw; (Israel) Maccabi Tel Aviv; (Norway) Molde	(Slovenia) Celje; (Lithuania) Sūduva; (Cyprus) Omonia	(Belarus) Dynamo Brest; (Bulgaria) Ludogorets Razgrad; (Serbia) Red Star Belgrade; (Azerbaijan) Qarabağ	(Denmark) Midtjylland; (Moldova) Sheriff Tiraspol; (Bosnia and Herzegovina) Sarajevo; (Albania) Tirana

Notes

1. ^{†} Winners of the first qualifying round, whose identity was not known at the time of draw. Teams in italics defeated a team with a higher coefficient, thus effectively taking the coefficient of their opponent in the draw.

League Path
Seeded	Unseeded
(Turkey) Beşiktaş; (Czech Republic) Viktoria Plzeň; (Austria) Rapid Wien	(Greece) PAOK; (Netherlands) AZ; (Croatia) Lokomotiva Zagreb

=== Summary ===
The matches were played on 25 and 26 August 2020.

From the ten losers of Champions Path, two teams, Tirana and Ludogorets Razgrad, determined by a draw held on 31 August 2020 after the Europa League second qualifying round draw, entered the 2020–21 UEFA Europa League play-off round (Champions Path), while the other eight teams entered the 2020–21 UEFA Europa League third qualifying round (Champions Path). The losers of League Path entered the 2020–21 UEFA Europa League third qualifying round (Main Path).

Home team	Score	Away team
Champions Path
CFR Cluj (Romania)	2–2 (a.e.t.) (5–6 p)	(Croatia) Dinamo Zagreb
Young Boys (Switzerland)	3–1	(Faroe Islands) KÍ
Celtic (Scotland)	1–2	(Hungary) Ferencváros
Sūduva (Lithuania)	0–3	(Israel) Maccabi Tel Aviv
Legia Warsaw (Poland)	0–2 (a.e.t.)	(Cyprus) Omonia
Celje (Slovenia)	1–2	(Norway) Molde
Ludogorets Razgrad (Bulgaria)	0–1	(Denmark) Midtjylland
Dynamo Brest (Belarus)	2–1	(Bosnia and Herzegovina) Sarajevo
Qarabağ (Azerbaijan)	2–1	(Moldova) Sheriff Tiraspol
Tirana (Albania)	0–1	(Serbia) Red Star Belgrade
League Path
AZ (Netherlands)	3–1 (a.e.t.)	(Czech Republic) Viktoria Plzeň
PAOK (Greece)	3–1	(Turkey) Beşiktaş
Lokomotiva Zagreb (Croatia)	0–1	(Austria) Rapid Wien

=== Champions Path matches ===
26 August 2020
20:00 (21:00 UTC+3)

CFR Cluj (Romania)	2–2 (a.e.t.)	(Croatia) Dinamo Zagreb
Pereira 64'; Debeljuh 90+3'	Report	Gojak 14'; Kastrati 78'
Penalties
Paulo Vinícius (penalty scored); Đoković (penalty scored); Rondón (penalty scored); Sušić (penalty scored); Golofca (penalty missed); Deac (penalty scored); Boli (penalty missed)	5–6	(penalty scored) Petković; (penalty scored) Leovac; (penalty scored) Ademi; (penalty scored) Stojanović; (penalty missed) Gojak; (penalty scored) Dilaver; (penalty scored) Gvardiol

Stadionul Dr. Constantin Rădulescu, Cluj-Napoca
Attendance: 0
Referee: António Nobre (Portugal)

26 August 2020
20:15

Young Boys (Switzerland)	3–1	(Faroe Islands) KÍ
Nsame 51'; Sulejmani 57'; Ngamaleu 82'	Report	J. Johannesen 79'

Stadion Wankdorf, Bern
Attendance: 0
Referee: Athanasios Tzilos (Greece)

26 August 2020
20:45 (19:45 UTC+1)

Celtic (Scotland)	1–2	(Hungary) Ferencváros
Christie 53'	Report	Sigér 7'; Nguen 75'

Celtic Park, Glasgow
Attendance: 0
Referee: Allard Lindhout (Netherlands)

26 August 2020
18:00 (19:00 UTC+3)

Sūduva (Lithuania)	0–3	(Israel) Maccabi Tel Aviv
	Report	Rikan 30'; Blackman 73'; Davidzada 90+2'

Sūduva Stadium, Marijampolė
Attendance: 0
Referee: Rade Obrenovič (Slovenia)

26 August 2020
20:00

Legia Warsaw (Poland)	0–2 (a.e.t.)	(Cyprus) Omonia
	Report	Gómez 92' (pen.); Thiago 107'

Polish Army Stadium, Warsaw
Attendance: 0
Referee: Nathan Verboomen (Belgium)

26 August 2020
18:00

Celje (Slovenia)	1–2	(Norway) Molde
Lotrič 38'	Report	Hussain 57'; James 74'

Stadion Z'dežele, Celje
Attendance: 0
Referee: Christopher Jäger (Austria)

26 August 2020
19:30 (20:30 UTC+3)

Ludogorets Razgrad (Bulgaria)	0–1	(Denmark) Midtjylland
	Report	Júnior Brumado 77'

Huvepharma Arena, Razgrad
Attendance: 0
Referee: Denys Shurman (Ukraine)

26 August 2020
20:00 (21:00 UTC+3)

Dynamo Brest (Belarus)	2–1	(Bosnia and Herzegovina) Sarajevo
Gordeichuk 3'; Diallo 49'	Report	Đokanović 34'

Regional Sport Complex, Brest
Attendance: 0
Referee: Loukas Sotiriou (Cyprus)

26 August 2020
18:00 (20:00 UTC+4)

Qarabağ (Azerbaijan)	2–1	(Moldova) Sheriff Tiraspol
Matić 22' (pen.); Emreli 63'	Report	Castañeda 78'

Tofiq Bahramov Republican Stadium, Baku
Attendance: 0
Referee: Mykola Balakin (Ukraine)

25 August 2020
20:00

Tirana (Albania)	0–1	(Serbia) Red Star Belgrade
	Report	Tomané 62'

Arena Kombëtare, Tirana (Note: Tirana played their home match at Arena Kombëtare, Tirana, instead of their regular stadium Selman Stërmasi Stadium, Tirana.)
Attendance: 0
Referee: Kaspar Sjöberg (Sweden)

=== League Path matches ===
26 August 2020
16:30

AZ (Netherlands)	3–1 (a.e.t.)	(Czech Republic) Viktoria Plzeň
Koopmeiners 90+5' (pen.); Guðmundsson 98', 118'	Report	Limberský 78'

AFAS Stadion, Alkmaar
Attendance: 0
Referee: Luís Godinho (Portugal)

25 August 2020
20:00 (21:00 UTC+3)

PAOK (Greece)	3–1	(Turkey) Beşiktaş
Tzolis 7', 24'; Pelkas 30'	Report	Larin 37'

Toumba Stadium, Thessaloniki
Attendance: 0
Referee: Daniele Doveri (Italy)

26 August 2020
19:00

Lokomotiva Zagreb (Croatia)	0–1	(Austria) Rapid Wien
	Report	Kara 32'

Stadion Kranjčevićeva, Zagreb
Attendance: 0
Referee: Juan Martínez Munuera (Spain)

== Third qualifying round ==
The draw for the third qualifying round was held on 31 August 2020, 12:00 CEST.

=== Seeding ===
A total of 16 teams played in the third qualifying round. They were divided into two paths:

- Champions Path (10 teams): 10 winners of the second qualifying round (Champions Path).
- League Path (6 teams): 3 teams which entered in this round, and 3 winners of the second qualifying round (League Path).

Seeding of teams was based on their 2020 UEFA club coefficients. The first team drawn in each tie would be the home team.

Champions Path
Seeded	Unseeded
(Croatia) Dinamo Zagreb; (Switzerland) Young Boys; (Serbia) Red Star Belgrade; (Azerbaijan) Qarabağ; (Israel) Maccabi Tel Aviv	(Norway) Molde; (Denmark) Midtjylland; (Hungary) Ferencváros; (Cyprus) Omonia; (Belarus) Dynamo Brest

Notes

1. ^{†} Winners of the second qualifying round (Champions Path).

League Path
Seeded	Unseeded
(Portugal) Benfica; (Ukraine) Dynamo Kyiv; (Belgium) Gent	(Austria) Rapid Wien; (Greece) PAOK; (Netherlands) AZ

Notes

1. ^{†} Winners of the second qualifying round (League Path).

=== Summary ===
The matches were played on 15 and 16 September 2020.

The losers of Champions Path entered the 2020–21 UEFA Europa League play-off round (Champions Path). The losers of League Path entered the 2020–21 UEFA Europa League group stage.

Home team	Score	Away team
Champions Path
Ferencváros (Hungary)	2–1	(Croatia) Dinamo Zagreb
Qarabağ (Azerbaijan)	0–0 (a.e.t.) (5–6 p)	(Norway) Molde
Omonia (Cyprus)	1–1 (a.e.t.) (4–2 p)	(Serbia) Red Star Belgrade
Midtjylland (Denmark)	3–0	(Switzerland) Young Boys
Maccabi Tel Aviv (Israel)	1–0	(Belarus) Dynamo Brest
League Path
PAOK (Greece)	2–1	(Portugal) Benfica
Dynamo Kyiv (Ukraine)	2–0	(Netherlands) AZ
Gent (Belgium)	2–1	(Austria) Rapid Wien

=== Champions Path matches ===
16 September 2020
19:00

Ferencváros (Hungary)	2–1	(Croatia) Dinamo Zagreb
Lovrencsics 2'; Uzuni 65'	Report	Uzuni 23' (o.g.)

Groupama Arena, Budapest
Attendance: 0
Referee: Tobias Stieler (Germany)

16 September 2020
19:00 (20:00 UTC+3)

Qarabağ (Azerbaijan)	0–0 (a.e.t.)	(Norway) Molde
	Report
Penalties
Matić (penalty scored); Medvedev (penalty scored); Andrade (penalty scored); Medina (penalty scored); Mahammadaliyev (penalty scored); B. Huseynov (penalty missed)	5–6	(penalty scored) Omoijuanfo; (penalty scored) Aursnes; (penalty scored) Hestad; (penalty scored) Christensen; (penalty scored) Ellingsen; (penalty scored) Haugen

AEK Arena – Georgios Karapatakis, Larnaca, Cyprus (Note: The Qarabağ v Molde match was played at AEK Arena – Georgios Karapatakis, Larnaca, Cyprus, instead of Qarabağ's regular stadium Azersun Arena, Baku, due to travel restrictions related to the COVID-19 pandemic between Azerbaijan and Norway.)
Attendance: 0
Referee: Srđan Jovanović (Serbia)

16 September 2020
17:00 (18:00 UTC+3)

Omonia (Cyprus)	1–1 (a.e.t.)	(Serbia) Red Star Belgrade
Lüftner 31'	Report	Ivanić 45+1'
Penalties
Gómez (penalty scored); Gomes (penalty scored); Asante (penalty scored); Lecjaks (penalty scored)	4–2	(penalty scored) Gavrić; (penalty scored) Ben Nabouhane; (penalty missed) Falcinelli; (penalty missed) Degenek

GSP Stadium, Nicosia
Attendance: 0
Referee: Chris Kavanagh (England)

16 September 2020
20:30

Midtjylland (Denmark)	3–0	(Switzerland) Young Boys
Lefort 51' (o.g.); Dreyer 62'; Mabil 84'	Report

MCH Arena, Herning
Attendance: 0
Referee: Georgi Kabakov (Bulgaria)

16 September 2020
19:00 (20:00 UTC+3)

Maccabi Tel Aviv (Israel)	1–0	(Belarus) Dynamo Brest
Biton 50' (pen.)	Report

Bloomfield Stadium, Tel Aviv
Attendance: 0
Referee: Davide Massa (Italy)

=== League Path matches ===
15 September 2020
20:00 (21:00 UTC+3)

PAOK (Greece)	2–1	(Portugal) Benfica
Giannoulis 63'; Živković 75'	Report	Rafa 90+4'

Toumba Stadium, Thessaloniki
Attendance: 0
Referee: Felix Brych (Germany)

15 September 2020
19:00 (20:00 UTC+3)

Dynamo Kyiv (Ukraine)	2–0	(Netherlands) AZ
Rodrigues 49'; Shaparenko 86'	Report

NSC Olimpiyskiy, Kyiv
Attendance: 0
Referee: Orel Grinfeld (Israel)

15 September 2020
20:30

Gent (Belgium)	2–1	(Austria) Rapid Wien
Dorsch 36'; Yaremchuk 59' (pen.)	Report	Demir 90+3'

Ghelamco Arena, Ghent
Attendance: 0
Referee: Andreas Ekberg (Sweden)

== Play-off round ==
The draw for the play-off round was held on 1 September 2020, 12:00 CEST.

=== Seeding ===
A total of 12 teams played in the play-off round. They were divided into two paths:

- Champions Path (8 teams): 3 teams which entered in this round, and 5 winners of the third qualifying round (Champions Path).
- League Path (4 teams): 1 team which entered in this round, and 3 winners of the third qualifying round (League Path).

Seeding of teams was based on their 2020 UEFA club coefficients. For the winners of the third qualifying round, whose identity was not known at the time of draw, the club coefficient of the highest-ranked remaining team in each tie was used. The first team drawn in each tie would be the home team of the first leg.

Since Russian and Ukrainian teams may not be drawn into the same tie for political reasons, the winners of the match involving Benfica had to play Krasnodar, and the winners of the match involving Dynamo Kyiv had to play the winners of the match involving Gent.

Champions Path
Seeded	Unseeded
(Austria) Red Bull Salzburg; (Greece) Olympiacos; (Hungary) Ferencváros; (Czech Republic) Slavia Prague	(Denmark) Midtjylland; (Cyprus) Omonia; (Norway) Molde; (Israel) Maccabi Tel Aviv

Notes

1. ^{†} Winners of the third qualifying round (Champions Path), whose identity was not known at the time of draw. Teams in italics defeated a team with a higher coefficient, thus effectively taking the coefficient of their opponent in the draw.

League Path
Seeded	Unseeded
(Greece) PAOK; (Ukraine) Dynamo Kyiv	(Belgium) Gent; (Russia) Krasnodar

Notes

1. ^{†} Winners of the third qualifying round (League Path), whose identity was not known at the time of draw. Teams in italics defeated a team with a higher coefficient, thus effectively taking the coefficient of their opponent in the draw.

=== Summary ===
The first legs were played on 22 and 23 September, and the second legs were played on 29 and 30 September 2020.

The losers of both Champions Path and League Path entered the 2020–21 UEFA Europa League group stage.

Team 1	Agg.	Team 2	1st leg	2nd leg
Champions Path
Slavia Prague (Czech Republic)	1–4	(Denmark) Midtjylland	0–0	1–4
Maccabi Tel Aviv (Israel)	2–5	(Austria) Red Bull Salzburg	1–2	1–3
Olympiacos (Greece)	2–0	(Cyprus) Omonia	2–0	0–0
Molde (Norway)	3–3 (a)	(Hungary) Ferencváros	3–3	0–0
League Path
Krasnodar (Russia)	4–2	(Greece) PAOK	2–1	2–1
Gent (Belgium)	1–5	(Ukraine) Dynamo Kyiv	1–2	0–3

=== Champions Path matches ===
22 September 2020
21:00

Slavia Prague (Czech Republic)	0–0	(Denmark) Midtjylland
	Report

Sinobo Stadium, Prague
Attendance: 0
Referee: Cüneyt Çakır (Turkey)
30 September 2020
21:00

Midtjylland (Denmark)	4–1	(Czech Republic) Slavia Prague
Kaba 65'; Scholz 84' (pen.); Onyeka 88'; Dreyer 90+1'	Report	Olayinka 3'

MCH Arena, Herning
Attendance: 0
Referee: Damir Skomina (Slovenia)

Midtjylland won 4–1 on aggregate.

22 September 2020
21:00 (22:00 UTC+3)

Maccabi Tel Aviv (Israel)	1–2	(Austria) Red Bull Salzburg
Biton 9'	Report	Szoboszlai 49' (pen.); Okugawa 57'

Bloomfield Stadium, Tel Aviv
Attendance: 0
Referee: Michael Oliver (England)
30 September 2020
21:00

Red Bull Salzburg (Austria)	3–1	(Israel) Maccabi Tel Aviv
Daka 16', 68'; Szoboszlai 45+4' (pen.)	Report	Karzev 30'

Stadion Wals-Siezenheim, Wals-Siezenheim
Attendance: 0
Referee: Felix Brych (Germany)

Red Bull Salzburg won 5–2 on aggregate.

23 September 2020
21:00 (22:00 UTC+3)

Olympiacos (Greece)	2–0	(Cyprus) Omonia
Valbuena 69' (pen.); El-Arabi 90+2'	Report

Karaiskakis Stadium, Piraeus
Attendance: 0
Referee: Danny Makkelie (Netherlands)
29 September 2020
21:00 (22:00 UTC+3)

Omonia (Cyprus)	0–0	(Greece) Olympiacos
	Report

GSP Stadium, Nicosia
Attendance: 0
Referee: Antonio Mateu Lahoz (Spain)

Olympiacos won 2–0 on aggregate.

23 September 2020
21:00

Molde (Norway)	3–3	(Hungary) Ferencváros
James 55'; Eikrem 65'; Ellingsen 83'	Report	Boli 7'; Uzuni 52'; Kharatin 87' (pen.)

Aker Stadion, Molde
Attendance: 0
Referee: Carlos del Cerro Grande (Spain)
29 September 2020
21:00

Ferencváros (Hungary)	0–0	(Norway) Molde
	Report

Groupama Arena, Budapest
Attendance: 0
Referee: Björn Kuipers (Netherlands)

3–3 on aggregate; Ferencváros won on away goals.

=== League Path matches ===
22 September 2020
21:00 (22:00 UTC+3)

Krasnodar (Russia)	2–1	(Greece) PAOK
Claesson 39' (pen.); Cabella 70'	Report	Pelkas 32'

Krasnodar Stadium, Krasnodar
Attendance: 0
Referee: Clément Turpin (France)
30 September 2020
21:00 (22:00 UTC+3)

PAOK (Greece)	1–2	(Russia) Krasnodar
El Kaddouri 77'	Report	Michailidis 73' (o.g.); Cabella 78'

Toumba Stadium, Thessaloniki
Attendance: 0
Referee: Daniele Orsato (Italy)

Krasnodar won 4–2 on aggregate.

23 September 2020
21:00

Gent (Belgium)	1–2	(Ukraine) Dynamo Kyiv
Kleindienst 41'	Report	Supriaha 9'; De Pena 79'

Ghelamco Arena, Ghent
Attendance: 0
Referee: Ovidiu Hațegan (Romania)
29 September 2020
21:00 (22:00 UTC+3)

Dynamo Kyiv (Ukraine)	3–0	(Belgium) Gent
Buyalskyi 9'; De Pena 36' (pen.); Rodrigues 49' (pen.)	Report

NSC Olimpiyskiy, Kyiv
Attendance: 0
Referee: Szymon Marciniak (Poland)

Dynamo Kyiv won 5–1 on aggregate.
