= Nick Blackman =

Barbadian footballer (born 1989)

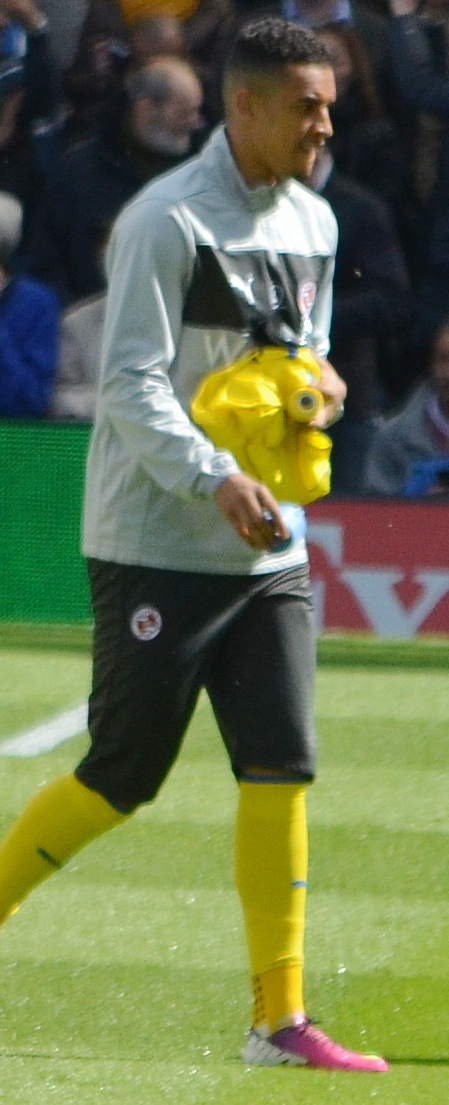
- Blackman with Reading in 2013

Personal information
- Full name: Nicholas Alexander Blackman
- Date of birth: 11 November 1989 (age 37)
- Place of birth: Salford, England
- Position: Forward

Youth career
- 2005–2006: Macclesfield Town

Senior career*
Years	Team	Apps	(Gls)
2006–2009	Macclesfield Town	12	(1)
2009–2012	Blackburn Rovers	1	(0)
2009	→ Blackpool (loan)	5	(1)
2009–2010	→ Oldham Athletic (loan)	12	(1)
2010–2011	→ Motherwell (loan)	19	(10)
2011	→ Aberdeen (loan)	15	(2)
2012–2013	Sheffield United	28	(11)
2013–2016	Reading	103	(18)
2016–2019	Derby County	24	(1)
2017–2018	→ Maccabi Tel Aviv (loan)	31	(10)
2018–2019	→ Sporting de Gijón (loan)	14	(1)
2019–2021	Maccabi Tel Aviv	35	(4)
Total		299	(60)

International career^{‡}
2019–2021	Barbados	6	(3)
- * Club domestic league appearances and goals as of 23:51, 18 December 2025 (UTC) ‡ National team caps and goals as of 3 July 2021

Nicholas Alexander Blackman (born 11 November 1989) is a professional footballer who plays as a forward. He is a free agent. Born in England, he played for the Barbados national team.

== Early life ==
Blackman was born in Salford, Greater Manchester, to a Jewish mother from England and a Christian father from Barbados. His Polish-Jewish maternal grandfather Benjamin Rosenfeld was an Auschwitz/Holocaust survivor and his Dutch-Jewish maternal grandmother Marta. He had a Bar Mitzvah.

Blackman attended Manchester United Academies for five years from the age of eight, and also spent time at Bury and Preston North End academies. He attended King David High School followed by Phillips High School in Manchester.

At the age of 13 Blackman competed in the 2005 Maccabiah Games in Israel as part of a British schools football team.

== Club career ==
=== Macclesfield Town ===
Blackman was signed by Macclesfield Town in Summer 2006. After a string of impressive displays for the youth team Blackman signed his first professional contract at Macclesfield on 8 March 2007. After making his league debut against Accrington Stanley his hopes of regular first team football were dashed by a pre-season injury that kept him out of action for several months.

Blackman scored his debut goal for Macclesfield in a 1–1 home draw with Dagenham & Redbridge on 23 November 2007, when after coming on as a substitute, Blackman scored in the 90th minute. Blackman made a total of 12 appearances for Macclesfield, mostly as a substitute, scoring one goal.

=== Blackburn Rovers ===
Blackman joined Premier League club Blackburn Rovers on 12 January 2009, after impressing in a trial, for an undisclosed fee on a two-and-a-half-year contract. Blackman scored two goals in his first two games for the club's reserve team.

==== Loans to Blackpool and Oldham Athletic ====
On 3 March, Blackman joined Championship club Blackpool on loan initially for one month. Blackman made his debut later that same day as a 65th-minute substitute in a 0–1 home loss to Burnley at Bloomfield Road. After two substitution appearances, Blackman scored on his full debut, a 2–2 draw with Sheffield United at Bramall Lane on 10 March.

On 20 August 2009, Blackman joined Oldham Athletic on a month's loan. Two days later, Blackman made his Latics debut in a 2–2 draw versus Swindon Town, playing the full 90 minutes. His first goal for the club came on 29 August when Blackman curled a shot into the net from the edge of the area for Oldham's only goal in a 1–1 draw against Brentford. His loan period was extended until January 2010 after which Blackman returned to Blackburn.

==== Loans to Motherwell and Aberdeen ====
Blackman joined Scottish Premier League club Motherwell on a six-month loan on 13 August 2010 and scored 10 goals in 18 games in total which, included a hat trick in a 4–0 win over St Johnstone in November 2010. On 13 January 2011, former Motherwell manager Craig Brown signed Blackman for Aberdeen on loan for six-months.

==== Return to Blackburn Rovers ====
Blackman returned to Blackburn Rovers at the end of his loan spell with Aberdeen. During the Premier League Asia Trophy match against Kitchee of Hong Kong, Blackman came off the bench for Blackburn and won and converted a penalty in a 3–0 win.

=== Sheffield United ===
On 10 August 2012, Blackman signed for Sheffield United on a two-year deal for an undisclosed fee reported to be £115,000 plus a 20% sell on after turning down offers from Championship clubs. Blackman scored his first goal for the Blades with his first touch in a League Cup game against Burton Albion at Bramall Lane on 11 August 2012. Blackman played regularly for the Blades throughout the first half of the season, making 33 appearances and scoring 14 goals by the end of January. By this time however, Blackman was attracting interest from other clubs and was the subject of bids from both Crystal Palace and Reading and despite United accepting offers from both clubs, Blackman rejected a move to Palace.

=== Reading ===
On 30 January 2013, Blackman signed for Premier League side Reading for an undisclosed fee, reported to be around £1.35m and a 20% sell on. He signed on a three-and-a-half-year contract. Blackman made his debut on 2 February, replacing Pavel Pogrebnyak in the 72nd minute of a 2–1 win against Sunderland. Blackman scored Reading's first goal of the 2015–16 Championship season in a 2–1 away defeat to Birmingham City.

=== Derby County ===
On 6 January 2016, it was announced that Blackman had signed a three-and-a-half-year deal with Derby County for a reported fee of over £3 million. He scored his only goal for the club, a penalty, in a 2–0 win over Cardiff City on 27 September 2016.

==== Loan to Maccabi Tel Aviv ====
After starting only 12 matches for Derby, Blackman joined Israeli Premier League club Maccabi Tel Aviv on a season-long loan in August 2017. He scored 10 goals in 31 league games. On 22 May 2018 Blackman returned to Derby County after the end of his loan spell.

==== Loan to Sporting de Gijón ====
On 15 August 2018, Blackman joined Sporting de Gijón on a season-long loan. On 9 January 2019, he scored the winning goal in a 2–1 victory over Valencia in the first leg of the round of 16 in the Copa del Rey.

=== Maccabi Tel Aviv ===
After being released by Derby County in July 2019, Blackman signed a two-year contract with Maccabi Tel Aviv on 17 July 2019. In his first season back at the club, Blackman won the Israeli Premier League title. Despite some favourable displays in the early part of the season, Blackman spent large amounts of time away from the first team due to injury.

Blackman scored both goals for Maccabi in the first leg of their victory against Hapoel Be'er Sheva in the Israel Super Cup on 8 August 2020. On 19 August, Blackman again scored twice in a 2–0 victory over Latvian club Riga in the first qualifying round of the 2020–21 UEFA Champions League. Seven days later, he scored in Maccabi's successful second qualifying round win over FK Sūduva of Lithuania in the same competition.

Blackman left the club in the summer of 2021 upon the expiration of his contract.

== International career ==
According to Blackman, he was eligible to represent England, Barbados, the Netherlands, Poland or Israel at international level—Barbados through his father, the Netherlands and Poland through his maternal grandparents, and Israel through "family members". In 2019, Blackman decided to represent Barbados at international level.

Blackman made his debut for Barbados on 5 September 2019, scoring a brace in a 4–0 win over Saint Martin in a CONCACAF Nations League match.

== Career statistics ==
=== Club ===
As of match played 26 August 2020

Appearances and goals by club, season and competition
Club	Season	League			National Cup (Note: Includes FA Cup, Scottish Cup, Israel State Cup, Copa del Rey)		League Cup (Note: Includes Football League Cup/EFL Cup, Scottish League Cup, Toto Cup)		Other (Note: Includes UEFA Champions League, UEFA Europa League, Israel Super Cup)		Total	
Club	Season	Division	Apps	Goals	Apps	Goals	Apps	Goals	Apps	Goals	Apps	Goals
Macclesfield Town	2006–07	League Two	1	0	0	0	0	0	0	0	1	0
Macclesfield Town	2007–08	League Two	11	1	0	0	0	0	0	0	11	1
Macclesfield Town	Total		12	1	0	0	0	0	0	0	12	1
Blackburn Rovers	2008–09	Premier League	0	0	0	0	0	0	—		0	0
Blackburn Rovers	2011–12	Premier League	1	0	0	0	2	0	—		3	0
Blackburn Rovers	Total		1	0	0	0	2	0	—		3	0
Blackpool (loan)	2008–09	Championship	5	1	—		—		—		5	1
Oldham Athletic (loan)	2009–10	League One	12	1	0	0	0	0	1 (Note: Appearance in Football League Trophy)	0	13	1
Motherwell (loan)	2010–11	Scottish Premier League	18	10	0	0	2	0	2 (Note: Appearances in UEFA Europa League)	0	22	10
Aberdeen (loan)	2010–11	Scottish Premier League	15	2	3	0	—		—		18	2
Sheffield United	2012–13	League One	28	11	4	2	1	1	0	0	33	14
Reading	2012–13	Premier League	11	0	0	0	0	0	—		11	0
Reading	2013–14	Championship	30	4	1	0	0	0	—		31	4
Reading	2014–15	Championship	37	3	4	1	2	1	—		43	5
Reading	2015–16	Championship	25	11	0	0	3	2	—		28	13
Reading	Total		103	18	5	1	5	3	—		113	22
Derby County	2015–16	Championship	14	0	2	0	—		1 (Note: Appearance in Football League Championship play-offs)	0	17	0
Derby County	2016–17	Championship	9	1	1	0	2	0	—		12	1
Derby County	Total		23	1	3	0	2	0	1	0	29	1
Maccabi Tel Aviv (loan)	2017–18	Israeli Premier League	31	10	1	0	3	1	5	1	40	12
Sporting de Gijón (loan)	2018–19	Segunda División	14	1	3	1	—		—		17	2
Maccabi Tel Aviv	2019–20	Israeli Premier League	18	1	0	0	1	0	4 (Note: Appearances in UEFA Champions League and UEFA Europa League)	2	23	3
Maccabi Tel Aviv	2020–21	Israeli Premier League	0	0	0	0	0	0	4 (Note: Appearances in UEFA Champions League and Israel Super Cup)	5	4	5
Maccabi Tel Aviv	Total		18	1	0	0	1	0	8	7	27	8
Career total			279	57	19	4	16	5	17	8	331	74

=== International ===
As of match played 3 July 2021

Appearances and goals by national team and year
National team	Year	Apps	Goals
Barbados	2019	5	3
Barbados	2020	0	0
Barbados	2021	1	0
Total		6	3

As of match played 3 July 2021
Scores and results list Barbados' goal tally first.

List of international goals scored by Nick Blackman
No.	Date	Venue	Cap	Opponent	Score	Result	Competition
1	5 September 2019	Wildey Turf, Bridgetown, Barbados	1	Saint Martin	2–0	4–0	2019–20 CONCACAF Nations League C
2	5 September 2019	Wildey Turf, Bridgetown, Barbados	1	Saint Martin	3–0	4–0	2019–20 CONCACAF Nations League C
3	12 October 2019	Wildey Turf, Bridgetown, Barbados	3	U.S. Virgin Islands	1–0	1–0	2019–20 CONCACAF Nations League C

== Honours ==
Maccabi Tel Aviv

- Israeli Premier League: 2019–20
- Toto Cup: 2017–18, 2020–21
- Israel Super Cup: 2020

== See also ==
- List of select Jewish football (association; soccer) players
