= Shahar Piven =

Russian footballer (born 1995)

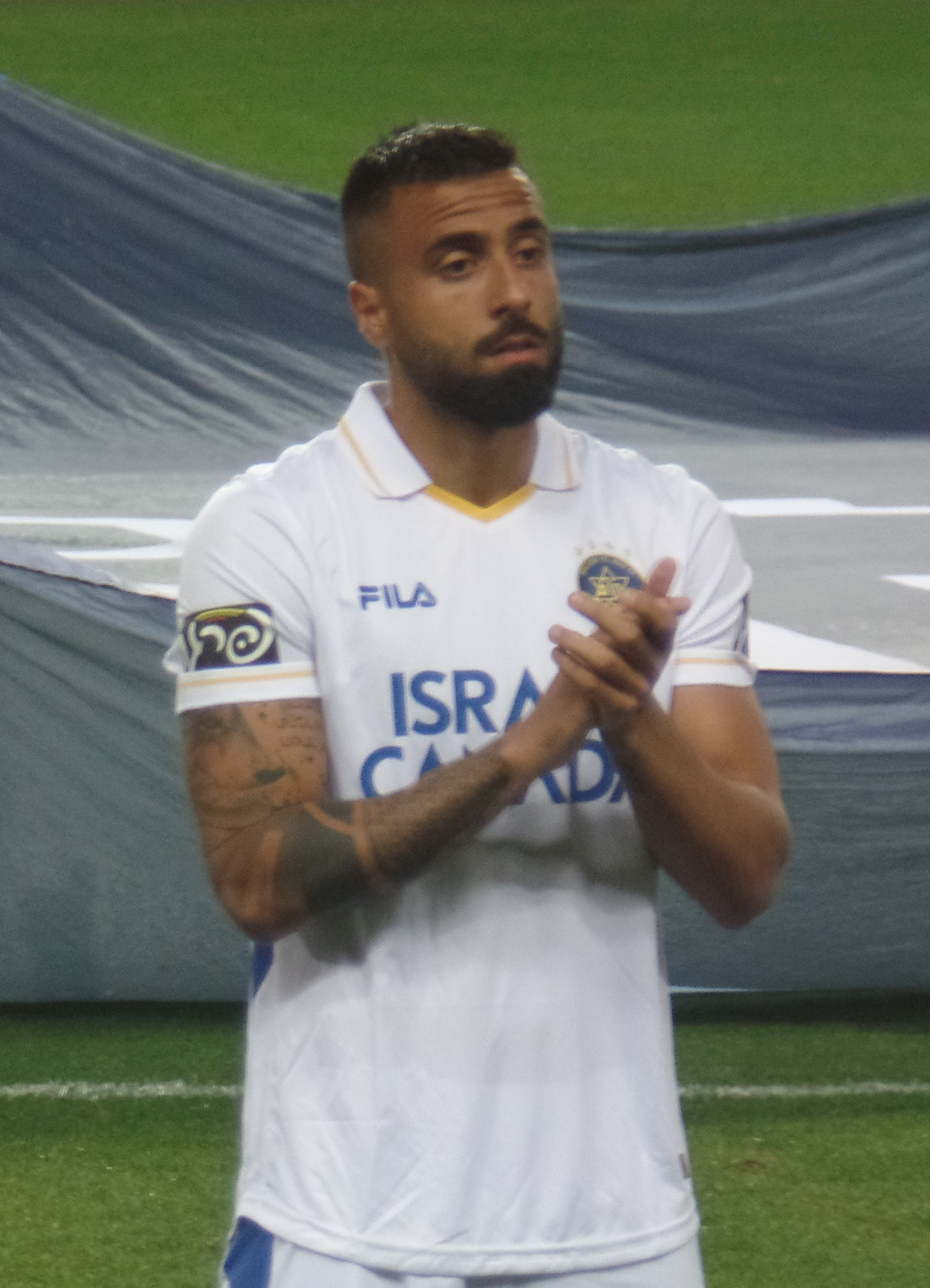
- Piven-Bachtiar playing for Maccabi Tel Aviv in 2022

Personal information
- Full name: Shahar Piven-Bachtiar
- Date of birth: 21 September 1995 (age 31)
- Place of birth: Birobidzhan, Russia
- Position: Centre-back

Team information
- Current team: Hapoel Tel Aviv
- Number: 21

Youth career
- Maccabi Tel Aviv

Senior career*
Years	Team	Apps	(Gls)
2015–2023	Maccabi Tel Aviv	85	(1)
2015–2018	→ Beitar Tel Aviv Bat Yam (loan)	66	(0)
2018	→ F.C. Ashdod (loan)	14	(0)
2023–2025	Hapoel Jerusalem	31	(0)
2025–	Hapoel Tel Aviv	41	(0)
- * Club domestic league appearances and goals as of 23 June 2026

Shahar Piven-Bachtiar (Hebrew: שחר פיבן, Russian: Шахар Пивень; born 21 September 1995) is an Israeli footballer who plays as a defender for Hapoel Tel Aviv.

== Early life ==
Piven-Bachtiar was born in Birobidzhan, Russia. He immigrated to with his mother to Israel as a six year old and grew up in Rishon LeZion, Israel.

== Career ==
Piven started his senior career with Maccabi Tel Aviv. After that, he played for Beitar Tel Aviv Bat Yam. In 2018, he signed for Ashdod in the Israeli Premier League, where he made sixteen appearances and scored zero goals.

== International career ==
He was called up again for the senior Israel national team on 14 November 2021, during their 2022 FIFA World Cup qualifiers - UEFA.

== Honours ==
=== Club ===
Maccabi Tel Aviv

- Israeli Premier League (2): 2018–19, 2019–20
- Toto Cup (2): 2018–19, 2020–21
- Israel Super Cup (2): 2019, 2020
