= Daniel Tenenbaum =

Brazilian footballer (born 1995)

Personal information
- Full name: Daniel Miller Tenenbaum
- Date of birth: 19 April 1995 (age 31)
- Place of birth: Rio de Janeiro, Brazil
- Height: 1.93 m (6 ft 4 in)
- Position: Goalkeeper

Team information
- Current team: Ironi Kiryat Shmona
- Number: 19

Youth career
- 2011–2015: Flamengo

Senior career*
| Years | Team | Apps | (Gls) |
| 2014–2017 | Flamengo | 2 | (0) |
| 2016–2017 | → Maccabi Tel Aviv (loan) | 0 | (0) |
| 2017–2024 | Maccabi Tel Aviv | 75 | (0) |
| 2024–2025 | Ironi Tiberias | 33 | (0) |
| 2025– | Ironi Kiryat Shmona | 31 | (0) |
- * Club domestic league appearances and goals as of 24 June 2026

Daniel Miller Tenenbaum (or Tennenbaum, born 19 April 1995) is a Brazilian professional footballer who plays for Ironi Kiryat Shmona as a goalkeeper.

== Early life ==
Tenenbaum was born in Rio de Janeiro, Brazil, to a family of Ashkenazi Jewish descent. He had his Bar Mitzvah in Israel. He served as a soldier in the Israel Defense Forces.

== Career ==
Born in Rio de Janeiro, Tenenbaum joined Flamengo's youth setup in 2011, aged 15, after already playing futsal and rowing for the club. He was promoted to the main squad in 2014 by manager Vanderlei Luxemburgo.

On 7 December 2014, Tenenbaum made his first team – and Série A – debut on 7 December 2014, coming on as a second-half substitute for field player Arthur in a 1–1 away draw against Grêmio as goalkeeper César was sent off.

On 31 August 2016, Tenenbaum was loaned to Israeli club Maccabi Tel Aviv.

After setting an Israeli Premier League clean sheet record of 14 consecutive clean-sheets, Tenenbaum conceded a goal in the ninth minute of the 1–1 draw with Nes Ziona, the first goal he conceded in the 2019 Israeli Premier League season. This goal ended a 1,273 minutes run without conceding a goal, being this, the seventh best clean-sheet run in top-flight football worldwide.

== Honours ==
Maccabi Tel Aviv

- Israeli Premier League: 2018–19, 2019–20
- Toto Cup: 2017–18, 2018–19, 2020–21
- Israel Super Cup: 2019, 2020

== See also ==
- List of Jewish footballers
- List of Jews in sports
- List of Israelis
