= Eylon Almog =

Israeli association footballer

Personal information
- Full name: Eylon Haim Almog
- Date of birth: 8 January 1999 (age 27)
- Place of birth: Ness Ziona, Israel
- Height: 1.81 m (5 ft 11 1/2 in)
- Position: Forward

Team information
- Current team: Hapoel Be'er Sheva
- Number: 29

Youth career
- 2008–2009: Sektzia Ness Ziona
- 2009–2012: Hapoel Tel Aviv
- 2012–2018: Maccabi Tel Aviv

Senior career*
Years	Team	Apps	(Gls)
2017–2023	Maccabi Tel Aviv	75	(9)
2018–2019	→ Beitar Tel Aviv Ramla	19	(6)
2019	→ Hapoel Hadera	16	(2)
2022–2023	→ TSV Hartberg	9	(1)
2023–	Hapoel Be'er Sheva	19	(1)
2025	→ Hapoel Jerusalem	14	(5)
2026	→ Ashdod	8	(1)

International career^{‡}
2015	Israel U16	4	(3)
2015–2016	Israel U17	17	(8)
2016	Israel U18	3	(1)
2016–2017	Israel U19	20	(8)
2018–2021	Israel U21	13	(3)
- * Club domestic league appearances and goals as of 24 June 2026 ‡ National team caps and goals as of 04:42, 8 February 2026 (UTC)

Eylon Haim Almog (or Eilon, Hebrew: אילון אלמוג; born 8 January 1999) is an Israeli professional footballer who plays as a forward for Israeli Premier League club Hapoel Be'er Sheva.

== Early life ==
Almog was born and raised in Ness Ziona, Israel, to a Jewish family.

== Club career ==
Almog started his senior career with Israeli Premier League club Maccabi Tel Aviv. After that, he played for Israeli side Beitar Tel Aviv Bat Yam. In 2019, he signed for Hapoel Hadera in the Israeli Premier League, where he made nineteen appearances and scored four goals.

== Honours ==
=== Club ===
Maccabi Tel Aviv

- Israeli Premier League (1): 2019-20
- Toto Cup (1): 2020-21
- Israel Super Cup (2): 2019, 2020

Hapoel Beer Sheva

- Israel Super Cup: 2025

== See also ==
- List of Jewish footballers
- List of Jews in sports
- List of Israelis
