= Matan Baltaxa =

Israeli footballer

Personal information
- Date of birth: 20 September 1995 (age 31)
- Place of birth: Shoham, Israel
- Height: 1.85 m (6 ft 1 in)
- Position: Centre-back

Team information
- Current team: Hapoel Be'er Sheva
- Number: 3

Youth career
- 2004–2006: Maccabi Tel Aviv
- 2006–2009: Maccabi Shoham
- 2009–2014: Hapoel Petah Tikva

Senior career*
Years	Team	Apps	(Gls)
2013–2017	Hapoel Petah Tikva	66	(7)
2017–2022	Maccabi Tel Aviv	30	(2)
2018	→ Hapoel Acre (loan)	16	(0)
2018–2020	→ Bnei Yehuda (loan)	66	(3)
2022–2024	Austria Wien	14	(1)
2024	Maccabi Tel Aviv	13	(0)
2024–	Hapoel Be'er Sheva	49	(4)

International career^{‡}
2021–	Israel	5	(0)
- * Club domestic league appearances and goals as of 23:37, 26 October 2026 (UTC) ‡ National team caps and goals as of 18:05, 24 October 2026 (UTC)

Matan Baltaxa (or Baltaksa, Hebrew: מתן בלטקסה; born 20 September 1995) is an Israeli professional footballer who plays as a centre-back for Israeli Premier League club Hapoel Be'er Sheva and the Israel national team.

== Early life ==
Baltaxa was born in Shoham, Israel, to a Jewish family. He served as a soldier in the Israel Defense Forces.

== International career ==
He made his debut for Israel national football team on 9 June 2021 in a friendly against Portugal.

== Honours ==
Bnei Yehuda

- Israel State Cup: 2016–17

Maccabi Tel Aviv

- Toto Cup: 2020-21
- Israel Super Cup: 2019, 2020

Hapoel Beer Sheva

- Israeli Premier League: 2025–26
- Israel State Cup: 2024–25
- Israel Super Cup: 2025
