= 2020–21 Toto Cup Al =

Tournament details
- Country: Israel
- Teams: 14

Final positions
- Champions: Maccabi Tel Aviv (7th title)
- Runners-up: Bnei Sakhnin

Tournament statistics
- Matches played: 27
- Goals scored: 56 (2.07 per match)

The 2020–21 Toto Cup Al was the 36th season of the third-important football tournament in Israel since its introduction and the 15th tournament involving Israeli Premier League clubs only.

Beitar Jerusalem were the defending champions.

== Format changes ==
The two clubs playing in the Israel Super Cup (Maccabi Tel Aviv and Hapoel Be'er Sheva) will not take part in the group stage, while the remaining twelve clubs were divided into three groups of four clubs. At the end of the group stage the team with the best results of the group winners will qualify to the Finals. Maccabi Tel Aviv and Hapoel Be'er Sheva will play (in the 2020 Israel Super Cup match) for a place in the finals. All the clubs will participate in classification play-offs.

== Group stage ==
Groups were allocated according to geographic distribution of the clubs, with the northern clubs allocated to Group A, and the center clubs allocated to Group B and group C. Each club will play the other clubs once.

The matches are scheduled to start in August 2020.

=== Group A ===
Pos	Team	Pld	W	D	L	GF	GA	GD	Pts	Qualification or relegation	BSK	MHA	IKS	HHA
1	Bnei Sakhnin	3	2	1	0	4	1	+3	7	Possible Final based on other 1st places	—	1–0		
2	Maccabi Haifa	3	2	0	1	2	1	+1	6	Possible 5–6th match based on other 2nd places		—		1–0
3	Ironi Kiryat Shmona	3	0	2	1	3	4	−1	2	Possible 9–10th match based on other 3rd places	1–1	0–1	—	
4	Hapoel Haifa	3	0	1	2	2	5	−3	1	Possible 11–12th match based on other 4th places	0–2		2–2	—

Updated to match(es) played on unknown. Source: Israel Football Association
Rules for classification: 1) points; 2) goal difference; 3) goals for;

=== Group B ===
Pos	Team	Pld	W	D	L	GF	GA	GD	Pts	Qualification or relegation	MNE	HKS	MPT	HHD
1	Maccabi Netanya	3	2	0	1	4	1	+3	6	Possible Final based on other 1st places	—	3–0	0–1	
2	Hapoel Kfar Saba	3	1	1	1	5	5	0	4	Possible 5–6th match based on other 2nd places		—		1–1
3	Maccabi Petah Tikva	3	1	1	1	3	5	−2	4	Possible 9–10th match based on other 3rd places		1–4	—	1–1
4	Hapoel Hadera	3	0	2	1	2	3	−1	2	Possible 11–12th match based on other 4th places	0–1			—

Updated to match(es) played on unknown. Source: Israel Football Association
Rules for classification: 1) points; 2) goal difference; 3) goals for;

=== Group C ===
Pos	Team	Pld	W	D	L	GF	GA	GD	Pts	Qualification or relegation	BEI	BYT	HTA	ASH
1	Beitar Jerusalem	3	1	2	0	2	0	+2	5	Possible Final based on other 1st places	—		0–0	
2	Bnei Yehuda	3	1	1	1	4	5	−1	4	Possible 5–6th match based on other 2nd places	0–0	—		1–5
3	Hapoel Tel Aviv	3	1	1	1	1	3	−2	4	Possible 9–10th match based on other 3rd places		0–3	—	
4	F.C. Ashdod	3	1	0	2	5	4	+1	3	Possible 11–12th match based on other 4th places	2–0		0–1	—

Updated to match(es) played on unknown. Source: Israel Football Association
Rules for classification: 1) points; 2) goal difference; 3) goals for;

=== Ranking of first-placed teams ===
Pos	Team	Pld	W	D	L	GF	GA	GD	Pts	Qualification or relegation
1	Bnei Sakhnin	3	2	1	0	4	1	+3	7	Qualified to the Final
2	Maccabi Netanya	3	2	0	1	4	1	+3	6	Qualified to 3–4 classification match
3	Beitar Jerusalem	3	1	2	0	2	0	+2	5	Qualified to 3–4 classification match

Updated to match(es) played on unknown. Source: Israel Football Association
Rules for classification: 1) points; 2) 2019–20 Israeli Premier League;

=== Ranking of second-placed teams ===
Pos	Team	Pld	W	D	L	GF	GA	GD	Pts	Qualification or relegation
1	Maccabi Haifa	3	2	0	1	2	1	+1	6	Qualified to 5–6 classification match
2	Bnei Yehuda	3	1	1	1	4	5	−1	4	Qualified to 7–8 classification match
3	Hapoel Kfar Saba	3	1	1	1	5	5	0	4	Qualified to 7–8 classification match

Updated to match(es) played on unknown. Source: Israel Football Association
Rules for classification: 1) points; 2) 2019–20 Israeli Premier League;

=== Ranking of third-placed teams ===
Pos	Team	Pld	W	D	L	GF	GA	GD	Pts	Qualification or relegation
1	Hapoel Tel Aviv	3	1	1	1	1	3	−2	4	Qualified to 9–10 classification match
2	Maccabi Petah Tikva	3	1	1	1	3	5	−2	4	Qualified to 9–10 classification match
3	Ironi Kiryat Shmona	3	0	2	1	3	4	−1	2	Qualified to 11–12 classification match

Updated to match(es) played on unknown. Source: Israel Football Association
Rules for classification: 1) points; 2) 2019–20 Israeli Premier League;

=== Ranking of fourth-placed teams ===
Pos	Team	Pld	W	D	L	GF	GA	GD	Pts	Qualification or relegation
1	F.C. Ashdod	3	1	0	2	5	4	+1	3	Qualified to 11–12 classification match
2	Hapoel Hadera	3	0	2	1	2	3	−1	2	Qualified to 13–14 classification match
3	Hapoel Haifa	3	0	1	2	2	5	−3	1	Qualified to 13–14 classification match

Updated to match(es) played on unknown. Source: Israel Football Association
Rules for classification: 1) points; 2) 2019–20 Israeli Premier League;

== Israel Super Cup ==
8 August 2020
20:15

Hapoel Be'er Sheva	0–2	Maccabi Tel Aviv
	Report	Nick Blackman 8', 33'

Teddy Stadium, Jerusalem
Attendance: 0
13 August 2020
20:30

Maccabi Tel Aviv	2–0	Hapoel Be'er Sheva
Yonatan Cohen 13'; Eylon Almog 44'	Report

Bloomfield Stadium, Tel Aviv
Attendance: 0

== Classification play-offs ==
=== 13–14th classification match ===
23 August 2020	Hapoel Hadera	4–2	Hapoel Haifa	Netanya
20:00	Odah 27', 43'; Gozlan 90+3'; Mesika 90+8'	Report	Agada 55'; Arel 90+6'	Stadium: Netanya Stadium; Attendance: 0

=== 11–12th classification match ===
23 August 2020	Ironi Kiryat Shmona	2–0	F.C. Ashdod	Kiryat Shmona
19:30	Lúcio 6'; Ben Lulu 61'	Report		Stadium: Municipal Stadium; Attendance: 0

=== 9–10th classification match ===
24 August 2020	Hapoel Tel Aviv	0–0 (1–4 p)	Maccabi Petah Tikva	Tel Aviv
20:30		Report		Stadium: Bloomfield Stadium; Attendance: 0
	Penalties
	Shlomo (penalty missed); Gruper (penalty scored); Hirsh (penalty missed)		Hindy (penalty scored); Hadida (penalty scored); Diniz (penalty scored); Eliyahu (penalty scored)

=== 7–8th classification match ===
23 August 2020	Bnei Yehuda	2–1	Hapoel Kfar Saba	Tel Aviv
19:30	Lazmi 65'; Zenati 86'	Report	Kizito 40'	Stadium: Bloomfield Stadium; Attendance: 0

=== 5–6th classification match ===
22 August 2020	Hapoel Be'er Sheva	1–0	Maccabi Haifa	Jerusalem
19:00	Sallalich 58'	Report		Stadium: Teddy Stadium; Attendance: 0

=== 3–4th classification match ===
22 August 2020	Beitar Jerusalem	1–0	Maccabi Netanya	Netanya
21:00	Edri 78'	Report		Stadium: Netanya Stadium; Attendance: 0

== Final ==
22 August 2020
20:30

Bnei Sakhnin	0–2	Maccabi Tel Aviv
	Report	Baltaxa 67'; Biton 90+2'

Doha Stadium, Sakhnin
Attendance: 0
Referee: Idan Leiba

== Final rankings ==
R	Team
1	Maccabi Tel Aviv
2	Bnei Sakhnin
3	Beitar Jerusalem
4	Maccabi Netanya
5	Hapoel Be'er Sheva
6	Maccabi Haifa
7	Bnei Yehuda
8	Hapoel Kfar Saba
9	Maccabi Petah Tikva
10	Hapoel Tel Aviv
11	Ironi Kiryat Shmona
12	F.C. Ashdod
13	Hapoel Hadera
14	Hapoel Haifa
