= 2020 Israel Super Cup =

- Event: Israel Super Cup
Hapoel Be'er Sheva	Maccabi Tel Aviv
Israel State Cup	Israeli Premier League
0	4
- on aggregate

First leg
Hapoel Be'er Sheva	Maccabi Tel Aviv
0	2
- Date: 8 August 2020
- Venue: Teddy Stadium, Jerusalem
- Referee: Daniel Bar Natan
- Attendance: 0

Second leg
Maccabi Tel Aviv	Hapoel Be'er Sheva
2	0
- Date: 13 August 2020
- Venue: Bloomfield Stadium, Tel Aviv
- Referee: Gal leibowitz
- Attendance: 0

The 2020 Israel Super Cup is the 25th Israel Super Cup (30th, including unofficial matches, as the competition wasn't played within the Israel Football Association in its first 5 editions until 1969), an annual Israel football match played between the winners of the previous season's Top Division and Israel State Cup. This is the fifth time since 1990 that the match was staged after a planned resumption of the cup was canceled in 2014.

The games were played between Maccabi Tel Aviv, champions of the 2019–20 Israeli Premier League and Hapoel Be'er Sheva, winners of the 2019–20 Israeli State Cup.

== Match details ==
=== First leg ===
8 August 2020
20:45

Hapoel Be'er Sheva	0–2	Maccabi Tel Aviv
	Report	Nick Blackman 7', 32'

Teddy Stadium, Jerusalem
Attendance: 0
Referee: Daniel Bar Natan

Hapoel Be'er Sheva	Maccabi Tel Aviv

GK	21	(Israel) Ohad Levita
RB	30	(Israel) Or Dadia
CB	20	(Israel) Loai Taha
CB	5	(Israel) Shir Tzedek (c)
CB	26	(Israel) Amit Bitton (substituted off) 46'
LB	29	(Israel) Sean Goldberg
LM	55	(Israel) Naor Sabag (yellow card) 13' (substituted off) 46'
CM	8	(Israel) Marwan Kabha (yellow card) 16' (substituted off) 46'
RM	11	(Israel) Ramzi Safouri (substituted off) 61'
FW	12	(Israel) Qais Ganem (substituted off) 77'
FW		(Israel) Itamar Shviro (yellow card) 50' (yellow-red card) 55'
Substitutes:
GK	69	(Israel) Raz Rahamim
DF	2	(Israel) Regev Aloper
DF	14	(Israel) Dudi Twito
DF	22	(Israel) Noam Gamon
MF	3	(Israel) David Keltjens (substituted on) 46'
MF	19	(Israel) Netanel Askias (substituted on) 61'
FW	17	(Israel) Ilay Madmon (substituted on) 46'
MF	15	(Israel) Tomer Yosefi (substituted on) 46'
FW	23	(Israel) Gal Levi (substituted on) 77'
Manager:
(Israel) Yossi Abuksis

GK	19	(Israel) Daniel Miller Tenenbaum
RB	30	(Israel) Maor Kandil (substituted on) 70'
CB	3	(Israel) Matan Baltaxa
CB	18	(Israel) Eitan Tibi
LB	27	(Israel) Ofir Davidzada (yellow card) 48'
DM	6	(Israel) Dan Glazer
CM	22	(Israel) Avi Rikan (substituted off) 58'
LM	42	(Israel) Dor Peretz (c) (substituted off) 80'
RW	39	(Panama) Eduardo Guerrero (substituted off) 58'
CF	29	(Israel) Eylon Almog
LF	9	(Barbados) Nick Blackman 7', 32' (substituted off) 80'
Substitutes:
GK	41	(Israel) Daniel Peretz
DF	27	(Israel) Ben Bitton
DF	25	(Israel) Amit Glazer (substituted on) 70'
MF	36	(Israel) Ido Shachar (substituted on) 58'
MF	34	(Israel) Bar Cohen (substituted on) 80'
MF	47	(Israel) Eden Karzev (substituted on) 80'
MF	24	(Israel) Yonatan Cohen (substituted on) 58'
FW	32	(Israel) Dor Turjeman
FW	32	(Israel) Ronen Hanzis
Manager:
(Netherlands) Patrick van Leeuwen

Man of the Match:

MATCH OFFICIALS
Assistant referees:
David Biton
Eli Kaspo
Fourth official:
Erez Papir
Video assistant referee:
Orel Grinfeld
Assistant video assistant referee:
Adi Tom

Match rules

- 90 minutes.
- Ten named substitutes, of which up to five may be used.

=== Second leg ===
13 August 2020
20:30

Maccabi Tel Aviv	2–0	Hapoel Be'er Sheva
Yonatan Cohen 13'; Eylon Almog 44'	Report

Bloomfield Stadium, Tel Aviv
Attendance: 0
Referee: Gal Leibowitz

Maccabi Tel Aviv	Hapoel Be'er Sheva

GK	19	(Israel) Daniel Miller Tenenbaum
RB	2	(Israel) Ben Bitton
CB	3	(Israel) Matan Baltaxa
CB	18	(Israel) Eitan Tibi
LB	27	(Israel) Ofir Davidzada (substituted off) 46'
DM	6	(Israel) Dan Glazer (substituted off) 56'
CM	47	(Israel) Eden Karzev
LM	42	(Israel) Dor Peretz (c) (substituted off) 56'
RW	24	(Israel) Yonatan Cohen 13'
CF	29	(Israel) Eylon Almog 44' (substituted off) 69'
LF	9	(Barbados) Nick Blackman (substituted off) 64'
Substitutes:
GK	41	(Israel) Daniel Peretz
DF	25	(Israel) Amit Glazer
DF	30	(Israel) Maor Kandil (substituted on) 46'
MF	36	(Israel) Ido Shachar
MF	34	(Israel) Bar Cohen
MF	22	(Israel) Avi Rikan (substituted on) 80'
FW	11	(Israel) Tal Ben Haim (substituted on) 69'
FW	39	(Panama) Eduardo Guerrero (substituted on) 56'
FW	32	(Israel) Ronen Hanzis (substituted on) 64'
Manager:
(Netherlands) Patrick van Leeuwen

GK	21	(Israel) Ohad Levita
RB	30	(Israel) Or Dadia (substituted off) 69'
CB	5	(Israel) Shir Tzedek (c)
CB	26	(Israel) Amit Bitton
LB	29	(Israel) Sean Goldberg
RM	55	(Israel) Naor Sabag (substituted off) 64'
CM	20	(Israel) David Keltjens
LM	17	(Israel) Ilay Madmon (substituted off) 56'
RF	15	(Israel) Tomer Yosefi (yellow card) 62'
FW	12	(Israel) Qais Ganem (substituted off) 69'
LW	77	(Israel) Rotem Hatuel (substituted off) 56'
Substitutes:
GK	69	(Israel) Raz Rahamim
DF	14	(Israel) Dudi Twito (substituted on) 56'
DF	18	(Israel) Eitan Razon
DF	22	(Israel) Noam Gamon (substituted on) 69' (yellow card) 81'
DF	92	(Israel) Abdallah Abu abaid (substituted on) 69'
MF	19	(Israel) Netanel Askias
MF	16	(Israel) Sintayehu Sallalich (substituted on) 56'
FW	23	(Israel) Gal Levi (substituted on) 64'
Manager:
(Israel) Yossi Abuksis

Man of the Match:

MATCH OFFICIALS
Assistant referees:
Dvir Shimon
Roi Hassan
Fourth official:
Idan Leiba
Video assistant referee:
Liran Liani
Assistant video assistant referee:
Idan Yarkoni

Match rules

- 90 minutes.
- Penalty shoot-out if scores level.
- Seven named substitutes, of which up to three may be used.

2020 Israel Super Cup champions

Maccabi Tel Aviv
7th title
