= 2019–20 Maccabi Tel Aviv F.C. season =

Maccabi Tel Aviv
2019–20 season
- Chairman: Mitchell Goldhar
- Manager: Vladimir Ivic
- Stadium: Bloomfield Stadium, Tel Aviv
- Premier League: 1st
- State Cup: Eighth round
- Toto Cup: Runners-up
- Super Cup: Winners
- UEFA Champions League: Second qualifying round
- Top goalscorer: League: Yonatan Cohen (12); All: Yonatan Cohen (13)
Home colours	Away colours	Third colours

The 2019–20 season was Maccabi Tel Aviv's 113th season since its establishment in 1906, and 72nd since the establishment of the State of Israel. During the 2019–20 campaign the club competed in the Israeli Premier League, the State Cup, the Toto Cup, and the UEFA Champions League.

== First team ==
No.	Pos.	Nation	Player
2	DF	ISR	Eli Dasa
3	DF	POR	Jair Amador
4	DF	ESP	Enric Saborit
6	MF	ISR	Dan Glazer
7	FW	ISR	Omer Atzili
10	FW	NGR	Chikeluba Ofoedu
11	FW	ISR	Itay Shechter
15	MF	ISR	Dor Micha
16	FW	ISR	Eliran Atar
18	DF	ISR	Eitan Tibi
19	GK	BRA	Daniel Tenenbaum
20	FW	ISR	Matan Hozez
21	MF	ISR	Sheran Yeini (Captain)

No.	Pos.	Nation	Player
22	MF	ISR	Avi Rikan
23	MF	ISR	Eyal Golasa
24	FW	ISR	Yonatan Cohen
25	FW	USA	Aaron Schoenfeld
27	DF	ISR	Ofir Davidzada
28	MF	ITA	Cristian Battocchio
30	DF	ISR	Maor Kandil
31	DF	ISR	Shachar Piven
41	GK	ISR	Daniel Peretz
42	MF	ISR	Dor Peretz
55	GK	ISR	Haviv Ohayon
77	MF	ISR	Ruslan Barsky
95	GK	SRB	Predrag Rajković

== Transfers ==
=== Summer ===
No.	Date	Pos.	Player	From	Fee	Source
17	1 July 2019	GK	Andreas Gianniotis	Olympiacos	Free transfer	
9	14 July 2019	FW	Nick Blackman	Derby County	Free transfer	
	31 July 2020	MF	Eden Karzev	Hapoel Hadera	Loan returns	
	2 July 2019	FW	Prince Okraku	Dreams	Undisclosed	
	30 June 2020	DF	Alon Shtrozberg	Beitar Tel Aviv Bat Yam	Loan returns	
	31 July 2020	DF	Amit Glazer	Beitar Tel Aviv Bat Yam	Loan returns	

=== Out ===
No.	Date	Pos.	Player	To	Fee	Source
	27 August 2019	MF	Tomas Prince	Hakoah Amidar	Undisclosed	
95	1 July 2019	GK	Predrag Rajković	Stade de Reims	₤4,500,000	
	1 August 2019	GK	Sahar Hasson	Ramat haSharon	Undisclosed	
	9 January 2020	FW	Prince Okraku	Dreams	Free Transfer	
2	1 July 2019	DF	Eli Dasa	Free Agent	–	
–	9 September 2019	DF	Eli Dasa	Vitesse	Undisclosed	
	1 July 2019	MF	Younes Jabarin	Hapoel Umm al-Fahm	Undisclosed	
	11 July 2019	MF	Or Dasa	Hapoel Ra'anana	€175,000	
	17 July 2019	MF	Eliel Peretz	Hapoel Hadera	€100,00	
	1 July 2019	FW	Sagiv Yehezkel	F.C. Ashdod	Free Transfer	

=== Loans in ===
No.	Pos.	Player	From	From date	Until	Fee	Source
28	RB	André Geraldes	Sporting CP	21 July 2019	31 July 2020	€150Th.	

=== Loans out ===
No.	Pos.	Player	Loan To	From date	Until	Fee	Source
	GK	Daniel Peretz	Beitar Tel Aviv Bat Yam	1 August 2019	31 July 2020	Loan	
	DF	Michael Chilaka	Beitar Tel Aviv Bat Yam	1 August 2019	31 July 2020	Loan	
	DF	Tomer Machluf	Beitar Tel Aviv Bat Yam	1 August 2019	31 July 2020	Loan	
	MF	Tamir Glazer	Beitar Tel Aviv Bat Yam	1 August 2019	31 July 2020	Loan	
	MF	Yoav Hofmeister	Beitar Tel Aviv Bat Yam	1 August 2019	31 July 2020	Loan	
	MF	Eyal Hen	Beitar Tel Aviv Bat Yam	1 August 2019	31 July 2020	Loan	
	MF	Omer Barami	Beitar Tel Aviv Bat Yam	1 August 2019	31 July 2020	Loan	
	MF	Ido Shahar	Beitar Tel Aviv Bat Yam	1 August 2019	31 July 2020	Loan	
	MF	Mofleh Shala'ata	Beitar Tel Aviv Bat Yam	1 August 2019	31 July 2020	Loan	
	MF	Bar Cohen	Beitar Tel Aviv Bat Yam	1 August 2019	31 July 2020	Loan	
	FW	Eduardo Guerrero	Beitar Tel Aviv Bat Yam	1 August 2019	31 July 2020	Loan	
	FW	Prince Okraku	Beitar Tel Aviv Bat Yam	1 August 2019	31 July 2020	Loan	
	FW	Amir Berkovich	Beitar Tel Aviv Bat Yam	1 August 2019	31 July 2020	Loan	

== Pre-season and friendlies ==
9 July 2019 Friendly	Saint-Gilloise (Belgium)	2-0	(Israel) Maccabi Tel Aviv	Forest, Brussels
19:00 CEST (UTC+2)	Bouekou 12'; Selemani 44'	Report		Stadium: Training camp Attendance: 150; Referee: Ron Van De Ven

11 July 2019 Friendly	Genk (Belgium)	4-1	(Israel) Maccabi Tel Aviv	Horst
19:00 CEST (UTC+2)	Dewaest 12'; Théo Bongonda 57'; Piotrowski 75'; Gano 90+1'	Report	Ofoedu 72' (pen.)	Stadium: Sportpark Sporting Swolgen Tienray; Attendance: 125

14 July 2019 Friendly	Sparta Rotterdam (Netherlands)	1-2	(Israel) Maccabi Tel Aviv	Mierlo
19:00 CEST (UTC+2)	Ache 21'	Report	Rikan 49'; Shechter 55'	Stadium: Sportpark De Ark; Attendance: 130

== UEFA Champions League ==
=== Second qualifying round ===
24 July 2019 First leg	CFR Cluj (Romania)	1-0	(Israel) Maccabi Tel Aviv	Cluj-Napoca, Romania
21:00 CEST (UTC+3)	Ormani 22'; Đoković (yellow card) 43'	Report	Kandil (yellow card) 80'	Stadium: CFR Stadium; Attendance: 11,150; Referee: José Sánchez (Spain)

30 July 2019 Second leg	Maccabi Tel Aviv (Israel)	2-2 (2–3 agg.)	(Romania) CFR Cluj	Netanya, Israel
20:00 IDT (UTC+3)	Blackman 15'; Đoković 48'; Atar (yellow card) 74'	Report	Deac (yellow card) 14'; Culio 19' (pen.); Rondón; Burcă	Stadium: Netanya Stadium; Attendance: 11,947; Referee: Marco Fritz (Germany)

== UEFA Europa League ==
=== Third qualifying round ===
8 August 2019 First leg	Maccabi Tel Aviv (Israel)	1-2	(Lithuania) Sūduva	Netanya, Israel
20:30 IDT (UTC+3)	Peretz (yellow card) 63'; Ofoedu 84'	Report	Kerla 37'; Cadjenovic (yellow card) 49'; Jankauskas 76'	Stadium: Netanya Stadium; Attendance: 8,512; Referee: Neil Doyle (Ireland)

15 August 2019 Second leg	Sūduva (Lithuania)	2-1 (4–2 agg.)	(Israel) Maccabi Tel Aviv	Marijampolė, Lithuania
20:00 EEST (UTC+3)	Topčagić 12'; Švrljuga 45'; Cadjenovic (yellow card) 73'	Report	Schechter 41'; Cohen (yellow card) 62' (yellow-red card) 90+4'; Blackman 86'	Stadium: Arvi Arena; Attendance: 5,337; Referee: Tore Hansen (Norway)

== Competition ==
=== Israeli Premier League ===
==== Regular season table ====
Pos	Team	Pld	W	D	L	GF	GA	GD	Pts	Qualification or relegation
1	Maccabi Tel Aviv	26	19	7	0	48	7	+41	64	Qualification for the Championship round
2	Maccabi Haifa	26	18	4	4	58	20	+38	58	Qualification for the Championship round
3	Beitar Jerusalem	26	15	4	7	42	25	+17	49	Qualification for the Championship round
4	Hapoel Be'er Sheva	26	13	5	8	33	23	+10	44	Qualification for the Championship round
5	Hapoel Tel Aviv	26	11	5	10	24	36	−12	38	Qualification for the Championship round

Updated to match(es) played on unknown. Source: Soccerway
Rules for classification: 1) Points; 2) Goal difference; 3) Matches won; 4) Goals scored; 5) Head-to-head points; 6) Head-to-head goal difference; 7) Head-to-head goals scored; 8) Play-off.

=== Regular season ===
24 August 2019 1	Sektzia Nes Tziona	0–2	Maccabi Tel Aviv	Petah Tikva
20:30 IDT (UTC+3)	Etou (yellow card) 33'	Report	Micha 22'; Atar 28'; Blackman (yellow card) 35'; Tibi (yellow card) 45+2'	Stadium: HaMoshava Stadium; Attendance: 5,654; Referee: Daniel Bar Natan

1 September 2019 2	Maccabi Tel Aviv	0–0	Bnei Yehuda Tel Aviv	Tel Aviv
20:00 IDT(UTC+3)	Glazer (yellow card) 28'; Peretz (yellow card) 42' (yellow-red card) 45'; Cohen (yellow card) 45+3'; Ofoedu (yellow card) 61'; Geraldes (yellow card) 87'	Report	Cohen (yellow card) 20'; Soro (yellow card) 74'; Tambi (yellow card) 90+1'	Stadium: Bloomfield Stadium; Attendance: 26,513; Referee: Roi Reinshreiber

14 September 2019 3	Hapoel Kfar Saba	0–1	Maccabi Tel Aviv	Petah Tikva
20:00 IDT(UTC+3)	Kuku (yellow card) 26'; Raynshtein (yellow card) 35' (yellow-red card) 87'; Gamoun (yellow card) 45'	Report	Micha 37'; Davidzada (yellow card) 58'	Stadium: HaMoshava Stadium; Attendance: 4,000; Referee: Ohad Asulin

21 September 2019 4	Maccabi Tel Aviv	1–0	Maccabi Haifa	Tel Aviv
20:30 IDT (UTC+3)	Sainsbury 37' (o.g.); Micha (yellow card) 45+3'; Piven (yellow card) 57'; Itay Shechter (yellow card) 84'; Ofoedu (yellow card) 86'	Report	Habshi (yellow card) 14'; Shua (yellow card) 45'; Plakuschenko 78'; Menahem (yellow card) 86'	Stadium: Bloomfield Stadium; Attendance: 26,234; Referee: Orel Grinfeld

28 September 2019 5	Beitar Jerusalem	0–4	Maccabi Tel Aviv	Jerusalem
20:30 IDT (UTC+3)	García (yellow card) 21'; Conte (yellow card) 52'; Kinda (yellow card) 54'; Konstantini (yellow card) 70'; Nitzan (yellow card) 76'; Grechkin (yellow card) 79'	Report	Ofoedu 45+1', 58'; Cohen 50'; Barsky (yellow card) 61', (goal) 63'; Barsky 63'; Tibi (yellow card) 71'; Cohen (yellow card) 76'; Glazer (yellow card) 85'	Stadium: Teddy Stadium; Attendance: 15,930; Referee: Liran Liany

5 October 2019 6	Maccabi Tel Aviv	0–0	Hapoel Hadera	Tel Aviv
18:00 IDT (UTC+3)	Nikolić (yellow card) 90'	Report	Hagay (yellow card) 14'; Maranhão (yellow card) 38'	Stadium: Bloomfield Stadium; Attendance: 24,829; Referee: Gal Leibovich

21 October 2019 7	Ashdod	0–1	Maccabi Tel Aviv	Ashdod
20:00 IDT (UTC+3)	Moshel (yellow card) 6'; Abu Akel (yellow card) 40'; Bardea (yellow card) 44'; Brihon (yellow card) 73'	Report	Saborit (yellow card) 73'; Glazer (yellow card) 84'; Shechter (yellow card) 89'	Stadium: Yud-Alef Stadium; Attendance: 5,090; Referee: Igal Frid

28 October 2019 8	Maccabi Tel Aviv	2–0	Hapoel Be'er Sheva	Tel Aviv
21:15 IDT (UTC+3)	Taha 45+4' (o.g.); Scechter 90+4'; Scechter (yellow card) 90+5'	Report	Vitor (yellow card) 9' (yellow-red card) 32'; Bitton (yellow card) 41'; Shamir (yellow card) 76'; Ben (yellow card) 90'	Stadium: Bloomfield Stadium; Attendance: 27,566; Referee: Ziv Adler

2 November 2019 9	Hapoel Ra'anana	0–2	Maccabi Tel Aviv	Petah Tikva
17:30 IST (UTC+2)	Dasa (yellow card) 33'; Cohen (yellow card) 62'; Mateos (yellow card) 74'; Levy (yellow card) 90+3'	Report	Ofoedu 10'; Cohen 74'	Stadium: HaMoshava Stadium; Attendance: 7,500; Referee: David Fuxman

9 November 2019 10	Maccabi Tel Aviv	3–0	Hapoel Haifa	Tel Aviv
19:50 IST (UTC+2)	Cohen 26'; Cohen (yellow card) 29'; Micha 55'; Saborit (yellow card) 87'; Schechter 90+3'	Report	Sardal (yellow card) 58'; Vahaba (yellow card) 71'; Kanuk (yellow card) 90+1'	Stadium: Bloomfield Stadium; Attendance: 23,125; Referee: Eli Hacmon

30 November 2019 11	Kiryat Shmona	0–1	Maccabi Tel Aviv	Kiryat Shmona
17:30 IST (UTC+2)	Ben-Shimon (yellow card) 5'; Diniz (yellow card) 26'; Karzev (yellow card) 33' (yellow-red card) 76'; Shaker (yellow card) 33'; Ryan (yellow card) 39'; Golan (red card) 90'	Report	Cohen 33' (pen.); Golasa 71'	Stadium: Kiryat Shmona Municipal Stadium; Attendance: 4,259; Referee: Daniel Bar Natan

4 December 2019 12	Hapoel Tel Aviv	0–3	Maccabi Tel Aviv	Tel Aviv
20:15 IST (UTC+2)	Spirovski (yellow card) 13'; Abaid (yellow card) 39'; Lax (yellow card) 45'; Dgani (yellow card) 88'	Report	Glazer (yellow card) 13'; Rikan 15'; Schoenfeld (yellow card) 63'; Shechter (yellow card) 80'; Rikan (yellow card) 87'; Cohen 88' (pen.); Almog 90+4'	Stadium: Bloomfield Stadium; Attendance: 22,000; Referee: Orel Grinfeld

7 December 2019 13	Maccabi Tel Aviv	0–0	Maccabi Netanya	Tel Aviv
19:50 IST (UTC+2)		Report		Stadium: Bloomfield Stadium; Attendance: 21,519

14 December 2019 14	Maccabi Tel Aviv	1–1	Sektzia Nes Tziona	Tel Aviv
15:00 IST (UTC+2)		Report		Stadium: Bloomfield Stadium; Attendance: 21,187

24 December 2019 15	Bnei Yehuda Tel Aviv	0–3	Maccabi Tel Aviv	Tel Aviv
20:15 IST (UTC+2)				Stadium: Bloomfield Stadium; Attendance: 5,750

28 December 2019 16	Maccabi Tel Aviv	4–0	Hapoel Kfar Saba	Tel Aviv
15:00 IST (UTC+2)				Stadium: Bloomfield Stadium; Attendance: 9,459

6 January 2020 17	Maccabi Haifa	3–4	Maccabi Tel Aviv	Haifa
15:00 IST (UTC+2)	Sallalich (yellow card) 56'; Rukavytsya 60'; Wildschut 62'; Awaed 87'		Rikan (yellow card) 5', (goal) 14'; Glazer (yellow card) 26'; Golasa 48'; Cohen (penalty missed) 69 69', 90+3', (yellow card) 90+3'; Tenenbaum (yellow card) 80'; Atzili (yellow card) 81'	Stadium: Sammy Ofer Stadium; Attendance: 30,071; Referee: Liran Liany

13 January 2020 18	Maccabi Tel Aviv	0–0	Beitar Jerusalem	Haifa
20:15 IST (UTC+2)				Stadium: Sammy Ofer Stadium; Attendance: 20,448

18 January 2020 19	Hapoel Hadera	0–3	Maccabi Tel Aviv	Netanya
19:50 IST (UTC+2)				Stadium: Netanya Stadium; Attendance: 4,536

25 January 2020 20	Maccabi Tel Aviv	2–0	Ashdod	Tel Aviv
19:50 IST (UTC+2)				Stadium: Bloomfield Stadium; Attendance: 15,942

29 January 2020 21	Hapoel Be'er Sheva	1–1	Maccabi Tel Aviv	Be'er Sheva
20:15 IST (UTC+2)				Stadium: Turner Stadium; Attendance: 10,346

3 February 2020 22	Maccabi Tel Aviv	2–1	Hapoel Ra'anana	Tel Aviv
20:15 IST (UTC+2)				Stadium: Bloomfield Stadium; Attendance: 15,462

8 February 2020 23	Hapoel Haifa	1–1	Maccabi Tel Aviv	Haifa
19:50 IST (UTC+2)	Altman (yellow card) 48'; Tapoko (yellow card) 56'; Mizrahi (yellow card) 62'; Zamir 90+3'	Report	Shechter 37'	Stadium: Sammy Ofer Stadium; Attendance: 4,443; Referee: Eli Hachmon

16 February 2020 24	Maccabi Tel Aviv	3–0	Kiryat Shmona	Tel Aviv
20:15 IST (UTC+2)				Stadium: Bloomfield Stadium; Attendance: 15,890

24 February 2020 25	Maccabi Tel Aviv	3–0	Hapoel Tel Aviv	Tel Aviv
20:15 IST (UTC+2)				Stadium: Bloomfield Stadium; Attendance: 26,301

29 February 2020 26	Maccabi Netanya	0–1	Maccabi Tel Aviv	Netanya
17:15 IST (UTC+2)				Stadium: Netanya Stadium; Attendance: 6,602

=== Championship ===
Pos	Team	Pld	W	D	L	GF	GA	GD	Pts	Qualification
1	Maccabi Tel Aviv (C)	36	26	9	1	63	10	+53	87	Qualification for the Champions League first qualifying round
2	Maccabi Haifa	36	22	7	7	73	32	+41	73	Qualification for the Europa League first qualifying round
3	Beitar Jerusalem	36	16	11	9	51	35	+16	59	Qualification for the Europa League first qualifying round
4	Hapoel Be'er Sheva (Note: Qualified due to winning the 2019–20 Israel State Cup)	36	15	10	11	44	33	+11	55	Qualification for the Europa League first qualifying round
5	Hapoel Tel Aviv	36	14	6	16	31	55	−24	48	Can't qualify for international competitions
6	Hapoel Haifa	36	12	11	13	39	46	−7	47	

Source: Israel Football Association, Soccerway
Rules for classification: 1) Points; 2) Goal difference; 3) Matches won; 4) Goals scored; 5) Head-to-head points; 6) Head-to-head goal difference; 7) Head-to-head goals scored; 8) Play-off.
(C) Champions
Notes:

30 May 2020 27	Maccabi Tel Aviv	2–0	Hapoel Haifa	Tel Aviv
20:00 IDT (UTC+3)	Hozez 45'; Shechter 55'	Report	Siroshtein (yellow card) 32'; Kapiloto (yellow card) 68'; Júnior (yellow card) 82'	Stadium: Bloomfield Stadium; Attendance: 0 Referee: Orel Grinfeld

3 June 2020 28	Maccabi Tel Aviv	2–0	Maccabi Haifa	Tel Aviv
20:45 IDT (UTC+3)	Eyal Golasa 18'; Shechter (yellow card) 55'; Hozez 86'; Atzili (yellow card) 88'		Plakuschenko (yellow card) 25'; Chery (yellow card) 32'; Lavi (yellow card) 49' (yellow-red card) 82'; Haziza (yellow card) 88'	Stadium: Bloomfield Stadium; Attendance: 0 Referee: Roi Reinshreiber

8 June 2020 29	Beitar Jerusalem	0–0	Maccabi Tel Aviv	Jerusalem
20:45 IDT (UTC+3)				Stadium: Teddy Stadium; Attendance: 0

15 June 2020 30	Maccabi Tel Aviv	1–1	Hapoel Be'er Sheva	Tel Aviv
20:45 IDT (UTC+3)				Stadium: Bloomfield Stadium; Attendance: 0

20 June 2020 31	Hapoel Tel Aviv	0–2	Maccabi Tel Aviv	Tel Aviv
21:00 IDT (UTC+3)				Stadium: Bloomfield Stadium; Attendance: 0

23 June 2020 32	Hapoel Haifa	0–3	Maccabi Tel Aviv	Haifa
20:50 IDT (UTC+3)	Burić (yellow card) 18'; Zamir (yellow card) 19'; Balilty (yellow card) 87'	Report	Piven 18'; Almog 44'; Davidzada (yellow card) 71'; Cohen 80' (pen.)	Stadium: Sammy Ofer Stadium; Attendance: 0 Referee: Liran Liani

27 June 2020 33	Maccabi Tel Aviv	3–0	Hapoel Tel Aviv	Tel Aviv
21:00 IDT (UTC+3)				Stadium: Bloomfield Stadium; Attendance: 0

1 July 2020 34	Maccabi Tel Aviv	1–0	Beitar Jerusalem	Tel Aviv
21:00 IDT (UTC+3)				Stadium: Bloomfield Stadium; Attendance: 0

4 July 2020 35	Maccabi Haifa	0–1	Maccabi Tel Aviv	Haifa
21:00 IDT (UTC+3)	Plakuschenko (yellow card) 24'; Sainsbury (yellow card) 36'		Saborit 24'; Eylon Almog (yellow card) 51'	Stadium: Sammy Ofer Stadium; Attendance: 0 Referee: Igal Frid

7 July 2020 36	Hapoel Be'er Sheva	2–0	Maccabi Tel Aviv	Ashdod
21:00 IDT (UTC+3)				Stadium: Yud-Alef Stadium; Attendance: 0

=== Super Cup ===
20 July 2019 Final	Bnei Yehuda Tel Aviv	0–1	Maccabi Tel Aviv	Petah Tikva
20:30 IDT (UTC+3)	Zenati (yellow card) 14'; Rustum (yellow card) 58'	Report	Schoenfeld (yellow card) 80'; Maor Kandil (yellow card) 88'	Stadium: HaMoshava Stadium; Attendance: 8,169; Referee: Eli Hacmon

=== State Cup ===
21 December 2019 Round of 16	Hapoel Umm al-Fahm	3–2	Maccabi Tel Aviv	Afula
19:50 IDT (UTC+3)	Kijanskas 42'; Piven 49' (o.g.); Mesika 78'	Report	Rikan 13'; Almog 32'	Stadium: Afula Illit Stadium; Attendance: 3,000; Referee: Liran Liani

=== Toto Cup ===
18 August 2019 Semi-finals	Kiryat Shmona	0–1	Maccabi Tel Aviv	Kiryat Shmona
19:00 IDT (UTC+3)		Report	Bartkus 49' (o.g.)	Stadium: Kiryat Shmona Municipal Stadium; Attendance: 4,259; Referee: Shalom Ben Avraham

24 September 2019 Final	Maccabi Tel Aviv	0–2	Beitar Jerusalem	Netanya
20:15 IDT (UTC+3)		Report	Varenne 87'; Magbo 90+3'	Stadium: Netanya Stadium; Attendance: 11; Referee: Ziv Adler
