= 2018–19 Maccabi Tel Aviv F.C. season =

Maccabi Tel Aviv
2018–19 season
- Chairman: Mitchell Goldhar
- Manager: Vladimir Ivic
- Stadium: Netanya Stadium (temporary)
- Premier League: 1st
- State Cup: Semi-finals
- Toto Cup: Winners
- UEFA Europa League: Play-off round
- Top goalscorer: League: Eliran Atar (10); All: Eliran Atar (17)
Home colours	Away colours

The 2018–19 season is Maccabi Tel Aviv's 112th season since its establishment in 1906, and 71st since the establishment of the State of Israel. During the 2018–19 campaignthe club have competed in the Israeli Premier League, State Cup, Toto Cup, UEFA Europa League.

== First team ==
No.	Pos.	Nation	Player
2	DF	ISR	Eli Dasa
3	DF	POR	Jair Amador
4	DF	ESP	Enric Saborit
6	MF	ISR	Dan Glazer
7	MF	ISR	Omer Atzili
10	FW	NGA	Chikeluba Ofoedu
11	FW	ISR	Itay Shechter
15	MF	ISR	Dor Micha
16	FW	ISR	Eliran Atar
18	DF	ISR	Eitan Tibi
19	GK	BRA	Daniel Tenenbaum
20	FW	ISR	Matan Hozez
21	MF	ISR	Sheran Yeini (Captain)

No.	Pos.	Nation	Player
22	MF	ISR	Avi Rikan
23	MF	ISR	Eyal Golasa
24	FW	ISR	Yonatan Cohen
25	FW	USA	Aaron Schoenfeld
27	DF	ISR	Ofir Davidzada
28	MF	ITA	Cristian Battocchio
30	DF	ISR	Maor Kandil
31	DF	ISR	Shachar Piven
41	GK	ISR	Daniel Peretz
42	MF	ISR	Dor Peretz
55	GK	ISR	Haviv Ohayon
77	MF	ISR	Ruslan Barsky
95	GK	SRB	Predrag Rajković

== Transfers ==
=== Summer ===
In:

No.	Pos.	Nation	Player
—	DF	POR	Jair (from (Spain) Huesca)
—	MF	ISR	Roslan Barsky (loan return from Hapoel Haifa)
—	MF	ISR	Yonatan Cohen (loan return from Bnei Yehuda)
—	FW	ISR	Itay Shechter (from Beitar Jerusalem)
—	FW	ISR	Matan Hozez (loan return from Bnei Yehuda)
—	FW	ISR	Mavis Tchibota (loan return from Bnei Yehuda)
—	DF	ESP	Enric Saborit (from (Spain) Athletic Bilbao)
—	FW	NGA	Chikeluba Ofoedu (from (Turkey) Eskişehirspor)
—	DF	ISR	Maor Kandil (from Bnei Yehuda)

Out:

No.	Pos.	Nation	Player
—	DF	ISR	Yuval Spungin (to Ironi Kiryat Shmona)
—	DF	MTQ	Jean-Sylvain Babin (loan return to (Spain) Sporting Gijón)
—	DF	ISR	Tal Ben Haim (Released)
—	MF	ESP	José Rodríguez (loan return to (Germany) Mainz 05)
—	FW	ISR	Barak Yitzhaki (Retired)
—	GK	ISR	Daniel Lifshitz (Retired)
—	DF	ISR	Ofir Davidzada (loan return to (Belgium) KAA Gent)
—	DF	ISR	Sagiv Yehezkel (on loan to Bnei Yehuda)
—	FW	ISR	Mavis Tchibota (to Bnei Yehuda)
—	FW	ISL	Vidar Orn Kjartansson (to (Russia) Rostov)

== Pre-season and friendlies ==
25 June 2018 Training Camp	Maccabi Tel Aviv (Israel)	1-1	(Poland) Arka Gdynia	Gdańsk, Poland
19:00	Atar 72'		Janota 29'

28 June 2018 Training Camp	Maccabi Tel Aviv (Israel)	1-2	(Cyprus) APOEL FC	Gdańsk, Poland
19:00	Micha 57'; Tchibota (yellow card) 67'		Ioannou 10'; Souza 88'

1 July 2018 Training Camp	Maccabi Tel Aviv (Israel)	4-0	(Poland) Bytovia Bytów
19:00	Kjartansson 21'; Shechter 24'; Rikan 53'; Golasa 54'

== UEFA Europa League ==
=== First qualifying round ===
12 July 2018 First leg	Ferencvárosi TC (Hungary)	1-1	(Israel) Maccabi Tel Aviv	Budapest, Hungary
20:00	Spirovski 61'; Finnbogason (yellow card) 67'; Böde (yellow card) 85'		Golasa (yellow card) 36'; Atar (yellow card) 90' (goal) 90'	Stadium: Groupama Arena

19 July 2018 Second leg	Maccabi Tel Aviv (Israel)	1-0	(Hungary) Ferencvárosi TC	Netanya, Israel
20:00	Rikan (yellow card) 33'; Atar 45'			Stadium: Netanya Stadium

=== Second qualifying round ===
26 July 2018 First leg	Maccabi Tel Aviv (Israel)	2-0	(Serbia) Radnički Niš	Netanya, Israel
20:00	Dasa (yellow card) 35'; Kjartansson 51', 69' (pen.); Atzili (yellow card) 77' (red card) 79'			Stadium: Netanya Stadium

2 August 2018 Second leg	Radnički Niš (Serbia)	2-2	(Israel) Maccabi Tel Aviv	Niš, Serbia
22:00	Stanisavljević 44', 58'		Pankov 33' (o.g.); Atar 38'; Jair (yellow card) 53'	Stadium: Čair Stadium

=== Third qualifying round ===
7 August 2018 First leg	FC Pyunik (Armenia)	0-0	(Israel) Maccabi Tel Aviv	Yerevan, Armenia
19:00	Trusevych (yellow card) 48'		Glazer (yellow card) 16'; Jair (yellow card) 55'	Stadium: Vazgen Sargsyan Republican Stadium

16 August 2018 Second leg	Maccabi Tel Aviv (Israel)	2-1	(Armenia) FC Pyunik	Netanya, Israel
20:30	Scechter (yellow card) 52'; Micha 55'; Atar 68'		Voynov 10'; Arakelyan (yellow card) 37'; Grigoryan (yellow card) 43'; Konaté (yellow card) 57'; Hovsepyan (yellow card) 77'	Stadium: Netanya Stadium

=== Playoff round ===
9 August 2018 First leg	Sarpsborg (Norway)	3-1	(Israel) Maccabi Tel Aviv	Sarpsborg, Norway
20:05	Heintz 1'; Nielsen 6' (pen.); Jørgensen (yellow card) 38'; Mortensen 56'		Tibi (yellow card) 5'; Kjartansson 13' (prn.)	Stadium: Sarpsborg Stadion

30 August 2018 Second leg	Maccabi Tel Aviv (Israel)	2-1	(Norway) Sarpsborg	Netanya, Israel
20:00	Atzili (yellow card) 30' (goal) 52' (pen.); Atar 60'		Muhammed (yellow card) 45'; Utvik (yellow card) 50'; Halvorsen 81' (yellow card) 81'; Askar (yellow card) 84'	Stadium: Netanya Stadium

== Israeli Premier League ==
=== Regular season ===
26 August 2018 1	Maccabi Tel Aviv	2-0	Maccabi Haifa	Netanya
21:00	Jair (yellow card) 26'; Rikan (yellow card) 39'; Shechter 66'; Dasa (yellow card) 74'; Peretz 76'		Dos Santos (yellow card) 13'; Lavi (yellow card) 38'; Kramer (red card) 67'; Awead (yellow card) 70'; Weissman (yellow card) 82'	Stadium: Netanya Stadium

2 September 2018 2	Hapoel Be'er Sheva	1-1	Maccabi Tel Aviv	Be'er Sheva
21:15	Ogu (yellow card) 23' (goal) 30'		Golasa 63'; Peretz (yellow card) 30'	Stadium: Turner Stadium

15 September 2018 3	Maccabi Tel Aviv	4-1	Hapoel Ra'anana	Netanya
18:00	Shechter 16'; Atar 63', 69'; Ofoedu 89'		Nimni (yellow card) 23'; Maimoni (yellow card) 51'; Yeini 80' (o.g.)	Stadium: Netanya Stadium

22 September 2018 4	Maccabi Netanya	1-2	Maccabi Tel Aviv	Netanya
20:30	Kahlon (yellow card) 7'; Tiram 49' (yellow card) 90'; Twito (yellow card) 71'		Davidzada (yellow card) 1'; Piven (yellow card) 27'; Shechter 29' (yellow card) 40'; Dasa 81'	Stadium: Netanya Stadium

1 October 2018 5	Maccabi Tel Aviv	0-0	Hapoel Tel Aviv	Netanya
21:00	Glazer (yellow card) 51'		Elias (yellow card) 21'; Abed (yellow card) 54'; Peersman (yellow card) 85'; Shlomo (yellow card) 88'	Stadium: Netanya Stadium

7 October 2018 6	Beitar Jerusalem	0-2	Maccabi Tel Aviv	Jerusalem
21:00	Siroshtein (yellow card) 33'; Ben Haim (yellow card) 44'; Inbrum (yellow card) 82'		Atzili 40', 88' (yellow card) 54'; Peretz (yellow card) 48'; Shechter (yellow card) 80'	Stadium: Teddy Stadium

20 October 2018 7	Maccabi Tel Aviv	4–0	Hapoel Hadera	Netanya
17:00	Ofoedu 7', 32'; Atzili (yellow card) 30'; Golasa 36'; Saborit 54'		Abu Zaid (yellow card) 8'; Mateos (yellow card) 57'; Tapoko (yellow card) 64'; Plumain (yellow card) 90'; Lúcio (yellow card) 90'	Stadium: Netanya Stadium

28 October 2018 8	Hapoel Haifa	1–3	Maccabi Tel Aviv	Haifa
20:30	Arel (yellow card) 22'; Vermouth (yellow card) 45'; Mitrevski 90+1'		Atzili 3'; Rikan (yellow card) 39' (goal) 45'; Peretz 79'	Stadium: Sammy Ofer Stadium

3 November 2018 9	Maccabi Tel Aviv	3–0	Bnei Sakhnin	Netanya
20:30	Kandil 36'; Yeini 51'; Atar 65'		Khateb (yellow card) 8'; Ganayem (yellow card) 20'; Ghadir (yellow card) 32'; Falah (yellow card) 50'; Ottman (yellow card) 53'; Gantous (yellow card) 88'	Stadium: Netanya Stadium

11 November 2018 10	Ironi Kiryat Shmona	1–2	Maccabi Tel Aviv	Kiryat Shmona
20:15	Abuhatzira 7'; Shaker (yellow card) 57'; Bartkus (yellow card) 90'		Atzili 38', 65' (pen.) (yellow card) 71'; Kandil (yellow card) 42'; Shechter (yellow card) 75'	Stadium: Kiryat Shmona Municipal Stadium

1 December 2018 11	Maccabi Petah Tikva	1–1	Maccabi Tel Aviv	Petah Tikva
21:00	Peretz 23'; Micha (yellow card) 78'		Sivok (yellow card) 89' (goal) 90+3'	Stadium: HaMoshava Stadium

4 December 2018 12	Maccabi Tel Aviv	4–0	F.C. Ashdod	Netanya
20:30	Rikan 26'; Atar 36', 58'; Schoenfeld 51'			Stadium: Netanya Stadium

8 December 2018 13	Bnei Yehuda Tel Aviv	1–3	Maccabi Tel Aviv	Petah Tikva
20:30	Mori (yellow card) 40'; Cuéllar (yellow card) 44'; Konstantini 57'; Tchibota (yellow card) 84'		Cohen 14', 68'; Shechter 17'	Stadium: HaMoshava Stadium

17 December 2018 14	Maacabi Haifa	1–3	Maccabi Tel Aviv	Haifa
21:00	Atar 4', 43'; Barsky (yellow card) 18'; Peretz 47'; Piven (yellow card) 55'		Mandjeck (yellow card) 14'; Azulay (yellow card) 35'; Sallalich (yellow card) 69'; Awaed (yellow card) 69'	Stadium: Sammy Ofer Stadium

25 December 2018 15	Maccabi Tel Aviv	3–0	Hapoel Be'er Sheva	Netanya
21:00	Ofoedu 21'; Jair (yellow card) 38'; Cohen (yellow card) 44'; Saborit 57'; Glazer (yellow card) 60'; Rikan 70'		Bitton (yellow card) 50'; Elhamed (yellow card) 69' (red card) 80'	Stadium: Netanya Stadium

29 December 2018 16	Hapoel Ra'anana	0–2	Maccabi Tel Aviv	Ramat Gan
16:00	Savir (yellow card) 20'; Levy (yellow card) 72'		Shechter 37'; Jair (yellow card) 52'; Peretz 73'	Stadium: Ramat Gan Stadium

7 January 2019 17	Maccabi Tel Aviv	4–1	Maccabi Netanya	Netanya
	Atzili 1', 61' (yellow card) 36'; Kandil (yellow card) 21'; Shechter (yellow card) 38'; Micha 45'; Rikan 82'; Piven (yellow card) 86'		Vrgoč (yellow card) 38'; Kahlon (yellow card) 61'; Twito (yellow card) 70'; Bećiraj (yellow card) 73'; Olsak 86'	Stadium: Netanya Stadium

14 January 2019 18	Hapoel Tel Aviv	1–1	Maccabi Tel Aviv	Petah Tikva
21:00	Gotlieb 58'; Agayev (yellow card) 81'; Boateng 88'; Safouri (yellow card) 88'; Dgani (yellow card) 90+3'		Ofoedu 32' (yellow card) 38'; Glazer (yellow card) 46'; Rikan (yellow card) 81'; Shechter (red card) 88'	Stadium: HaMoshava Stadium

21 January 2019 19	Maccabi Tel Aviv	1–0	Beitar Jerusalem	Netanya
14:00	Micha 62'	Report	Plumain (yellow card) 8'; Einbinder (yellow card) 67'; Zehavi (yellow card) 69'; Scheimann (yellow card) 86'	Stadium: Netanya Stadium

28 January 2019 20	Hapoel Hadera	0-2	Maccabi Tel Aviv	Netanya
21:00	Zalka (yellow card) 36'; Fochive (yellow card) 90'		Jair (yellow card) 17'; Shechter 18'; Atar 29' (yellow card) 36'; Glazer (yellow card) 51'	Stadium: Netanya Stadium

3 February 2019 21	Maccabi Tel Aviv	1-1	Hapoel Haifa	Netanya
20:30	Saborit 37'; Kandil (yellow card) 90'		Mitrevski (yellow card) 28'; Tamas 81'	Stadium: Netanya Stadium

11 February 2019 22	Bnei Sakhnin	0-0	Maccabi Tel Aviv	Sakhnin
20:30	Kandil (yellow card) 88'; Mbola (yellow card) 90'		Davidzada (yellow card) 71'	Stadium: Doha Stadium

16 February 2019 23	Maccabi Tel Aviv	3-0	Ironi Kiryat Shmona	Netanya
20:30	Atar 7', 62'; Atzili (yellow card) 30'; Micha 32'; Peretz (yellow card) 74'; Glazer (yellow card) 85'		Ryan (yellow card) 18'; Morcillo (yellow card) 33'; Abu Abaid (yellow card) 89'	Stadium: Netanya Stadium

23 February 2019 24	Maccabi Tel Aviv	2-0	Maccabi Petah Tikva	Netanya
16:00	Ofoedu (yellow card) 36'; Atar 76' (pen.); Micha 89'		Kanyuk (yellow card) 5'; Bambock (yellow card) 10' (yellow-red card) 45'; Danino (yellow card) 36'; Tako (yellow card) 75'; Sivok (yellow card) 86'	Stadium: Netanya Stadium

2 March 2019 25	Ashdod	0-2	Maccabi Tel Aviv	Ashdod
18:20	David (yellow card) 39'; Lingane (yellow card) 45'; Tzruya (yellow card) 79'		Atzili 60', 90+4'; Rikan (yellow card) 61'; Dasa (yellow card) 87'	Stadium: Yud-Alef Stadium

11 March 2019 26	Maccabi Tel Aviv	2–1	Bnei Yehuda Tel Aviv	Netanya
20:30	Rikan (yellow card) 29' (goal) 81'; Atar 62'; Saborit (yellow card) 64'; Barsky (yellow card) 90'; Dasa (yellow card) 90+5'		Soro (yellow card) 15' (yellow-red card) 90+3'; Sages 35'; Konstantini (yellow card) 59'; Tchibota (yellow card) 81'	Stadium: Netanya Stadium

==== Regular season table ====
Pos	Team	Pld	W	D	L	GF	GA	GD	Pts	Qualification or relegation
1	Maccabi Tel Aviv	26	20	6	0	57	12	+45	66	Qualification for the Championship round
2	Maccabi Haifa	26	12	8	6	34	27	+7	44	Qualification for the Championship round
3	Maccabi Netanya	26	12	7	7	34	29	+5	43	Qualification for the Championship round
4	Hapoel Be'er Sheva	26	10	9	7	36	32	+4	39	Qualification for the Championship round
5	Bnei Yehuda	26	10	7	9	39	25	+14	37	Qualification for the Championship round

Source: Soccerway
Rules for classification: 1) Points; 2) Goal difference; 3) Matches won; 4) Goals scored; 5) Head-to-head points; 6) Head-to-head goal difference; 7) Head-to-head goals scored; 8) Play-off.

=== Play-off ===
16 March 2019 27	Maccabi Tel Aviv	2-0	Hapoel Hadera	Netanya
16:00		Report		Stadium: Netanya Stadium; Attendance: 6,497

30 March 2019 28	Maccabi Tel Aviv	1-0	Maccabi Haifa	Netanya
21:00				Stadium: Netanya Stadium; Attendance: 12,280

7 April 2019 29	Maccabi Netanya	1-4	Maccabi Tel Aviv	Netanya
20:30		Report		Stadium: Netanya Stadium

15 April 2019 30	Maccabi Tel Aviv	0-0	Hapoel Be'er Sheva	Netanya
21:00		Report		Stadium: Netanya Stadium; Attendance: 9,353

23 April 2019 31	Bnei Yehuda Tel Aviv	0-2	Maccabi Tel Aviv	Petah Tikva
20:30		Report		Stadium: HaMoshava Stadium; Attendance: 5,000

27 April 2019 32	Hapoel Hadera	0-1	Maccabi Tel Aviv	Netanya
18:00		Report		Stadium: Netanya Stadium; Attendance: 2,500

5 May 2019 33	Maccabi Tel Aviv	2-3	Bnei Yehuda Tel Aviv	Netanya
20:30		Report		Stadium: Netanya Stadium; Attendance: 4,760

11 May 2019 34	Maccabi Tel Aviv	3-0	Maccabi Netanya	Netanya
18:00		Report		Stadium: Netanya Stadium; Attendance: 8,737

19 May 2019 35	Maccabi Haifa	1-1	Maccabi Tel Aviv	Haifa
20:30		Report		Stadium: Sammy Ofer Stadium; Attendance: 16,241

25 May 2019 36	Hapoel Be'er Sheva	0-4	Maccabi Tel Aviv	Be'er Sheva
20:00		Report		Stadium: Turner Stadium; Attendance: 14,040

==== Championship round table ====
Pos	Team	Pld	W	D	L	GF	GA	GD	Pts	Qualification
1	Maccabi Tel Aviv (C)	36	27	8	1	77	17	+60	89	Qualification for the Champions League second qualifying round
2	Maccabi Haifa	36	16	10	10	46	41	+5	58	Qualification for the Europa League first qualifying round
3	Hapoel Be'er Sheva	36	15	10	11	48	46	+2	55	Qualification for the Europa League first qualifying round
4	Maccabi Netanya	36	15	8	13	45	47	−2	53	
5	Bnei Yehuda Tel Aviv	36	14	9	13	56	41	+15	51	Qualification for the Europa League third qualifying round (Note: Bnei Yehuda Tel Aviv qualified for the Europa League third qualifying round by winning the 2018–19 Israel State Cup.)
6	Hapoel Hadera	36	12	6	18	43	59	−16	42	

Source: Israel Football Association, Soccerway
Rules for classification: 1) Points; 2) Goal difference; 3) Matches won; 4) Goals scored; 5) Head-to-head points; 6) Head-to-head goal difference; 7) Head-to-head goals scored; 8) Play-off.
(C) Champions

== State Cup ==
22 December 2018 Eighth Round	Beitar Jerusalem	1–2	Maccabi Tel Aviv	Jerusalem
21:00	Siroshtein (yellow card) 45'; Zahavi (yellow card) 64'; Varenne 81'; Raly (yellow card) 89'		Rajković (yellow card) 31'; Ohayon (red card) 40'; Yeini (yellow card) 42'; Atar 67'; Cohen 90+2'	Stadium: Teddy Stadium

17 January 2019 Round of 16	Maccabi Tel Aviv	4–0	Hapoel Acre	Netanya
19:00	Micha 12'; Cohen 32', 79'; Atar 43'		Khalaila (yellow card) 15'	Stadium: Netanya Stadium

6 February 2019 Quarter-final	Bnei Sakhnin	1–4	Maccabi Tel Aviv	Acre
21:00		Report		Stadium: Acre Municipal Stadium

26 February 2019 Quarter-final	Maccabi Tel Aviv	0–0	Bnei Sakhnin	Netanya
20:45		Report		Stadium: Netanya Stadium; Attendance: 1,320

3 April 2019 Semi-final	Bnei Yehuda Tel Aviv	1–0	Maccabi Tel Aviv	Jerusalem
20:45		Report		Stadium: Teddy Stadium

== Toto Cup ==
29 July 2018 UEFA qualifiers match	Maccabi Tel Aviv	1–0	Beitar Jerusalem	Netanya
21:00	Schoenfeld 57' [		Sabo (yellow card) 3'; Siroshtein (yellow card) 67'	Stadium: Netanya Stadium

19 August 2018 Semi Final	Maccabi Tel Aviv	4–1	Hapoel Tel Aviv	Netanya
21:00	Piven (yellow card) 6' (goal) 59'; Cohen 36' (66), pen.' Ofoedu 82'		Shlomo (yellow card) 5'; Abed 25'; Gotlieb (yellow card) 34'; Roger (yellow card) 69'	Stadium: Netanya Stadium

26 September 2018 Final	Maccabi Tel Aviv	2–1	Maccabi Haifa	Petah Tikva
20:45	Atzili 31'; Atar 85'		Menahem (yellow card) 35'; Awaesd 43'; Allyson (yellow card) 89'	Stadium: HaMoshava Stadium

== Squad statistics ==
As of match played 19 August 2018

=== Appearances and goals ===
No.	Pos	Nat	Player	Total		Premier League		State Cup		Toto Cup		UEFA Europa League	
No.	Pos	Nat	Player	Apps	Goals	Apps	Goals	Apps	Goals	Apps	Goals	Apps	Goals
2	DF	(Israel) ISR	Eli Dasa	16	1	10	1	0	0	1	0	5	0
3	DF	(Portugal) POR	Jair	14	0	7	0	0	0	1	0	6	0
4	DF	(Spain) ESP	Enric Saborit	19	1	12	1	0	0	1	0	6	0
6	MF	(Israel) ISR	Dan Glazer	16	0	10	0	0	0	2	0	4	0
7	FW	(Israel) ISR	Omer Atzili	18	5	12	5	0	0	1	0	5	0
10	FW	(Nigeria) NGA	Chikeluba Ofoedu	14	4	11	3	0	0	1	1	2	0
11	MF	(Israel) ISR	Itay Shechter	18	4	13	4	0	0	2	0	3	0
13	DF	(Israel) ISR	Sheran Yeini	19	1	13	1	0	0	2	0	4	0
15	MF	(Israel) ISR	Dor Micha	21	1	14	0	0	0	1	0	6	1
16	FW	(Israel) ISR	Eliran Atar	18	11	11	7	0	0	1	0	6	4
17	MF	(Israel) ISR	Matan Hozez	4	0	1	0	0	0	1	0	2	0
18	DF	(Israel) ISR	Eitan Tibi	8	0	1	0	0	0	1	0	6	0
19	GK	(Brazil) BRA	Daniel	0	0	0	0	0	0	0	0	0	0
22	DF	(Israel) ISR	Avi Rikan	17	2	13	2	0	0	1	0	3	0
23	MF	(Israel) ISR	Eyal Golasa	15	2	9	2	0	0	2	0	4	0
24	MF	(Israel) ISR	Yonatan Cohen	5	4	4	2	0	0	1	2	0	0
25	FW	(United States) USA	Aaron Schoenfeld	13	2	7	1	0	0	2	1	4	0
30	DF	(Israel) ISR	Maor Kandil	6	1	5	1	0	0	1	0	0	0
31	MF	(Israel) ISR	Shachar Piven	12	1	10	0	0	0	2	1	0	0
42	MF	(Israel) ISR	Dor Peretz	16	4	11	4	0	0	1	0	4	0
55	GK	(Israel) ISR	Haviv Ohayon	0	0	0	0	0	0	0	0	0	0
77	DF	(Israel) ISR	Roslan Barsky	13	0	6	0	0	0	2	0	5	0
95	GK	(Serbia) SRB	Predrag Rajković	22	0	14	0	0	0	2	0	6	0
Players away from Maccabi Tel Aviv on loan:
45	MF	(Israel) ISR	Eliel Peretz	1	0	0	0	0	0	1	0	0	0
Players who appeared for Maccabi Tel Aviv that left during the season:
77	DF	(Israel) ISR	Sean Goldberg	1	0	0	0	0	0	1	0	0	0
9	FW	(Iceland) ISL	Viðar Örn Kjartansson	7	2	0	0	0	0	1	0	6	2
