= 2019 Israel Super Cup =

| Maccabi Tel Aviv | Bnei Yehuda Tel Aviv |
| 1 | 0 |
- Date: 20 July 2019
- Venue: HaMoshava Stadium, Petah Tikva
- Referee: Eli Hachmon

2019 Israel Super Cup was the 24th Israel Super Cup (29th, including unofficial matches, as the competition wasn't played within the Israel Football Association in its first 5 editions, until 1969), an annual football match in Israel.

== History ==
The Super Cup is a competition between the winners of the previous season's Top Division and Israel State Cup. This is the fourth time since 1990 that the match was staged after a planned resumption of the cup was canceled in 2014.

In 2019, the game was played between Maccabi Tel Aviv, champions of the 2018–19 Israeli Premier League and Bnei Yehuda Tel Aviv, winners of the 2018–19 Israeli State Cup. Tel Aviv won 1-0.

== Match details ==
20 July 2019

| Maccabi Tel Aviv | 1–0 | Bnei Yehuda Tel Aviv |
|---|---|---|
| Schoenfeld 28' | Report |

HaMoshava Stadium, Petah Tikva
Referee: Eli Hacmon

| Maccabi Tel Aviv | Beni Yehuda Tel Aviv |

| GK | 17 | (Greece) Andreas Gianniotis |
| RB | 30 | (Israel) Maor Kandil (yellow card) 88' |
| CB | 21 | (Israel) Sheran Yeini (c) |
| CB | 31 | (Israel) Shahar Piven |
| LB | 20 | (Israel) Matan Baltaxa |
| DM | 6 | (Israel) Dan Glazer |
| CM | 77 | (Israel) Roslan Barsky |
| LM | 15 | (Israel) Dor Micha |
| RW | 45 | (Israel) Matan Hozez |
| CF | 24 | (Israel) Yonatan Cohen |
| LF | 25 | (Israel) Aaron Schoenfeld |
Substitutes:
| GK | 19 | (Brazil) Daniel Miller Tenenbaum |
| DF | 27 | (Israel) Ofir Davidzada |
| DF | 3 | (Spain) Jair Amador |
| MF | 42 | (Israel) Dor Peretz |
| MF | 22 | (Israel) Avi Rikan |
| FW | 16 | (Israel) Eliran Atar |
| FW | 11 | (Israel) Itay Shechter |
Manager:
(Serbia) Vladimir Ivić

| GK | 1 | (Lithuania) Emilijus Zubas |
| RB | 16 | (Israel) Avishay Cohen (substituted off) 71' |
| CB | 2 | (Israel) Dan Mori (c) |
| CB | 5 | (Israel) Daniel Flesher |
| LB | 77 | (Israel) Paz Ben Ari |
| DM | 6 | (Israel) Amir Rustum (yellow card) 17' |
| CM | 19 | (Ivory Coast) Ismaila Soro |
| LM | 18 | (Israel) Eitan Velblum (substituted off) 67' |
| RW | 10 | (Israel) Amit Zenati (yellow card) 14' |
| CF | 8 | (Israel) Shay Mazor |
| FW | 9 | (Israel) Dor Jan (substituted off) 79' |
Substitutes:
| GK | 55 | (Israel) Yehonatan Shabi |
| DF | 26 | (Israel) Roi Ben Shimon (substituted in) 79' |
| MF | 21 | (Israel) Sagas Tambi (substituted in) 67' |
| MF | 23 | (Israel) Ben Shimoni |
| MF | 15 | (Israel) Ariel Lazmi (substituted in) 71' |
| MF | 7 | (Israel) Nehoray Gigi |
| FW | 77 | (Israel) Rom Anu |
Manager:
(Israel) Yossi Abuksis

Man of the Match:

MATCH OFFICIALS

- Assistant referees:
  - Omer Barbiro
  - Tom Adi
- Fourth official:
  - Yigal Frid

Match rules

- 90 minutes.
- Penalty shoot-out if scores level.
- Seven named substitutes, of which up to three may be used.

== See also ==
- Sports in Israel
