= Dor Peretz =

Israeli footballer (born 1995)

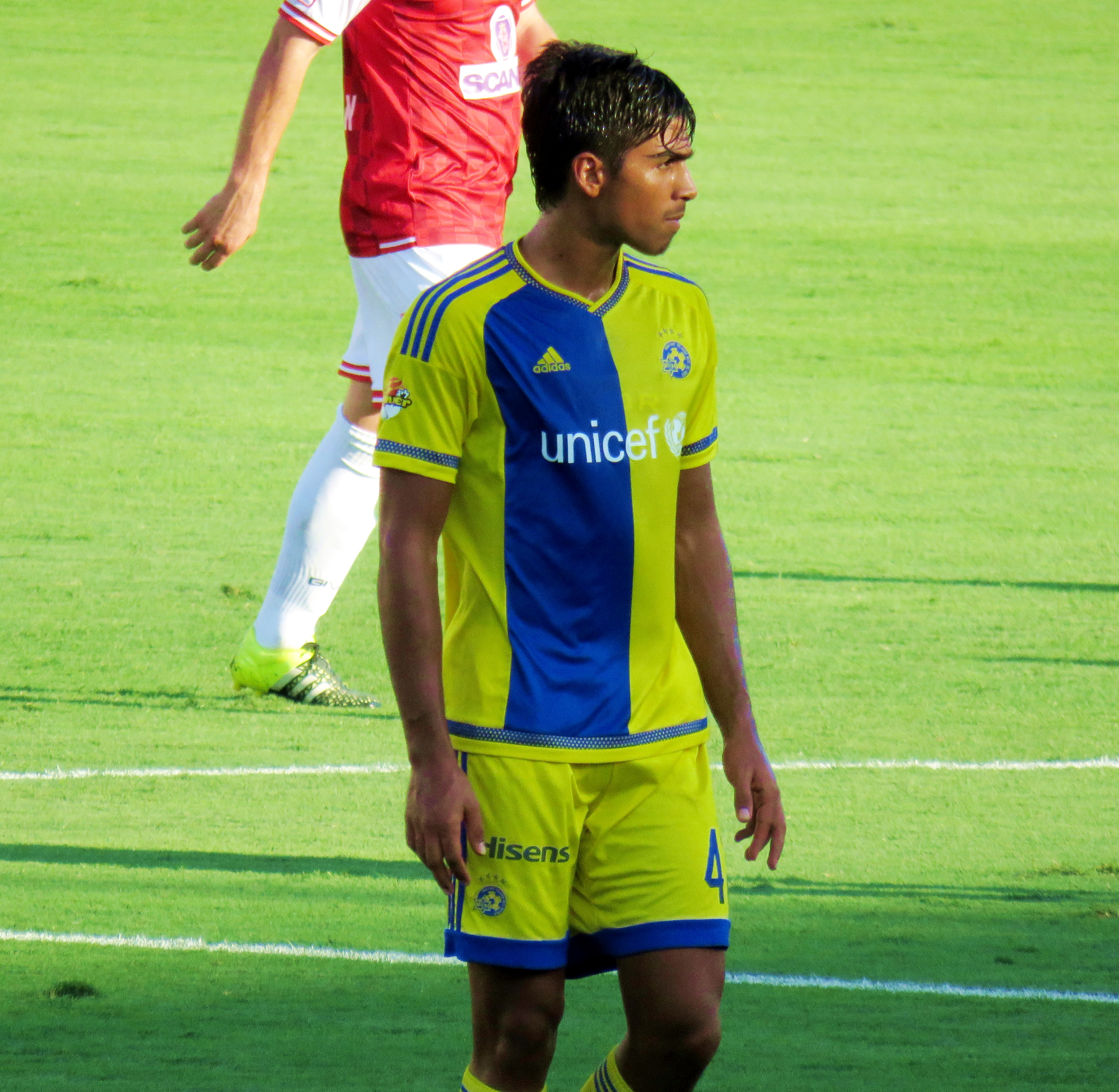
- Peretz playing for Maccabi Tel Aviv in 2015

Personal information
- Date of birth: 17 May 1995 (age 31)
- Place of birth: Hod HaSharon, Israel
- Height: 1.85 m (6 ft 1 in)
- Position: Midfielder

Team information
- Current team: Maccabi Tel Aviv
- Number: 42

Youth career
- 2004–2009: Hapoel Hod HaSharon
- 2009–2014: Maccabi Tel Aviv

Senior career*
Years	Team	Apps	(Gls)
2014–2021	Maccabi Tel Aviv	151	(18)
2017	→ Hapoel Haifa (loan)	14	(0)
2021–2022	Venezia	18	(0)
2022–	Maccabi Tel Aviv	145	(53)

International career^{‡}
2010–2011	Israel U16		
2015–	Israel	61	(11)
- * Club domestic league appearances and goals as of 2 November 2026 ‡ National team caps and goals as of 21:23, 17 November 2026 (UTC)

Dor Peretz (Hebrew: דור פרץ; born 17 May 1995) is an Israeli professional footballer who plays as a midfielder for Israeli Premier League club Maccabi Tel Aviv which he captains, and the Israel national team.

== Early life ==
Peretz was born and raised in Hod HaSharon, Israel, to an Israeli family of both Sephardi Jewish and Mizrahi Jewish descent. His older brother is former Israeli international footballer Reef Peretz. Peretz is observant (Masorti Jewish).

He also holds a Portuguese passport, on account of his Sephardi Jewish ancestors, which eases the move to certain European football leagues.

== Club career ==
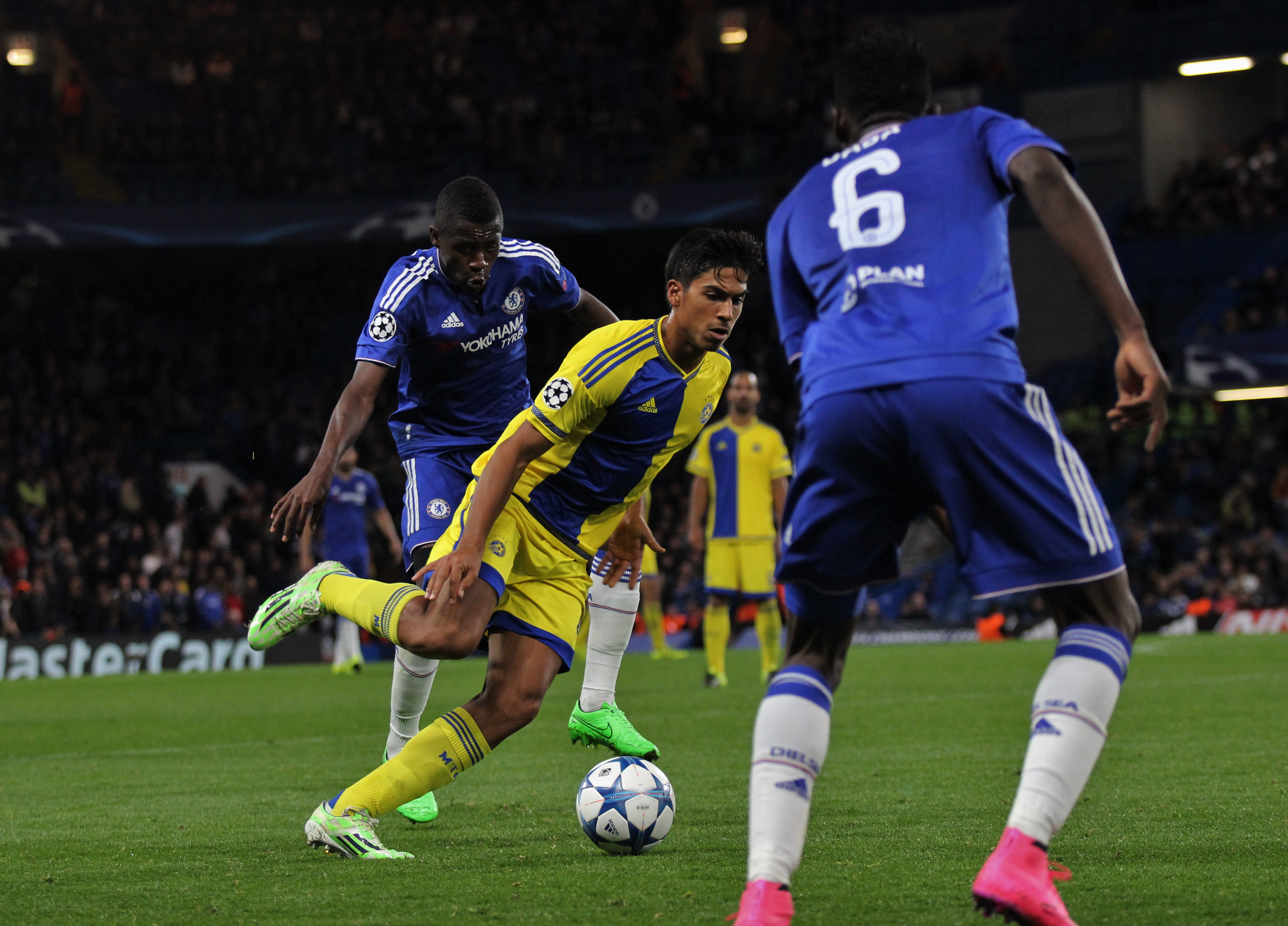
Peretz (center) playing for Maccabi Tel Aviv in a 2015–16 UEFA Champions League match against Chelsea

=== Maccabi Tel Aviv ===
On 12 August 2014, Peretz made his senior debut in Maccabi Tel Aviv during a Toto Cup match against Maccabi Netanya. On 10 September 2014, scored his first goal, in a 6–0 victory against Hapoel Petah Tikva. In his first season with the senior team he played 28 games in all competitions.

On 26 September 2015, Peretz scored the first goal in his senior career during a league match against Maccabi Haifa.

==== Hapoel Haifa (loan) ====
On 27 January 2017, he moved to Hapoel Haifa on loan until the end of the season.

=== Venezia ===
On 16 June 2021, Peretz signed for three seasons with Italian club Venezia, newly promoted to Serie A. He left Venezia by mutual consent on 5 July 2022.

=== Return to Maccabi Tel Aviv ===
On 15 August 2022, Peretz signed a new three-year contract with the former Israeli club of his, Maccabi Tel Aviv.

== International career ==
Peretz played all the youth teams of Israel since the under-16. On 7 June 2015, he made his debut for the Israel U-21 national team in a 4–0 win against Liechtenstein.

In 2015, Peretz was first called up to the Israel national team by the senior's head coach Eli Guttman. On 11 October 2018, he scored his first goal for the senior Israeli squad in a home match against Scotland in the 2018–19 UEFA Nations League, that ended in a 2–1 win for his native Israel.

== Career statistics ==
=== Club ===
As of match played 19 September 2026

Appearances and goals by club, season and competition
Club	Season	League			National cup (Note: Includes Israel State Cup, Coppa Italia)		League cup (Note: Includes Toto Cup)		Europe		Other		Total	
Club	Season	Division	Apps	Goals	Apps	Goals	Apps	Goals	Apps	Goals	Apps	Goals	Apps	Goals
Maccabi Tel Aviv	2014–15	Israeli Premier League	19	0	1	0	1	1	0	0	—		21	1
Maccabi Tel Aviv	2015–16	Israeli Premier League	24	1	3	0	0	0	7 (Note: Appearances in UEFA Champions League)	0	—		34	1
Maccabi Tel Aviv	2016–17	Israeli Premier League	4	0	2	0	0	0	8 (Note: Appearances in UEFA Europa League)	0	—		14	0
Maccabi Tel Aviv	2017–18	Israeli Premier League	24	1	1	0	1	0	9	1	—		35	2
Maccabi Tel Aviv	2018–19	Israeli Premier League	31	8	3	0	0	0	5	0	—		39	8
Maccabi Tel Aviv	2019–20	Israeli Premier League	15	1	0	0	0	0	4 (Note: Two appearances in UEFA Champions League, and two appearances in UEFA Europa League)	0	0	0	19	1
Maccabi Tel Aviv	2020–21	Israeli Premier League	34	7	5	2	4	2	11 (Note: Three appearances in UEFA Champions League, and eight appearances and one goal in UEFA Europa League)	1	2 (Note: Appearance(s) in Israel Super Cup)	0	56	12
Maccabi Tel Aviv	Total		151	18	15	2	6	2	44	2	2	0	218	24
Hapoel Haifa (loan)	2016–17	Israeli Premier League	14	0	2	0	0	0	—		—		16	0
Venezia	2021–22	Serie A	18	0	3	0	—		—		—		21	0
Maccabi Tel Aviv	2022–23	Israeli Premier League	35	3	1	0	1	0	1 (Note: Appearance(s) in UEFA Conference League)	0	—		38	3
Maccabi Tel Aviv	2023–24	Israeli Premier League	34	10	1	0	3	2	13	7	—		51	19
Maccabi Tel Aviv	2024–25	Israeli Premier League	35	11	0	0	2	2	14 (Note: Two appearances in UEFA Champions League, twelve appearances and five goals in UEFA Europa League)	5	1	0	52	18
Maccabi Tel Aviv	2025–26	Israeli Premier League	33	19	3	1	0	0	14 (Note: Two appearances in UEFA Champions League, twelve appearances and two goals in UEFA Europa League)	2	1	0	51	22
Maccabi Tel Aviv	2026–27	Israeli Premier League	5	8	0	0	1	0	6 (Note: Four appearances and two goals in UEFA Europa League, two appearances and one goal in UEFA Conference League)	3	1	1	13	12
Maccabi Tel Aviv	Total		142	51	5	1	7	4	48	17	3	1	205	74
Career total			325	69	25	3	13	6	92	19	5	1	460	98

=== International ===
As of match played 17 November 2026
Scores and results list Israel's goal tally first, score column indicates score after each Peretz goal.

List of international goals scored by Dor Peretz
No.	Date	Venue	Opponent	Score	Result	Competition
1	11 October 2018	Sammy Ofer Stadium, Haifa, Israel	Scotland	1–1	2–1	2018–19 UEFA Nations League C
2	28 March 2021	Bloomfield Stadium, Tel Aviv, Israel	Scotland	1–0	1–1	2022 FIFA World Cup qualification
3	12 November 2021	Wörthersee Stadion, Klagenfurt, Austria	Austria	2–1	2–4	2022 FIFA World Cup qualification
4	15 November 2021	Netanya Stadium, Netanya, Israel	Faroe Islands	3–2	3–2	2022 FIFA World Cup qualification
5	13 June 2022	Laugardalsvöllur, Reykjavík, Iceland	Iceland	2–2	2–2	2022–23 UEFA Nations League B
6	25 March 2023	Bloomfield Stadium, Tel Aviv, Israel	Kosovo	1–1	1–1	2024 UEFA Euro qualifying
7	5 September 2025	Zimbru Stadium, Chișinău, Moldova	Moldova	1–0	4–0	2026 FIFA World Cup qualification
8	8 September 2025	Nagyerdei Stadion, Debrecen, Hungary	Italy	2–1	4–5	2026 FIFA World Cup qualification
9	8 September 2025	Nagyerdei Stadion, Debrecen, Hungary	Italy	4–4	4–5	2026 FIFA World Cup qualification
10	4 October 2026	TSC Arena, Bačka Topola, Serbia	Republic of Ireland	1–1	1–1	2026–27 UEFA Nations League B
11	17 November 2026	Nagyerdei Stadion, Debrecen, Hungary	Austria	1–0	1–1	2026–27 UEFA Nations League B

== Honours ==
Maccabi Tel Aviv

- Israeli Premier League: 2014–15, 2018–19, 2019–20, 2023–24, 2024–25
- Israel State Cup: 2014–15, 2020–21, 2025–26
- Toto Cup: 2014–15, 2017–18, 2018–19, 2020–21, 2023–24, 2024–25
- Israel Super Cup: 2019, 2020, 2024, 2026

Individual

- ONE's Israeli Premier League Player of the Month: December 2016
- Israeli Footballer of the Year: 2025
