= Omer Atzili =

Israeli footballer (born 1993)

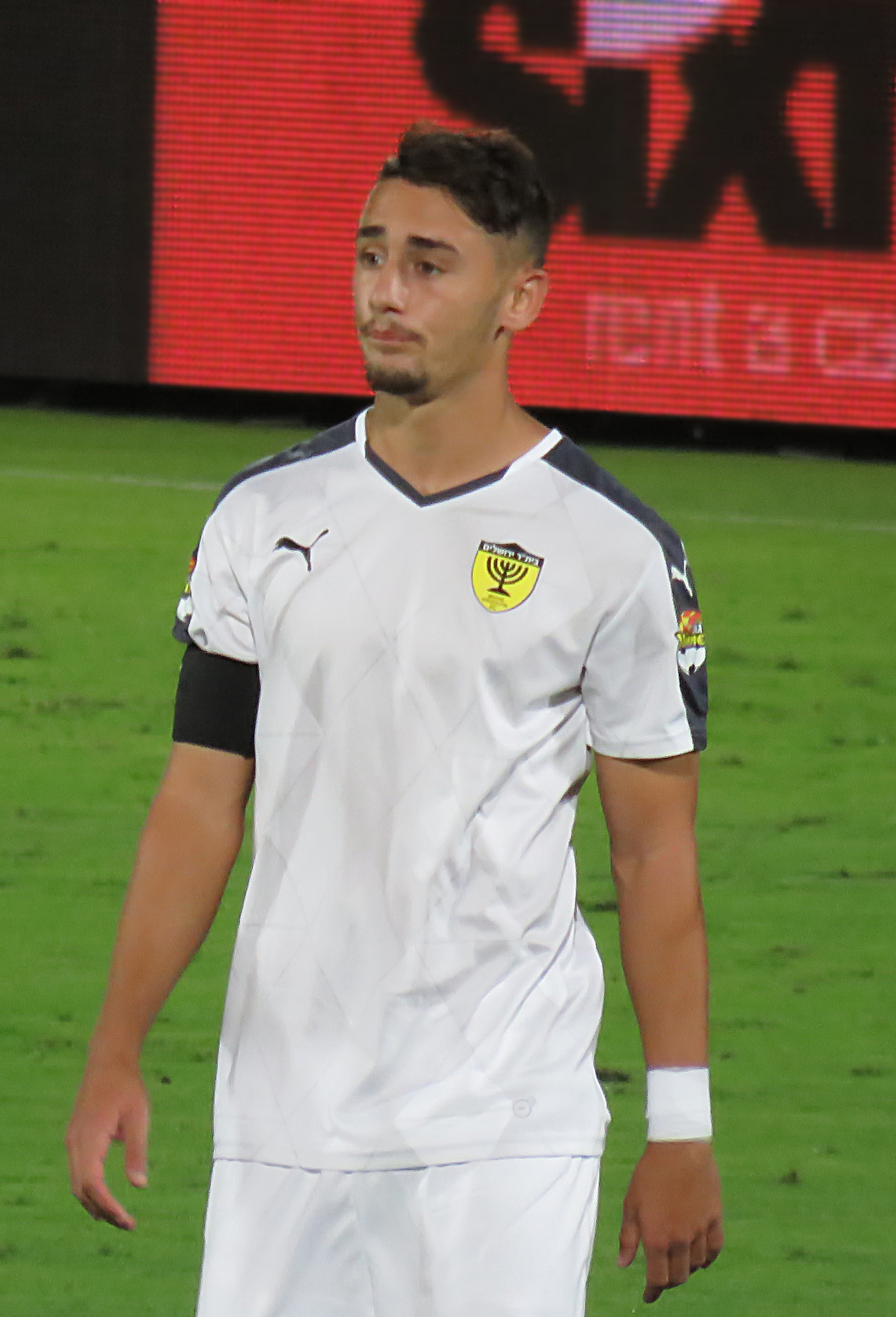
- Atzili captaining Beitar Jerusalem in 2015

Personal information
- Full name: Omer Yosef Atzili
- Date of birth: 27 July 1993 (age 33)
- Place of birth: Holon, Israel
- Height: 1.80 m (5 ft 11 in)
- Positions: Attacking midfielder; winger

Team information
- Current team: Beitar Jerusalem

Youth career
- 2002–2009: Maccabi Tel Aviv
- 2010–2013: Hapoel Rishon LeZion

Senior career*
Years	Team	Apps	(Gls)
2011–2013	Hapoel Rishon LeZion	37	(7)
2013–2016	Beitar Jerusalem	78	(14)
2016–2017	Granada	9	(0)
2017–2020	Maccabi Tel Aviv	67	(29)
2020–2021	APOEL	11	(0)
2021–2023	Maccabi Haifa	91	(46)
2023–2024	Al Ain	20	(4)
2024–2025	Omonia	7	(0)
2025–	Beitar Jerusalem	51	(22)

International career^{‡}
2012	Israel U19	3	(0)
2013	Israel U21	3	(0)
2016–2022	Israel	6	(0)
- * Club domestic league appearances and goals as of 23 June 2026 ‡ National team caps and goals as of 24 September 2022

Omer Yosef Atzili Hebrew: עומר יוסף אצילי; born 27 July 1993) is an Israeli professional footballer who plays as an attacking midfielder or a winger for Israeli Premier League club Beitar Jerusalem.

Atzili was a full international from 2016 to 2022, earning six senior caps for his native Israel.

== Early and personal life ==
Atzili was born and raised in Holon, Israel, to an Israeli family of Ashkenazi Jewish (Romanian-Jewish) descent. His maternal grandfather was born in Bucharest, Romania.

He also holds a Romanian passport, on account of his Ashkenazi Jewish ancestors, which eases the move to certain European football leagues.

He married his Israeli girlfriend Or (née Ben-David) in 2018. They have a son who was born in 2018, and a daughter born in 2020. They currently reside in Israel's capital city of Jerusalem.

== Club career ==
Atzili started his career at Israeli side Maccabi Tel Aviv's youth setup in 2002. In 2010, he moved to Israeli side Hapoel Rishon LeZion, spending the last season out of three with them playing for both the youth and senior squads.

=== Hapoel Rishon LeZion ===
Atzili made his senior debut on 30 July 2011, coming on as a 77th-minute substitute in a 2–1 home win against Hapoel Be'er Sheva, during the Israel Toto Cup for the Israeli Premier League clubs.

Atzili scored his first senior goal in the Israeli Premier League on 12 May 2012, in a 2–1 home loss against Hapoel Acre; his side also suffered relegation in the end of the season. He subsequently became an important unit for the club in Liga Leumit, scoring six goals as his side missed out promotion in the play-offs; highlights included a brace in a 2–2 draw at Maccabi Petah Tikva on 10 May 2013. Atzili helped his side win the 2012–13 Israel Toto Cup for the Israeli Liga Leumit clubs.

=== Beitar Jerusalem ===
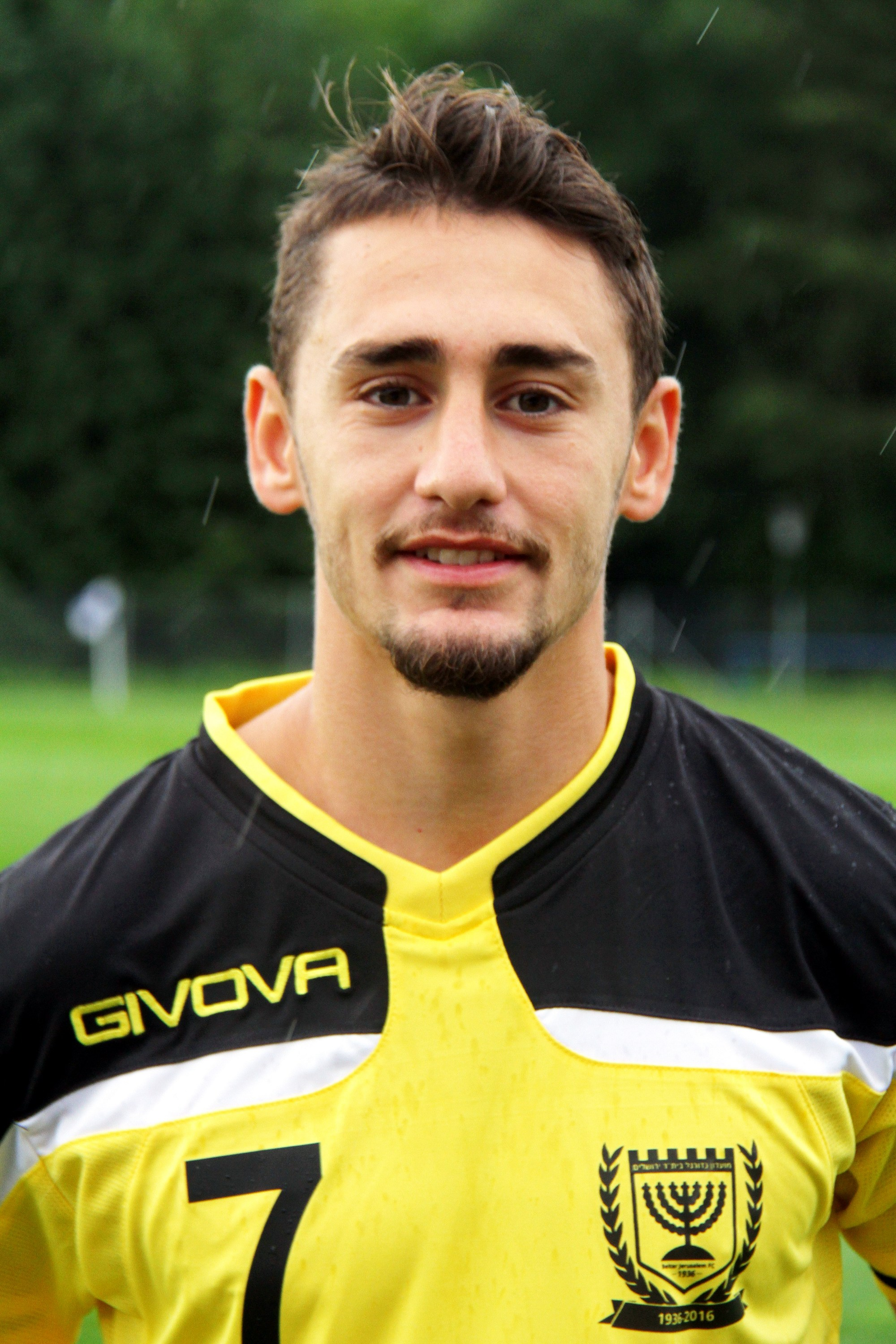
Atzili with Beitar Jerusalem in 2016

On 30 July 2013, Atzili signed a four-year contract with Israeli Premier League club Beitar Jerusalem. He made his first debut for the club on 24 August 2013, by starting in a 2–0 home loss against Hapoel Be'er Sheva, and was mainly used as a substitute during his first season.

Atzili only became an undisputed starter for Beitar Jerusalem during the 2015–16 season, where he scored a career-best seven goals.

He also captained Beitar Jerusalem.

=== Granada ===
On 31 August 2016, Atzili signed a four-year deal with Spanish La Liga side Granada CF, for a rumoured fee of €750,000. He made his debut in the La Liga on 11 September, starting in a 2–1 home loss against SD Eibar.

Atzili played 11 total league and cup matches, starting five, for the Andalusian club. He did not manage to score, the club was relegated at the end of the 2016–17 season and Atzili left Granada.

=== Maccabi Tel Aviv ===
On 20 June 2017, Atzili signed a four-year deal with Israeli Premier League club Maccabi Tel Aviv.

=== APOEL ===
On 23 August 2020, Atzili signed a two-year contract with the Cypriot First Division club APOEL. In the mid-season transfer window he was released from his contract, leaving on 5 January 2021.

=== Maccabi Haifa ===
On 13 January 2021, Atzili signed a three-and-a-half-year deal with Israeli Premier League club Maccabi Haifa.

On 23 August 2022, Atzili assisted his team's last qualifying goal during their 2022–23 UEFA Champions League Play-offs second leg against Serbian side Red Star Belgrade, with a 90th minute free kick that made a rival player score an own goal, earning Maccabi Haifa a 2–2 away draw (5–4 on aggregate), and a place in the UEFA Champions League Group Stage. On 11 October 2022, Atzili scored both his first and second Champions League goals, by netting a brace in a 2–0 home win over Italian side Juventus, to be his club's first victory in the competition since the 2002–03 season. He also received UEFA's Player of the Match award for this game.

=== Al Ain ===
On 14 June 2023, he signed a three-year deal with UAE Pro League club Al Ain, becoming the first Israeli Jew to play in an Arab country. His annual salary is estimated to be around $1.9 million, excluding any victory bonuses. During his presentation, he was introduced as a Romanian player rather than an Israeli. Prior to accepting the transfer, he had specific requests related to his faith, Judaism, allowing him the freedom to abstain from playing or training during various Israeli and Jewish holidays and memorial days. Additionally, a clause in the contract states that he will not participate in away matches outside the Emirates for the AFC Asian Champions League. This provision is in consideration of the potential encounters with clubs from countries that are extremely hostile against Jews and especially against his native Israel, such as Iran, Iraq, Lebanon or Syria, among several other Muslim or Arab countries in the AFC competitions. A great number of Emiratis expressed their opposition to his signing as well.

=== Omonia ===
He went to Omonoia Nicosia for vacations and to avoid taxes on Israel. As soon he avoid taxes holidays finished and he returned to Israel

=== Beitar Jerusalem ===
Atzili returned to the Israeli Premier League club of his early career Beitar Jerusalem, for which he signed an initial contract on 24 December 2024.

== International career ==
Atzili represented Israel internationally at youth levels from under-19 to under-21.

Atzili was first called up to the Israeli senior national team on 31 August 2016, for a 2018 FIFA World Cup qualifiers match against Italy. He then made his senior debut with Israel on 5 September 2016, substituting Nir Bitton in a 1–3 home loss against Italy.

On 10 November 2022, Atzili announced his retirement from the Israel national team.

== Career statistics ==
As of match played 7 March 2024

Appearances and goals by club, season and competition
Club	Season	League			National cup (Note: Includes Copa del Rey, Israel State Cup, Cypriot Cup, UAE President's Cup)		League cup (Note: Includes Toto Cup, UAE League Cup)		Continental		Other		Total	
Club	Season	Division	Apps	Goals	Apps	Goals	Apps	Goals	Apps	Goals	Apps	Goals	Apps	Goals
Granada	2016–17	La Liga	9	0	2	0	–		–		–		11	0
Maccabi Tel Aviv	2017–18	Israeli Premier League	17	10	0	0	3	0	11 (Note: Appearances in UEFA Europa League)	2	–		31	12
Maccabi Tel Aviv	2018–19	Israeli Premier League	29	11	4	0	2	1	7	1	–		42	13
Maccabi Tel Aviv	2019–20	Israeli Premier League	21	8	5	0	0	0	0	0	0	0	26	8
Maccabi Tel Aviv	Total		67	29	9	0	5	1	18	3	0	0	99	33
Apoel	2020–21	Cypriot First Division	11	0	1	1	–		3	2	–		15	3
Maccabi Haifa	2020–21	Israeli Premier League	21	4	3	2	–		–		–		24	6
Maccabi Haifa	2021–22	Israeli Premier League	33	20	5	2	2	0	12 (Note: Two appearances and one goal in UEFA Champions League, ten appearances and four goals in UEFA Europa League)	5	1 (Note: Appearance in Israel Super Cup)	0	53	27
Maccabi Haifa	2022–23	Israeli Premier League	35	22	4	1	1	1	12 (Note: Appearances in UEFA Europa Conference League)	2	1	1	53	27
Maccabi Haifa	Total		89	46	12	5	3	1	24	7	2	1	130	60
Al Ain	2023–24	UAE Pro League	12	3	1	0	5	2	2 (Note: Appearances in AFC Champions League)	1	—		20	6
Career total			188	78	23	6	13	4	47	13	2	1	273	102

== Honours ==
Hapoel Rishon LeZion

- Israel Toto Cup (Liga Leumit): 2012–13

Maccabi Tel Aviv

- Israeli Premier League: 2018–19, 2019–20
- Israel Toto Cup (Ligat Ha'Al): 2017–18, 2018–19

Maccabi Haifa

- Israeli Premier League: 2020–21, 2021–22, 2022–23
- Israel Toto Cup (Ligat Ha'Al): 2021–22
- Israel Super Cup: 2021

Al Ain

- AFC Champions League: 2023–24

Individual

- Israeli Footballer of the Year: 2021–22, 2022–23
- Israeli Premier League Top scorer: 2021–22, 2022–23
- Israeli Premier League Top assist provider: 2020–21, 2021–22
- Israeli Premier League Player of the Month: December 2021, March 2023
