= Dan Glazer =

Israeli footballer (born 1996)

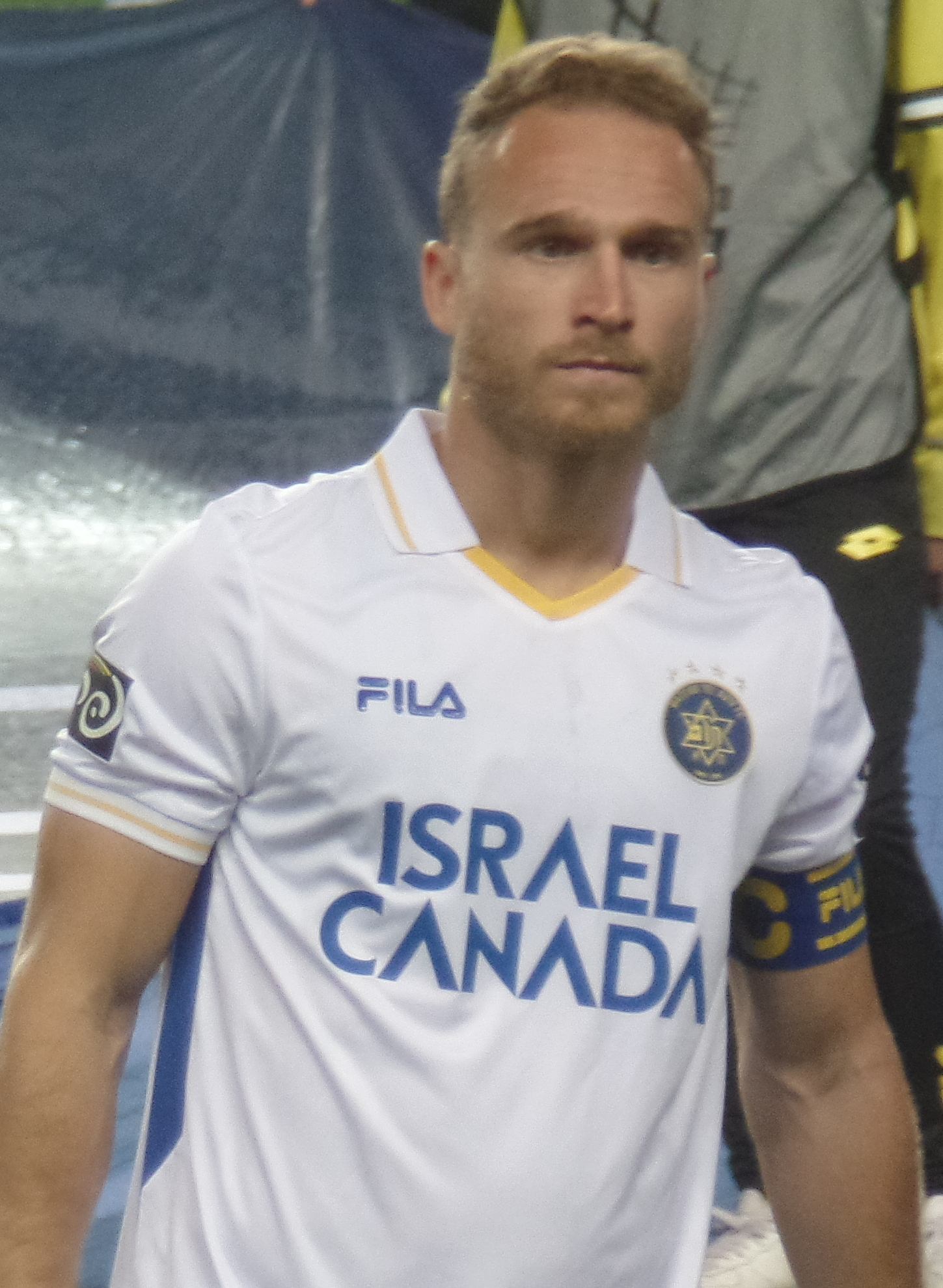
- Glazer with Maccabi Tel Aviv in 2022

Personal information
- Full name: Dan Leon Glazer
- Date of birth: 20 September 1996 (age 30)
- Place of birth: Tel Aviv, Israel
- Height: 1.78 m (5 ft 10 in)
- Position: Defensive midfielder

Team information
- Current team: Maccabi Tel Aviv
- Number: 18

Youth career
- 2004–2016: Maccabi Tel Aviv

Senior career*
Years	Team	Apps	(Gls)
2014–2023	Maccabi Tel Aviv	144	(1)
2016–2017	→ Beitar Tel Aviv Ramla (loan)	42	(2)
2017–2018	→ Maccabi Netanya (loan)	28	(1)
2023–2024	OFI	18	(0)
2024–2025	Pari Nizhny Novgorod	10	(0)
2025–2026	Kairat	26	(0)
2026–	Maccabi Tel Aviv	0	(0)

International career^{‡}
2011–2012	Israel U16	12	(0)
2012–2013	Israel U17	16	(1)
2013	Israel U18	5	(0)
2014	Israel U19	13	(0)
2017–2018	Israel U21	7	(0)
2018–	Israel	21	(0)
- * Club domestic league appearances and goals as of 2 July 2026 ‡ National team caps and goals as of 11 June 2024

Dan Leon Glazer (or Glezer, Hebrew: דן ליאון גלזר; born 20 September 1996) is an Israeli professional footballer who plays as a defensive midfielder for Israeli Premier League club Maccabi Tel Aviv and the Israel national team.

== Early life ==
Glazer was born and raised in Tel Aviv-Yafo, Israel, to an Israeli family of Ashkenazi Jewish (German-Jewish) descent. He is the cousin of fellow Maccabi Tel Aviv academy graduate Daniel Peretz, and the older brother of twin-brothers Tamir Glazer and Amit Glazer, who are all Israeli international footballers as well.

He also holds a German passport, on account of his Ashkenazi Jewish ancestors, which eases the move to certain European football leagues.

== Club career ==
On 11 September 2023, Glazer signed a two-year contract with Super League Greece club OFI.

On 9 July 2024, Glazer moved to Pari Nizhny Novgorod in the Russian Premier League on a multi-year contract.

On 15 January 2025, Glazer signed a contract until the end of 2026 with Kairat of the Kazakhstan Premier League.

== International career ==
Glazer made his international debut for the Israel senior team on 11 September 2018, coming on as a substitute in the 74th minute during a friendly match against Northern Ireland, which finished as a 0–3 away loss.

== Career statistics ==
=== Club ===
As of 2 July 2026

Appearances and goals by club, season and competition
Club	Season	League			National cup		League Cup		Continental		Other		Total	
Club	Season	Division	Apps	Goals	Apps	Goals	Apps	Goals	Apps	Goals	Apps	Goals	Apps	Goals
Maccabi Tel Aviv	2014–15	Israeli Premier League	0	0	0	0	1	0	—		—		1	0
Maccabi Tel Aviv	2015–16	Israeli Premier League	0	0	0	0	2	—	—		2	0		
Maccabi Tel Aviv	2018–19	Israeli Premier League	30	1	2	0	3	0	4	0	—		39	1
Maccabi Tel Aviv	2019–20	Israeli Premier League	33	0	0	0	2	0	4	0	1	0	40	0
Maccabi Tel Aviv	2020–21	Israeli Premier League	23	0	3	0	0	0	11	0	2	0	39	0
Maccabi Tel Aviv	2021–22	Israeli Premier League	31	0	3	0	0	0	12	1	1	0	47	1
Maccabi Tel Aviv	2022–23	Israeli Premier League	26	0	3	0	0	0	4	0	—		33	0
Maccabi Tel Aviv	2023–24	Israeli Premier League	1	0	0	0	0	0	0	0	—		1	0
Maccabi Tel Aviv	Total		144	1	11	0	8	0	41	1	4	0	208	2
Beitar Tel Aviv Ramla (loan)	2015–16	Israel Liga Leumit	10	0	0	0	0	0	—		—		10	0
Beitar Tel Aviv Ramla (loan)	2016–17	Israel Liga Leumit	32	2	1	0	0	0	—		—		33	2
Beitar Tel Aviv Ramla (loan)	Total		42	2	1	0	0	0	0	0	0	0	43	2
Maccabi Netanya (loan)	2017–18	Israeli Premier League	28	1	2	0	3	0	—		—		33	1
OFI	2023–24	Super League Greece	22	0	2	0	—		—		—		24	0
Nizhny Novgorod	2024–25	Russian Premier League	10	0	5	0	—		—		—		15	0
Kairat	2025	Kazakhstan Premier League	15	0	1	0	—		10 (Note: Appearances in UEFA Champions League)	0	1 (Note: Appearance in Kazakhstan Super Cup)	0	26	0
Kairat	2026	Kazakhstan Premier League	11	0	0	0	—		2	0	1	0	14	0
Kairat	Total		26	0	1	0	—		12	0	2	0	40	0
Maccabi Tel Aviv	2026–27	Israeli Premier League	0	0	0	0	0	0	0	0	—		0	0
Career total			272	4	22	0	11	0	53	1	5	0	363	5

=== International ===
As of match played 11 June 2024

Israel
Year	Apps	Goals
2018	2	0
2019	5	0
2020	1	0
2021	3	0
2022	7	0
2023	2	0
2024	1	0
Total	21	0

== Honours ==
Maccabi Tel Aviv

- Israeli Premier League: 2018–19, 2019–20
- Israel Toto Cup (Ligat Ha'Al): 2018–19, 2020–21
- Israel Super Cup: 2019, 2020
- Israel State Cup: 2020–21

Individual

- Israeli Footballer of the Year: 2019–20

== See also ==
- List of Jewish footballers
- List of Jews in sports
- List of Israelis
