= Viki Kahlon =

Israeli footballer

Personal information
- Full name: Viki Kahlon
- Date of birth: January 15, 1993 (age 33)
- Place of birth: Netanya, Israel
- Position: Right back

Team information
- Current team: Bnei Hertzeliya

Youth career
- Maccabi Netanya

Senior career*
| Years | Team | Apps | (Gls) |
| 2012–2020 | Maccabi Netanya | 120 | (4) |
| 2015–2016 | → Hapoel Petah Tikva (loan) | 31 | (1) |
| 2021 | Hapoel Ramat HaSharon | 12 | (0) |
| 2021–2022 | Hapoel Nof HaGalil | 14 | (0) |
| 2022 | Hapoel Petah Tikva | 12 | (0) |
| 2022–2023 | Ironi Tiberias | 29 | (2) |
| 2023–2024 | Hapoel Rishon LeZion | 0 | (0) |
| 2024–2025 | Tira | 11 | (0) |
| 2025– | Bnei Hertzeliya | 5 | (0) |
- * Club domestic league appearances and goals as of 15 June 2025

Viki Kahlon (Hebrew: ויקי כחלון) is an Israeli footballer who plays in Bnei Hertzeliya.

He made his debut for the senior side in a league game against F.C. Ashdod on 20 April 2013.

== Honours ==
- Liga Leumit
  - Winner (2): 2013-14, 2016-17
