= Enric Saborit =

Spanish-Catalan footballer

Personal information
- Full name: Enric Saborit Teixidor
- Date of birth: 27 April 1992 (age 34)
- Place of birth: Barcelona, Spain
- Height: 1.87 m (6 ft 1 1/2 in)
- Position: Left-back

Team information
- Current team: AEK Larnaca
- Number: 4

Youth career
- Espanyol
- 2008–2010: Athletic Bilbao

Senior career*
Years	Team	Apps	(Gls)
2010	Basconia	4	(0)
2010–2016	Bilbao Athletic	115	(6)
2013–2018	Athletic Bilbao	33	(0)
2014–2015	→ Mallorca (loan)	16	(0)
2018–2024	Maccabi Tel Aviv	176	(10)
2024–2025	Gaziantep	10	(1)
2025	Deportes Iquique	8	(2)
2025–	AEK Larnaca	23	(3)

International career
2008–2009	Spain U17	6	(0)
2010	Spain U18	2	(1)
2010–2011	Spain U19	2	(0)
- * Club domestic league appearances and goals as of 7 November 2026

Enric Saborit Teixidor (Catalan pronunciation: [ənˈrik səβuˈɾit]; born 27 April 1992) is a Spanish professional footballer who plays as a left-back for Cypriot First Division club AEK Larnaca.

Developed at Athletic Bilbao, where he was mainly a reserve, he spent most of his professional career at Maccabi Tel Aviv, making over 200 total appearances and winning the Israeli Premier League three times.

== Club career ==
=== Athletic Bilbao ===
Born in Barcelona, Catalonia and raised in Mataró, at the age of 16 Saborit left the youth ranks of local RCD Espanyol and moved to Vitoria-Gasteiz where his mother was living. He joined Athletic Bilbao a short time later, prompting debate over whether his signing met the criteria of the club's policy as he had no link to the Basque region other than the short period of residency in the territory.

After graduating from Athletic's youth academy at Lezama, Saborit spent three full seasons with the reserves in the Segunda División B. He played 36 games in 2012–13, playoffs included.

Saborit made his La Liga debut with the Lions on 25 August 2013, playing the full 90 minutes in a 2–0 win against CA Osasuna at the Anoeta Stadium. On 9 July 2014, having been sparingly used in his debut campaign, he was loaned to RCD Mallorca of Segunda División.

Saborit returned to Bilbao Athletic in 2015–16, and featured regularly in their attempt to stay in the second tier, which ultimately proved unsuccessful. He made one appearance for the first team against AZ Alkmaar, in the group stage of the UEFA Europa League, starting and assisting with his head to Kike Sola's goal to mark his European debut.

Saborit was promoted once more to the main squad for the 2016–17 season, as understudy to Mikel Balenziaga. He scored his first senior goal on 8 December 2016, in a 1–1 draw at SK Rapid Wien in the Europa League group phase.

At the end of the 2017–18 campaign, in which he featured in 23 matches in all competitions, Saborit was released by Athletic.

=== Maccabi Tel Aviv ===
On 26 June 2018, Saborit signed for Maccabi Tel Aviv F.C. on a three-year contract. He won Israeli Premier League titles in his first two seasons, and on 10 December 2020 he scored the only goal of a home win over Sivasspor to advance into the Europa League knockout stage at the Turkish club's expense.

Saborit and other foreign Maccabi players were briefly evacuated from the country during the Israel–Palestine crisis in May 2021, returning the following month to win the State Cup against city rivals Hapoel Tel Aviv FC; he subsequently extended his contract to 2024. In the last 32 of the UEFA Europa Conference League on 24 February 2022, he netted a late equaliser against PSV Eindhoven at Bloomfield Stadium, though the visitors advanced with their goal from the first leg.

=== Later career ===
On 30 July 2024, Saborit joined Gaziantep F.K. of the Turkish Süper Lig on a one-year deal. In March 2025, he switched to the Chilean Primera División with Deportes Iquique, being allowed to leave on 18 June for personal reasons.

Saborit remained abroad in the 2025–26 season, with the 33-year-old agreeing to a two-year contract at Cypriot First Division club AEK Larnaca FC.

== Honours ==
Maccabi Tel Aviv

- Israeli Premier League: 2018–19, 2019–20, 2023–24
- Israel State Cup: 2020–21
- Toto Cup: 2018–19, 2020–21
- Israel Super Cup: 2019, 2020
