= Itay Shechter =

Israeli footballer

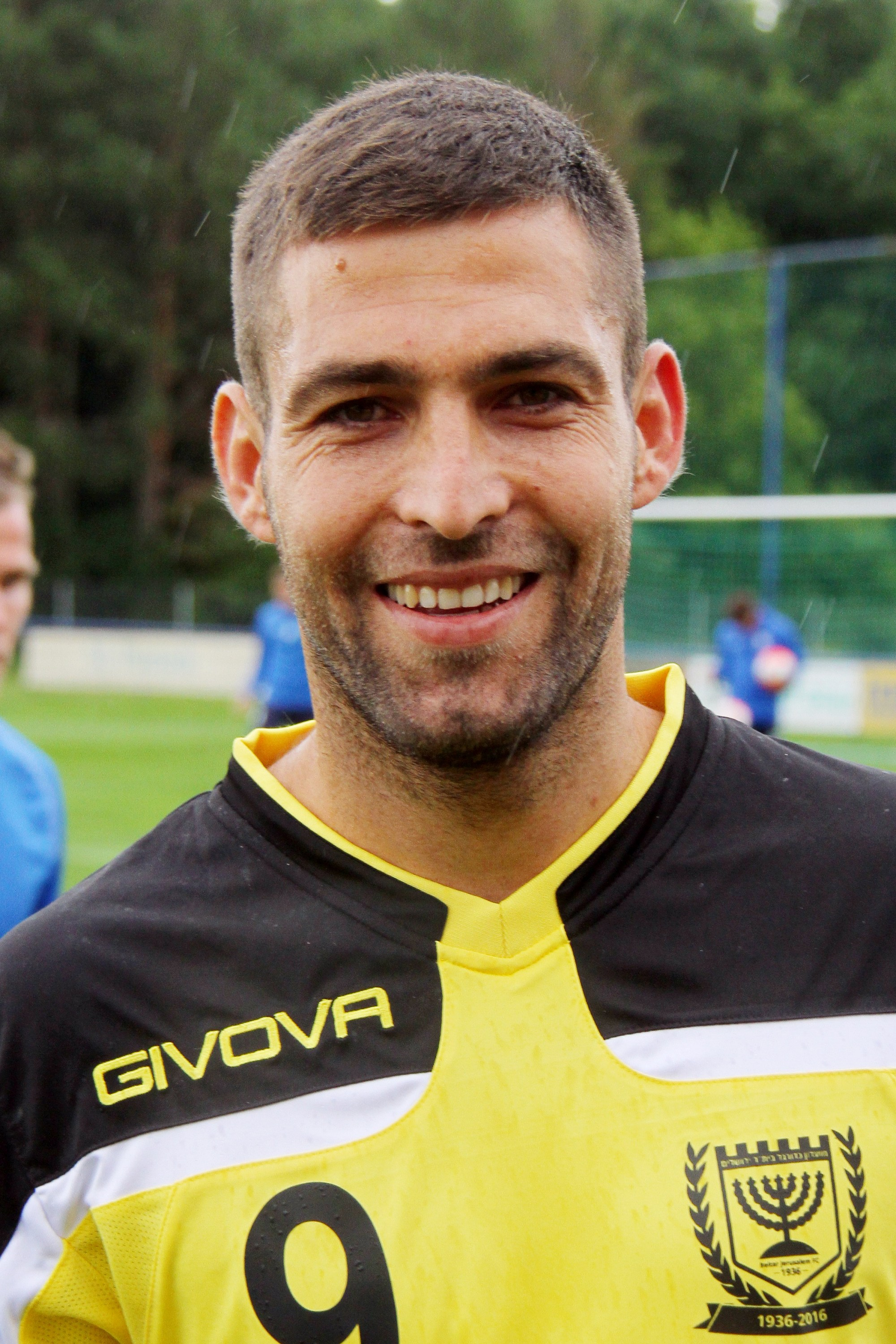
- Shechter with Beitar Jerusalem in 2016

Personal information
- Full name: Itay Menachem Shechter
- Date of birth: 22 February 1987 (age 39)
- Place of birth: Ramat Yishai, Israel
- Height: 1.78 m (5 ft 10 in)
- Position: Striker

Youth career
- 1998–2001: Hapoel Haifa
- 2001–2005: Hapoel Nazareth Illit

Senior career*
Years	Team	Apps	(Gls)
2005–2006	Hapoel Nazareth Illit	27	(3)
2006–2009	Maccabi Netanya	83	(21)
2009–2011	Hapoel Tel Aviv	45	(26)
2011–2013	1. FC Kaiserslautern	23	(3)
2012–2013	→ Swansea City (loan)	18	(1)
2013–2014	Hapoel Tel Aviv	16	(7)
2014	→ Nantes (loan)	11	(0)
2014–2015	Nantes	13	(1)
2015–2016	Maccabi Haifa	24	(2)
2016–2018	Beitar Jerusalem	80	(26)
2018–2021	Maccabi Tel Aviv	95	(18)
2021–2023	Hapoel Be'er Sheva	40	(3)
2023–2024	Hapoel Petah Tikva	16	(1)

International career^{‡}
2005	Israel U18	6	(9)
2005–2006	Israel U19	16	(6)
2006–2008	Israel U21	16	(5)
2009–2017	Israel	27	(5)
Medal record
Representing Israel
Football
Maccabiah Games
Gold medal – first place	2005 Maccabiah	Football
- * Club domestic league appearances and goals as of 22:50, 15 May 2023 (UTC) ‡ National team caps and goals as of 23 November 2022 (UTC)

Itay Menachem Shechter (or Etey Schechter, Hebrew: איתי שכטר; born 22 February 1987) is a retired Israeli professional footballer who played as a striker.

== Early life ==
Shechter was born in Ramat Yishai, Israel, to a family of Ashkenazi Jewish (Romanian-Jewish) descent. As a senior footballer, Shechter attended Torah classes twice a week, and also puts on tefillin every morning.

== Club career ==
=== Early career in Israel ===
Shechter started his career in the Hapoel Haifa youth team where in 1999–2000 he won the Israeli Youth Cup at the age of 13.

One year later, Shechter moved to the youth club F.C. Emek Izra'el and helped the club promote in four seasons from the fourth league to the first league in youth football. Three years after moving to Emek Izra'el, the youth club was joined to the youth club of Hapoel Nazareth Illit, which played in the Israeli Premier League at the same season, and the new club was renamed Hapoel Nazareth Illit/Emek Izra'el. Shechter was eventually promoted to the first team of Hapoel Nazareth Illit in the Israeli Premier League.

His first game in the Israeli Premier League was on 29 August 2005 during Nazareth Illit's 1–2 defeat to F.C. Ashdod, when he came on as a substitute. He scored his first goal in Nazareth Illit first team against Maccabi Netanya in a 3–1 loss in the Israeli Premier League, scoring the only goal for his club in this game.

He won a gold medal with Team Israel, alongside Yuval Spungin, in the 2005 Maccabiah Games.

Shechter has made 10 appearances for the Israel national under-21 football team, was capped several times at youth level. His first appearance in the U-21 team was on the losing side to Cyprus, losing 2–1 in a friendly game, Shechter scored the only goal for the Israeli team in this game.

In 2006, Shechter moved to Maccabi Netanya because he wanted to move to a bigger club than Nazareth Illit, which had just been relegated to Liga Leumit. While at the club, Shechter would soon play in the important member in the first team, due to his goal and assist. In his three season with Maccabi Netanya, he would score twenty-one in eighty-three appearances. In addition, Shechter soon attracted interest from clubs not only from domestic, but also clubs from abroad like Standard Liège and Club Brugge.

=== Hapoel Tel Aviv ===
After three years with Maccabi Netanya on 23 July 2009, he moved for $500,000 to Hapoel Tel Aviv where he played until 2011.

He scored on his debut with Hapoel Tel Aviv in UEFA Europa League 3–1 win against IFK Göteborg in the third qualifying round. He made his league debut for the club, on the opening game of the season, in a goalless draw against Beitar Jerusalem. One month later, on 21 September 2009, he scored his first goal for the club, in a 2–1 loss against Maccabi Haifa; followed up with his second and third goal on 4 October 2009, in a 3–0 win against his former club, Maccabi Netanya. In the Europa League group-stage match, he scored two goals and provided two assist in two consecutive games against Hamburger SV and Rapid Wien. Since in his first season, he scored in consecutive games, at least three times. He also scored a hat-trick, in a 7–1 win over Hapoel Petah Tikva on 21 November 2009. His season ended in positive with the club when the club won the league.

On 18 August 2010, Shechter made headlines during a UEFA Champions League playoff match against Red Bull Salzburg in Austria, when he celebrated a goal by pulling a crocheted Hapoel Tel Aviv kippah from his sock and placing it on his head. The display earned him a yellow card and garnered attention in Israel, where the gesture was widely interpreted as a triumphant gesture against the Nazi history of Austria's past. This interpretation was questioned when it was discovered that the head covering was given to him by a cancer patient and Hapoel Tel Aviv fan. On 20 October 2010, Shechter scored his first Champions League goal, in a 3–1 loss against Schalke 04. Soon after that, Shechter's playing time significantly decreased, due to injuries; the first being his thigh muscle in late August; his second another thigh muscle in October; his third a dislocated shoulder and the last was another dislocated shoulder, which ruled him out for the rest of the season, during a match against Hapoel Acre.

In December 2010, Italian side Chievo wanted to sign Shechter on loan, with an option to buy the player. Among those who tried to sign him were Celtic, but the move was soon pulled.

=== 1. FC Kaiserslautern ===
On 7 July 2011, Shechter's transfer to 1. FC Kaiserslautern from the Bundesliga was completed. The fee was €2,500,000 and he signed a four-year contract with the club, where he was soon joined with compatriot Gil Vermouth. He made his debut for the club, on the opening game of the season, in a 2–0 loss against Werder Bremen. Then, the next game, he scored his first goal for the club, in a 1–1 draw against Augsburg. However, later in the season, he soon struggled to score goals, having only scored four times in all competitions and it went worse when he lost his first team place, due to a suspension against Hannover 96 on 18 December 2011, causing him to miss two games. Another is suffering two injuries: calf muscle strain and muscular problems. After a 4–0 loss against Mainz, Shechter was subjected to anti-Semitic insults, which caused nationwide outrage and condemnation. At the end of the season, the club was relegated.

=== Swansea City ===
On 15 August 2012, Swansea City of the English Premier League signed Shechter on a one-year loan deal from Kaiserslautern. After being included in the bench as an unused substitute against Sunderland on 1 September, he made his debut for the club two weeks later, coming on as a substitute for Leon Britton in the 79th minute of a 2–0 defeat at Aston Villa. On 3 November, he contributed an assist for Pablo Hernández, in a 1–1 draw against Chelsea.

Shechter was an unused substitute on 24 February 2013 as Swansea won the League Cup with a 5–0 win over Bradford City in the final at Wembley Stadium. On 7 May, he scored his first Premier League goal and the only goal of his loan, in a 3–2 win over Wigan Athletic at the DW Stadium. At the end of the season, Shechter paid tribute to the club for treating him very well. However, upon making his return to the club, Shechter revealed he was never part of the squad at Swansea City.

=== Return to Hapoel Tel Aviv ===
On 13 June 2013, Shechter returned to Hapoel Tel Aviv, exactly two years after he left for Kaiserslautern. Hapoel had to pay Kaiserslautern a mere €500,000 transfer fee, €2 million less than what the German club paid for his services just two years before. He previously went to training with the club in February after being barred from going to Dubai, due to United Arab Emirates’ policy on visits by Israelis.

=== Nantes and Maccabi Haifa ===
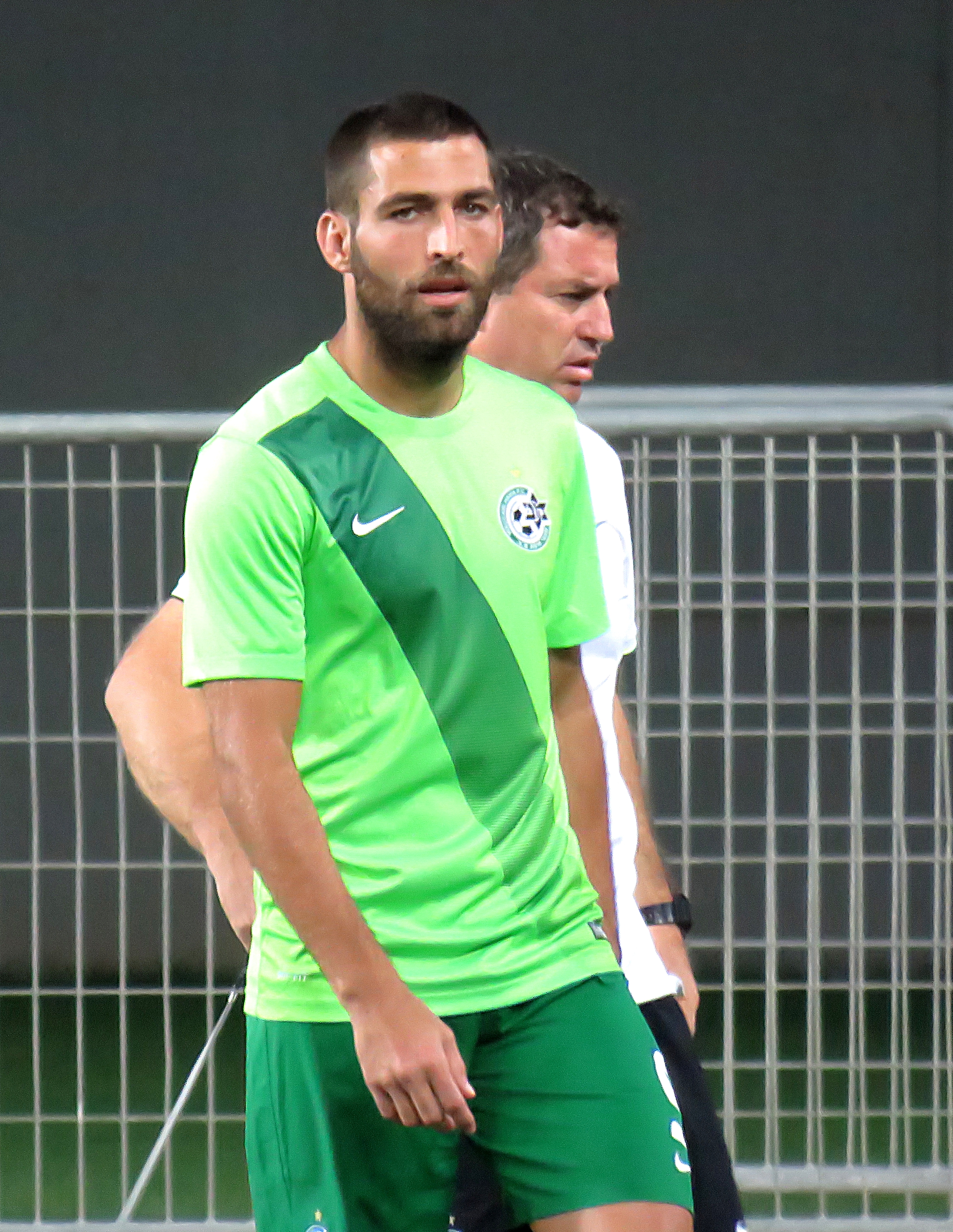
Shechter playing for Maccabi Haifa in 2015

On 30 January 2014 he was loaned to Nantes, joining the French club on a permanent basis on 22 May, on a two-year deal. During his time at the club he scored twice in a 4–0 Coupe de la Ligue win over Laval in October, and his only Ligue 1 goal came the previous month to decide a 2–1 home win over Nice; however, on 2 February 2015 he returned to Israel and signed a 4 years deal with Maccabi Haifa.

=== Beitar Jerusalem ===
On 22 January 2016, Shechter he was loaned to Beitar Jerusalem after scoring only one goal this term for Maccabi Haifa. On 22 May 2018, Shechter left Beitar Jerusalem.

=== Maccabi Tel Aviv ===
On 24 May 2018, Shechter signed to Israeli Premier League club Maccabi Tel Aviv.

=== Hapoel Be'er Sheva ===
On 20 June 2021, Shechter signed for Hapoel Be'er Sheva.

=== Hapoel Petah Tikva ===
On 19 June 2023 signed for Hapoel Petah Tikva.

== International career ==
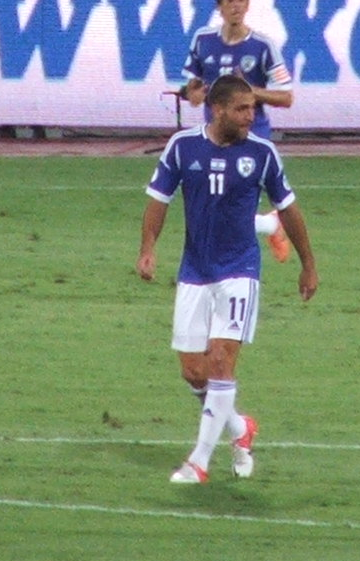
Shechter playing for Israel in 2012

He participated in the Valeri Lobanovsky Memorial Tournament 2007, where he scored 2 goals as the top scorer and brought victory to his team.

On 3 March 2010 he made his debut in the victory match against Romania.

On 10 August 2011, scored his first goal for the national team after coming on as a substitute in the match against Cote d'Ivoire.

== Personal life ==
Following a win against IFK Göteborg in the Europa League in 2009, Shechter, along with Brazilian teammate Douglas da Silva, was arrested at Gothenburg airport over rape allegations, but was soon released from custody. The prosecutor allowed the pair to go as there was no evidence to justify keeping them in jail. Prosecutors then dropped charges against Shechter, while Douglas' case continued. Eventually, police soon dropped the charges against the pair.

== Career statistics ==
=== Club ===
As of 1 June 2023

Appearances and goals by club, season and competition
Season	Club	League		National cup		League cup		Europe		Total	
Season	Club	Apps	Goals	Apps	Goals	Apps	Goals	Apps	Goals	Apps	Goals
Hapoel Nazareth Illit	2005–06	26	3	0	0	8	1	–		34	4
Maccabi Netanya	2006–07	30	7	1	0	8	0	2	0	41	7
Maccabi Netanya	2007–08	24	7	4	2	3	0	2	0	33	9
Maccabi Netanya	2008–09	29	7	4	0	3	0	2	0	38	7
Hapoel Tel Aviv	2009–10	34	22	5	4	2	2	11	3	52	31
Hapoel Tel Aviv	2010–11	11	4	0	0	3	0	9	3	23	7
1. FC Kaiserslautern	2011–12	23	3	3	1	–		–		26	4
Swansea City (loan)	2012–13	18	1	1	0	1	0	–		20	1
Hapoel Tel Aviv	2013–14	16	7	1	0	0	0	4	1	21	8
Nantes (loan)	2013–14	11	0	0	0	1	0	–		12	0
Nantes	2014–15	12	1	0	0	1	2	–		13	3
Maccabi Haifa	2014–15	14	2	–		–		–		14	2
Maccabi Haifa	2015–16	10	0	0	0	5	0	–		15	0
Beitar Jerusalem	2015–16	16	3	0	0	–		–		16	3
Beitar Jerusalem	2016–17	34	14	5	4	2	0	8	1	49	19
Beitar Jerusalem	2017–18	30	9	4	0	3	2	4	0	41	11
Maccabi Tel Aviv	2018–19	34	8	3	0	3	0	3	0	43	8
Maccabi Tel Aviv	2019–20	32	6	1	0	1	0	4	0	38	6
Maccabi Tel Aviv	2020–21	29	4	4	2	1	0	8	0	42	6
Hapoel Be'er Sheva	2021–22	23	2	4	1	2	0	4	1	33	4
Hapoel Be'er Sheva	2022–23	18	1	0	0	1	0	3	1	22	2
Hapoel Petah Tikva	2023–24	0	0	0	0	0	0	0	0	0	0
Career total		474	111	40	14	48	7	64	10	626	142

=== International ===
Scores and results list Israel's goal tally first, score column indicates score after each Shechter goal.

List of international goals scored by Itay Shechter
No.	Date	Venue	Opponent	Score	Result	Competition
1	9 October 2010	Ramat Gan Stadium	Croatia	1–2	1–2	UEFA Euro 2012 qualifying
2	12 October 2010	Karaiskakis Stadium	Greece	1–2	1–2	UEFA Euro 2012 qualifying
3	10 August 2011	Stade de Genève	Ivory Coast	3–4	3–4	Friendly
4	26 May 2012	UPC-Arena	Czech Republic	1–2	1–2	Friendly
5	7 September 2013	Ramat Gan Stadium	Azerbaijan	1–1	1–1	2014 FIFA World Cup qualification (UEFA)

== Honours ==
Hapoel Tel-Aviv

- Premier League: 2009–10
- State Cup: 2009–10, 2010–11

Swansea City

- Football League Cup: 2012–13

Maccabi Tel Aviv

- Premier League: 2018–19, 2019-20
- State Cup: 2020–21
- Toto Cup: 2018–19, 2020-21
- Super Cup: 2019, 2020

Hapoel Be'er Sheva

- State Cup: 2021–22
- Super Cup: 2022
