= Chikeluba Ofoedu =

Nigerian footballer

Chico
Personal information
- Full name: Chikeluba Francis Ofoedu
- Date of birth: 12 November 1992 (age 33)
- Place of birth: Enugu, Nigeria
- Height: 1.73 m (5 ft 8 in)
- Position: Striker

Team information
- Current team: Hapoel Ashdod

Youth career
- Enugu Rangers

Senior career*
Years	Team	Apps	(Gls)
2011–2012	Enugu Rangers		(11)
2012–2013	1461 Trabzon	25	(7)
2013–2014	Karşıyaka	40	(12)
2014–2016	Samsunspor	49	(20)
2016–2018	Eskişehirspor	58	(19)
2018–2020	Maccabi Tel Aviv	48	(14)
2021–2022	Sagan Tosu	12	(8)
2022	Adoration		
2022	Hapoel Ashdod	11	(0)
- * Club domestic league appearances and goals

Chikeluba Francis "Chico" Ofoedu // (born 12 November 1992) is a Nigerian football forward who plays for Hapoel Ashdod.

== Club career ==
=== Enugu Rangers ===
Ofoedu scored 12 goals for Nigeria Premier League team Enugu Rangers in the 2012 season.

=== 1461 Trabzon ===
On the summer of 2012, Chico joined 1461 Trabzon on a season-long loan deal. He played a total of 33 games while scoring 8 goals and assisting 3 goals.

=== Karsiyaka ===
His impressive performance during his loan spell at 1461 Trabzon saw him join Karsiyaka the following season.

=== Samsunspor ===
In January 2015, he joined Samsunspor as a free agent. He went on to score a total of 21 goals in 49 games while providing 8 assists.

=== Eskisehirspor ===
He joined Eskisehirspor in the summer of 2016. He played an important role in his first season in the team as they finished third in the Turkey 1. Lig which has been their best position in recent years. His outstanding form in the following season made him a top priority for the Israeli club, Maccabi Tel Aviv.

=== Maccabi Tel Aviv ===
On 17 July 2018, Maccabi Tel Aviv announced his signing on a 2-year deal. He scored his debut goal for the club on 19 August 2018 in their 4-1 win against Hapoel Tel Aviv in the Toto League Cup semi final. They were crowned Israeli champions during his two years' spell at the club.

=== Sagan Tosu ===
On January 20, 2021, Sagan Tosu announced his signing from Maccabi Tel Aviv. His debut goal for the club came in a League Cup match against Kashima Antlers on April 29, 2021. He got his league debut on 24 July 2021.

== Honours ==
=== Club ===
Maccabi Tel Aviv

- Israeli Premier League: 2018–19, 2019–20
- Toto Cup: 2018–19
