= Maor Kandil =

Israeli footballer

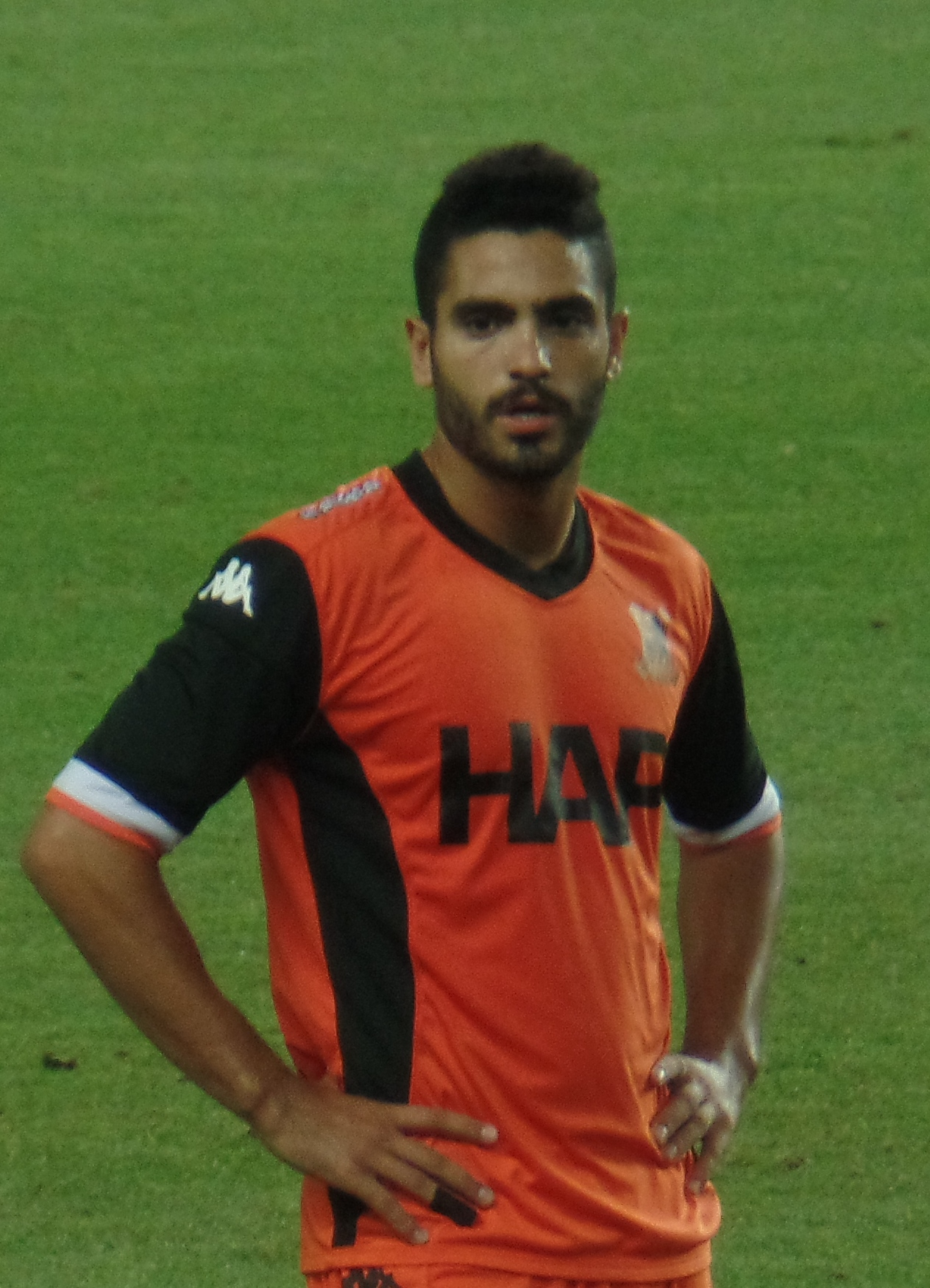
- Kandil with Bnei Yehuda in 2018

Personal information
- Date of birth: 27 November 1993 (age 32)
- Place of birth: Tel Aviv, Israel
- Height: 1.78 m (5 ft 10 in)
- Position: Right back

Youth career
- 2003–2005: Shimshon Tel Aviv
- 2005–2008: Bnei Yehuda
- 2008–2011: Shimshon Tel Aviv
- 2011: Hapoel Tel Aviv
- 2011–2013: Bnei Yehuda

Senior career*
| Years | Team | Apps | (Gls) |
| 2010 | Beitar Shimshon Tel Aviv | 0 | (0) |
| 2013–2018 | Bnei Yehuda | 60 | (3) |
| 2013–2014 | → Maccabi Kabilio Jaffa (loan) | 26 | (2) |
| 2014–2015 | → Hapoel Ramat HaSharon (loan) | 37 | (1) |
| 2018–2023 | Maccabi Tel Aviv | 61 | (4) |
| 2023–2025 | Maccabi Haifa | 25 | (1) |
| 2025–2026 | Bnei Yehuda Tel Aviv | 13 | (0) |

International career
| 2020 | Israel | 1 | (0) |
- * Club domestic league appearances and goals

Maor Kandil (Hebrew: מאור קנדיל; born 27 November 1993) is an Israeli former footballer.

== Early life ==
Kandil was born in Tel Aviv, Israel, to a Sephardic Jewish family from Morocco.

== Club career ==
He made his Israeli Premier League debut for Bnei Yehuda Tel Aviv on 22 August 2015, in a game against Maccabi Haifa.

== Honours ==
Bnei Yehuda

- Israel State Cup (1): 2016–17

Maccabi Tel Aviv

- Israeli Premier League (2): 2018–19, 2019-20
- Israel State Cup (1): 2020–21
- Toto Cup (2): 2018–19, 2020-21
- Israel Super Cup (2): 2019, 2020

Maccabi Haifa

- Israel Super Cup (1): 2023
