= Ofir Davidzada =

Israeli footballer

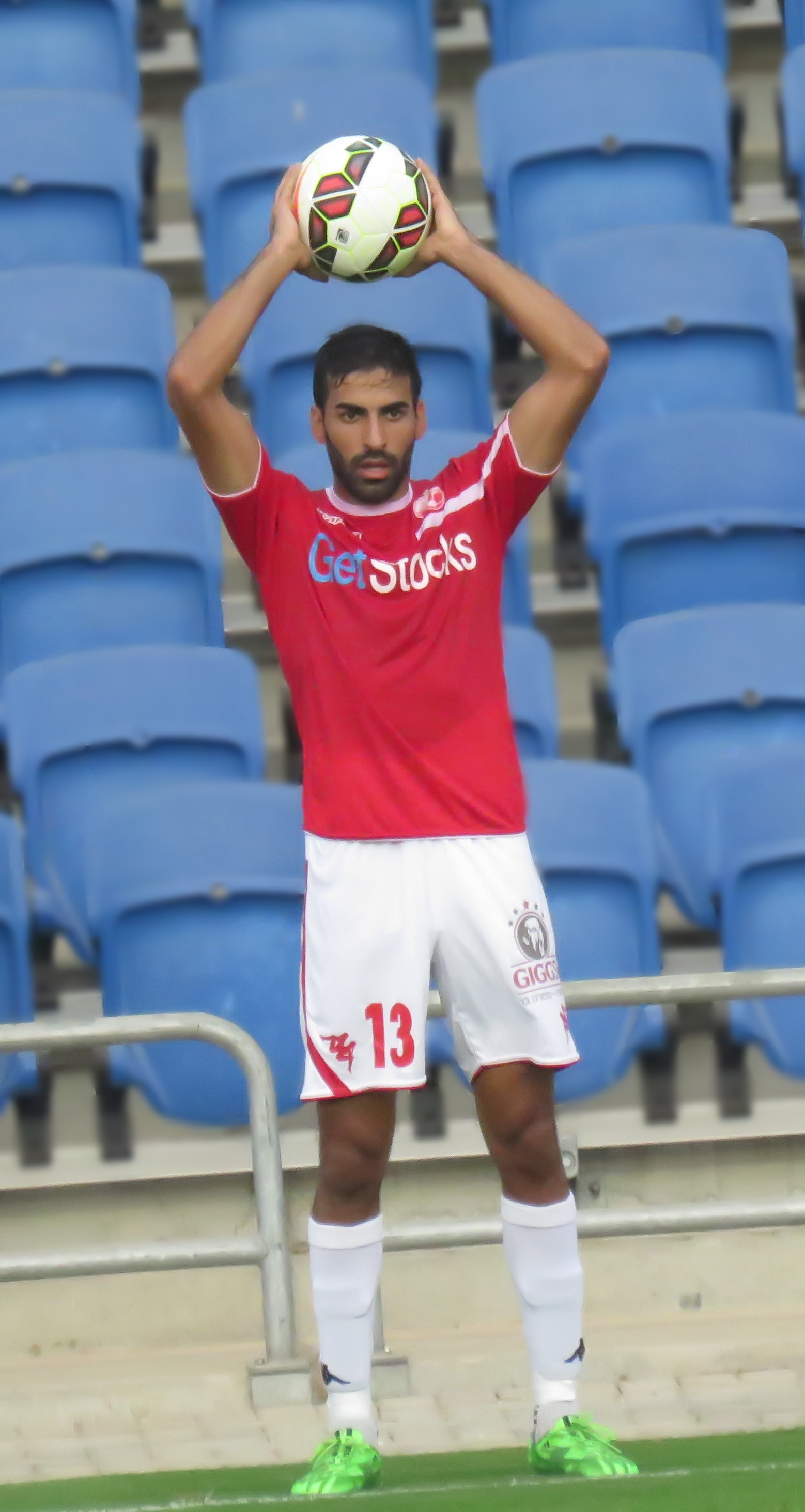
- Davidzada playing for Hapoel Be'er Sheva in 2015

Personal information
- Full name: Ofir Davidzada
- Date of birth: 5 May 1991 (age 35)
- Place of birth: Be'er Sheva, Israel
- Height: 1.78 m (5 ft 10 in)
- Position: Left-back

Team information
- Current team: Hapoel Be'er Sheva
- Number: 13

Youth career
- 2003–2010: Hapoel Be'er Sheva

Senior career*
Years	Team	Apps	(Gls)
2010–2016	Hapoel Be'er Sheva	185	(1)
2016–2018	Gent	3	(0)
2017–2018	→ Maccabi Tel Aviv	30	(3)
2018–2025	Maccabi Tel Aviv	126	(1)
2025–	Hapoel Be'er Sheva	18	(2)

International career^{‡}
2010–2013	Israel U21	13	(0)
2013–	Israel	16	(0)
- * Club domestic league appearances and goals as of 15:46, 29 May 2026 (UTC) ‡ National team caps and goals as of 15:46, 29 May 2026 (UTC)

Ofir Davidzada (or Davidadze, Hebrew: אופיר דוידזאדה; born 5 May 1991) is an Israeli professional footballer who plays as an left-back for Israeli Premier League club Hapoel Be'er Sheva and the Israel national team.

== Early life ==
Davidzada was born in Be'er Sheva, Israel, to a Sephardic Jewish family.

== Club career ==
=== Hapoel Be'er Sheva ===
He made his debut for Hapoel Be'er Sheva against Maccabi Haifa in February 2010. He established himself in the team during the 2010–11 season.

=== Gent ===
On 5 August 2016, it was announced that Davidzada has signed a four-season contract with K.A.A. Gent and would join the team after Hapoel Be'er Sheva's Champions League qualifying play-off matches against Scottish Champions Celtic.

=== Maccabi Tel Aviv ===
On 7 September 2018, Davidzada signed a four-year deal with Maccabi Tel Aviv.

=== The return to Hapoel Be'er Sheva ===
On 21 June 2025, Davidzada signed with Hapoel Be'er Sheva on a one-year contract with an option for an additional season. Davidzada made his second debut for Hapoel Be'er Sheva in a 2–1 victory over Maccabi Tel Aviv at Bloomfield Stadium in the 2025 Israel Super Cup. However, he and his team were eliminated from European competitions after being knocked out by the Bulgarian side Levski Sofia in the UEFA Europa League path and by AEK Athens from Greece in the UEFA Conference League. In addition, he and his team lost 2–0 to Hapoel Tel Aviv in the Toto Cup semi-final at Turner Stadium. On 24 August, Davidzada made his renewed Israeli Premier League debut in a 4–2 victory over Maccabi Netanya at the Netanya Stadium. On 4 October, Davidzada scored his first Israeli Premier League goal since returning to Hapoel Be'er Sheva in a 2–1 victory over Hapoel Tel Aviv at Turner Stadium.

== International career ==
Davidzada was called up to represent Israel at under-21 level. He took part in the 2013 UEFA European Under-21 Football Championship.

== Honours ==
Hapoel Be'er Sheva

- Israeli Premier League (2): 2015–16, 2025–26
- Israel Super Cup (1): 2025

Maccabi Tel Aviv

- Israeli Premier League (4): 2018–19, 2019–20, 2023–24, 2024–25
- Israel State Cup (1): 2020–21
- Toto Cup (5): 2017–18, 2018–19, 2020–21, 2023–24, 2024–25
- Israel Super Cup (3): 2019, 2020, 2024

== See also ==
- List of Jewish footballers
- List of Jews in sports
- List of Israelis
