= Yonatan Cohen =

Israeli footballer (born 1996)

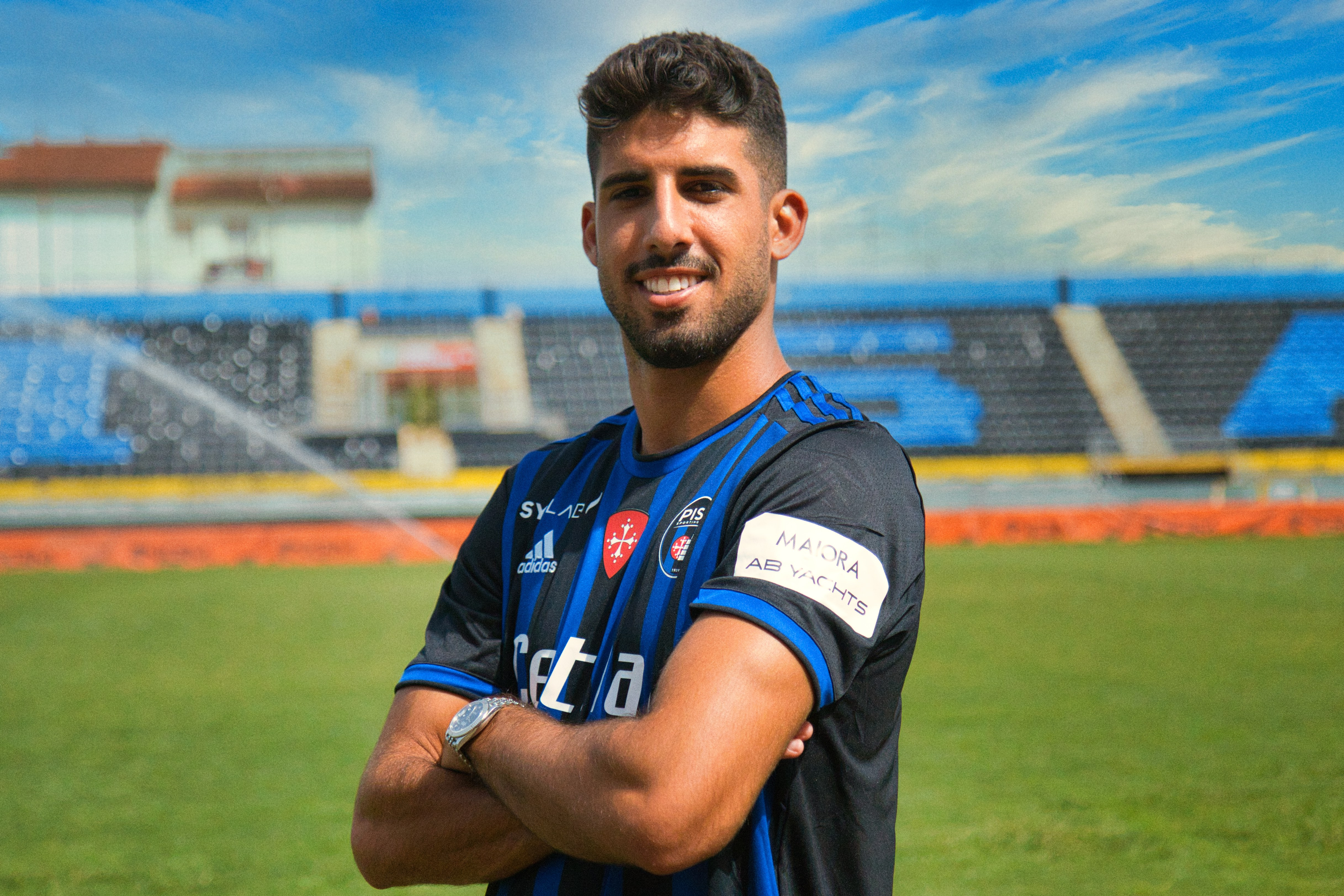
- Cohen with Pisa in 2021

Personal information
- Date of birth: 29 June 1996 (age 30)
- Place of birth: Tel Aviv, Israel
- Height: 1.86 m (6 ft 1 in)
- Positions: Attacking midfielder; forward

Team information
- Current team: Bangkok United

Youth career
- 2005–2009: Maccabi Tel Aviv
- 2009–2010: Hapoel Tel Aviv
- 2010–2015: Maccabi Tel Aviv

Senior career*
Years	Team	Apps	(Gls)
2015–2021	Maccabi Tel Aviv	76	(28)
2015–2016	→ Beitar Tel Aviv Ramla (loan)	31	(11)
2016–2018	→ Bnei Yehuda Tel Aviv (loan)	61	(10)
2021–2023	Pisa	26	(4)
2022–2023	→ Maccabi Tel Aviv (loan)	14	(1)
2023–2024	Maccabi Tel Aviv	15	(1)
2024–2025	Melbourne City	19	(6)
2025–2026	Hapoel Petah Tikva	21	(4)
2026–	Bangkok United	0	(0)

International career^{‡}
2014	Israel U19	1	(0)
2015–2018	Israel U21	7	(2)
2019–	Israel	8	(0)
- * Club domestic league appearances and goals as of 23 June 2026 ‡ National team caps and goals as of 26 March 2022

Yonatan Cohen (Hebrew: יונתן כהן; born 29 June 1996) is an Israeli professional footballer who plays as an attacking midfielder or as a forward for Thai League 1 club Bangkok United and the Israel national team.

== Early life ==
Cohen was born in Tel Aviv, Israel, to a family of Ashkenazi Jewish (Polish-Jewish) descent. His older brother Guy Cohen is also a footballer, and his father Mickey Cohen is an Israeli retired footballer who played for Maccabi Tel Aviv as well.

He also holds a Polish passport, on account of his Ashkenazi Jewish descent, which eases the move to certain European football leagues.

== Club career ==
=== Maccabi Tel Aviv ===
Cohen began playing youth football for Maccabi Tel aviv before going on loans to Beitar Tel Aviv Ramla and to Bnei Yehuda Tel Aviv. Then-manager Arik Benado brought Cohen to Bnei Yehuda Tel Aviv, where he made his senior debut in the Israeli Premier League. Cohen became an important player for Bnei Yehuda Tel Aviv during the 2016–17 season, relegating previously established midfielders Pedro Joaquín Galván and Amir Agayev to the bench.

=== Pisa ===
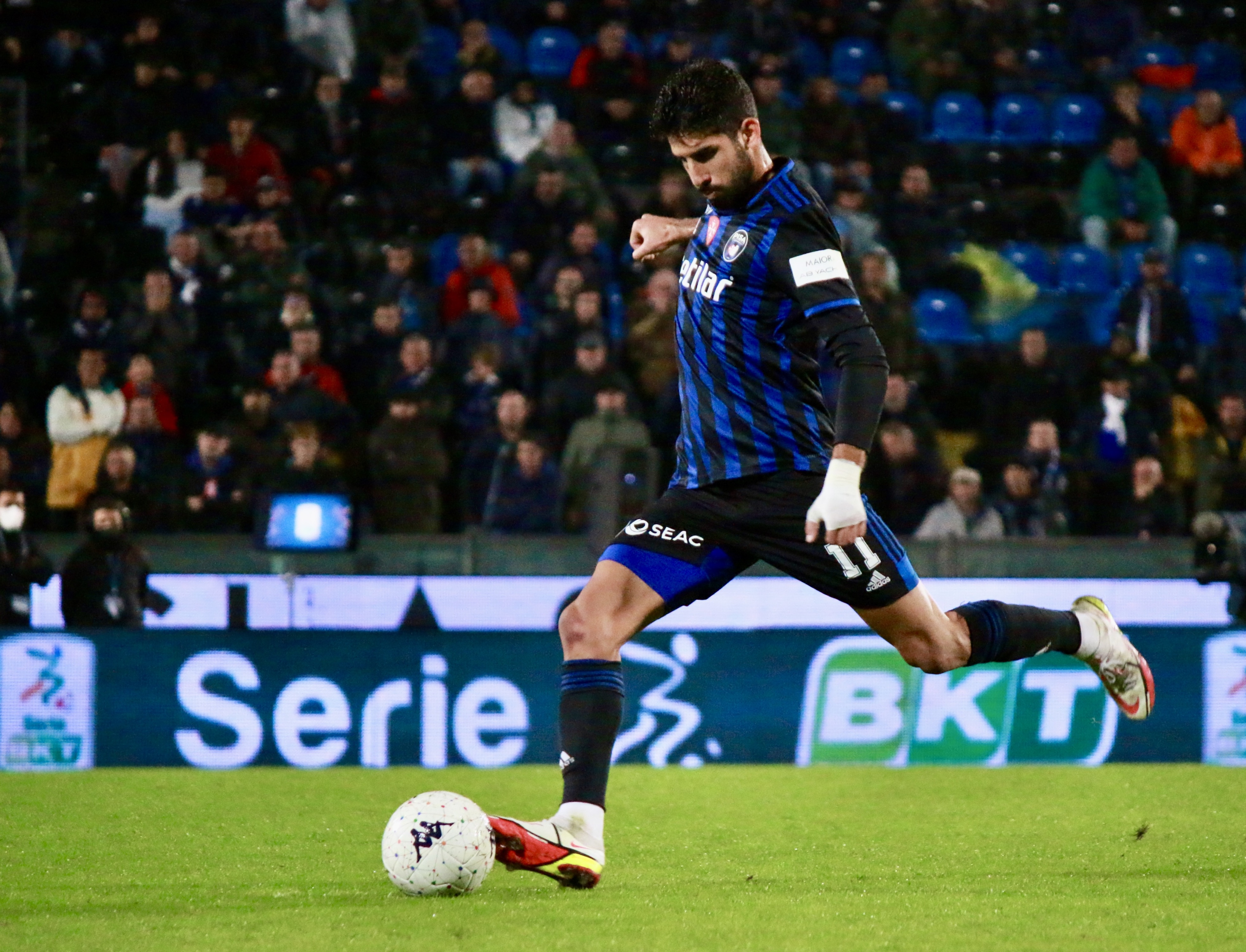
Cohen playing for Pisa in 2021

In August 2021, Cohen has moved to Pisa SC in the Italian Serie B having made his debut against Alessandria in Day 2, and scoring his first goal during the following fixture vs Ternana on 11 September.

=== Return to Maccabi Tel Aviv ===
On 29 September 2022, Pisa announced Cohen's return to Maccabi Tel Aviv. The transfer was initially a loan, at the end of the loan term Maccabi was obligated to purchase his rights.

=== Melbourne City ===
Cohen moved to the A-League for the 2024–25 season, signing with Australian club Melbourne City FC. Cohen scored Melbourne City's only and winning goal in the 2025 A-League Grand Final, securing their second championship win over cross-town rivals Melbourne Victory.

== International career ==
Cohen made his debut for the senior Israel national team on 21 March 2019 in a UEFA Euro 2020 qualifier against Slovenia.

== Career statistics ==
=== Club ===
As of match played 3 May 2025

Appearances and goals by club, season and competition
Club	Season	League			Cup		League cup		Continental		Other		Total	
Club	Season	Division	Apps	Goals	Apps	Goals	Apps	Goals	Apps	Goals	Apps	Goals	Apps	Goals
Maccabi Tel Aviv	2017–18	Israeli Premier League	—		—		—		2	0	—		2	0
Maccabi Tel Aviv	2018–19	Israeli Premier League	22	6	5	5	2	2	1	0	—		30	13
Maccabi Tel Aviv	2019–20	Israeli Premier League	33	12	1	0	2	0	4	1	1	0	41	13
Maccabi Tel Aviv	2020–21	Israeli Premier League	21	10	3	1	0	0	7	2	2	1	33	14
Maccabi Tel Aviv	2021–22	Israeli Premier League	—		—		—		2	0	1	0	3	0
Maccabi Tel Aviv	Total		76	28	9	6	4	2	16	3	4	1	109	40
Beitar Tel Aviv Ramla (loan)	2015–16	Liga Leumit	31	11	4	0	—		—		—		35	11
Bnei Yehuda Tel Aviv (loan)	2016–17	Israeli Premier League	27	4	6	4	4	0	—		—		37	8
Bnei Yehuda Tel Aviv (loan)	2017–18	Israeli Premier League	34	7	1	0	2	0	—		—		37	7
Bnei Yehuda Tel Aviv (loan)	Total		61	11	7	4	6	0	—		—		74	15
Pisa	2021–22	Serie B	25	4	0	0	—		—		1	0	26	4
Pisa	2022–23	Serie B	1	0	0	0	—		—		—		1	0
Pisa	Total		26	4	0	0	—		—		1	0	27	4
Maccabi Tel Aviv (loan)	2022–23	Israeli Premier League	14	1	3	0	1	0	—		—		18	1
Maccabi Tel Aviv	2023–24	Israeli Premier League	15	1	2	0	2	3	9	1	—		28	5
Maccabi Tel Aviv	Total		29	2	5	0	3	3	9	1	—		46	6
Melbourne City	2024–25	A-League Men	19	6	—		—		—		—		19	6
Career Total			242	62	25	10	16	5	25	4	5	1	313	82

=== International ===
As of match played 26 March 2022

Appearances and goals by national team and year
National team	Year	Apps	Goals
Israel	2019	4	0
Israel	2020	0	0
Israel	2021	3	0
Israel	2022	1	0
Total		8	0

== Honours ==
Bnei Yehuda Tel Aviv

- Israeli State Cup: 2016–17

Maccabi Tel Aviv

- Israeli Premier League: 2018–19, 2019–20, 2023–24
- Israeli State Cup: 2020–21
- Toto Cup: 2018–19, 2020–21
- Israel Super Cup: 2024

Melbourne City

- A-League: 2024–25

Individual

- Israeli Premier League top assist provider: 2019–20 (11 assists)

== See also ==
- List of Jewish footballers
- List of Jews in sports
