= Jair Amador =

Association football player (born 1989)

Personal information
- Full name: Jair Amador Silos
- Date of birth: 21 August 1989 (age 37)
- Place of birth: São Jorge de Arroios, Portugal
- Height: 1.90 m (6 ft 3 in)
- Position: Centre-back

Team information
- Current team: Eibar
- Number: 15

Youth career
- La Cruz Villanovense

Senior career*
| Years | Team | Apps | (Gls) |
| 2008–2015 | Villanovense | 68 | (4) |
| 2008–2010 | → Hernán Cortés (loan) | | |
| 2011–2013 | → Miajadas (loan) | 79 | (6) |
| 2015–2016 | Levante B | 36 | (0) |
| 2016–2018 | Huesca | 72 | (4) |
| 2018–2020 | Maccabi Tel Aviv | 53 | (0) |
| 2020–2025 | Zaragoza | 160 | (8) |
| 2025– | Eibar | 21 | (0) |
- * Club domestic league appearances and goals as of 6 June 2026

Jair Amador Silos (born 21 August 1989), also simply known as Jair, is a Portuguese professional footballer who plays as a centre-back for Spanish club SD Eibar. Born in Portugal, he holds Spanish citizenship.

== Club career ==
=== Early career ===
Born in São Jorge de Arroios, Lisbon, Jair never knew his parents (who were Cape Verdian) and was adopted by a Spanish family, moving to Villanueva de la Serena, Badajoz, Extremadura afterwards. A UD La Cruz Villanovense youth graduate, he made his debut as a senior with CD Hernán Cortés in 2008, on loan from CF Villanovense.

Jair appeared rarely for Villanovense in 2010–11, and was loaned to CD Miajadas in Tercera División in the 2011 summer. He remained with the side for two years, being brought back to his parent club in July 2013 after it was relegated from Segunda División B.

Jair was a regular starter during the 2013–14 campaign, as the club returned to the third level at first attempt. On 6 July 2015 he signed for Levante UD, being assigned to the reserves also in the third division.

=== Huesca ===
On 24 June 2016, Jair signed a two-year contract with Segunda División club SD Huesca. He made his professional debut on 20 August, starting in a 0–0 away draw against AD Alcorcón.

Jair scored his first professional goal on 2 December 2017, netting his team's second in a 3–1 home win against Córdoba CF. He finished the campaign as an undisputed starter, featuring in all league matches and scoring four goals as his side achieved a first-ever promotion to La Liga.

=== Maccabi Tel Aviv ===
On 7 June 2018, Jair signed a three-year contract with Israeli Premier League side Maccabi Tel Aviv FC. In his first season, he helped the club win a domestic double, but only featured regularly in his second, as his side retained the league trophy.

=== Zaragoza ===
On 19 August 2020, Jair returned to Spain and its second division, after agreeing to a two-year deal with Real Zaragoza. On 20 June 2025, after losing his starting spot during the season, he left the club.

=== Eibar ===
On 22 July 2025, Jair moved to fellow league team SD Eibar on a one-year contract.

== Honours ==
Maccabi Tel Aviv

- Israeli Premier League: 2018–19, 2019–20
- Toto Cup: 2018–19
