= 2024–25 Maccabi Tel Aviv F.C. season =

Maccabi Tel Aviv
2024–25 season
- Chairman: Mitchell Goldhar
- Manager: Žarko Lazetić
- Stadium: Bloomfield Stadium
- Premier League: 1st (champions)
- State Cup: Round of 16
- Toto Cup: Winners
- Super Cup: Winners
- Champions League: Second qualifying round
- Europa League: League phase
- Top goalscorer: League: Dor Turgeman (15); All: Dor Turgeman (19)
- Average home league attendance: 20,442
Home colours	Away colours	Third colours

The 2024–25 season is Maccabi Tel Aviv's 118th season since its establishment in 1906 and 77th since the establishment of the State of Israel. During the 2024–25 campaign, the club will compete in the Israeli Premier League, State Cup, Toto Cup and UEFA Champions League.

On 7 June 2024, Robbie Keane announced that he will not continue as the manager of Maccabi for 2024–25. Žarko Lazetić was announced as the new Manager on 24 June.

On 31 July, Maccabi lost in the second qualifying round of the UEFA Champions League and moved to the UEFA Europa League's third qualifying round. On 29 August, Maccabi qualified to League phase.

On 25 December 2024, Maccabi won the Toto Cup title after beating Maccabi Haifa at Netanya Stadium.

On 24 May 2025, Maccabi won the Israeli Premier League, making it Maccabi's 26th Israeli title.

== Season squad ==
As of 11 September 2024

No.	Pos.	Nation	Player
2	DF	ISR	Avishay Cohen
3	DF	ISR	Roy Revivo
4	DF	ISR	Stav Lemkin
5	DF	ISR	Idan Nachmias
6	DF	NED	Tyrese Asante
7	FW	ISR	Eran Zahavi
9	FW	ISR	Dor Turgeman
13	DF	ISR	Raz Shlomo
14	MF	NED	Joris van Overeem
15	FW	ISR	Yonas Malede
16	MF	ISR	Gabi Kanichowsky
17	FW	BRA	Weslley Patati
18	DF	SRB	Nemanja Stojić

No.	Pos.	Nation	Player
19	FW	ISR	Elad Madmon
20	FW	GHA	Henry Addo
22	GK	ISR	Ofek Melika
23	GK	CRO	Simon Sluga
27	DF	ISR	Ofir Davidzada
28	MF	MLI	Issouf Sissokho
29	MF	ISR	Sagiv Yehezkel
33	FW	ISR	Hisham Layous
36	MF	ISR	Ido Shahar
42	MF	ISR	Dor Peretz
73	DF	ISR	Daniel Tishler
77	MF	ISR	Osher Davida
90	GK	ISR	Roi Mishpati

=== Internationals ===
Only up to six non-Israeli nationals can be in an Israeli club squad . Those with Jewish ancestry, married to an Israeli or have played in Israel for an extended period of time, can claim a passport or permanent residency which would allow them to play with Israeli status.

- (Ghana) Henry Addo
- (Netherlands) Tyrese Asante
- (Mali) Issouf Sissokho
- (Serbia) Nemanja Stojić
- (Brazil) Weslley Patati
- (Croatia) Simon Sluga

== Transfers ==
=== In ===
Date	Pos.	No.	Player	Transferred from	Fee	Ref
22 May 2024	GK	22	(Israel) Ofek Melika	(Israel) Maccabi Petah Tikva	Free Transfer	
1 June 2024	FW	19	(Israel) Elad Madmon	(Israel) Hapoel Hadera	Loan Return	
8 July 2024	DF	6	(Netherlands) Tyrese Asante	(Netherlands) Den Haag	€500,000	
22 July 2024	MF	29	(Israel) Sagiv Yehezkel	(Turkey) Antalyaspor	Free Transfer	
1 August 2024	FW	33	(Israel) Hisham Layous	(Israel) Hapoel Tel Aviv	€900,000	
4 August 2024	MF	28	(Mali) Issouf Sissokho	(France) Bordeaux	Free Transfer	
26 August 2024	DF	18	(Serbia) Nemanja Stojić	(Serbia) Red Star Belgrade	€1,200,000	
4 September 2024	FW	17	(Brazil) Weslley Patati	(Brazil) Santos	€1,450,000	
4 September 2024	DF	4	(Israel) Stav Lemkin	(Ukraine) Shakhtar Donetsk	Loan	
17 October 2024	GK	23	(Croatia) Simon Sluga	(Bulgaria) Ludogorets	Free Transfer	

=== Out ===
Date	Pos.	No.	Player	To club	Fee	Ref
31 May 2024	DF	21	(Israel) Sheran Yeini	—	Retired	
31 May 2024	DF	4	(Spain) Enric Saborit	(Turkey) Gaziantep	Released	
31 May 2024	MF	23	(Israel) Eyal Golasa	(Israel) Maccabi Petah Tikva	Released	
5 June 2024	DF	25	(Netherlands) Derrick Luckassen	(Cyprus) Pafos	Released	
5 June 2024	GK	22	(Panama) Orlando Mosquera	(Saudi Arabia) Al-Fayha	Released	
5 June 2024	GK	19	(Israel) Daniel Tenenbaum	(Israel) Ironi Tiberias	Released	
4 July 2024	MF	70	(Portugal) Kiko Bondoso	(Portugal) Rio Ave	Loan	
26 July 2024	MF	17	(Angola) Felício Milson	(Serbia) Red Star Belgrade	€4,500,000	
21 August 2024	FW	77	(Israel) Matan Hozez	(Israel) Hapoel Jerusalem	Released	
11 September 2024	DF	30	(Israel) Matan Baltaxa	(Israel) Hapoel Be'er Sheva	Released	
16 September 2024	MF	11	(Israel) Yonatan Cohen	(Australia) Melbourne City	Released	
18 September 2024	MF	10	(Israel) Dan Biton	(Israel) Hapoel Be'er Sheva	Released	
8 January 2025	DF	55	(Israel) Nir Biton	(Israel) F.C. Ashdod	Released	

== Pre-season and friendlies ==
Win Draw Loss Fixtures

3 July 2024 Friendly	Ruch Chorzów (Poland)	0–5	(Israel) Maccabi Tel Aviv	Poland

6 July 2024 Friendly	Raków Częstochowa (Poland)	0–0	(Israel) Maccabi Tel Aviv	Poland

9 July 2024 Friendly	AC Omonia (Cyprus)	0–2	(Israel) Maccabi Tel Aviv	Poland

== Competitions ==
=== Overall record ===
Competition	First match	Last match	Starting round	Final position	Record							
Competition	First match	Last match	Starting round	Final position	Pld	W	D	L	GF	GA	GD	Win %
Premier League	24 August 2024	24 May 2025	Matchday 1	Winners	36	24	8	4	86	36	+50	66.67
State Cup	28 December 2024	15 January 2025	8th round	Round of 16	2	1	0	1	4	2	+2	50.00
Toto Cup	15 July 2024	25 December 2024	Israel Super Cup	Winners	3	3	0	0	7	2	+5	100.00
European Competitions	23 July 2024	30 January 2025	2nd qualifying round	League phase	14	6	1	7	22	11	+11	42.86
Total					55	34	9	12	119	51	+68	61.82

Source: Maccabi Tel Aviv Website

== Israeli Premier League ==
=== Regular season ===
==== Regular season table ====
Pos	Team	Pld	W	D	L	GF	GA	GD	Pts	Qualification
1	Hapoel Be'er Sheva	26	18	6	2	52	18	+34	58 (Note: Hapoel Be'er Sheva had 2 points deducted following riot in Bnei Sakhnin match.)	Qualification for the Championship round
2	Maccabi Tel Aviv	26	17	6	3	56	27	+29	57	Qualification for the Championship round
3	Maccabi Haifa	26	14	6	6	54	32	+22	47 (Note: Maccabi Haifa had 1 point deducted following riot in Maccabi Tel Aviv match.)	Qualification for the Championship round
4	Beitar Jerusalem	26	13	7	6	48	34	+14	46	Qualification for the Championship round
5	Hapoel Haifa	26	12	5	9	39	31	+8	41	Qualification for the Championship round

Source: Soccerway, One
Rules for classification: 1) Points; 2) Goal difference; 3) Matches won; 4) Goals scored; 5) Head-to-head points; 6) Head-to-head goal difference; 7) Head-to-head goals scored; 8) Play-off.

==== Regular season matches ====
Win Draw Loss Fixtures

1 September 2024 2	Maccabi Petah Tikva	0–3	Maccabi Tel Aviv	Petah Tikva
20:15		Report	Kanichowsky 31'; Layous 42'; Shlomo 66'	Stadium: HaMoshava Stadium; Attendance: 9,505; Referee: Snir Levi

14 September 2024 3	Maccabi Tel Aviv	1–0	Hapoel Be'er Sheva	Tel Aviv
20:30	Turgeman 44'	Report		Stadium: Bloomfield Stadium; Attendance: 25,032; Referee: Guy Laibuvitz

18 September 2024 1	Maccabi Tel Aviv	2–1	Hapoel Jerusalem	Tel Aviv
17:30	Revivo 38'; Davida 90+3'	Report	Yao (red card) 56'; Laish 84'	Stadium: Bloomfield Stadium; Attendance: 18,267; Referee: David Fuxman

22 September 2024 4	F.C. Ashdod	0–2	Maccabi Tel Aviv	Ashdod
20:15		Report	Turgeman 27'; Stojić 36'	Stadium: Yud-Alef Stadium; Attendance: 5,149; Referee: Aviad Shiloah

29 September 2024 5	Maccabi Tel Aviv	1–1	Ironi Tiberias	Tel Aviv
20:30	Nachmias 31'	Report	Shapso 66'	Stadium: Bloomfield Stadium; Attendance: 0 (Note: Played Behind closed doors due to the September 2024 Israeli attacks against Lebanon); Referee: Yigal Frid

6 October 2024 6	Maccabi Netanya	1–2	Maccabi Tel Aviv	Netanya
20:30	Nachmias 49' (o.g.)	Report	Zahavi 12' (pen.); Madmon 90+1' (pen.)	Stadium: Netanya Stadium; Attendance: 1,624; Referee: Gal Leibovitz

19 October 2024 7	Maccabi Tel Aviv	2–0	Maccabi Haifa	Jerusalem (Note: due to the September 2024 Israeli attacks against Lebanon the Home Front Command was limited the number of attendance in Tel Aviv)
20:30	Kanichowsky 18'; Madmon 23'	Report		Stadium: Teddy Stadium; Attendance: 19,880; Referee: Orel Grinfeld

28 October 2024 8	Beitar Jerusalem	3–1	Maccabi Tel Aviv	Jerusalem
20:30	Marcelin (red card) 45+3'; Muzie 48'; Shua 82' (pen.); Kani 86'	Report	Turgeman 36'	Stadium: Teddy Stadium; Attendance: 25,000; Referee: Snir Levi

2 November 2024 9	Maccabi Tel Aviv	0–1	Ironi Kiryat Shmona	Be'er Sheva
17:30		Report	Abu Rumi 81'	Stadium: Turner Stadium; Attendance: 10,345; Referee: Gal Levi

10 November 2024 10	Bnei Sakhnin	0–4	Maccabi Tel Aviv	Acre
20:15		Report	Patati 23'; Turgeman 29'; Addo 48'; Materazzi 71'	Stadium: Acre Municipal Stadium; Attendance: 0 Referee: Yigal Frid

2 December 2024 11	Maccabi Bnei Reineh	1–2	Maccabi Tel Aviv	Nof HaGalil
20:00	Henty 31'	Report	Jehezkel 53' (pen.); Turgeman 58'	Stadium: Green Stadium; Attendance: 4,034; Referee: David Fuxman

5 December 2024 12	Maccabi Tel Aviv	2–2	Hapoel Hadera	Tel Aviv
20:00	Zahavi 8'; Shahar 40'; Sissokho (red card) 83'	Report	Donyoh 27'; Avramov 90+11'	Stadium: Bloomfield Stadium; Attendance: 20,649; Referee: Idan Layba

8 December 2024 13	Hapoel Haifa	1–1	Maccabi Tel Aviv	Haifa
20:15	Melamed 60' (pen.)	Report	Patati 24'	Stadium: Sammy Ofer Stadium; Attendance: 6,270; Referee: Orel Grinfeld

16 December 2024 14	Hapoel Jerusalem	2–3	Maccabi Tel Aviv	Jerusalem
20:30	Hozez 50'; Diallo 90+1'	Report	van Overeem 36'; Jehezkel 65' (pen.); Peretz 69'	Stadium: Teddy Stadium; Attendance: 6,234; Referee: Sapir Berman

21 December 2024 15	Maccabi Tel Aviv	3–2	Maccabi Petah Tikva	Tel Aviv
15:00	Peretz 45', 63'; Patati 61'	Report	Damașcan 4', 30'	Stadium: Bloomfield Stadium; Attendance: 20,026; Referee: Ohad Asulin

1 January 2025 16	Hapoel Be'er Sheva	2–2	Maccabi Tel Aviv	Be'er Sheva
20:30	Kangwa 61'; Turgeman 90+1'	Report	Yehezkel 73'; Patati 76'	Stadium: Turner Stadium; Attendance: 15,231; Referee: Gal Leibovitz

4 January 2025 17	Maccabi Tel Aviv	5–1	F.C. Ashdod	Tel Aviv
17:30	Peretz 59', 81'; Zahavi 65'; Davida 74'; Turgeman 90+1'	Report	Levy 31'	Stadium: Bloomfield Stadium; Attendance: 20,874; Referee: Igal Frid

11 January 2025 18	Ironi Tiberias	2–2	Maccabi Tel Aviv	Nof HaGalil
19:30	Zarora 52'; Shapso 90'	Report	Turgeman 45' (pen.); Stojić 47'	Stadium: Green Stadium; Attendance: 4,100; Referee: Dekel Zino

18 January 2025 19	Maccabi Tel Aviv	4–1	Maccabi Netanya	Tel Aviv
20:00	Turgeman 22' (pen.), 36'; Patati 35' (pen.); Zahavi 83'	Report	Mensa 77'	Stadium: Bloomfield Stadium; Attendance: 20,080; Referee: Orel Grinfeld

27 January 2025 20	Maccabi Haifa	0–3 w/o	Maccabi Tel Aviv	Haifa
20:30		Report		Stadium: Sammy Ofer Stadium; Attendance: 28,997; Referee: Igal Frid; Assistant referees: Matityahu Yacobov; Idan Berenstein; Fourth official: David Fuxman
Note: Maccabi Tel Aviv won 3-0 by w/o due attendance riot

3 February 2025 21	Maccabi Tel Aviv	1–1	Beitar Jerusalem	Tel Aviv
20:30	Nachmias 80'	Report	Soro 72'	Stadium: Bloomfield Stadium; Attendance: 27,625; Referee: Snir Levi

9 February 2025 22	Ironi Kiryat Shmona	1–2	Maccabi Tel Aviv	Netanya
20:15	Stephens 68'	Report	Stojić 51', 74'	Stadium: Netanya Stadium; Attendance: 5,927; Referee: Sapir Berman

16 February 2025 23	Maccabi Tel Aviv	3–1	Bnei Sakhnin	Tel Aviv
20:15	Nachmias (red card) 42'; Patati 63', 84'; Turgeman 87'	Report	Halaihal 80'	Stadium: Bloomfield Stadium; Attendance: 19,625; Referee: Gal Leibovich

22 February 2025 24	Maccabi Tel Aviv	0–1	Maccabi Bnei Reineh	Tel Aviv
17:30		Report	Altman 9'	Stadium: Bloomfield Stadium; Attendance: 15,664; Referee: Orel Grinfeld

1 March 2025 25	Hapoel Hadera	2–3	Maccabi Tel Aviv	Netanya
19:30	Eissat 13'; Adeniyi 25'; Eissat (red card) 82'	Report	Davida 36'; Peretz 65'; Turgeman 85' (pen.)	Stadium: Netanya Stadium; Attendance: 6,545; Referee: Ohad Asulin

8 March 2025 26	Maccabi Tel Aviv	2–0	Hapoel Haifa	Tel Aviv
19:30	Turgeman 45' (pen.); Peretz 75'	Report		Stadium: Bloomfield Stadium; Attendance: 22,633; Referee: David Fuxman

=== Championship round ===
==== Championship round table ====
Pos	Team	Pld	W	D	L	GF	GA	GD	Pts	Qualification	MTA	HBS	MHA	BEI	HHA	MNE
1	Maccabi Tel Aviv (C)	36	24	8	4	86	36	+50	80	Qualification for the Champions League second qualifying round	—	1–1	1–1	5–0	3–0	4–1
2	Hapoel Be'er Sheva	36	24	8	4	75	28	+47	78 (Note: Hapoel Be'er Sheva had 2 points deducted following riot in Bnei Sakhnin match.)	Qualification for the Europa League first qualifying round (Note: Hapoel Be'er Sheva qualified for the Europa League first qualifying round as the 2024–25 Israel State Cup winners; the second Conference League spot was passed to the fourth-placed team.)	1–3	—	4–1	3–1	5–0	2–0
3	Maccabi Haifa	36	18	8	10	68	54	+14	61 (Note: Maccabi Haifa had 1 point deducted following riot in Maccabi Tel Aviv match.)	Qualification for the Conference League second qualifying round	0–3	0–3	—	3–3	1–5	1–0
4	Beitar Jerusalem	36	15	9	12	58	54	+4	53 (Note: Beitar Jerusalem had 1 point deducted following riot in Maccabi Haifa match.)	Qualification for the Conference League second qualifying round	3–1	1–1	1–2	—	0–1	0–3
5	Hapoel Haifa	36	15	7	14	51	50	+1	52		1–3	1–2	0–2	1–0	—	1–1
6	Maccabi Netanya	36	13	6	17	51	58	−7	45		1–6	2–1	2–3	0–1	2–2	—

Source: Soccerway
Legend: Blue = home team win; Yellow = draw; Red = away team win.
Rules for classification: 1) Points; 2) Goal difference; 3) Matches won; 4) Goals scored; 5) Head-to-head points; 6) Head-to-head goal difference; 7) Head-to-head goals scored; 8) Play-off.
(C) Champions

==== Championship round matches ====
15 March 2025 27	Maccabi Tel Aviv	3–0	Hapoel Haifa	Tel Aviv
19:30	Davida 7'; Revivo 35'; Shahar 60'	Report	Diarra (red card) 45'; Salou (red card) 47'	Stadium: Bloomfield Stadium; Attendance: 20,230; Referee: Sapir Berman

31 March 2025 28	Hapoel Be'er Sheva	1–3	Maccabi Tel Aviv	Be’er Sheva
20:30	Mizrahi (red card) 23'; Kangwa 49'	Report	Patati 11', 45+1'; Peretz 32'	Stadium: Turner Stadium; Attendance: 15,764; Referee: Orel Grinfeld

5 April 2025 29	Maccabi Tel Aviv	4–1	Maccabi Netanya	Tel Aviv
20:00	Davida 7'; Zahavi 13', 33'; Turgeman 69' (pen.)	Report	Ben Shabat 22'	Stadium: Bloomfield Stadium; Attendance: 23,415; Referee: Igal Frid

14 April 2025 30	Maccabi Tel Aviv	1–1	Maccabi Haifa	Tel Aviv
20:30	Zahavi 51'	Report	Severina 59'	Stadium: Bloomfield Stadium; Attendance: 28,429; Referee: Guy Laibuvitz

21 April 2025 31	Beitar Jerusalem	3–1	Maccabi Tel Aviv	Jerusalem
20:30	George 53'; Marcelin 66'; Levi 90+7'	Report	Davida 84'	Stadium: Teddy Stadium; Attendance: 25,550; Referee: Igal Frid

26 April 2025 32	Hapoel Haifa	1–3	Maccabi Tel Aviv	Haifa
20:30	Hugi 9'	Report	Patati 22'; Peretz 61', 64'	Stadium: Sammy Ofer Stadium; Attendance: 7,490; Referee: David Fuxman

5 May 2025 33	Maccabi Tel Aviv	1–1	Hapoel Be'er Sheva	Tel Aviv
20:30	Eliasi 33' (o.g.)	Report	Biton 12'	Stadium: Bloomfield Stadium; Attendance: 27,063; Referee: Gal Leibovitz

12 May 2025 34	Maccabi Netanya	1–6	Maccabi Tel Aviv	Netanya
20:30	Vargas 30'	Report	Zahavi 10', 52', 70'; Turgeman 38' (pen.); Davida 50'; Stojić 90+4'	Stadium: Netanya Stadium; Attendance: 11,733; Referee: Igal Frid; Assistant referees: Omer Barbiro; Orphaz Chai Chen; Fourth official: Ohad Asulin

19 May 2025 35	Maccabi Haifa	0–3	Maccabi Tel Aviv	Haifa
20:30	Seck (red card) 82'	Report	Patati 23'; Davida 52'; Shahar 88'	Stadium: Sammy Ofer Stadium; Attendance: 27,843; Referee: Orel Grinfeld

24 May 2025 36	Maccabi Tel Aviv	5–0	Beitar Jerusalem	Tel Aviv
20:30	Peretz 8'; Zahavi 18', 61'; Marcelin 56' (o.g.); Turgeman 79'	Report		Stadium: Bloomfield Stadium; Attendance: 28,108; Referee: Orel Grinfeld

=== Results overview ===
Win Draw Loss

Opposition	Regular season		Championship round	
Opposition	Home score	Away score	Home score	Away score
Beitar Jerusalem	1–1	1–3	5–0	1–3
Bnei Sakhnin	3–1	4–0	—N/a	
F.C. Ashdod	5–1	2–0	—N/a	
Hapoel Be'er Sheva	1–0	2–2	1–1	3–1
Hapoel Hadera	2–2	3–2	—N/a	
Hapoel Haifa	2–0	1–1	3–0	3–1
Hapoel Jerusalem	2–1	3–2	—N/a	
Ironi Kiryat Shmona	0–1	2–1	—N/a	
Ironi Tiberias	1–1	2–2	—N/a	
Maccabi Bnei Reineh	0–1	2–1	—N/a	
Maccabi Haifa	2–0	3–0	1–1	3–0
Maccabi Netanya	4–1	2–1	4–1	1–6
Maccabi Petah Tikva	3–2	3–0	—N/a	

=== Average Home attendance ===
Game 5 is excluded because no spectators were allowed. (Note: Played Behind closed doors due to the September 2024 Israeli attacks against Lebanon)

Home Game No.	Attendance
1	18,267
3	25,032
7	19,880 (Note: due to the September 2024 Israeli attacks against Lebanon the Home Front Command was limited the number of attendance in Tel Aviv)
9	10,345
12	20,649
15	20,026
17	20,874
19	20,080
21	27,625
23	19,625
24	15,664
26	22,633
27	20,230
29	23,415
30	28,429
33	27,063
36	28,108
Average	21,642

== Israel State Cup ==
28 December 2024 Eighth round	Maccabi Tel Aviv	3–0	Hapoel Jerusalem	Tel Aviv
20:00	Zahavi 48'; Madmon 50'; Davida 70'	Report		Stadium: Bloomfield Stadium; Attendance: 15,447; Referee: Orel Grinfeld

15 January 2025 Round of 16	Maccabi Tel Aviv	1–2	Maccabi Bnei Reineh	Tel Aviv
20:30	Shahar 47'	Report	49' (o.g.) Madmon; 90+1' Henty	Stadium: Bloomfield Stadium; Attendance: 7,896; Referee: Yoav Mizrahi; Assistant referees: Idan Yarkoni; Toval Koltonof; Fourth official: Sapir Berman

== Israel Super Cup ==
15 July 2024	Maccabi Tel Aviv	2–0	Maccabi Petah Tikva	Tel Aviv
20:00	Zahavi 14'; Hozez 90+4'	Report		Stadium: Bloomfield Stadium; Attendance: 16,789; Referee: Orel Grinfeld

Maccabi Tel Aviv advanced to the semi-finals stage of the 2024–25 Toto Cup Al.

== Toto Cup Al ==
Win Draw Loss Fixtures

18 August 2024 Semi-finals	Maccabi Tel Aviv	2–1	Bnei Sakhnin	Tel Aviv
20:00	Zehavi 84' (pen.); Davida 90+4'	Report	Ben Hamo (red card) 90+1'; Khlaikhal 90+6'	Stadium: Bloomfield Stadium; Attendance: 9,682; Referee: Orel Grinfeld

25 December 2024 Final	Maccabi Tel Aviv	3–1	Maccabi Haifa	Netanya
20:00	Patati 62'; Peretz 67', 77'	Report	David 29'	Stadium: Netanya Stadium; Attendance: 13,016; Referee: Snir Levi

== UEFA Champions League ==
Win Draw Loss Fixtures

=== Second qualifying round ===
23 July 2024 Q2 — 1st leg	FCSB (Romania)	1–1	(Israel) Maccabi Tel Aviv	Bucharest, Romania
20:30 (IST)	Dawa 76'	Report	Biton 71'	Stadium: Arena Națională; Referee: Gergo Bogár, Hungary

31 July 2024 Q2 — 2nd leg	Maccabi Tel Aviv (Israel)	0–1 (1–2 agg.)	(Romania) FCSB	Budapest, Hungary (Note: Due to the Gaza war, Maccabi Tel Aviv play their remaining home matches at a neutral venue.)
21:00 (IST)		Report	Baeten 90'	Stadium: Bozsik Aréna; Referee: Jérémie Pignard, France

== UEFA Europa League ==
Win Draw Loss Fixtures

=== Third qualifying round – Champions Path ===
6 August 2024 Q3 — 1st leg	FK Panevėžys (Lithuania)	1–2	(Israel) Maccabi Tel Aviv	Vilnius, Lithuania
19:30	Gussiås 70'	Report	Peretz 3'; Turgeman 10'	Stadium: LFF Stadium; Referee: Aliyar Aghayev, Azerbaijan

15 August 2024 Q3 — 2nd leg	Maccabi Tel Aviv (Israel)	3–0 (5–1 agg.)	(Lithuania) FK Panevėžys	Szombathely, Hungary
21:30	Peretz 45+3'; Davida 54'; Jehezkel 70'	Report		Stadium: Haladás Stadium; Referee: Nick Walsh, Scotland

=== Play-off round ===
22 August 2024 PO — 1st leg	Maccabi Tel Aviv (Israel)	3–0	(Serbia) FK TSC	Szombathely, Hungary
	Turgeman 27'; Peretz 63'; Madmon 83'	Report	Đorđević (red card) 41'; Banjac (red card) 45+2'	Stadium: Haladás Stadium; Referee: Sebastian Gishamer, Austria

29 August 2024 PO — 2nd leg	FK TSC (Serbia)	1–5 (1–8 agg.)	(Israel) Maccabi Tel Aviv	Bačka Topola, Serbia
	Mboungou 90+2'	Report	Addo 2', 6'; Asante 12'; Turgeman 56'; Shahar 89'	Stadium: TSC Arena; Referee: João Pinheiro, Portugal

=== League phase ===
Pos	Team	Pld	W	D	L	GF	GA	GD	Pts
27	(German Football Association) TSG Hoffenheim	8	2	3	3	11	14	−3	9
28	(Turkish Football Federation) Beşiktaş	8	3	0	5	10	15	−5	9
29	(Israel Football Association) Maccabi Tel Aviv	8	2	0	6	8	17	−9	6
30	(Football Association of the Czech Republic) Slavia Prague	8	1	2	5	7	11	−4	5
31	(Swedish Football Association) Malmö FF	8	1	2	5	10	17	−7	5

Source: UEFA
Rules for classification: League phase tiebreakers

26 September 2024 1	Braga (Portugal)	2–1	(Israel) Maccabi Tel Aviv	Braga, Portogal
21:00 (20:00 UTC+1)	Bruma 88', 90+5'		Davida 30' (pen.); Kanichowsky (red card) 90+8'; Asante (red card) 90+9'	Stadium: Estádio Municipal

3 October 2024 2	Maccabi Tel Aviv (Israel)	0–2	(Denmark) Midtjylland	Belgrade, Serbia
18:45			Franculino 39'; Chilufya 89'	Stadium: Partizan Stadium

24 October 2024 3	Maccabi Tel Aviv (Israel)	1–2	(Spain) Real Sociedad	Belgrade, Serbia
18:45	Turgeman 81'		Pacheco 19'; Gómez 64'	Stadium: Partizan Stadium; Referee: Rohit Saggi (Norway)

7 November 2024 4	Ajax (Netherlands)	5–0	(Israel) Maccabi Tel Aviv	Amsterdam, Netherlands
21:00	Traoré 14'; Taylor 27'; Godts 39'; Brobbey 61'; Fitz-Jim 69'			Stadium: Johan Cruyff Arena; Referee: Ondřej Berka (Czech Republic)

28 November 2024 5	Beşiktaş (Turkey)	1–3	(Israel) Maccabi Tel Aviv	Debrecen, Hungary (Note: Due to a strain on Israel–Turkey relations related to the Gaza war, Turkish authorities requested the Beşiktaş v Maccabi Tel Aviv match be played outside of Turkey at a neutral venue. Therefore, Beşiktaş will play this home match at Nagyerdei Stadion, Debrecen, Hungary, instead of their regular stadium, Beşiktaş Stadium, Istanbul. Following a request from local authorities, it will also be played behind closed doors.)
18:45 (20:45 UTC+3)	Silva 38'		Kanichowsky 23'; Peretz 45+3'; Patati 80'	Stadium: Nagyerdei Stadion; Referee: Simone Sozza (Italy)

12 December 2024 6	Maccabi Tel Aviv (Israel)	2–1	(Latvia) RFS	Belgrade, Serbia
21:00	Nachmias 16'; Stojić 69'		Savalnieks 52'	Stadium: Partizan Stadium

23 January 2025 7	Bodø/Glimt (Norway)	3–1	(Israel) Maccabi Tel Aviv	Bodø, Norway
18:45	Høgh 39', 65' (pen.); Evjen 62'		Peretz 12'	Stadium: Aspmyra Stadion; Referee: Ricardo de Burgos Bengoetxea (Spain)

30 January 2025 8	Maccabi Tel Aviv (Israel)	0–1	(Portugal) Porto	Belgrade, Serbia
21:00			González 58'	Stadium: Partizan Stadium; Referee: Nikola Dabanović (Montenegro)

== Squad statistics ==
=== Goals ===
Players who left during the season are marked with (*)

Rank	Pos.	No.	Player	Premier League	State Cup	Toto Cup	Europe	Total
1	FW	9	(Israel) Dor Turgeman	15	0	0	4	19
2	MF	42	(Israel) Dor Peretz	11	0	2	5	18
3	FW	7	(Israel) Eran Zahavi	12	1	2	0	15
4	MF	17	(Brazil) Weslley Patati	11	0	1	1	13
5	MF	77	(Israel) Osher Davida	8	1	1	2	12
6	DF	25	(Serbia) Nemanja Stojić	5	0	0	1	6
7	DF	26	(Israel) Ido Shahar	3	1	0	1	5
8	MF	29	(Israel) Sagiv Yehezkel	3	0	0	1	4
8	MF	19	(Israel) Elad Madmon	2	1	0	1	4
10	MF	16	(Israel) Gabi Kanichowsky	2	0	0	1	3
10	DF	5	(Israel) Idan Nachmias	2	0	0	1	3
10	MF	20	(Mali) Henry Addo	1	0	0	2	3
13	MF	14	(Netherlands) Joris van Overeem	2	0	0	0	2
13	DF	3	(Israel) Roy Revivo	2	0	0	0	2
15	FW	15	(Israel) Hisham Layous	1	0	0	0	1
15	DF	13	(Israel) Raz Shlomo	1	0	0	0	1
15	DF	77	(Israel) Matan Hozez*	0	0	1	0	1
15	DF	6	(Netherlands) Tyrese Asante	0	0	0	1	1
15	DF	10	(Israel) Dan Biton*	0	0	0	1	1
Own goals				2	0	0	0	2
Awarded				3	0	0	0	3
Total				86	4	7	22	119

=== Clean sheets ===
Rank	Pos.	No.	Player	Premier League	State Cup	Toto Cup	Europe	Total
1	MF	90	(Israel) Roi Mashpati	5	0	1	2	8
2	MF	23	(Croatia) Simon Sluga	4	1	0	0	5
Total				9	1	1	2	13
