= 2025–26 Maccabi Tel Aviv F.C. season =

Maccabi Tel Aviv
2025–26 season
- Chairman: Mitchell Goldhar
- Manager: Žarko Lazetić
- Stadium: Bloomfield Stadium
- Premier League: 3rd
- State Cup: Winners
- Toto Cup: 5th
- Super Cup: Runners-up
- Champions League: Second qualifying round
- Europa League: League phase
- Top goalscorer: League: Dor Peretz (19); All: Dor Peretz (22)
- Average home league attendance: 22,116
Home colours	Away colours	Third colours

The 2025–26 season was Maccabi Tel Aviv's 119th season since its establishment in 1906 and 78th since the establishment of the State of Israel. During the 2025–26 campaign, the club competed in the Israeli Premier League, State Cup, Toto Cup, Super Cup, UEFA Champions League and UEFA Europa League.

== Season squad ==
As of 23 September 2025

No.	Pos.	Nation	Player
1	GK	ISR	Yoav Gerafi
2	DF	ISR	Avishay Cohen
3	DF	ISR	Roy Revivo (Vice-captain)
4	DF	BRA	Heitor
5	DF	GUI	Ali Camara
6	DF	NED	Tyrese Asante
10	MF	VEN	Kervin Andrade
11	MF	ISR	Sagiv Yehezkel (3rd captain)
13	DF	ISR	Raz Shlomo
14	DF	ISR	Denny Gropper
15	FW	ISR	Yonas Malede
17	MF	SRB	Kristijan Belic
19	FW	ISR	Elad Madmon
21	DF	ISR	Noam Ben Harush

No.	Pos.	Nation	Player
22	GK	ISR	Ofek Melika
23	MF	ISR	Ben Lederman
28	MF	MLI	Issouf Sissokho
29	FW	CPV	Hélio Varela
30	MF	ISR	Itamar Noy
34	FW	ISR	Saied Abu Farchi
36	MF	ISR	Ido Shahar
41	DF	ISR	Itay Ben Hamo
42	MF	ISR	Dor Peretz (Captain)
51	GK	ISR	Shalev Saadya
77	MF	ISR	Osher Davida
90	GK	ISR	Roi Mishpati
98	FW	MDA	Ion Nicolaescu

=== Internationals ===
Only up to eight non-Israeli nationals can be in an Israeli club squad . Those with Jewish ancestry, married to an Israeli or have played in Israel for an extended period of time, can claim a passport or permanent residency which would allow them to play with Israeli status.

- (Cape Verde) Hélio Varela
- (Netherlands) Tyrese Asante
- (Mali) Issouf Sissokho
- (Serbia) Kristijan Belic
- (Venezuela) Kervin Andrade
- (Moldova) Ion Nicolaescu
- (Brazil) Heitor
- (Guinea) Ali Camara

== Transfers ==
=== In ===
Date	Pos.	No.	Player	Transferred from	Fee	Ref
30 May 2025	MF	23	(Israel) Ben Lederman	(Poland) Raków Częstochowa	Free Transfer	
1 June 2025	DF	21	(Israel) Noam Ben Harush	(Israel) Hapoel Haifa	€1,000,000	
1 June 2025	MF	30	(Israel) Itamar Noy	(Israel) Hapoel Haifa	Free Transfer	
1 June 2025	GK	1	(Israel) Yoav Gerafi	(Israel) Hapoel Haifa	Free Transfer	
25 June 2025	FW	98	(Moldova) Ion Nicolaescu	(Netherlands) Heerenveen	€1,300,000	
26 June 2025	DF	14	(Israel) Denny Gropper	(Bulgaria) Ludogorets	Free Transfer	
15 July 2025	DF	4	(Brazil) Heitor	(Hungary) Győri	€850,000	
17 July 2025	DF	5	(Guinea) Ali Camara	(Switzerland) Young Boys	€500,000	
10 August 2025	MF	17	(Serbia) Kristijan Belic	(Netherlands) AZ Alkmaar	Loan	
1 September 2025	MF	10	(Venezuela) Kervin Andrade	(Brazil) Fortaleza	€1,800,000	
4 September 2025	FW	29	(Cape Verde) Hélio Varela	(Belgium) Gent	€1,700,000	

=== Out ===
Date	Pos.	No.	Player	To club	Fee	Ref
31 May 2025	FW	7	(Israel) Eran Zahavi	—	End of Contract	
31 May 2025	MF	14	(Netherlands) Joris van Overeem	(Netherlands) Heerenveen	End of Contract	
31 May 2025	GK	23	(Croatia) Simon Sluga	(Slovenia) Celje	End of Contract	
31 May 2025	DF	4	(Israel) Stav Lemkin	(Netherlands) Twente	End of Loan	
31 May 2025	DF	5	(Israel) Idan Nachmias	(Bulgaria) Ludogorets	End of Contract	
21 June 2025	DF	27	(Israel) Ofir Davidzada	(Israel) Hapoel Be'er Sheva	End of Contract	
20 July 2025	MF	16	(Israel) Gabi Kanichowsky	(Hungary) Ferencváros	End of Contract	
23 July 2025	MF	33	(Israel) Hisham Layous	(Greece) Levadiakos	Loan	
21 August 2025	FW	9	(Israel) Dor Turgeman	(United States) New England Revolution	€4,700,000	
29 August 2025	MF	10	(Brazil) Weslley Patati	(Netherlands) AZ Alkmaar	€7,300,000	
1 September 2025	DF	26	(Serbia) Nemanja Stojić	(Russia) Sochi	€1,200,000	
21 September 2025	MF	27	(Israel) Ori Azo	(Israel) F.C. Ashdod	Loan	

== Israeli Premier League ==
=== Regular season ===
==== Regular season table ====
Pos	Team	Pld	W	D	L	GF	GA	GD	Pts	Qualification
1	Hapoel Be'er Sheva	26	18	5	3	58	25	+33	59	Qualification for the Championship round
2	Beitar Jerusalem	26	17	6	3	61	29	+32	57	Qualification for the Championship round
3	Maccabi Tel Aviv	26	14	7	5	55	32	+23	49	Qualification for the Championship round
4	Hapoel Tel Aviv	26	15	6	5	46	26	+20	49 (Note: Hapoel Tel Aviv had 2 points deducted following riot in Maccabi Tel Aviv match.)	Qualification for the Championship round
5	Maccabi Haifa	26	11	9	6	50	28	+22	42	Qualification for the Championship round

Source: Soccerway
Rules for classification: 1) Points; 2) Goal difference; 3) Matches won; 4) Goals scored; 5) Head-to-head points; 6) Head-to-head goal difference; 7) Head-to-head goals scored; 8) Play-off.

==== Regular season matches ====
Win Draw Loss Fixtures

31 August 2025 2	Maccabi Tel Aviv	4–0	Maccabi Netanya	Tel Aviv
20:00	Peretz 20', 61'; Nicolaescu 22'; Noy 71'	Report		Stadium: Bloomfield Stadium; Attendance: 21,753; Referee: Ohad Asulin

13 September 2025 3	Ironi Tiberias	1–4	Maccabi Tel Aviv	Nof HaGalil
20:00	Bilenkyi 9'	Report	Shahar 29'; Jehezkel 36' (pen.); Nicolaescu 45'; Peretz 59' (pen.)	Stadium: Green Stadium; Attendance: 4,221; Referee: Orel Grinfeld

16 September 2025 1	Hapoel Petah Tikva	0–4	Maccabi Tel Aviv	Petah Tikva
19:30		Report	Davida 19'; Peretz 56', 83'; Shahar 89' (pen.)	Stadium: HaMoshava Stadium; Attendance: 9,135; Referee: Aviad Shiloah

20 September 2025 4	Maccabi Tel Aviv	2–1	Hapoel Jerusalem	Tel Aviv
20:00	Revivo (yellow card) 24' (yellow-red card) 66'; Shahar 70'; Camara 90+3'	Report	Badash 67'	Stadium: Bloomfield Stadium; Attendance: 22,478; Referee: Idan Layba

28 September 2025 5	Bnei Sakhnin	0–0	Maccabi Tel Aviv	Sakhnin
20:15	Otanga (red card); Abu Nil (yellow card) 80' (yellow-red card) 90+9'	Report		Stadium: Doha Stadium; Attendance: 2,828; Referee: Ohad Asulin

5 October 2025 6	Maccabi Tel Aviv	1–1	Maccabi Haifa	Tel Aviv
20:30	Noy 47'	Report	Jovanović 90+2' (pen.)	Stadium: Bloomfield Stadium; Attendance: 25,101; Referee: Ygal Frid

19 October 2025 7	Hapoel Tel Aviv	0–3 w/o	Maccabi Tel Aviv	Tel Aviv
20:30				Stadium: Bloomfield Stadium; Attendance: 25,753; Referee: Sapir Berman
Note: Maccabi Tel Aviv won 3-0 by w/o due attendance riot

27 October 2025 8	Maccabi Tel Aviv	3–1	Ironi Kiryat Shmona	Tel Aviv
20:00	Peretz 18'; Madmon 52' (pen.); Shahar 90+1'		Sheratzky 45'	Stadium: Bloomfield Stadium; Attendance: 22,914; Referee: Nael Oda

1 November 2025 9	Maccabi Bnei Reineh	0–2	Maccabi Tel Aviv	Nof HaGalil
19:30			Shahar 76' (pen.); Madmon 60' (pen.)	Stadium: Green Stadium; Attendance: 4,467; Referee: Gal Leibovich

9 November 2025 10	Maccabi Tel Aviv	2–6	Beitar Jerusalem	Tel Aviv
20:30	Heitor 42'; Mishpati (red card) 58'; Andrade 86'		Shua 49', 78'; Yona 51', 65'; Atzili 64' (pen.); Ben Shimol 90+4'	Stadium: Bloomfield Stadium; Attendance: 25,819; Referee: Sapir Berman

30 November 2025 11	F.C. Ashdod	2–2	Maccabi Tel Aviv	Ashdod
20:00	Batoum 40'; Diakité 90'		Shahar 76'; Abu Farchi 90+2'	Stadium: Yud-Alef Stadium; Attendance: 4,718; Referee: Gal Leibovich

3 December 2025 12	Maccabi Tel Aviv	2–1	Hapoel Haifa	Tel Aviv
20:00	Abu Farchi 67'; Peretz 70'		East 84'	Stadium: Bloomfield Stadium; Attendance: 17,493; Referee: Gal Levi

7 December 2025 13	Hapoel Be'er Sheva	1–0	Maccabi Tel Aviv	Be'er Sheva
20:30	Zlatanović 23'			Stadium: Turner Stadium; Attendance: 15,961; Referee: David Fuxman

15 December 2025 14	Maccabi Tel Aviv	2–2	Hapoel Petah Tikva	Tel Aviv
20:00	Ben Harush 62'; Shahar 90+7'		Koszta 44', 45'	Stadium: Bloomfield Stadium; Attendance: 10,114; Referee: Yoav Mizrahi

21 December 2025 15	Maccabi Netanya	1–1	Maccabi Tel Aviv	Netanya
20:15	Bilu 18'		Peretz 14'	Stadium: Netanya Stadium; Attendance: 10,344; Referee: Aviv Klain

30 December 2025 16	Maccabi Tel Aviv	1–1	Ironi Tiberias	Tel Aviv
20:00	Yehezkel 8'	Report	Gotlieb 62'	Stadium: Bloomfield Stadium; Attendance: 15,992; Referee: Snir Levi

3 January 2026 17	Hapoel Jerusalem	1–3	Maccabi Tel Aviv	Jerusalem
15:00	Ransom 19'	Report	Madmon 3'; Shahar 10' (pen.); Asante 71'	Stadium: Teddy Stadium; Attendance: 7,833; Referee: Ohad Asulin

10 January 2026 18	Maccabi Tel Aviv	1–0	Bnei Sakhnin	Tel Aviv
15:00	Shahar 77'	Report		Stadium: Bloomfield Stadium; Attendance: 19,795; Referee: Yoni Kelz

18 January 2026 19	Maccabi Haifa	4–1	Maccabi Tel Aviv	Haifa
20:30	Ohana 45+3'; Melamed 79'; Gorré 81'; Gabay 88'	Report	Jehezkel 52'	Stadium: Sammy Ofer Stadium; Attendance: 28,869; Referee: Gal Leibovich

26 January 2026 20	Maccabi Tel Aviv	1–2	Hapoel Tel Aviv	Tel Aviv
20:30	Peretz 32'		Altman 90+2'; Chico 90+4'	Stadium: Bloomfield Stadium; Attendance: 26,596; Referee: David Fuxman

2 February 2026 21	Ironi Kiryat Shmona	1–4	Maccabi Tel Aviv	Netanya
20:00				Stadium: Netanya Stadium

9 February 2026 22	Maccabi Tel Aviv	4–0	Maccabi Bnei Reineh	Tel Aviv
20:00				Stadium: Bloomfield Stadium

16 February 2026 23	Beitar Jerusalem	0–0	Maccabi Tel Aviv	Jerusalem
20:30				Stadium: Teddy Stadium

21 February 2026 24	Maccabi Tel Aviv	3–2	F.C. Ashdod	Tel Aviv
15:00				Stadium: Bloomfield Stadium

5 April 2026 25	Hapoel Haifa	1–4	Maccabi Tel Aviv	Haifa
20:15				Stadium: Sammy Ofer Stadium; Attendance: 0 (Note: Played Behind closed doors due to the 2026 Iran war); Referee: Yoav Mizrahi

12 April 2026 26	Maccabi Tel Aviv	1–3	Hapoel Be'er Sheva	Tel Aviv
20:30				Stadium: Bloomfield Stadium; Attendance: 729 (Note: due to the 2026 Iran war the Home Front Command and the Israel Football Association was limited the number of attendance to 1,000)

==== Championship round matches ====
19 April 2026 27	Maccabi Tel Aviv	1–0	Hapoel Tel Aviv	Tel Aviv
20:30				Stadium: Bloomfield Stadium; Attendance: 25,605; Referee: Ygal Frid

25 April 2026 28	Maccabi Haifa	1–3	Maccabi Tel Aviv	Haifa
20:30	Stewart (red card) 59'; Melamed 77'		14' Varela; 45+3' Abu Farchi; 83' (pen.) Shahar	Stadium: Sammy Ofer Stadium; Attendance: 24,131

28 April 2026 29	Maccabi Tel Aviv	1–0	Hapoel Be'er Sheva	Tel Aviv
19:30				Stadium: Bloomfield Stadium; Attendance: 24,069

2 May 2026 30	Beitar Jerusalem	4–2	Maccabi Tel Aviv	Jerusalem
20:30				Stadium: Teddy Stadium

5 May 2026 31	Maccabi Tel Aviv	4–0	Hapoel Petah Tikva	Tel Aviv
19:30				Stadium: Bloomfield Stadium

9 May 2026 32	Hapoel Tel Aviv	1–1	Maccabi Tel Aviv	Tel Aviv
20:30				Stadium: Bloomfield Stadium

13 May 2026 33	Maccabi Tel Aviv	3–0	Maccabi Haifa	Tel Aviv
20:30				Stadium: Bloomfield Stadium

16 May 2026 34	Maccabi Tel Aviv	1–2	Beitar Jerusalem	Tel Aviv
20:30				Stadium: Bloomfield Stadium

19 May 2026 35	Hapoel Be'er Sheva	4–2	Maccabi Tel Aviv	Be'er Sheva
20:30				Stadium: Turner Stadium

23 May 2026 36	Hapoel Petah Tikva	2–2	Maccabi Tel Aviv	Petah Tikva
18:00				Stadium: HaMoshava Stadium

== Israel State Cup ==
27 December 2025 Eighth round	Maccabi Tel Aviv	5–0	Hapoel Haifa	Tel Aviv
17:30	Varela 11'; Davida 24', 62'; Abu Farchi 30'; Shahar 51' (pen.)			Stadium: Bloomfield Stadium; Attendance: 7,605; Referee: Aviad Shiloah

14 January 2026 Round of 16	Hapoel Tel Aviv	1–1 (4–5 p)	Maccabi Tel Aviv	Tel Aviv
20:30	Turiel 53'	Report	Varela 50'; Revivo (yellow card) (red card) 65'	Stadium: Bloomfield Stadium; Referee: Sapir Berman
	Penalties
	Cohen (penalty scored); Chico (penalty scored); Loizou (penalty scored); Mahamid (penalty scored); Rotman (penalty missed); Alkukin (penalty missed)		Madmon (penalty scored); Sissokho (penalty scored); Abu Farchi (penalty scored); Camara (penalty missed); Noy (penalty scored); Hamo (penalty scored)

5 February 2026 Quarter-finals	Maccabi Jaffa	0–5	Maccabi Tel Aviv	Tel Aviv
20:30				Stadium: Bloomfield Stadium

15 April 2026 Semi-finals	Maccabi Haifa	2–3	Maccabi Tel Aviv	Jerusalem
19:45	17' Ethan Azoulay; 90+6' Silva		Peretz 14'; Asante 58'; Revivo 76'	Stadium: Teddy Stadium; Attendance: 5,000 (Note: due to the 2026 Iran war the Home Front Command and the Israel Football Association was limited the number of attendance to 5,000)

26 May 2026 Final	Hapoel Be'er Sheva	1–2	Maccabi Tel Aviv	Jerusalem
20:30	Abu Rumi 12'		Revivo 64'; Varela 58'	Stadium: Teddy Stadium

== Israel Super Cup ==
13 July 2025	Maccabi Tel Aviv	1–2	Hapoel Be'er Sheva	Tel Aviv
19:30	Patati 62'	Report	Eliel Peretz 13'; Levy (red card) 17'; Almog 77'	Stadium: Bloomfield Stadium; Attendance: 25,066; Referee: Gal Levi

== Toto Cup Al ==
Win Draw Loss Fixtures

17 August 2025 5–6 place	Maccabi Tel Aviv	2–1	Hapoel Jerusalem	Tel Aviv
20:00	Abu Farchi 12'; Turgeman 59'		87' (pen.) Badash	Stadium: Bloomfield Stadium; Attendance: 7,402; Referee: Aviv Klain

== UEFA Champions League ==
Win Draw Loss Fixtures

=== Second qualifying round ===
22 July 2025 Q2 — 1st leg	Pafos FC (Cyprus)	1–1	(Israel) Maccabi Tel Aviv	Limassol, Cyprus
20:00	Bassouamina 81'	Report	Madmon 90+10'	Stadium: Limassol Stadium; Attendance: 4,557; Referee: Mykola Balakin (Ukraine)

30 July 2025 Q2 — 2nd leg	Maccabi Tel Aviv (Israel)	0–1 (1–2 agg.)	(Cyprus) Pafos FC	Bačka Topola, Serbia (Note: Due to the Gaza war, Israeli teams are required to play their home matches at neutral venues until further notice. Therefore, Maccabi Tel Aviv will play their home matches at TSC Arena, Bačka Topola, Serbia, instead of their regular stadium, Bloomfield Stadium, Tel Aviv.)
21:00		Report	Jajá 40'	Stadium: TSC Arena; Attendance: 421; Referee: Radu Petrescu (Romania)

== UEFA Europa League ==
Win Draw Loss Fixtures

=== Third qualifying round ===
5 August 2025 Q3 — 1st leg	Hamrun Spartans (Malta)	1–2	(Israel) Maccabi Tel Aviv	Paola, Malta
19:00	Koffi 71' (pen.)	Report	Revivo 79'; Madmon 90+6'	Stadium: Tony Bezzina Stadium; Attendance: 1,097; Referee: Kristo Tohver (Estonia)

14 August 2025 Q3 — 2nd leg	Maccabi Tel Aviv (Israel)	3–1 (5–2 agg.)	(Malta) Hamrun Spartans	Bačka Topola, Serbia
20:00	Shahar 37', 45+2'; Davida 69'	Report	Mbong 43'	Stadium: TSC Arena; Attendance: 145; Referee: Rohit Saggi (Norway)

=== Play-off round ===
21 August 2025 PO — 1st leg	Maccabi Tel Aviv (Israel)	3–1	(Ukraine) Dynamo Kyiv	Bačka Topola, Serbia
20:00	Peretz 12', 69'; Yehezkel 58'	Report	Voloshyn 32'	Stadium: TSC Arena; Attendance: 115; Referee: Giorgi Kruashvili (Georgia)

28 August 2025 PO — 2nd leg	Dynamo Kyiv (Ukraine)	1–0 (2–3 agg.)	(Israel) Maccabi Tel Aviv	Lublin, Poland
20:00	Guerrero 5'			Stadium: Arena Lublin; Attendance: 1,537; Referee: Nikola Dabanović (Montenegro)

=== League phase ===
Pos	Team	Pld	W	D	L	GF	GA	GD	Pts
32	(Scottish Football Association) Rangers	8	1	1	6	5	14	−9	4
33	(French Football Federation) Nice	8	1	0	7	7	15	−8	3
34	(Royal Dutch Football Association) Utrecht	8	0	1	7	5	15	−10	1
35	(Swedish Football Association) Malmö FF	8	0	1	7	4	15	−11	1
36	(Israel Football Association) Maccabi Tel Aviv	8	0	1	7	2	22	−20	1

Source: UEFA
Rules for classification: League phase tiebreakers

24 September 2025	PAOK (Greece)	0–0	(Israel) Maccabi Tel Aviv	Toumba Stadium, Thessaloniki
18:45 (19:45 UTC+3)		Report		Referee: Sven Jablonski (Germany)

2 October 2025	Maccabi Tel Aviv (Israel)	1–3	(Croatia) Dinamo Zagreb	TSC Arena, Bačka Topola, Serbia
21:00	Abu Farchi 14'	Report	Lisica 16'; Ljubičić 19', 72'	Attendance: 255; Referee: António Nobre (Portugal)

23 October 2025	Maccabi Tel Aviv (Israel)	0–3	(Denmark) Midtjylland	TSC Arena, Bačka Topola, Serbia
21:00		Report	Djú 44', 84'; Billing 71'	Attendance: 487; Referee: Georgi Kabakov (Bulgaria)

6 November 2025	Aston Villa (England)	2–0	(Israel) Maccabi Tel Aviv	Villa Park, Birmingham
21:00 (20:00 UTC+0)	Maatsen 45+1'; Malen 59' (pen.)	Report		Attendance: 29,429; Referee: Julian Weinberger (Austria)

27 November 2025	Maccabi Tel Aviv (Israel)	0–6	(France) Lyon	TSC Arena, Bačka Topola, Serbia
21:00		Report	Abner 4'; Tolisso 25', 51', 53'; Niakhaté 35' (pen.); Karabec 62'	Attendance: 320; Referee: Kristo Tohver (Estonia)

11 December 2025	VfB Stuttgart (Germany)	4–1	(Israel) Maccabi Tel Aviv	MHPArena, Stuttgart
18:45	Assignon 24'; Tomás 37'; Mittelstädt 50' (pen.); Vagnoman 90+4'	Report	Revivo 52'	Attendance: 57,000; Referee: Marian Barbu (Romania)

22 January 2026	SC Freiburg (Germany)	1–0	(Israel) Maccabi Tel Aviv	Europa-Park Stadion, Freiburg im Breisgau
18:45	Matanović 82'	Report		Attendance: 17,956; Referee: Mohammed Al-Hakim (Sweden)

29 January 2026	Maccabi Tel Aviv (Israel)	0–3	(Italy) Bologna	TSC Arena, Bačka Topola, Serbia
21:00		Report	Rowe 35'; Orsolini 47'; Pobega 90+4'	Attendance: 81; Referee: Goga Kikacheishvili (Georgia)
