= 2024–25 UEFA Europa League qualifying =

European football tournament

The 2024–25 UEFA Europa League qualifying phase and play-off round began on 11 July and ended on 29 August 2024.

A total of 52 teams competed in the qualifying system, which included the qualifying phase and the play-off round. The 12 winners of the play-off round advanced to the league phase, to join the 13 teams that entered in the league stage, along with the seven losers of the Champions League play-off round (five from the Champions Path and two from the League Path), and the four losers of the Champions League third qualifying round (League Path).

Times are CEST (UTC+2), as listed by UEFA (local times, if different, are in parentheses).

== Format ==
The qualifying phase was split into two paths – the Champions Path and the Main Path. The Champions Path contained teams which were eliminated from the Champions League Champions Path, and the Main Path contained teams which qualified as the third-placed or the fourth-placed team from their domestic league or as domestic cup winners. The paths were merged in the play-off round.

Each tie was played over two legs, with each team playing one leg at home. The team that scored more goals on aggregate over the two legs advanced to the next round. If the aggregate score was level at the end of normal time of the second leg, extra time was played, and if the same number of goals was scored by both teams during extra time, the tie was decided by a penalty shoot-out.

In the draws for each round, teams were seeded based on their UEFA club coefficients at the beginning of the season, with the teams divided into seeded and unseeded pots containing the same number of teams. A seeded team was drawn against an unseeded team, with the order of legs in each tie decided by draw. As the identity of the winners of the previous round may not have been known at the time of the draws, the seeding was carried out under the assumption that the team with the higher coefficient of an undecided tie advanced to the subsequent round. In practice, this meant if the team with the lower coefficient advanced in the Europa League or the team with the higher coefficient was eliminated from the Champions League, it would simply take the seeding of its opponent.

Prior to the draws, UEFA could form "groups" in accordance with the principles set by the Club Competitions Committee, purely for the convenience of the draw and not to resemble any real groupings in the sense of the competition. Teams from associations with political conflicts as decided by UEFA could not be drawn into the same tie. After the draws, the order of legs of a tie could be reversed by UEFA due to scheduling or venue conflicts.

== Schedule ==
The schedule of the competition was as follows. Matches were scheduled for Thursdays, though exceptionally could take place on Tuesdays or Wednesdays due to scheduling conflicts.

Schedule for 2024–25 UEFA Europa League
Round	Draw date	First leg	Second leg
First qualifying round	18 June 2024	11 July 2024	18 July 2024
Second qualifying round	19 June 2024	25 July 2024	1 August 2024
Third qualifying round	22 July 2024	8 August 2024	15 August 2024
Play-off round	5 August 2024	22 August 2024	29 August 2024

== Teams ==
In the qualifying stage, the teams were divided into two paths:

- Champions Path (12 teams):
  - Third qualifying round: 12 losers of the Champions League Champions Path second qualifying round.
- Main Path:
  - First qualifying round (12 teams): 12 teams which entered in this round.
  - Second qualifying round (18 teams): 12 teams which entered in this round, and 6 winners of the first qualifying round.
  - Third qualifying round (14 teams): 3 teams which entered in this round, 2 losers of the Champions League League Path second qualifying round, and 9 winners of the second qualifying round.

The winners of the third qualifying round were combined into a single path for the play-off round:

- Play-off round (24 teams): 5 teams which entered this round, 6 losers of the Champions League Champions Path third qualifying round, 6 winners of the Champions Path third qualifying round, and 7 winners of the Main Path third qualifying round.

All teams eliminated from the qualifying phase and play-off round entered the Conference League:

- The 6 losers of the Main Path first qualifying round entered the Main Path second qualifying round.
- The 9 losers of the Main Path second qualifying round entered the Main Path third qualifying round.
- The 6 losers of the Champions Path third qualifying round entered the Champions Path play-off round.
- The 7 losers of the Main Path third qualifying round entered the Main Path play-off round.
- The 12 losers of the play-off round entered the league phase.

Below were the participating teams (with their 2024 UEFA club coefficients, not used as seeding for the Champions Path, however), grouped by their starting rounds.

Key to colours
Winners of play-off round advanced to league phase
Losers of play-off round entered Conference League league phase
Losers of third qualifying round entered Conference League play-off round
Losers of second qualifying round entered Conference League third qualifying round
Losers of first qualifying round entered Conference League second qualifying round

Play-off round
Team	Coeff.
(Greece) PAOK	37.000
(Austria) LASK	37.000
(Hungary) Ferencváros	35.000
(Bulgaria) Ludogorets Razgrad	26.000
(Cyprus) APOEL	14.500
(Belgium) Anderlecht	14.500
(Turkey) Beşiktaş	12.000
(Romania) FCSB	10.500
(Scotland) Heart of Midlothian	7.210
(Serbia) TSC	5.555
(Poland) Jagiellonia Białystok	5.075

Third qualifying round (Champions Path)
Team	Coeff.
(Israel) Maccabi Tel Aviv	35.500
(Faroe Islands) KÍ	10.000
(Republic of Ireland) Shamrock Rovers	9.500
(Gibraltar) Lincoln Red Imps	9.000
(Wales) The New Saints	8.500
(Latvia) RFS	8.000
(Moldova) Petrocub Hîncești	7.000
(Bosnia and Herzegovina) Borac Banja Luka	5.500
(Slovenia) Celje	4.500
(Belarus) Dinamo Minsk	4.500
(Lithuania) Panevėžys	4.000
(Andorra) UE Santa Coloma	1.199

Third qualifying round (Main Path)
Team	Coeff.
(Czech Republic) Viktoria Plzeň	28.000
(Serbia) Partizan	25.500
(Switzerland) Servette	9.000
(Switzerland) Lugano	8.000
(Ukraine) Kryvbas Kryvyi Rih	5.600

Second qualifying round
Team	Coeff.
(Netherlands) Ajax	67.000
(Portugal) Braga	49.000
(Norway) Molde	28.500
(Austria) Rapid Wien	14.000
(Croatia) Rijeka	12.000
(Turkey) Trabzonspor	11.500
(Belgium) Cercle Brugge	9.760
(Scotland) Kilmarnock	7.210
(Greece) Panathinaikos	6.305
(Denmark) Silkeborg	6.290
(Israel) Maccabi Petah Tikva	6.225
(Serbia) Vojvodina	5.555

First qualifying round
Team	Coeff.
(Moldova) Sheriff Tiraspol	20.000
(Slovenia) Maribor	9.500
(Kazakhstan) Tobol	7.500
(Poland) Wisła Kraków	5.075
(Cyprus) Pafos	4.420
(Hungary) Paks	4.375
(Sweden) IF Elfsborg	4.300
(Romania) Corvinul Hunedoara	4.275
(Bulgaria) Botev Plovdiv	4.075
(Azerbaijan) Zira	4.025
(Slovakia) Ružomberok	3.925
(Kosovo) Llapi	2.308

Notes

1. ^{CH Q3} Losers of Champions League third qualifying round (Champions Path).
2. ^{CH Q2} Losers of Champions League second qualifying round (Champions Path).
3. ^{LP Q2} Losers of Champions League second qualifying round (League Path).

== First qualifying round ==
The draw for the first qualifying round was held on 18 June 2024.

=== Seeding ===
A total of 12 teams played in the first qualifying round. Seeding of the teams was based on their 2024 UEFA club coefficients. The first team drawn in each tie was the home team for the first leg.

Seeded	Unseeded
(Moldova) Sheriff Tiraspol; (Slovenia) Maribor; (Kazakhstan) Tobol; (Poland) Wisła Kraków; (Cyprus) Pafos; (Hungary) Paks	(Sweden) IF Elfsborg; (Romania) Corvinul Hunedoara; (Bulgaria) Botev Plovdiv; (Azerbaijan) Zira; (Slovakia) Ružomberok; (Kosovo) Llapi

=== Summary ===
The first legs were played on 11 July, and the second legs were played on 18 July 2024.

The winners of the ties advanced to the second qualifying round. The losers were transferred to the Conference League Main Path second qualifying round.

First qualifying round
Team 1	Agg.	Team 2	1st leg	2nd leg
Botev Plovdiv (Bulgaria)	4–3	(Slovenia) Maribor	2–1	2–2
IF Elfsborg (Sweden)	8–2	(Cyprus) Pafos	3–0	5–2
Paks (Hungary)	2–4	(Romania) Corvinul Hunedoara	0–4	2–0
Sheriff Tiraspol (Moldova)	2–2 (5–4 p)	(Azerbaijan) Zira	0–1	2–1 (a.e.t.)
Wisła Kraków (Poland)	4–1 (Note: Order of legs reversed after original draw.)	(Kosovo) Llapi	2–0	2–1
Ružomberok (Slovakia)	5–3	(Kazakhstan) Tobol	5–2	0–1

=== Matches ===
11 July 2024
20:00 (21:00 UTC+3)

Botev Plovdiv (Bulgaria)	2–1	(Slovenia) Maribor
Ujah 9'; Iliev 74'	Report	Širvys 19'

Stadion Hristo Botev, Plovdiv
Attendance: 16,318
Referee: David Dickinson (Scotland)
18 July 2024
20:15

Maribor (Slovenia)	2–2	(Bulgaria) Botev Plovdiv
J. Repas 13'; Beugre 80'	Report	Nwachukwu 47'; Ujah 60'

Ljudski vrt, Maribor
Attendance: 8,124
Referee: Vitaliy Romanov (Ukraine)

Botev Plovdiv won 4–3 on aggregate.

11 July 2024
19:00

IF Elfsborg (Sweden)	3–0	(Cyprus) Pafos
B. Zeneli 9'; Hult 59'; Frick 82'	Report

Borås Arena, Borås
Attendance: 5,011
Referee: Dmytro Panchyshyn (Ukraine)
18 July 2024
18:00 (19:00 UTC+3)

Pafos (Cyprus)	2–5	(Sweden) IF Elfsborg
Holmén 25' (o.g.); Dragomir 43'	Report	Ouma 23'; Baidoo 47'; Baldursson 48'; Abdulai 58'; A. Zeneli 85'

Alphamega Stadium, Limassol (Note: Pafos played their home match at the Alphamega Stadium in Limassol, instead of their regular stadium, the Stelios Kyriakides Stadium, in Paphos, which did not meet UEFA requirements.)
Attendance: 3,952
Referee: Gai Leibovitz (Israel)

IF Elfsborg won 8–2 on aggregate.

11 July 2024
19:00

Paks (Hungary)	0–4	(Romania) Corvinul Hunedoara
	Report	Buș 9'; Lupu 45+2', 86', 90+3'

Fehérvári úti Stadion, Paks
Attendance: 4,182
Referee: Mohammad Usman Aslam (Norway)
18 July 2024
20:00 (21:00 UTC+3)

Corvinul Hunedoara (Romania)	0–2	(Hungary) Paks
	Report	Könyves 79'; Böde 90'

Sibiu Municipal Stadium, Sibiu (Note: Corvinul Hunedoara played their home matches at the Sibiu Municipal Stadium in Sibiu, instead of their regular stadium, the Michael Klein Stadium, in Hunedoara, which did not meet UEFA requirements.)
Attendance: 8,582
Referee: Peter Kralovič (Slovakia)

Corvinul Hunedoara won 4–2 on aggregate.

11 July 2024
19:00 (20:00 UTC+3)

Sheriff Tiraspol (Moldova)	0–1	(Azerbaijan) Zira
	Report	Volkovi 88'

Sheriff Arena, Tiraspol
Attendance: 3,594
Referee: Alessandro Dudic (Switzerland)
18 July 2024
18:00 (20:00 UTC+4)

Zira (Azerbaijan)	1–2 (a.e.t.)	(Moldova) Sheriff Tiraspol
Utzig 5'	Report	Allach 54'; Yade 77'
Penalties
Alıyev (penalty scored); Ruan Renato (penalty scored); Nuriyev (penalty scored); Ibrahimli (penalty scored); F. Bayramov (penalty missed)	4–5	(penalty scored) Badolo; (penalty scored) Akanbi; (penalty scored) Pata; (penalty scored) João Paulo; (penalty scored) Allach

Dalga Arena, Baku (Note: Zira played their home match at the Dalga Arena in Baku, instead of their regular stadium, the Zira Olympic Sport Complex Stadium, in Zirə, which did not meet UEFA requirements.)
Attendance: 4,700
Referee: Bulat Sariyev (Kazakhstan)

2–2 on aggregate; Sheriff Tiraspol won 5–4 on penalties.

11 July 2024
20:30

Wisła Kraków (Poland)	2–0	(Kosovo) Llapi
Sapała 2'; Rodado 90+5'	Report

Henryk Reyman Stadium, Kraków
Attendance: 24,403
Referee: Marc Nagtegaal (Netherlands)
18 July 2024
16:30

Llapi (Kosovo)	1–2	(Poland) Wisła Kraków
Tahiri 74'	Report	Rodado 58'; Kiakos 90'

Zahir Pajaziti Stadium, Podujevo
Attendance: 0 (Note: The Llapi v Wisła Kraków match was played behind closed doors due to a punishment by UEFA to Llapi for racist behaviour of fans and pitch invasion during a match against Budućnost Podgorica in the 2022–23 UEFA Europa Conference League qualifying phase.)
Referee: Trustin Farrugia Cann (Malta)

Wisła Kraków won 4–1 on aggregate.

11 July 2024
19:00

Ružomberok (Slovakia)	5–2	(Kazakhstan) Tobol
Gabriel 11', 88'; Selecký 40'; Malý 45+3'; Madleňák 77'	Report	Ivanović 9'; Henen 45'

Štadión pod Čebraťom, Ružomberok
Attendance: 3,025
Referee: Kyriakos Athanasiou (Cyprus)
18 July 2024
17:00 (20:00 UTC+5)

Tobol (Kazakhstan)	1–0	(Slovakia) Ružomberok
El Messaoudi 8'	Report

Kostanay Central Stadium, Kostanay
Attendance: 6,830
Referee: Mikkel Redder (Denmark)

Ružomberok won 5–3 on aggregate.

== Second qualifying round ==
The draw for the second qualifying round was held on 19 June 2024.

=== Seeding ===
A total of 18 teams played in the second qualifying round. Seeding of the teams was based on their 2024 UEFA club coefficients. For the winners of the first qualifying round, whose identity was not known at the time of the draw, the club coefficient of the highest-ranked remaining team in each tie was used. Prior to the draw, UEFA formed groups of seeded and unseeded teams per the principles set by the Club Competitions Committee. The first team drawn in each tie was the home team for the first leg.

Group 1		Group 2	
Seeded	Unseeded	Seeded	Unseeded
(Netherlands) Ajax; (Norway) Molde; (Austria) Rapid Wien; (Turkey) Trabzonspor; (Belgium) Cercle Brugge	(Slovakia) Ružomberok; (Scotland) Kilmarnock; (Denmark) Silkeborg; (Serbia) Vojvodina; (Poland) Wisła Kraków	(Portugal) Braga; (Moldova) Sheriff Tiraspol; (Croatia) Rijeka; (Bulgaria) Botev Plovdiv	(Greece) Panathinaikos; (Israel) Maccabi Petah Tikva; (Sweden) IF Elfsborg; (Romania) Corvinul Hunedoara

Notes

1. ^{†} Winners of the first qualifying round, whose identity was not known at the time of draw. Teams in italics defeated a team with a higher coefficient, thus effectively taking the coefficient of their opponent in the draw.

=== Summary ===
The first legs were played on 25 July, and the second legs were played on 1 August 2024.

The winners of the ties advanced to the Main Path third qualifying round. The losers were transferred to the Conference League Main Path third qualifying round.

Second qualifying round
Team 1	Agg.	Team 2	1st leg	2nd leg
Ajax (Netherlands)	4–1	(Serbia) Vojvodina	1–0	3–1
Ružomberok (Slovakia)	0–3	(Turkey) Trabzonspor	0–2	0–1
Wisła Kraków (Poland)	2–8	(Austria) Rapid Wien	1–2	1–6
Kilmarnock (Scotland)	1–2	(Belgium) Cercle Brugge	1–1	0–1
Molde (Norway)	5–4	(Denmark) Silkeborg	3–1	2–3
Corvinul Hunedoara (Romania)	0–1	(Croatia) Rijeka	0–0	0–1
Braga (Portugal)	7–0	(Israel) Maccabi Petah Tikva	2–0	5–0
Panathinaikos (Greece)	6–1	(Bulgaria) Botev Plovdiv	2–1	4–0
Sheriff Tiraspol (Moldova)	0–3	(Sweden) IF Elfsborg	0–1	0–2

=== Matches ===
25 July 2024
20:30

Ajax (Netherlands)	1–0	(Serbia) Vojvodina
Van den Boomen 86'	Report

Johan Cruyff Arena, Amsterdam
Attendance: 53,590
Referee: César Soto Grado (Spain)
1 August 2024
20:00

Vojvodina (Serbia)	1–3	(Netherlands) Ajax
Šutalo 59' (o.g.)	Report	Šutalo 53'; Hato 85'; Traoré 90+2'

TSC Arena, Bačka Topola (Note: Vojvodina played their home match at the TSC Arena, in Bačka Topola, instead of their regular stadium, the Karađorđe Stadium, in Novi Sad, due to new turf being laid.)
Attendance: 4,412
Referee: Arda Kardeşler (Turkey)

Ajax won 4–1 on aggregate.

25 July 2024
18:30

Ružomberok (Slovakia)	0–2	(Turkey) Trabzonspor
	Report	Trézéguet 39'; Çanak 90+1'

Štadión pod Čebraťom, Ružomberok
Attendance: 4,544
Referee: Bastian Dankert (Germany)
1 August 2024
19:30 (20:30 UTC+3)

Trabzonspor (Turkey)	1–0	(Slovakia) Ružomberok
Drăguș 65'	Report

Şenol Güneş Sports Complex, Trabzon
Attendance: 26,220
Referee: Nenad Minaković (Serbia)

Trabzonspor won 3–0 on aggregate.

25 July 2024
18:00

Wisła Kraków (Poland)	1–2	(Austria) Rapid Wien
Carbó 79'	Report	Jansson 37'; Seidl 53'

Henryk Reyman Stadium, Kraków
Attendance: 30,542
Referee: Mohammed Al-Emara (Finland)
1 August 2024
20:30

Rapid Wien (Austria)	6–1	(Poland) Wisła Kraków
Burgstaller 6', 30', 35'; Beljo 24'; Raux-Yao 45'; Lang 79'	Report	Rodado 80'

Allianz Stadion, Vienna
Attendance: 19,600
Referee: Michael Oliver (England)

Rapid Wien won 8–2 on aggregate.

25 July 2024
20:30 (19:30 UTC+1)

Kilmarnock (Scotland)	1–1	(Belgium) Cercle Brugge
Watson 70'	Report	Olaigbe 55'

Rugby Park, Kilmarnock
Attendance: 10,410
Referee: Martin Dohal (Slovakia)
1 August 2024
20:00

Cercle Brugge (Belgium)	1–0	(Scotland) Kilmarnock
Somers 21'	Report

Jan Breydel Stadium, Bruges
Attendance: 10,230
Referee: Ante Čulina (Croatia)

Cercle Brugge won 2–1 on aggregate.

25 July 2024
19:00

Molde (Norway)	3–1	(Denmark) Silkeborg
Kaasa 2'; Eikrem 45+1'; Eriksen 49'	Report	Lind 35'

Aker Stadion, Molde
Attendance: 3,900
Referee: Adam Ladebäck (Sweden)
1 August 2024
19:15

Silkeborg (Denmark)	3–2	(Norway) Molde
Adamsen 3' (pen.), 57'; Bakiz 88'	Report	Breivik 22'; Kaasa 81'

JYSK Park, Silkeborg
Attendance: 4,731
Referee: Luka Bilbija (Bosnia and Herzegovina)

Molde won 5–4 on aggregate.

25 July 2024
19:00 (20:00 UTC+3)

Corvinul Hunedoara (Romania)	0–0	(Croatia) Rijeka
	Report

Sibiu Municipal Stadium, Sibiu
Attendance: 7,432
Referee: Philip Farrugia (Malta)
1 August 2024
20:00

Rijeka (Croatia)	1–0	(Romania) Corvinul Hunedoara
Petrovič 12'	Report

Stadion Rujevica, Rijeka
Attendance: 4,683
Referee: Sivert Øksnes Amland (Norway)

Rijeka won 1–0 on aggregate.

25 July 2024
21:30 (20:30 UTC+1)

Braga (Portugal)	2–0	(Israel) Maccabi Petah Tikva
R. Horta 56'; Zalazar 59' (pen.)	Report

Estádio Municipal, Braga
Attendance: 14,891
Referee: Luca Pairetto (Italy)
1 August 2024
20:30 (21:30 UTC+3)

Maccabi Petah Tikva (Israel)	0–5	(Portugal) Braga
	Report	Marín 29'; Fernandes 41'; Zalazar 45+4'; Galabov 62' (o.g.); El Ouazzani 90+1' (pen.)

Stadion Georgi Asparuhov, Sofia, Bulgaria (Note: Due to the Gaza war, Israeli teams were required to play their home matches at neutral venues until further notice.)
Attendance: 211
Referee: Evangelos Manouchos (Greece)

Braga won 7–0 on aggregate.

25 July 2024
19:00 (20:00 UTC+3)

Panathinaikos (Greece)	2–1	(Bulgaria) Botev Plovdiv
Jeremejeff 8'; Bakasetas 44' (pen.)	Report	Korošec 71'

Olympic Stadium, Athens
Attendance: 11,236
Referee: David Fuxman (Israel)
1 August 2024
20:00 (21:00 UTC+3)

Botev Plovdiv (Bulgaria)	0–4	(Greece) Panathinaikos
	Report	Jeremejeff 6', 50'; Ujah 34' (o.g.); Đuričić 45'

Stadion Hristo Botev, Plovdiv
Attendance: 17,076
Referee: Daniel Schlager (Germany)

Panathinaikos won 6–1 on aggregate.

25 July 2024
19:00 (20:00 UTC+3)

Sheriff Tiraspol (Moldova)	0–1	(Sweden) IF Elfsborg
	Report	Hedlund 86' (pen.)

Sheriff Arena, Tiraspol
Attendance: 3,751
Referee: Marek Radina (Czech Republic)
1 August 2024
19:00

IF Elfsborg (Sweden)	2–0	(Moldova) Sheriff Tiraspol
Abdullai 2'; Baidoo 73'	Report

Borås Arena, Borås
Attendance: 5,414
Referee: Luis Godinho (Portugal)

IF Elfsborg won 3–0 on aggregate.

== Third qualifying round ==
The draw for the third qualifying round was held on 22 July 2024.

=== Seeding ===
A total of 26 teams played in the third qualifying round – 12 in the Champions Path and 14 in the Main Path. Seeding of the teams was based on their 2024 UEFA club coefficients. For the winners of the second qualifying round, whose identity was not known at the time of the draw, the club coefficient of the highest-ranked remaining team in each tie was used. For the losers of the Champions League second qualifying round, the club coefficient of the lower-ranked team in each tie was used. Prior to the draw, UEFA formed groups of seeded and unseeded teams per the principles set by the Club Competitions Committee. The first team drawn in each tie was the home team for the first leg.

Champions Path
Group 1		Group 2	
Seeded	Unseeded	Seeded	Unseeded
(Faroe Islands) KÍ; (Republic of Ireland) Shamrock Rovers; (Latvia) RFS	(Bosnia and Herzegovina) Borac Banja Luka; (Slovenia) Celje; (Andorra) UE Santa Coloma	(Israel) Maccabi Tel Aviv; (Gibraltar) Lincoln Red Imps; (Wales) The New Saints	(Moldova) Petrocub Hîncești; (Belarus) Dinamo Minsk; (Lithuania) Panevėžys

Main Path
Group 1		Group 2	
Seeded	Unseeded	Seeded	Unseeded
(Netherlands) Ajax; (Norway) Molde; (Serbia) Partizan; (Austria) Rapid Wien	(Turkey) Trabzonspor; (Belgium) Cercle Brugge; (Switzerland) Lugano; (Greece) Panathinaikos	(Portugal) Braga; (Czech Republic) Viktoria Plzeň; (Sweden) IF Elfsborg	(Croatia) Rijeka; (Switzerland) Servette; (Ukraine) Kryvbas Kryvyi Rih

Notes

1. ^{†} Losers of the Champions League second qualifying round, whose identity was not known at the time of draw. Teams in italics lost to a team with a lower coefficient, thus effectively taking the coefficient of their opponent in the draw.
2. ^{††} Winners of the second qualifying round, whose identity was not known at the time of draw. Teams in italics defeated a team with a higher coefficient, thus effectively taking the coefficient of their opponent in the draw.

=== Summary ===
The first legs were played on 6 and 8 August, and the second legs were played on 13, 14 and 15 August 2024.

The winners of the ties advanced to the play-off round. The Champions Path losers were transferred to the Conference League Champions Path play-off round, while the Main Path losers were transferred to the Conference League Main Path play-off round.

Third qualifying round
Team 1	Agg.	Team 2	1st leg	2nd leg
Champions Path
KÍ (Faroe Islands)	3–4	(Bosnia and Herzegovina) Borac Banja Luka	2–1	1–3 (a.e.t.)
UE Santa Coloma (Andorra)	0–9	(Latvia) RFS	0–2	0–7
Celje (Slovenia)	2–3	(Republic of Ireland) Shamrock Rovers	1–0	1–3 (a.e.t.)
Panevėžys (Lithuania)	1–5	(Israel) Maccabi Tel Aviv	1–2	0–3
Petrocub Hîncești (Moldova)	1–0	(Wales) The New Saints	1–0	0–0
Dinamo Minsk (Belarus)	3–2	(Gibraltar) Lincoln Red Imps	2–0	1–2
Main Path
Partizan (Serbia)	2–3	(Switzerland) Lugano	0–1	2–2 (a.e.t.)
Molde (Norway)	3–1	(Belgium) Cercle Brugge	3–0	0–1
Panathinaikos (Greece)	1–1 (12–13 p)	(Netherlands) Ajax	0–1	1–0 (a.e.t.)
Trabzonspor (Turkey)	0–3	(Austria) Rapid Wien	0–1	0–2
Braga (Portugal)	2–1	(Switzerland) Servette	0–0	2–1
Rijeka (Croatia)	1–3	(Sweden) IF Elfsborg	1–1	0–2
Kryvbas Kryvyi Rih (Ukraine)	1–3	(Czech Republic) Viktoria Plzeň	1–2	0–1

=== Champions Path matches ===
8 August 2024
19:00 (18:00 UTC+1)

KÍ (Faroe Islands)	2–1	(Bosnia and Herzegovina) Borac Banja Luka
Klettskarð 10'; Ødemarksbakken 36'	Report	Jensen 31' (o.g.)

Tórsvøllur, Tórshavn (Note: KÍ played their home match at Tórsvøllur, in Tórshavn, instead of their regular stadium, Við Djúpumýrar, in Klaksvík, which did not meet UEFA requirements.)
Attendance: 1,301
Referee: Marek Radina (Czech Republic)
15 August 2024
21:00

Borac Banja Luka (Bosnia and Herzegovina)	3–1 (a.e.t.)	(Faroe Islands) KÍ
Srećković 17'; Savić 82'; Meijers 93'	Report	Pavlović 53'

Banja Luka City Stadium, Banja Luka
Attendance: 5,800
Referee: Georgi Kabakov (Bulgaria)

Borac Banja Luka won 4–3 on aggregate.

8 August 2024
20:00

UE Santa Coloma (Andorra)	0–2	(Latvia) RFS
	Report	Ikaunieks 13'; Osuagwu 37'

Estadi Nacional, Andorra la Vella
Attendance: 369
Referee: Yigal Frid (Israel)
14 August 2024
18:00 (19:00 UTC+3)

RFS (Latvia)	7–0	(Andorra) UE Santa Coloma
Ikaunieks 2', 10', 22'; Lipušček 17'; Osuagwu 44'; Ķigurs 67'; Mareš 77' (pen.)	Report

LNK Sporta Parks, Riga
Attendance: 1,614
Referee: Juxhin Xhaja (Albania)

RFS won 9–0 on aggregate.

8 August 2024
20:15

Celje (Slovenia)	1–0	(Republic of Ireland) Shamrock Rovers
Menalo 34'	Report

Stadion Z'dežele, Celje
Attendance: 2,478
Referee: Damian Sylwestrzak (Poland)
15 August 2024
21:00 (20:00 UTC+1)

Shamrock Rovers (Republic of Ireland)	3–1 (a.e.t.)	(Slovenia) Celje
Watts 37' (pen.); Farrugia 41'; Burke 96'	Report	Karničnik 83'

Tallaght Stadium, Tallaght
Attendance: 6,153
Referee: Ovidiu Hațegan (Romania)

Shamrock Rovers won 3–2 on aggregate.

6 August 2024
18:30 (19:30 UTC+3)

Panevėžys (Lithuania)	1–2	(Israel) Maccabi Tel Aviv
Gussiås 70'	Report	Peretz 3'; Turgeman 10'

LFF Stadium, Vilnius (Note: Panevėžys played their home match at the LFF Stadium in Vilnius, instead of their regular stadium, the Aukštaitija Stadium, in Panevėžys, which did not meet UEFA requirements.)
Attendance: 1,312
Referee: Aliyar Aghayev (Azerbaijan)
15 August 2024
20:30

Maccabi Tel Aviv (Israel)	3–0	(Lithuania) Panevėžys
Peretz 45+3'; Davida 54'; Yehezkel 70'	Report

Haladás Stadium, Szombathely, Hungary
Attendance: 34
Referee: Nick Walsh (Scotland)

Maccabi Tel Aviv won 5–1 on aggregate.

6 August 2024
19:00 (20:00 UTC+3)

Petrocub Hîncești (Moldova)	1–0	(Wales) The New Saints
Davies 20' (o.g.)	Report

Stadionul Zimbru, Chișinău (Note: Petrocub Hîncești played their home matches at the Zimbru Stadium in Chișinău, instead of their regular stadium, the Stadionul Municipal, in Hîncești, which did not meet UEFA requirements.)
Attendance: 6,272
Referee: Mohammed Al-Hakim (Sweden)
13 August 2024
19:30 (18:30 UTC+1)

The New Saints (Wales)	0–0	(Moldova) Petrocub Hîncești
	Report

Park Hall, Oswestry
Attendance: 851
Referee: Robert Jones (England)

Petrocub Hîncești won 1–0 on aggregate.

8 August 2024
20:45

Dinamo Minsk (Belarus)	2–0	(Gibraltar) Lincoln Red Imps
Hawrylovich 36'; Pedro Igor 87'	Report

Mezőkövesdi Városi Stadion, Mezőkövesd, Hungary (Note: Due to the country's involvement in the Russian invasion of Ukraine, Belarusian teams were required to play their home matches at neutral venues and behind closed doors until further notice.)
Attendance: 20
Referee: Nenad Minaković (Serbia)
15 August 2024
18:00

Lincoln Red Imps (Gibraltar)	2–1	(Belarus) Dinamo Minsk
De Barr 30'; Pigas 78' (o.g.)	Report	Alfred 54'

Europa Sports Park, Gibraltar (Note: Lincoln Red Imps played their home match at Europa Sports Park, instead of the Victoria Stadium, due to renovation works.)
Attendance: 587
Referee: Anastasios Papapetrou (Greece)

Dinamo Minsk won 3–2 on aggregate.

=== Main Path matches ===
8 August 2024
20:00

Partizan (Serbia)	0–1	(Switzerland) Lugano
	Report	Zanotti 73'

Partizan Stadium, Belgrade
Attendance: 3,163
Referee: Sander van der Eijk (Netherlands)
15 August 2024
20:30

Lugano (Switzerland)	2–2 (a.e.t.)	(Serbia) Partizan
Steffen 47'; Mahmoud 111'	Report	Zahid 44'; Marković 67'

Stockhorn Arena, Thun (Note: Lugano played their home matches at the Stockhorn Arena, in Thun, instead of their regular stadium, the Cornaredo Stadium, in Lugano, due to renovation works.)
Attendance: 2,268
Referee: Ricardo de Burgos Bengoetxea (Spain)

Lugano won 3–2 on aggregate.

8 August 2024
19:00

Molde (Norway)	3–0	(Belgium) Cercle Brugge
Eriksen 3'; Eikrem 18'; Linnes 30'	Report

Aker Stadion, Molde
Attendance: 4,200
Referee: Luis Godinho (Portugal)
15 August 2024
20:00

Cercle Brugge (Belgium)	1–0	(Norway) Molde
Ouattara 41'	Report

Jan Breydel Stadium, Bruges
Attendance: 4,504
Referee: Balázs Berke (Hungary)

Molde won 3–1 on aggregate.

8 August 2024
20:00 (21:00 UTC+3)

Panathinaikos (Greece)	0–1	(Netherlands) Ajax
	Report	Berghuis 28'

Olympic Stadium, Athens
Attendance: 24,452
Referee: Filip Glova (Slovakia)
15 August 2024
20:15

Ajax (Netherlands)	0–1 (a.e.t.)	(Greece) Panathinaikos
	Report	Tetê 89'
Penalties
Bergwijn (penalty scored); Van den Boomen (penalty scored); Godts (penalty scored); Taylor (penalty scored); Brobbey (penalty missed); Henderson (penalty scored); Traoré (penalty missed); Baas (penalty missed); Gaaei (penalty scored); Šutalo (penalty scored); Pasveer (penalty scored); Bergwijn (penalty scored); Van den Boomen (penalty scored); Godts (penalty scored); Taylor (penalty scored); Brobbey (penalty missed); Gaaei (penalty scored)	13–12	(penalty missed) Mancini; (penalty scored) Jeremejeff; (penalty scored) Tetê; (penalty scored) Jedvaj; (penalty scored) Mladenović; (penalty scored) Vilhena; (penalty missed) Maksimović; (penalty missed) Ingason; (penalty scored) Vagiannidis; (penalty scored) Zeca; (penalty scored) Drągowski; (penalty scored) Mancini; (penalty scored) Jeremejeff; (penalty scored) Tetê; (penalty scored) Jedvaj; (penalty missed) Mladenović; (penalty missed) Vilhena

Johan Cruyff Arena, Amsterdam
Attendance: 54,089
Referee: Chris Kavanagh (England)

1–1 on aggregate; Ajax won 13–12 on penalties.

8 August 2024
19:00 (20:00 UTC+3)

Trabzonspor (Turkey)	0–1	(Austria) Rapid Wien
	Report	Grgić 67'

Şenol Güneş Sports Complex, Trabzon
Attendance: 33,476
Referee: Kristo Tohver (Estonia)
15 August 2024
18:00

Rapid Wien (Austria)	2–0	(Turkey) Trabzonspor
Seidl 77'; Lang 87'	Report

Allianz Stadion, Vienna
Attendance: 22,500
Referee: Manfredas Lukjančukas (Lithuania)

Rapid Wien won 3–0 on aggregate.

8 August 2024
21:30 (20:30 UTC+1)

Braga (Portugal)	0–0	(Switzerland) Servette
	Report

Estádio Municipal, Braga
Attendance: 16,603
Referee: Giorgi Kruashvili (Georgia)
15 August 2024
20:30

Servette (Switzerland)	1–2	(Portugal) Braga
Kutesa 90+1'	Report	El Ouazzani 45+1'; Fernández 69'

Stade de Genève, Geneva
Attendance: 15,179
Referee: Igor Pajač (Croatia)

Braga won 2–1 on aggregate.

8 August 2024
20:00

Rijeka (Croatia)	1–1	(Sweden) IF Elfsborg
Galešić 45+2'	Report	Abdulai 24'

Stadion Rujevica, Rijeka
Attendance: 4,867
Referee: Anastasios Sidiropoulos (Greece)
15 August 2024
19:00

IF Elfsborg (Sweden)	2–0	(Croatia) Rijeka
Baidoo 68'; Qasem 83'	Report

Borås Arena, Borås
Attendance: 6,035
Referee: Andris Treimanis (Latvia)

IF Elfsborg won 3–1 on aggregate.

8 August 2024
20:00

Kryvbas Kryvyi Rih (Ukraine)	1–2	(Czech Republic) Viktoria Plzeň
Adu 20'	Report	Panoš 49'; Vašulín 69'

Košická futbalová aréna, Košice, Slovakia (Note: Due to the Russian invasion of Ukraine, Ukrainian teams were required to play their home matches at neutral venues until further notice.)
Attendance: 1,800
Referee: Sebastian Gishamer (Austria)
15 August 2024
19:00

Viktoria Plzeň (Czech Republic)	1–0	(Ukraine) Kryvbas Kryvyi Rih
Vašulín 52'	Report

Doosan Arena, Plzeň
Attendance: 10,657
Referee: Horațiu Feșnic (Romania)

Viktoria Plzeň won 3–1 on aggregate.

== Play-off round ==
The draw for the play-off round was held on 5 August 2024.

=== Seeding ===
A total of 24 teams played in the play-off round. Seeding of the teams was based on their 2024 UEFA club coefficients. For the winners of the third qualifying round, whose identity was not known at the time of the draw, the club coefficient of the highest-ranked remaining team in each tie was used. For the losers of the Champions League third qualifying round, the club coefficient of the lower-ranked team in each tie was used. Before the draw, UEFA formed groups of seeded and unseeded teams per the principles set by the Club Competitions Committee. The first team drawn in each tie was the home team for the first leg.

Group 1		Group 2		Group 3	
Seeded	Unseeded	Seeded	Unseeded	Seeded	Unseeded
(Netherlands) Ajax; (Bulgaria) Ludogorets Razgrad; (Switzerland) Lugano; (Belgium) Anderlecht	(Turkey) Beşiktaş; (Belarus) Dinamo Minsk; (Moldova) Petrocub Hîncești; (Poland) Jagiellonia Białystok	(Austria) LASK; (Israel) Maccabi Tel Aviv; (Greece) PAOK; (Cyprus) APOEL	(Romania) FCSB; (Republic of Ireland) Shamrock Rovers; (Latvia) RFS; (Serbia) TSC	(Portugal) Braga; (Norway) Molde; (Czech Republic) Viktoria Plzeň; (Hungary) Ferencváros	(Austria) Rapid Wien; (Sweden) IF Elfsborg; (Bosnia and Herzegovina) Borac Banja Luka; (Scotland) Heart of Midlothian

Notes

1. ^{†} Losers of the Champions League third qualifying round, whose identity was not known at the time of draw. Teams in italics lost to a team with a lower coefficient, thus effectively taking the coefficient of their opponent in the draw.
2. ^{††} Winners of the third qualifying round, whose identity was not known at the time of draw. Teams in italics defeated a team with a higher coefficient, thus effectively taking the coefficient of their opponent in the draw.

=== Summary ===
The first legs were played on 22 August, and the second legs were played on 29 August 2024.

The winners of the ties advanced to the league phase. The losers were transferred to the Conference League league phase.

Play-off round
Team 1	Agg.	Team 2	1st leg	2nd leg
Dinamo Minsk (Belarus)	0–2	(Belgium) Anderlecht	0–1	0–1
Jagiellonia Białystok (Poland)	1–7	(Netherlands) Ajax	1–4	0–3
Ludogorets Razgrad (Bulgaria)	6–1	(Moldova) Petrocub Hîncești	4–0	2–1
Lugano (Switzerland)	4–8	(Turkey) Beşiktaş	3–3	1–5
LASK (Austria)	1–2	(Romania) FCSB	1–1	0–1
RFS (Latvia)	3–3 (4–2 p)	(Cyprus) APOEL	2–1	1–2 (a.e.t.)
Maccabi Tel Aviv (Israel)	8–1	(Serbia) TSC	3–0	5–1
PAOK (Greece)	6–0	(Republic of Ireland) Shamrock Rovers	4–0	2–0
Ferencváros (Hungary)	1–1 (3–2 p)	(Bosnia and Herzegovina) Borac Banja Luka	0–0	1–1 (a.e.t.)
Molde (Norway)	1–1 (2–4 p)	(Sweden) IF Elfsborg	0–1	1–0 (a.e.t.)
Braga (Portugal)	4–3	(Austria) Rapid Wien	2–1	2–2
Viktoria Plzeň (Czech Republic)	2–0	(Scotland) Heart of Midlothian	1–0	1–0

=== Matches ===
22 August 2024
20:45

Dinamo Minsk (Belarus)	0–1	(Belgium) Anderlecht
	Report	Augustinsson 9'

Mezőkövesdi Városi Stadion, Mezőkövesd, Hungary
Attendance: 0
Referee: Rohit Saggi (Norway)
29 August 2024
20:00

Anderlecht (Belgium)	1–0	(Belarus) Dinamo Minsk
Amuzu 84'	Report

Constant Vanden Stock Stadium, Brussels
Attendance: 17,102
Referee: Nikola Dabanović (Montenegro)

Anderlecht won 2–0 on aggregate.

22 August 2024
20:45

Jagiellonia Białystok (Poland)	1–4	(Netherlands) Ajax
Diéguez 5'	Report	Akpom 9', 61', 69' (pen.); Godts 27'

Jagiellonia Stadium, Białystok
Attendance: 19,553
Referee: Rade Obrenovič (Slovenia)
29 August 2024
20:00

Ajax (Netherlands)	3–0	(Poland) Jagiellonia Białystok
Fitz-Jim 43'; Taylor 64'; Brobbey 71'	Report

Johan Cruyff Arena, Amsterdam
Attendance: 54,010
Referee: Maurizio Mariani (Italy)

Ajax won 7–1 on aggregate.

22 August 2024
20:00 (21:00 UTC+3)

Ludogorets Razgrad (Bulgaria)	4–0	(Moldova) Petrocub Hîncești
Duah 23'; Rwan 59'; Almeida 90+1', 90+4'	Report

Huvepharma Arena, Razgrad
Attendance: 3,965
Referee: Anastasios Papapetrou (Greece)
29 August 2024
19:00 (20:00 UTC+3)

Petrocub Hîncești (Moldova)	1–2	(Bulgaria) Ludogorets Razgrad
Ambros 28'	Report	Delev 75'; Rick 90+3'

Stadionul Zimbru, Chișinău
Attendance: 4,576
Referee: Sascha Stegemann (Germany)

Ludogorets Razgrad won 6–1 on aggregate.

22 August 2024
20:30

Lugano (Switzerland)	3–3	(Turkey) Beşiktaş
Bislimi 34'; Steffen 56'; Gabriel 63' (o.g.)	Report	Fernandes 21', 52'; Al-Musrati 55'

Stockhorn Arena, Thun
Attendance: 5,270
Referee: Morten Krogh (Denmark)
29 August 2024
20:00 (21:00 UTC+3)

Beşiktaş (Turkey)	5–1	(Switzerland) Lugano
Immobile 7', 71'; Fernandes 65'; Silva 69'; Uçan 90+2'	Report	Vladi 59'

Beşiktaş Stadium, Istanbul
Attendance: 35,370
Referee: Radu Petrescu (Romania)

Beşiktaş won 8–4 on aggregate.

22 August 2024
19:00

LASK (Austria)	1–1	(Romania) FCSB
Taoui 34'	Report	Miculescu 45+2'

Raiffeisen Arena, Linz
Attendance: 10,650
Referee: Allard Lindhout (Netherlands)
29 August 2024
20:30 (21:30 UTC+3)

FCSB (Romania)	1–0	(Austria) LASK
Olaru 90+3'	Report

Steaua Stadium, Bucharest (Note: FCSB played their home match at the Steaua Stadium, instead of their regular stadium, the Arena Națională, as it was being used for a series of concerts including Ed Sheeran.)
Attendance: 21,523
Referee: Felix Zwayer (Germany)

FCSB won 2–1 on aggregate.

22 August 2024
19:00 (20:00 UTC+3)

RFS (Latvia)	2–1	(Cyprus) APOEL
Kouadio 31'; Ikaunieks 45+1' (pen.)	Report	El-Arabi 52'

LNK Sporta Parks, Riga
Attendance: 1,678
Referee: Aliyar Aghayev (Azerbaijan)
29 August 2024
19:00 (20:00 UTC+3)

APOEL (Cyprus)	2–1 (a.e.t.)	(Latvia) RFS
Sušić 75'; Donis 90+5'	Report	Ikaunieks 40'
Penalties
El-Arabi (penalty scored); Sarfo (penalty missed); Quintillà (penalty scored); Dvali (penalty missed)	2–4	(penalty scored) Ikaunieks; (penalty scored) Lipušček; (penalty scored) Prenga; (penalty scored) Panić

GSP Stadium, Nicosia
Attendance: 12,998
Referee: Matej Jug (Slovenia)

3–3 on aggregate; RFS won 4–2 on penalties.

22 August 2024
20:00

Maccabi Tel Aviv (Israel)	3–0	(Serbia) TSC
Turgeman 27'; Peretz 63'; Madmon 83'	Report

Haladás Stadium, Szombathely, Hungary
Attendance: 270
Referee: Sebastian Gishamer (Austria)
29 August 2024
21:00

TSC (Serbia)	1–5	(Israel) Maccabi Tel Aviv
Mboungou 90+2'	Report	Addo 2', 6'; Asante 12'; Turgeman 56'; Shahar 89'

TSC Arena, Bačka Topola
Attendance: 2,016
Referee: João Pinheiro (Portugal)

Maccabi Tel Aviv won 8–1 on aggregate.

22 August 2024
19:30 (20:30 UTC+3)

PAOK (Greece)	4–0	(Republic of Ireland) Shamrock Rovers
Cleary 45+5' (o.g.); Taison 47'; Konstantelias 67'; Rahman 90+5'	Report

Toumba Stadium, Thessaloniki
Attendance: 13,871
Referee: Enea Jorgji (Albania)
29 August 2024
21:00 (20:00 UTC+1)

Shamrock Rovers (Republic of Ireland)	0–2	(Greece) PAOK
	Report	Ozdoyev 64'; Despodov 75'

Tallaght Stadium, Tallaght
Attendance: 5,079
Referee: Donatas Rumšas (Lithuania)

PAOK won 6–0 on aggregate.

22 August 2024
21:00

Ferencváros (Hungary)	0–0	(Bosnia and Herzegovina) Borac Banja Luka
	Report

Ferencváros Stadion, Budapest
Attendance: 13,167
Referee: Nick Walsh (Scotland)
29 August 2024
21:00

Borac Banja Luka (Bosnia and Herzegovina)	1–1 (a.e.t.)	(Hungary) Ferencváros
Meijers 104'	Report	B. Varga 111' (pen.)
Penalties
Herrera (penalty missed); Kvržić (penalty scored); Savić (penalty scored); Čavić (penalty missed); Grahovac (penalty missed)	2–3	(penalty missed) Rommens; (penalty scored) Ben Romdhane; (penalty scored) Abu Fani; (penalty scored) Kady

Banja Luka City Stadium, Banja Luka
Attendance: 7,833
Referee: Erik Lambrechts (Belgium)

1–1 on aggregate; Ferencváros won 3–2 on penalties.

22 August 2024
19:00

Molde (Norway)	0–1	(Sweden) IF Elfsborg
	Report	Qasem 15'

Aker Stadion, Molde
Attendance: 4,115
Referee: István Kovács (Romania)
29 August 2024
19:00

IF Elfsborg (Sweden)	0–1 (a.e.t.)	(Norway) Molde
	Report	Berisha 62'
Penalties
Baidoo (penalty scored); Hedlund (penalty scored); B. Zeneli (penalty scored); Hult (penalty scored)	4–2	(penalty missed) Kaasa; (penalty scored) Ihler; (penalty missed) Hestad; (penalty scored) Løvik

Borås Arena, Borås
Attendance: 7,619
Referee: Harm Osmers (Germany)

1–1 on aggregate; IF Elfsborg won 4–2 on penalties.

22 August 2024
21:30 (20:30 UTC+1)

Braga (Portugal)	2–1	(Austria) Rapid Wien
Carvalho 33'; Zalazar 71'	Report	Burgstaller 25'

Estádio Municipal, Braga
Attendance: 15,868
Referee: Mykola Balakin (Ukraine)
29 August 2024
21:00

Rapid Wien (Austria)	2–2	(Portugal) Braga
Arrey-Mbi 9' (o.g.); Jansson 47'	Report	El Ouazzani 68' (pen.); R. Horta 70'

Allianz Stadion, Vienna
Attendance: 21,400
Referee: Anthony Taylor (England)

Braga won 4–3 on aggregate.

22 August 2024
19:00

Viktoria Plzeň (Czech Republic)	1–0	(Scotland) Heart of Midlothian
Oyegoke 90+6' (o.g.)	Report

Doosan Arena, Plzeň
Attendance: 10,506
Referee: Sven Jablonski (Germany)
29 August 2024
20:45 (19:45 UTC+1)

Heart of Midlothian (Scotland)	0–1	(Czech Republic) Viktoria Plzeň
	Report	Červ 76'

Tynecastle Park, Edinburgh
Attendance: 18,164
Referee: Georgi Kabakov (Bulgaria)

Viktoria Plzeň won 2–0 on aggregate.
