= 2024–25 Toto Cup Al =

Tournament details
- Country: Israel
- Teams: 14

Final positions
- Champions: Maccabi Tel Aviv (9th title)
- Runners-up: Maccabi Haifa
- All statistics correct as of 22 June 2024.

The 2024–25 Toto Cup Al was the 40th season of the football tournament in Israel since its introduction and the 18th tournament involving Israeli Premier League clubs only.

Maccabi Tel Aviv were the defending champions in the season that started on 27 July 2024.

== Format ==
The four clubs playing in the UEFA competitions (Maccabi Tel Aviv, Maccabi Haifa, Hapoel Be'er Sheva and Maccabi Petah Tikva) will not take part in the group stage, while the remaining ten clubs were divided into two groups of five, at the end of the group stage each of the group winners will qualify to the semi-finals. Maccabi Tel Aviv and Maccabi Petah Tikva played in the 2024 Israel Super Cup match for a place in one of the semi-finals (meeting the group winner with the least points accumulated), while Maccabi Haifa and Hapoel Be'er Sheva played for a place in the other semi-final (meeting the group winner with the most points accumulated). All clubs will participate in classification play-offs to determine their final positions.

== Group stage ==
Groups were allocated according to geographic distribution of the clubs, with the northern clubs allocated to Group A, and the southern clubs allocated to Group B. Each club will play the other clubs once.

The matches have started on 27 July 2024.

=== Group A ===
| Pos | Team | Pld | W | D | L | GF | GA | GD | Pts | Qualification | BnS | ITI | IKS | HHA | MBR |
|---|---|---|---|---|---|---|---|---|---|---|---|---|---|---|---|
| 1 | Bnei Sakhnin | 4 | 2 | 1 | 1 | 7 | 6 | +1 | 7 | Semi-finals | | 2–1 | | | 2–1 |
| 2 | Ironi Tiberias | 4 | 1 | 2 | 1 | 4 | 4 | 0 | 5 | 5–8th classification play-offs | | | | 1–1 | 1–0 |
| 3 | Ironi Kiryat Shmona | 4 | 1 | 2 | 1 | 4 | 5 | −1 | 5 | 9–10th classification play-offs | 2–1 | 1–1 | | | |
| 4 | Hapoel Haifa | 4 | 0 | 4 | 0 | 4 | 4 | 0 | 4 | 11–12th classification play-offs | 2–2 | | 1–1 | | |
| 5 | Maccabi Bnei Reineh | 4 | 1 | 1 | 2 | 3 | 3 | 0 | 4 | 13–14th classification play-offs | | | 2–0 | 0–0 | |

Source: soccerway
Legend: Blue = home team win; Yellow = draw; Red = away team win.
Rules for classification: 1) points; 2) goal difference; 3) number of wins; 4) goals scored; 5) head to head; 6) higher position in the last season.

=== Group B ===
| Pos | Team | Pld | W | D | L | GF | GA | GD | Pts | Qualification | MNE | BEI | HAH | HJE | ASH |
|---|---|---|---|---|---|---|---|---|---|---|---|---|---|---|---|
| 1 | Maccabi Netanya | 4 | 3 | 1 | 0 | 13 | 4 | +9 | 10 | Semi-finals | | 1–1 | | | 5–0 |
| 2 | Beitar Jerusalem | 4 | 2 | 1 | 1 | 9 | 5 | +4 | 7 | 5–8th classification play-offs | | | 3–0 | 2–0 | |
| 3 | Hapoel Hadera | 4 | 2 | 0 | 2 | 5 | 8 | −3 | 6 | 9–10th classification play-offs | 2–5 | | | | 2–0 |
| 4 | Hapoel Jerusalem | 4 | 1 | 0 | 3 | 5 | 7 | −2 | 3 | 11–12th classification play-offs | 1–2 | | 0–1 | | |
| 5 | F.C. Ashdod | 4 | 1 | 0 | 3 | 6 | 14 | −8 | 3 | 13–14th classification play-offs | | 4–3 | | 2–4 | |

Source: soccerway
Legend: Blue = home team win; Yellow = draw; Red = away team win.
Rules for classification: 1) points; 2) goal difference; 3) number of wins; 4) goals scored; 5) head to head; 6) higher position in last season.

== European qualification route ==
=== Israel Super Cup ===
15 July 2024
20:00

| Maccabi Tel Aviv | 2–0 | Maccabi Petah Tikva |
|---|---|---|
| Zahavi 14'; Hozez 90+4' | Report |

Bloomfield Stadium, Tel Aviv
Attendance: 16,789
Referee: Orel Grinfeld

=== UEFA qualifiers match ===
20 July 2024
20:30

| Maccabi Haifa | 3–0 | Hapoel Be'er Sheva |
|---|---|---|
| David 35'; Kinda 61'; Saba 70' | Report |

Sammy Ofer Stadium, Haifa
Attendance: 12,193
Referee: David Foxman

== Classification play-offs ==
=== 13–14th classification match ===
| 18 August 2024 13–14 place | Hapoel Haifa | 2–4 | F.C. Ashdod | Haifa |
| 19:30 | Melamed 4'; Antilevsky 24' | Report | 17' (pen.), 48' (pen.) Kna'an; 21' Nahmani; 90+4' Shahaf | Stadium: Sammy Ofer; Attendance: Ygal Frid |

=== 11–12th classification match ===
| 17 August 2024 11–12 place | Maccabi Bnei Reineh | 0–0 (4–5 p) | Hapoel Jerusalem | Nof HaGalil |
| 20:00 | | Report | | Stadium: Green Stadium; Referee: Nael Odeh |
| | Penalties |
| | Hadida (penalty scored); Unger (penalty scored); Fadida (penalty scored); Ghanem (penalty scored); Sambinha (penalty missed) | | (penalty scored) Cédric; (penalty scored) Nadir; (penalty scored) Piven; (penalty scored) Ransom; (penalty scored) Bitton |

=== 9–10th classification match ===
| 17 August 2024 9–10 place | Ironi Kiryat Shmona | 1–2 | Hapoel Hadera | Netanya |
| 19:00 | Cohen 86' | Report | 34' Twizer; 81' Lugasi | Stadium: Netanya Stadium; Referee: Gal Leibovich |

=== 7–8th classification match ===
| 18 August 2024 7–8 place | Hapoel Be'er Sheva | 2–3 | Ironi Tiberias | Petah Tikva |
| 19:45 | Ganah 53'; Peretz 67' (pen.) | Report | 20' Shaban; 55' Bilenkyi; 90+2' Abramov | Stadium: HaMoshava Stadium; Referee: Aviad Shiloach |

=== 5–6th classification match ===
| 19 August 2024 5–6 place | Maccabi Petah Tikva | 1–4 | Beitar Jerusalem | Petah Tikva |
| 20:00 | Hazan 87' | Report | 8', 45+2' George; 15' Kangani; 73' Dabush | Stadium: HaMoshava Stadium; Attendance: 3,340; Referee: Yoav Mizrachi |

== Semi-finals ==
| 18 August 2024 Semi-final | Maccabi Tel Aviv | 2–1 | Bnei Sakhnin | Tel Aviv |
| 20:00 | Zahavi 84' (pen.); Davida 90+3' | Report | 90+5' Hleihel | Stadium: Bloomfield Stadium; Referee: Orel Grinfeld |

| 17 August 2024 Semi-final | Maccabi Haifa | 2–1 | Maccabi Netanya | Haifa |
| 20:30 | Saba 27', 86'; Seck (yellow card) 90+5' | Report | 3' Levi; (yellow card) 32' Zlatanović; (yellow card) 72' Plakuschenko | Stadium: Sammy Ofer Stadium; Attendance: 17,153; Referee: Snir Levi |

== Final ==
| 25 December 2024 Final | Maccabi Tel Aviv | 3–1 | Maccabi Haifa | Netanya |
| 20:00 | Patati 62'; Peretz 67', 77' | Report | David 29' | Stadium: Netanya Stadium |

== Final rankings ==
| R | Team |
|---|---|
| 1st place, gold medalist(s) | Maccabi Tel Aviv |
| 2nd place, silver medalist(s) | Maccabi Haifa |
| 3rd place, bronze medalist(s) | Maccabi Netanya |
| 3rd place, bronze medalist(s) | Bnei Sakhnin |
| 5 | Beitar Jerusalem |
| 6 | Maccabi Petah Tikva |
| 7 | Ironi Tiberias |
| 8 | Hapoel Be'er Sheva |
| 9 | Hapoel Hadera |
| 10 | Ironi Kiryat Shmona |
| 11 | Hapoel Jerusalem |
| 12 | Maccabi Bnei Reineh |
| 13 | F.C. Ashdod |
| 14 | Hapoel Haifa |
