= Dor Turgeman =

Israeli footballer (born 2003)

- Turgeman with the New England Revolution in 2026

Personal information
- Full name: Dor David Turgeman
- Date of birth: 24 October 2003 (age 23)
- Place of birth: Ashdod, Israel
- Height: 1.86 m (6 ft 1 in)
- Position: Forward

Team information
- Current team: New England Revolution
- Number: 99

Youth career
- 2011–2018: Ashdod
- 2018–2021: Maccabi Tel Aviv

Senior career*
Years	Team	Apps	(Gls)
2020–2025	Maccabi Tel Aviv	79	(25)
2021–2022	→ Beitar Tel Aviv Bat Yam (loan)	30	(4)
2025–	New England Revolution	36	(15)

International career^{‡}
2019–2020	Israel U17	8	(1)
2021–2022	Israel U19	17	(5)
2023	Israel U20	6	(2)
2023	Israel U21	7	(2)
2023–	Israel	22	(2)
Medal record
Representing Israel U-19
UEFA European Under-19 Championship
Runner-up	2022 Slovakia	Team
Representing Israel U-20
FIFA U-20 World Cup
Third place	2023 Argentina	Team
- * Club domestic league appearances and goals as of 20:29, 12 November 2026 (UTC) ‡ National team caps and goals as of 20:00, 4 October 2026 (UTC)

Dor David Turgeman (or Turjeman, Hebrew: דור דויד תורג'מן; born 24 October 2003) is an Israeli professional footballer who plays as a forward for the New England Revolution and the Israel national team.

== Early life ==
Turgeman was born and raised in Ashdod, Israel, to an Israeli family Sephardi Jewish (Moroccan-Jewish) descent. His father is Gabi Turgeman. He attended the state-religious (Mamlachti dati) high school Amit in Ashdod.

He began playing for his home-town's F.C. Ashdod's youth team. In 2018 he joined Israeli club Maccabi Tel Aviv.

== Club career ==
=== Maccabi Tel Aviv ===
On 22 August 2020, Turgeman made his senior debut for Maccabi Tel Aviv, appearing in a 2–0 win over Bnei Sakhnin in the Israel Toto Cup (Ligat Ha'Al) tournament.

==== Loan to Beitar Tel Aviv Bat Yam ====
In the summer 2021, Turgeman began a loan spell with Israeli Liga Leumit club Beitar Tel Aviv Bat Yam. He scored his first senior career goal On 1 November 2021, in the 4–2 defeat against to Maccabi Ahi Nazareth.

==== Return to Maccabi Tel Aviv ====
At the end of the season, following the conclusion of his lown spell, Turgeman returned to Maccabi Tel Aviv. He scored his first goal for the senior club On 1 March 2023, in a 2–1 win against Maccabi Petah Tikva.

=== New England Revolution ===
On 20 August 2025, Turgeman signed with the Major League Soccer club New England Revolution. The transfer fee was a reported to be $6 million, with an additional $1 million in performance-related bonuses. He signed a contract through 2028, with a club option for 2029. Turgeman made his MLS debut on 27 September 2025, coming on as a substitute in the 56'th minute of a 2–0 victory over Atlanta United FC . He scored his first MLS career goal in the 72nd minute, and notched his first MLS assist three minutes later, setting up Leonardo Campana's 75' goal. On 18 October Turgeman became the first player in Revolution history (and 10th in MLS history) to score in each of his first three MLS games.

== International career ==
He is a former member Israel national under-19 team, playing through the 2022 UEFA European Under-19 Championship successful campaign, where Israel has finished 2nd. He has also played for the Israel national under-20 team, and the Israel national under-21 team.

During the 2023 FIFA U-20 World Cup, Turgeman scored a goal from a solo run in extra time which sealed a 3–2 win over Brazil and qualification for his country to the semi-finals in their first ever participation in the competition.

== Career statistics ==
=== Club ===
As of match played 20 September 2026

Appearances and goals by club, season and competition
Club	Season	League			National cup (Note: Includes Israel State Cup)		League cup (Note: Includes Toto Cup)		Continental		Other		Total	
Club	Season	Division	Apps	Goals	Apps	Goals	Apps	Goals	Apps	Goals	Apps	Goals	Apps	Goals
Maccabi Tel Aviv	2020–21	Israeli Premier League	1	0	0	0	1	0	0	0	0	0	2	0
Maccabi Tel Aviv	2021–22	Israeli Premier League	0	0	0	0	1	0	0	0	0	0	1	0
Maccabi Tel Aviv	2022–23	Israeli Premier League	11	0	4	1	1	0	0	0	–		16	1
Maccabi Tel Aviv	2023–24	Israeli Premier League	35	9	3	1	1	1	11 (Note: Appearances in UEFA Conference League)	1	–		48	12
Maccabi Tel Aviv	2024–25	Israeli Premier League	32	16	0	0	2	0	11 (Note: Appearances in UEFA Europa League)	4	0	0	45	20
Maccabi Tel Aviv	2025–26	Israeli Premier League	0	0	0	0	1	1	4 (Note: Two appearances in UEFA Champions League, two appearances in UEFA Europa League)	0	1 (Note: Appearance in Israel Super Cup)	0	6	1
Maccabi Tel Aviv	Total		79	25	7	2	7	2	26	5	1	0	120	34
Beitar Tel Aviv Bat Yam (loan)	2021–22	Liga Leumit	30	4	1	0	1	0	–		–		32	4
New England Revolution	2025	Major League Soccer	3	3	–		–		–		–		3	3
New England Revolution	2026	Major League Soccer	26	7	0	0	–		–		–		26	7
New England Revolution	Total		29	10	0	0	–		–		–		29	10
Career total			138	39	8	2	8	2	26	5	1	0	181	48

=== International ===
As of 4 October 2026

Israel
Year	Apps	Goals
2023	5	0
2024	2	0
2025	9	2
2026	6	0
Total	22	2

International goals

As of match played 4 October 2026. Israel score listed first, score column indicates score after each Turgeman goal.

International goals by date, venue, cap, opponent, score, result and competition
No.	Date	Venue	Cap	Opponent	Score	Result	Competition
1	25 March 2025	Nagyerdei Stadion, Debrecen, Hungary	8	Norway	2–4	2–4	2026 FIFA World Cup qualification
2	16 November 2025	Stadionul Zimbru, Chișinău, Moldova	16	Moldova	1–0	4–1	2026 FIFA World Cup qualification

== Honours ==
Maccabi Tel Aviv

- Israeli Premier League: 2023–24, 2024–25
- Israel State Cup: 2020–21
- Toto Cup: 2020–21, 2023–24, 2024–25
- Israel Super Cup: 2020, 2024

== See also ==
- List of Jewish footballers
- List of Jews in sports
- List of Israelis
