= Weslley Patati =

Brazilian footballer (born 2003)

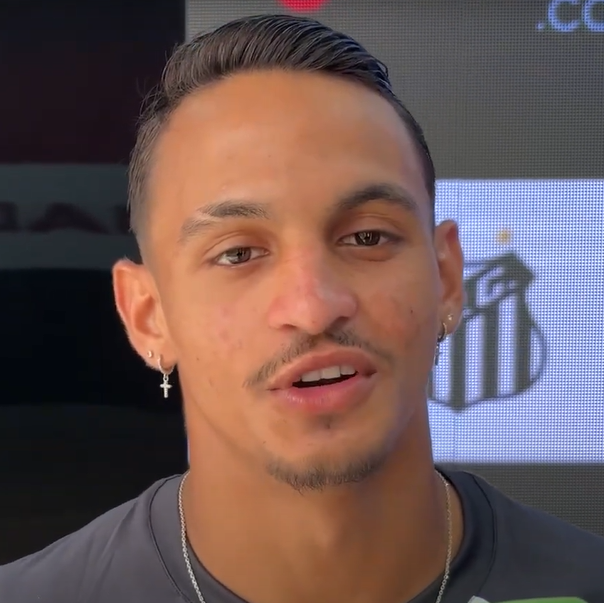
- Patati in 2024

Personal information
- Full name: Weslley Pinto Batista
- Date of birth: 1 October 2003 (age 23)
- Place of birth: Presidente Dutra, Brazil
- Height: 1.67 m (5 ft 6 in)
- Position: Winger

Team information
- Current team: AZ
- Number: 7

Youth career
- Atlético Maranhense
- 2019–2023: Santos

Senior career*
Years	Team	Apps	(Gls)
2022–2024	Santos	29	(2)
2024–2025	Maccabi Tel Aviv	31	(12)
2025–	AZ	36	(3)

International career
2021	Brazil U18	2	(0)
- * Club domestic league appearances and goals as of 25 October 2026

Weslley Pinto Batista (born 1 October 2003), known as Weslley Patati or just Patati, is a Brazilian professional footballer who plays as a winger for Eredivisie club AZ.

== Early life ==
Known as just Weslley at the time, he was born in Presidente Dutra, Maranhão, and began playing for local amateur sides. Due to not having money to buy himself boots, he borrowed ones from other people to play; as they were much bigger than his foot, he was often called Patati, a Brazilian clown from duo Patati Patatá.

== Club career ==
=== Early career ===
Patati played for local side Clube Atlético Maranhense before receiving an invitation to play for a club in Jataí, Goiás. After arriving in the city, he was abandoned and spent six months playing in a football school, struggling with hunger before returning to his hometown.

=== Santos ===
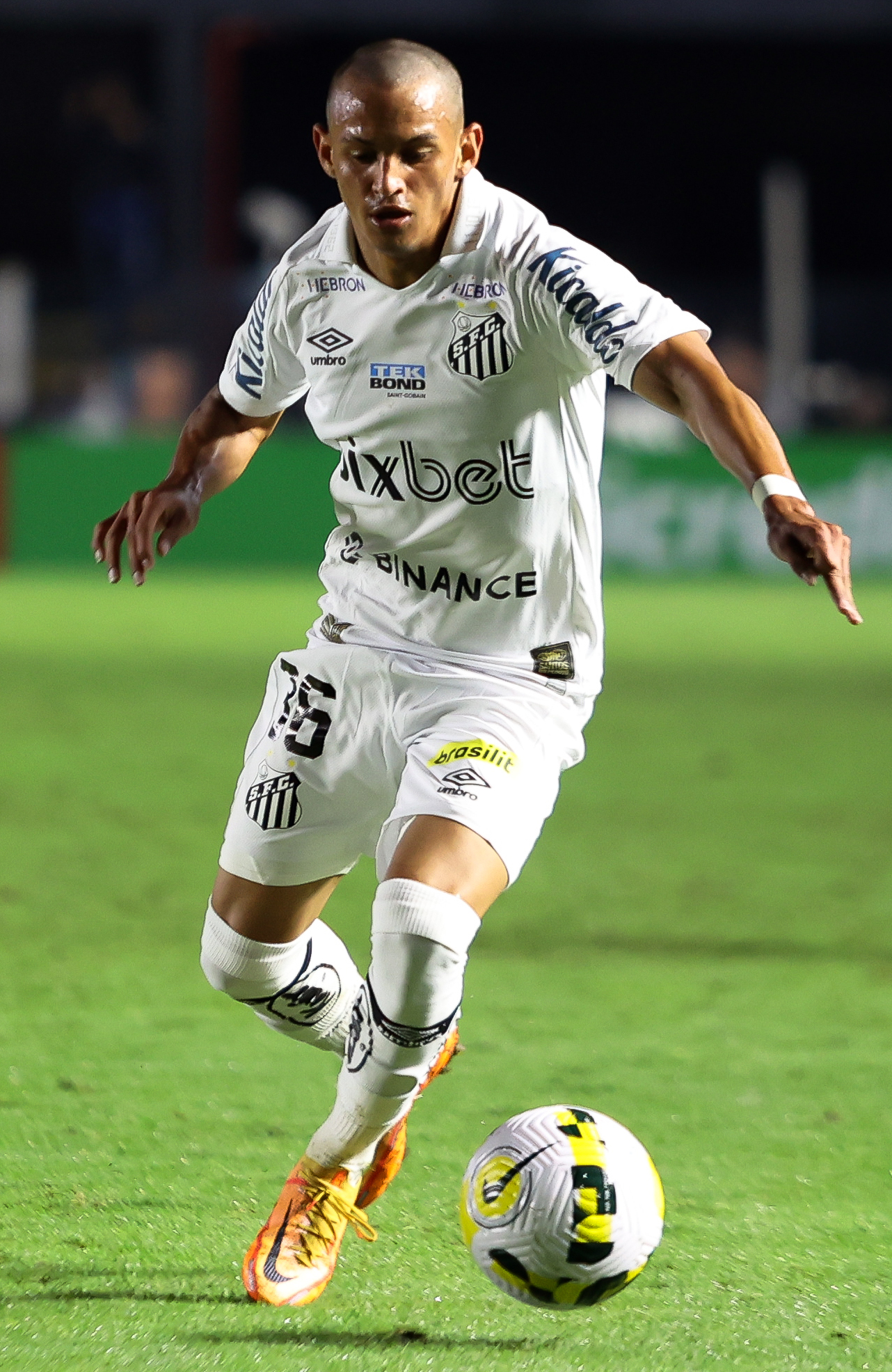
Patati playing for Santos in 2022

In December 2019, after a trial period, Patati signed a youth contract with Santos, being initially assigned to the under-17 team. On 11 January 2020, he signed his first professional contract, after agreeing to a three-year deal.

On 13 January 2022, already a regular with the under-20 squad, Patati renewed his contract until the end of 2024. He made his first team debut on 13 July, coming on as a second-half substitute for fellow youth graduate Ângelo in a 1–0 home win over Corinthians (4–1 aggregate loss), for the year's Copa do Brasil.

Patati made his Série A debut on 20 July 2022, replacing Léo Baptistão in a 2–0 home win over Botafogo. On 2 October 2023, he renewed his contract until September 2026.

Patati scored his first professional goal on 19 May 2024, netting the opener in a 4–0 Série B home routing of Brusque.

=== Maccabi Tel Aviv ===
On 4 September 2024, Santos confirmed the transfer of Patati to Israeli Premier League side Maccabi Tel Aviv, with the player signing a three-year contract. Patati scored his debut goal on 10 November 2024 in a 4–0 league win over Bnei Sakhnin.

=== AZ ===
On 28 August 2025, Patati signed a five-year contract with Eredivisie club AZ Alkmaar.

== Career statistics ==
As of match played 25 October 2026

Appearances and goals by club, season and competition
Club	Season	League			State league (Note: Includes Campeonato Paulista)		National cup (Note: Includes Copa do Brasil, Israel State Cup, KNVB Cup)		Continental		Other		Total	
Club	Season	Division	Apps	Goals	Apps	Goals	Apps	Goals	Apps	Goals	Apps	Goals	Apps	Goals
Santos	2021	Série A	0	0	—		—		—		2 (Note: Appearances in Copa Paulista)	0	2	0
Santos	2022	Série A	1	0	0	0	1	0	0	0	—		2	0
Santos	2023	Série A	9	0	—		1	0	2 (Note: Appearances in Copa Sudamericana)	0	—		12	0
Santos	2024	Série B	13	2	6	0	—		—		—		19	2
Santos	Total		23	2	6	0	2	0	2	0	2	0	35	2
Maccabi Tel Aviv	2024–25	Israeli Premier League	31	12	—		1	0	7 (Note: Appearances in UEFA Europa League)	1	0	0	39	13
Maccabi Tel Aviv	2025–26	Israeli Premier League	0	0	—		0	0	4 (Note: Two appearances in UEFA Champions League, two appearances in UEFA Europa League)	0	1 (Note: Appearance in Israel Super Cup)	1	5	1
Maccabi Tel Aviv	Total		31	12	0	0	1	0	11	1	1	1	44	14
AZ	2025–26	Eredivisie	27	2	—		3	0	14 (Note: Two appearances in UEFA Champions League, two appearances in UEFA Europa League, seven appearances in UEFA Conference League)	0	—		44	2
AZ	2026–27	Eredivisie	9	1	—		0	0	3	2	1 (Note: Appearance in Johan Cruyff Shield)	1	13	4
AZ	Total		36	3	—		3	0	17	2	1	1	57	6
Career total			90	17	8	0	4	0	30	3	4	2	136	22

== Honours ==
AZ

- KNVB Cup: 2025–26
- Johan Cruyff Shield: 2026
