= Muhammad Abu Rumi =

Israeli association footballer (born 2004)

Personal information
- Full name: Muhammad Abu Rumi
- Date of birth: 1 March 2004 (age 22)
- Place of birth: Tamra, Israel
- Height: 1.84 m (6 ft 1/2 in)
- Position: Forward

Team information
- Current team: Hapoel Be'er Sheva
- Number: 87

Youth career
- 2012–2014: Hapoel Haifa
- 2014–2015: Maccabi Haifa
- 2015–2019: Hapoel Haifa
- 2019–2020: FC Neve Yosef
- 2020–2023: Ironi Kiryat Shmona

Senior career*
| Years | Team | Apps | (Gls) |
| 2022–2026 | Ironi Kiryat Shmona | 71 | (14) |
| 2026– | Hapoel Be'er Sheva | 16 | (1) |

International career^{‡}
| 2023– | Israel U21 | 13 | (2) |
- * Club domestic league appearances and goals as of 10:30, 19 October 2026 (UTC) ‡ National team caps and goals as of 20:50, 20 May 2026 (UTC)

Muhammad Abu Rumi (Arabic: محمد أبو رومي, Hebrew: מוחמד אבו רומי; born 1 March 2004) is an Israeli professional footballer who plays as a forward for Israeli Premier League club Hapoel Be'er Sheva and the Israel U21.

== Early life ==
Abu Rumi was born in Tamra, Israel, to a Muslim-Arab family.

His twin brother, youth footballer Hisham Abu Rumi, was loaned to Akhi Nazareth. In 2022, he was seriously injured in a road accident after being struck by a private vehicle while crossing the main road in their hometown of Tamra on his way to training.

== Club career ==
=== Hapoel Be'er Sheva ===
On 9 February 2026, Abu Rumi signed a three-and-a-half-year contract with Hapoel Be'er Sheva after being transferred from Ironi Kiryat Shmona for a fee of 1.7 million NIS. As part of the agreement, Ironi Kiryat Shmona retained approximately 20% of any future transfer fee. On 14 February, Abu Rumi made his debut in a 2–1 victory over FC Ashdod in the Israeli Premier League, the match was played at Yud-Alef Stadium.

== International career ==
Abu Rumi was called up to the Israel U21 by head coach Guy Luzon ahead of the 2023 UEFA European Under-21 Championship.

== Honours ==
Hapoel Beer Sheva

- Israeli Premier League: 2025–26

== See also ==
- List of Israelis
- List of Israel international footballers
