= Hisham Layous =

Israeli footballer (born 2000)

Personal information
- Full name: Hisham Layous
- Date of birth: 13 November 2000 (age 26)
- Place of birth: Mi'ilya, Israel
- Height: 1.75 m (5 ft 9 in)
- Positions: Forward; winger

Team information
- Current team: Levadiakos (on loan from Maccabi Tel Aviv)
- Number: 7

Youth career
- 2008–2011: Beitar Nahariya
- 2011–2013: Maccabi Haifa
- 2013–2014: Hapoel Mate Asher
- 2014–2015: Hapoel Acre
- 2015–2017: F.C. Meilya
- 2017–2019: Bnei Sakhnin

Senior career*
Years	Team	Apps	(Gls)
2019–2020	Karpaty Lviv	6	(0)
2020–2021	Rukh Lviv	0	(0)
2021–2022	F.C. Kafr Qasim	51	(10)
2022–2024	Hapoel Tel Aviv	53	(5)
2024–	Maccabi Tel Aviv	13	(1)
2025–	→ Levadiakos (loan)	22	(4)

International career
2021–2023	Israel U21	9	(0)
- * Club domestic league appearances and goals as of 10 May 2026

Hisham Layous (Arabic: هشام ليوس, Hebrew: השאם ליוס / הישאם לאיוס; born 13 November 2000) is an Israeli professional footballer who plays as a forward for Greek Super League club Levadiakos, on loan from Maccabi Tel Aviv.

== Early life ==
Layous was born in Mi'ilya, Israel, to an Arab-Christian family.

== Career ==
Layous is a product of the different Israeli football youth sportive systems.

He signed contract with a Ukrainian side Karpaty Lviv in July 2019 and made his debut for FC Karpaty as a second half-time substituted player in a home losing game against FC Dynamo Kyiv on 31 July 2019 in the Ukrainian Premier League.
