= Nemanja Stojić =

Serbian footballer

Nemanja Stojić Немања Стојић
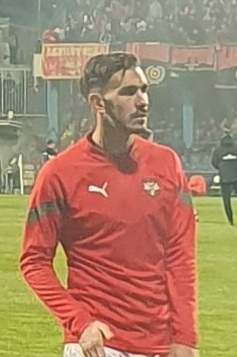
- Stojić with Serbia in 2023

Personal information
- Date of birth: 15 January 1998 (age 28)
- Place of birth: Belgrade, FR Yugoslavia
- Height: 1.90 m (6 ft 3 in)
- Position: Centre-back

Team information
- Current team: Sochi
- Number: 44

Youth career
- Partizan
- 2016–2017: Vozdovac

Senior career*
Years	Team	Apps	(Gls)
2017–2021	Red Star Belgrade	0	(0)
2017–2020	→ Grafičar Beograd (loan)	80	(11)
2020	→ Zlatibor Čajetina (loan)	4	(0)
2020–2021	→ Grafičar Beograd (loan)	21	(3)
2021–2022	Metalac Gornji Milanovac	36	(5)
2022–2024	TSC	66	(4)
2024	Red Star Belgrade	4	(0)
2024–2025	Maccabi Tel Aviv	33	(5)
2025–	Sochi	25	(0)

International career^{‡}
2023–	Serbia	4	(0)
- * Club domestic league appearances and goals as of 11 November 2026 ‡ National team caps and goals as of 10 June 2025

Nemanja Stojić (Serbian Cyrillic: Немања Стојић; born 15 January 1998) is a Serbian professional footballer who plays as a center back for Russian club Sochi and the Serbia national team.

== Club career ==
On 31 August 2025, Stojić signed a three-year contract with Russian Premier League club Sochi.

== International career ==
Stojić made his debut for the Serbia national football team on 25 January 2023 in a friendly match against the United States. Serbia won the game 2–1.

Stojić was selected in Serbia's squad for the UEFA Euro 2024, but didn't make any appearances in the tournament.

== Career statistics ==
=== International ===
As of 10 June 2025

Serbia
Year	Apps	Goals
2023	1	0
2024	2	0
2025	1	0
Total	4	0

== Honours ==
=== Club ===
Red Star Belgrade

- Serbian SuperLiga: 2024–25

Maccabi Tel Aviv

- Israeli Premier League: 2024–25

=== Individual ===
- Serbian SuperLiga Team of the Season: 2023–24
