= Henry Addo =

Ghanaian footballer

Personal information
- Date of birth: 1 May 2003 (age 23)
- Place of birth: Ghana
- Height: 1.80 m (5 ft 11 in)
- Position: Left winger

Team information
- Current team: Tondela
- Number: 10

Youth career
- –2021: Žilina Africa
- 2021–2022: Žilina

Senior career*
| Years | Team | Apps | (Gls) |
| 2021–2024 | Žilina | 22 | (6) |
| 2024–2026 | Maccabi Tel Aviv | 16 | (1) |
| 2025–2026 | → OFK Beograd (loan) | 15 | (2) |
| 2026– | Tondela | 0 | (0) |
- * Club domestic league appearances and goals as of 12 September 2026

Henry Addo (born 1 May 2003) is a Ghanaian professional footballer who plays as a left winger for Liga Portugal 2 club Tondela.

== Club career ==
=== MŠK Žilina ===
A graduate of the Ghanaian football academy MŠK Žilina Africa, which is part of the Slovak club Žilina. In October 2021, he moved to the Slovak club, where he joined the youth team in the under-19 age category, going to play in the UEFA Youth League. In February 2022, the footballer began to get ready for matches with the main team. Addo made his Fortuna Liga debut for Žilina at pod Čebraťom against Ružomberok on 14 February 2022. He was featured in the starting-XI and was replaced by Tibor Slebodník after 61 minutes of play with Šošoni losing 3–1. Žilina lost the game 5–1.
