= Ofek Melika =

Israeli footballer

Personal information
- Full name: Ofek Melika-Aharon
- Date of birth: 23 January 2005 (age 21)
- Place of birth: Givatayim, Israel
- Height: 1.87 m (6 ft 2 in)
- Position: Goalkeeper

Team information
- Current team: Maccabi Tel Aviv
- Number: 22

Youth career
- 2012–2019: Hapoel Ramat Gan
- 2019–2023: Hapoel Ra'anana
- 2023–2024: Maccabi Petah Tikva

Senior career*
Years	Team	Apps	(Gls)
2022–2023	Hapoel Ra'anana	11	(0)
2023–2024	Maccabi Petah Tikva	0	(0)
2024–	Maccabi Tel Aviv	26	(0)

International career^{‡}
2021–2022	Israel U17	9	(0)
2022–2024	Israel U19	18	(0)
2023	Israel U20	1	(0)
2025–	Israel U21	1	(0)
Medal record
Representing Israel U-20
FIFA U-20 World Cup
Third place	2023 Argentina	Team
- * Club domestic league appearances and goals as of 23 June 2026 ‡ National team caps and goals as of 4 June 2023

Ofek Melika-Aharon (Hebrew: אופק מליקה-אהרון; born 23 January 2005) is an Israeli professional footballer who plays as a goalkeeper for Israeli club Maccabi Tel Aviv and the Israel national under-19 team.

== Early life ==
Melika-Aharon was born and raised in Givatayim, Israel, to an Israeli family of Mizrahi Jewish descent. He hails from a family of Israeli football goalkeepers, with his grandfather Shmuel Malika-Aharon and uncle Meir Melika, both playing for the Israel national team. He is also the son of Yaron Melika, who played as a goalkeeper in the Israeli Premier League.

== Club career ==
Melika made his senior debut for Hapoel Ra'anana on 4 April 2022, playing 90 minutes in a Liga Leumit away match against Hapoel Ramat Gan, that ended in a 2–1 win.

In June 2023, he signed a 3-year contract with Maccabi Petah Tikva. He played for the youth team while simultaneously serving as the third goalkeeper for the senior squad."

On 22 May 2024 signed for 5 years in Maccabi Tel Aviv.

== International career ==
He is a youth International for Israel, who plays for the under-17 national team since 2021.

== Career statistics ==
=== Club ===
As of match played 27 August 2026.

Appearances and goals by club, season and competition
Club	Season	League			State Cup		Toto Cup		Continental		Other		Total	
Club	Season	Division	Apps	Goals	Apps	Goals	Apps	Goals	Apps	Goals	Apps	Goals	Apps	Goals
Hapoel Ra'anana	2021–22	Liga Leumit	1	0	0	0	0	0	—		—		1	0
Hapoel Ra'anana	2022–23	Liga Alef	10	0	1	0	0	0	—		—		11	0
Hapoel Ra'anana	Total		11	0	1	0	0	0	—		—		12	0
Maccabi Petah Tikva	2023–24	Israeli Premier League	0	0	0	0	0	0	—		—		0	0
Maccabi Tel Aviv	2024–25	Israeli Premier League	1	0	0	0	0	0	0	0	0	0	1	0
Maccabi Tel Aviv	2025–26	Israeli Premier League	25	0	3	0	1	0	2 (Note: One appearance in UEFA Champions League, one appearance in UEFA Europa League)	0	0	0	31	0
Maccabi Tel Aviv	2026–27	Israeli Premier League	1	0	0	0	0	0	6 (Note: Four appearances in UEFA Europa League, two appearances in UEFA Conference League)	0	1 (Note: Appearance(s) in Israel Super Cup)	0	8	0
Maccabi Tel Aviv	Total		27	0	3	0	1	0	8	0	1	0	40	0
Career total			38	0	4	0	1	0	8	0	1	0	52	0

== See also ==
- List of Jewish footballers
- List of Jews in sports
- List of Israelis
