= Ido Shahar =

Israeli association footballer

Personal information
- Full name: Ido Shachar
- Date of birth: 20 August 2001 (age 25)
- Place of birth: Gat, Israel
- Height: 1.71 m (5 ft 7 in)
- Position: Midfielder

Team information
- Current team: Maccabi Tel Aviv
- Number: 36

Youth career
- 2011–2012: MS Kiryat Gat
- 2012–2020: Maccabi Tel Aviv

Senior career*
Years	Team	Apps	(Gls)
2019–	Maccabi Tel Aviv	78	(20)
2019–2020	→ Beitar Tel Aviv Bat Yam (loan)	32	(6)
2020–2021	→ Hapoel Haifa (loan)	21	(0)
2022	→ Maccabi Petah Tikva (loan)	15	(4)
2022–2023	→ Apollon Limassol (loan)	25	(2)

International career^{‡}
2016–2017	Israel U16	9	(0)
2017–2018	Israel U17	21	(1)
2018–2019	Israel U18	6	(1)
2019	Israel U19	9	(0)
2020–2023	Israel U21	19	(3)
2026–	Israel	1	(0)
- * Club domestic league appearances and goals as of 23 June 2026 ‡ National team caps and goals as of 20:00, 3 June 2026 (UTC)

Ido Shahar (also spelled Shachar, Hebrew: עידו שחר; born 20 August 2001) is an Israeli professional footballer who plays as a midfielder for Israeli Premier League club Maccabi Tel Aviv and the Israel national team.

== Early life ==
Shachar was born and raised in the kibbutz Gat, Israel, to an Israeli family of Ashkenazi Jewish (Hungarian-Jewish) descent.

He also holds a Hungarian passport, on account of his Ashkenazi Jewish ancestors, which eases the move to certain European football leagues.

== Club career ==
Shahar was born and raised in Kibbutz Gat in the south. He began playing football in the children's team of F.C. Kiryat Gat, and at the age of 11, he joined the youth department of Maccabi Tel Aviv. In the summer of 2019, he was loaned to Beitar Tel Aviv Bat Yam from the Liga Leumit (National League). On August 22, 2019, he made his debut for the team in a 2–2 draw against Hapoel Ramat HaSharon. On November 29, he scored his debut goal for the team in a 3–2 victory over Hapoel Petah Tikva.

In the summer of 2020, he joined Hapoel Haifa from the Israeli Premier League, where he made 21 league appearances. In the summer of 2021, he returned to Maccabi Tel Aviv, making 3 Premier League appearances and scoring one goal in a 3–1 win against Hapoel Jerusalem. On January 19, 2022, he extended his contract with Maccabi Tel Aviv and was loaned to Maccabi Petah Tikva until the end of the season. Playing for Maccabi Petah Tikva, he scored 4 goals in 15 appearances, although at the end of the season, the team was relegated to the Liga Leumit.

In the summer of 2022, he was loaned to Apollon Limassol from the Cypriot First Division until the end of the season. On August 3, 2022, he made his debut for the Cypriot team in their 0–4 defeat to Maccabi Haifa during the UEFA Champions League qualifiers. after his loan spell at Apollon Limassol, Shahar returned to Maccabi Tel Aviv and began to secure a much more significant role within the squad. During the 2023/2024 season, under manager Robbie Keane, he showcased great versatility. In addition to his natural position in the midfield, he was frequently deployed as a right-back and delivered impressive performances. That season, he was an active contributor to the team winning the Israeli Premier League championship and the Toto Cup.

== Honours ==
=== Club ===
Maccabi Tel Aviv

- Israel Toto Cup (Ligat Ha'Al): 2020–21
- Israel Super Cup: 2020

Apollon Limassol

- Cypriot Super Cup: 2022

== See also ==
- List of Jewish footballers
- List of Jews in sports
- List of Israelis
- List of Israel international footballers
