= Elad Madmon =

Israeli footballer

Personal information
- Date of birth: 10 February 2004 (age 22)
- Place of birth: Netanya, Israel
- Height: 1.75 m (5 ft 9 in)
- Position: Forward

Team information
- Current team: Maccabi Tel Aviv
- Number: 19

Youth career
- 2011–2017: Beitar Nes Tubruk
- 2017–2018: Maccabi Netanya
- 2018–2023: Hapoel Hadera

Senior career*
Years	Team	Apps	(Gls)
2023–2024	Hapoel Hadera	38	(12)
2024–	Maccabi Tel Aviv	53	(6)

International career^{‡}
2022–2023	Israel U19	4	(0)
2024–	Israel U21	6	(1)
2024–	Israel	1	(0)
- * Club domestic league appearances and goals as of 23 June 2026 ‡ National team caps and goals as of 27 June 2025

Elad Madmon (Hebrew: אלעד מדמון; born 10 February 2004) is an Israeli footballer who plays as a forward for Maccabi Tel Aviv and the Israel national team.

== International career ==
Madmon made his debut for the Israel national team on 14 October 2024 in a UEFA Nations League game against Italy at Stadio Friuli. He started and played 64 minutes, as Italy won 4–1.

== Career statistics ==
=== Club ===
As of 15 November 2024.

Club	Season	League			State Cup		Toto Cup		Continental		Other		Total	
Club	Season	Division	Apps	Goals	Apps	Goals	Apps	Goals	Apps	Goals	Apps	Goals	Apps	Goals
Hapoel Hadera	2022–23	Israeli Premier League	7	0	0	0	0	0	–		0	0	7	0
Hapoel Hadera	2023–24	Israeli Premier League	31	12	1	0	5	0	–		0	0	37	12
Hapoel Hadera	Total		38	12	1	0	5	0	0	0	0	0	44	12
Maccabi Tel Aviv	2024–25	Israeli Premier League	8	2	0	0	1	0	6	1	0	0	15	3
Maccabi Tel Aviv	Total		8	2	0	0	1	0	6	1	0	0	15	3
Career total			46	14	1	0	6	0	6	1	0	0	59	15

== Honours ==
Individual

- Player of the month in the Israeli Premier League: December 2023
