= Tyrese Asante =

Dutch footballer (born 2002)

Personal information
- Date of birth: 9 April 2002 (age 24)
- Place of birth: The Hague, Netherlands
- Height: 1.88 m (6 ft 2 in)
- Position: Centre-back

Team information
- Current team: Maccabi Tel Aviv
- Number: 6

Youth career
- –2013: Feyenoord
- 2013–2018: Sparta Rotterdam
- 2018–2020: HV & CV Quick

Senior career*
Years	Team	Apps	(Gls)
2020–2021	HV & CV Quick	5	(0)
2021–2024	ADO Den Haag	89	(3)
2024–	Maccabi Tel Aviv	59	(3)

International career^{‡}
2023–	Netherlands U21	6	(0)
- * Club domestic league appearances and goals as of 05:44, 27 May 2026 (UTC) ‡ National team caps and goals as of 25 March 2025

Tyrese Asante (born 9 April 2002) is a Dutch professional footballer who plays a centre-back for Israeli Premier League club Maccabi Tel Aviv.

== Career ==
Asante left HV & CV Quick for city rivals ADO Den Haag in the summer of 2021. He made his ADO debut on 8 August 2021, in a 2–0 home win against Jong Ajax. Primarily a right back, Asante can also play centre back and got some minutes for ADO Den Haag in midfield during the 2021–22 season. Ahead of the 2022–23 season Asante was given the number 2 shirt number, and a new contract until 2025. On 29 September 2022 Asante scored his first professional goal as his team lost 3–1 at home to Jong PSV in the Eerste Divisie.

=== Maccabi Tel Aviv ===
On 8 July 2024 signed for 3 years to the Israeli Premier League club Maccabi Tel Aviv. Asante scored his debut goal on 31 August 2024 in a 5–1 win over TSC Bačka Topola in the second play-off match of the 2024–25 UEFA Europa League qualifiers.

== Personal life ==
Born in the Netherlands, Asante is of Ghanaian descent.

== Career statistics ==
=== Club ===
As of 15 November 2024

Appearances and goals by club, season and competition
Club	Season	League			National cup		Europe		Other		Total	
Club	Season	Division	Apps	Goals	Apps	Goals	Apps	Goals	Apps	Goals	Apps	Goals
HV & CV Quick	2020–21	Derde Divisie	5	0	1	0	—		—		6	0
ADO Den Haag	2021–22	Eerste Divisie	29	0	1	0	—		—		30	0
ADO Den Haag	2022–23	Eerste Divisie	34	3	2	0	—		—		36	3
ADO Den Haag	2023–24	Eerste Divisie	26	0	1	0	—		4 (Note: Appearances in Eredivisie promotion/relegation play-offs)	0	31	0
ADO Den Haag	Total		89	3	4	0	—		4	0	97	3
Maccabi Tel Aviv	2024–25	Israeli Premier League	9	0	0	0	7	1	1	0	18	1
Maccabi Tel Aviv	Total		9	0	0	0	7	1	1	0	18	1
Career total			103	3	5	0	7	1	5	0	121	4
