= 2024 Israel Super Cup =

Football match in Haifa, Israel

Maccabi Tel Aviv	Maccabi Petah Tikva
2	0
- Date: 15 July 2024
- Venue: Bloomfield Stadium, Tel Aviv
- Referee: Orel Grinfeld

The 2024 Israel Super Cup was the 29th edition of the Israel Super Cup (34th, including unofficial matches (Note: The competition wasn't played within the Israel Football Association for its first 6 editions, until 1969.)), an annual Israeli football match played between the winners of the previous season's Israeli Premier League (Maccabi Tel Aviv) and the Israel State Cup (Maccabi Petah Tikva). This was the ninth edition since the Super cup's resumption in 2015.

== Match details ==
15 July 2024
20:00

Maccabi Tel Aviv	2–0	Maccabi Petah Tikva
Zahavi 14'; Hozez 90+4'	Report

Bloomfield Stadium, Tel Aviv
Referee: Orel Grinfeld

Man of the Match:

MATCH OFFICIALS
Assistant referees:
Roy Hasan
Idan Yarkoni
Fourth official:
Ohad Asulin
Video assistant referee:
Eli Hacmon
Assistant video assistant referee:
Dudo Biton

Match rules

- 90 minutes, with 30 minutes extra time if tied, and a Penalty shoot-out, if necessary
- Nine named substitutes, of which up to five may be used
