= Osher Davida =

Israeli footballer

Personal information
- Date of birth: 18 February 2001 (age 25)
- Place of birth: Ashdod, Israel
- Height: 1.76 m (5 ft 9 in)
- Position: Winger

Team information
- Current team: Maccabi Tel Aviv
- Number: 77

Youth career
- 2009–2013: Ashdod
- 2013–2015: Maccabi Tel Aviv
- 2015–2020: Hapoel Tel Aviv

Senior career*
Years	Team	Apps	(Gls)
2019–2022	Hapoel Tel Aviv	74	(11)
2022–2023	Standard Liège	23	(0)
2023–	Maccabi Tel Aviv	94	(14)

International career^{‡}
2017–2018	Israel U17	16	(3)
2018–2019	Israel U18	6	(0)
2019	Israel U19	7	(0)
2020–2023	Israel U21	15	(1)
- * Club domestic league appearances and goals as of 23 June 2026 ‡ National team caps and goals as of 28 November 2022

Osher Davida (Hebrew: אושר דוידה; born 18 February 2001) is an Israeli professional footballer who plays as a winger for Israeli Premier League club Maccabi Tel Aviv.

== Early life ==
Davida was born and raised in Ashdod, Israel, to a family of Jewish background.

== Club career ==
=== Hapoel Tel Aviv ===
In 2015, Davida signed with Israeli Premier League club Hapoel Tel Aviv. On 30 July 2018, He made his senior debut in a 2–3 loss to Ashdod. On 9 November 2020, Davida scored his debut senior goal in the 1–0 win against Hapoel Hadera.

=== Standard Liège ===
On 23 August 2022, Davida signed a four-year contract with Belgian First Division A side Standard Liège.

=== Maccabi Tel Aviv ===
After one year in Belgium, having not registered a single goal or assist, Davida returned to Israel in August 2023, signing a four-year contract with Maccabi Tel Aviv.

== Career statistics ==
=== Club ===
As of 1 July 2021

Club	Season	League			State Cup		Toto Cup		Continental		Other		Total	
Club	Season	Division	Apps	Goals	Apps	Goals	Apps	Goals	Apps	Goals	Apps	Goals	Apps	Goals
Hapoel Tel Aviv	2019–20	Israeli Premier League	9	0	1	0	2	0	0	0	0	0	12	0
Hapoel Tel Aviv	2020–21	Israeli Premier League	30	3	5	0	1	0	0	0	0	0	36	3
Hapoel Tel Aviv	2021–22	Israeli Premier League	34	8	4	0	1	0	0	0	0	0	39	8
Hapoel Tel Aviv	Total		73	11	10	0	4	0	0	0	0	0	87	11
Standard Liège	2022-23	Belgian First Division A	23	0	0	0	0	0	0	0	1	0	24	0
Career total			108	11	10	0	4	0	0	0	1	0	111	11

== See also ==
- List of Jewish footballers
- List of Jews in sports
- List of Israelis
