= 2021–22 F.C. Vizela season =

F.C. Vizela
2021–22 season
- Chairman: Eduardo Guimarães
- Manager: Álvaro Pacheco
- Stadium: Estádio do Futebol Clube de Vizela
- Primeira Liga: 16th
- Taça de Portugal: Quarter-finals
- Taça da Liga: First round
Home colours	Away colours	Third colours

The 2021–22 season is the 52nd season in the existence of F.C. Vizela and the club's first season in the top flight of Portuguese football. In addition to the domestic league, F.C. Vizela participated in this season's editions of the Taça de Portugal and the Taça da Liga.

== Players ==
=== First-team squad ===
As of 31 July 2021

Note: Flags indicate national team as defined under FIFA eligibility rules; some limited exceptions apply. Players may hold more than one non-FIFA nationality.

No.	Pos.	Nation	Player
1	GK	POR	Pedro Silva
2	DF	POR	Hugo Oliveira
3	DF	POR	Bruno Wilson
8	MF	POR	Raphael Guzzo
9	FW	BRA	Cassiano
10	FW	POR	Kiko Bondoso
12	DF	BRA	Marcelo Vilela
13	MF	CIV	Evrard Zag
16	MF	POR	João Pais
17	MF	BRA	Marcos Paulo
19	MF	USA	Alex Mendez
20	MF	POR	Samu
24	DF	POR	Kiki
25	DF	CIV	Mohamed Aidara
28	MF	NGR	Emmanuel Adeyemo
31	GK	GBS	Manuel Baldé

No.	Pos.	Nation	Player
34	FW	POR	João Ricardo
37	DF	GHA	Richard Ofori
39	DF	CIV	Koffi Kouao
54	DF	POR	Gonçalo Cunha
60	DF	NGR	Emmanuel Maviram
77	FW	GHA	Kinglord Safo
79	FW	POR	Nuno Moreira
80	FW	POR	Ventura
81	DF	POR	David Martins
82	FW	POR	Tomás Silva
84	GK	POR	Ivo Gonçalves
87	GK	BRA	Charles
95	FW	BRA	Guilherme Schettine (on loan from Braga)
98	FW	POR	Didi
99	FW	GHA	Francis Cann

=== Other players under contract ===
Note: Flags indicate national team as defined under FIFA eligibility rules; some limited exceptions apply. Players may hold more than one non-FIFA nationality.

No.	Pos.	Nation	Player
—	MF	BRA	Claudemir
—	FW	NGR	Hassan Usman
—	DF	BRA	Igor Julião

No.	Pos.	Nation	Player
—	FW	MLI	Kévin Zohi
—	FW	NGR	Kuku Fidelis

== Pre-season and friendlies ==
Win Draw Loss Fixtures

== Competitions ==
=== Overall record ===
Competition	First match	Last match	Starting round	Final position	Record							
Competition	First match	Last match	Starting round	Final position	Pld	W	D	L	GF	GA	GD	Win %
Primeira Liga	6 August 2021	May 2022	Matchday 1		18	3	7	8	16	30	−14	16.67
Taça de Portugal	17 October 2021	12 January 2022	Third round	Quarter-finals	4	3	0	1	6	3	+3	75.00
Taça da Liga	24 July 2021		First round	First round	1	0	0	1	1	2	−1	0.00
Total					23	6	7	10	23	35	−12	26.09

Last updated: 16 January 2022
Source: Soccerway

=== Primeira Liga ===
==== League table ====
Pos	Team	Pld	W	D	L	GF	GA	GD	Pts	Qualification or relegation
12	Boavista	34	7	17	10	39	52	−13	38 (Note: Head-to-head points: Marítimo 10, Paços de Ferreira 8, Boavista 7, Portimonense 6.)	
13	Portimonense	34	10	8	16	31	45	−14	38	
14	Vizela	34	7	12	15	37	58	−21	33	
15	Arouca	34	7	10	17	30	54	−24	31	
16	Moreirense (R)	34	7	8	19	33	51	−18	29	Qualification for the Relegation play-offs

Source: Liga Portugal
Rules for classification: 1) Points; 2) Head-to-head points; 3) Head-to-head goal difference; 4) Head-to-head away goals scored; 5) Goal difference; 6) Matches won; 7) Goals scored; 8) Play-off.
(R) Relegated

==== Results summary ====
Overall								Home						Away					
Pld	W	D	L	GF	GA	GD	Pts	W	D	L	GF	GA	GD	W	D	L	GF	GA	GD
1	0	0	1	0	3	−3	0	0	0	0	0	0	0	0	0	1	0	3	−3

Last updated: 6 August 2021.
Source: Liga Portugal

==== Results by round ====
Round	1
Ground	A
Result	L
Position	

Updated to match(es) played on 6 August 2021. Source: Liga Portugal
A = Away; H = Home; W = Win; D = Draw; L = Loss

==== Matches ====
6 August 2021 1	Sporting CP	3–0	Vizela	Lisbon
20:15 WEST (UTC+1)	Cabral (penalty missed) 32'; Gonçalves 48', 64'; Palhinha (yellow card) 59'; Paulinho 74'	Report	Samu (yellow card) 13'; Kouao (yellow card) 30'; Silva (yellow card) 90+2'	Stadium: Estádio José Alvalade; Referee: António Nobre

22 August 2021 3	Vitória de Guimarães	4–0	Vizela	Guimarães
20:30 WEST (UTC+1)	André 70' (pen.); Estupiñán 75'; Edwards 82'; Sacko 90+5' (pen.)	Report		Stadium: Estádio D. Afonso Henriques; Attendance: 8,935; Referee: Hugo Miguel

24 October 2021 9	Vizela	0–1	Benfica	Vizela
18:00 WEST (UTC+01:00)	Mendez (yellow card) 41'; Aidara (yellow card) 44'; Kiki (yellow card) 58'	Report	Veríssimo (yellow card) 68'; Radonjić (yellow card) 86'; Everton (yellow card) 90+6'; Silva 90+8'	Stadium: Estádio do FC Vizela; Attendance: 4,883; Referee: Luís Godinho

30 November 2021 12	Braga	4–1	Vizela	Braga
20:15 WET (UTC+0)	R. Horta 27', 45' (pen.); Silva 57'; Ruiz 90+3'	Report	Kouao 72'	Stadium: Estádio Municipal de Braga; Attendance: 5,681; Referee: Vítor Ferreira

19 December 2021 15	Vizela	0–4	Porto	Vizela
19:00 WET (UTC±0)		Report	Luis Díaz 14'; Otávio 19'; Zaidu 47'; Samu 64' (pen.)	Stadium: Estádio do FC Vizela; Attendance: 4,970; Referee: Hélder Malheiro

16 January 2022 18	Vizela	0–2	Sporting CP	Vizela
18:00 WET (UTC±0)		Report	Gonçalves 28'; Bragança 42'	Stadium: Estádio do FC Vizela; Referee: Fábio Veríssimo

11 March 2022 26	Benfica	1–1	Vizela	Lisbon
20:15 WET (UTC±0)	Taarabt (red card) 7'; Núñez (yellow card) 64'; Araújo 75'	Report	Rashid (yellow card) 11'; Wilson (yellow card) 16'; Afonso (yellow card) 45'; Cassiano 65'; Bondoso (yellow card) 78'; Mendez (yellow card) 90+3'; Claudemir (yellow card) 90+5'	Stadium: Estádio da Luz; Attendance: 31,546; Referee: Manuel Oliveira

30 April 2022 32	Porto	4–2	Vizela	Porto
19:00 WEST (UTC+1)	Evanilson 21'; Taremi 28' (pen.), 87'; Mbemba 57'	Report	Mendez 36'; Moreira 49'	Stadium: Estádio do Dragão; Attendance: 46,830; Referee: Manuel Mota

=== Taça de Portugal ===
17 October 2021 Third round	Vitória de Setúbal	0–2	Vizela	Setúbal
14:00 WEST (UTC+1)		Report	Mendez 27'; Schettine 37'	Stadium: Estádio do Bonfim; Referee: Hugo Miguel

20 November 2021 Fourth round	Vizela	2–0	Estrela da Amadora	Vizela
14:00 WET (UTC+0)	Mendez 9'; Bondoso 52'	Report		Stadium: Estádio do FC Vizela; Referee: Luís Godinho

23 December 2021 Fifth round	Vizela	1–0	Braga	Vizela
18:45 WET (UTC+0)	Moreira 9'	Report		Stadium: Estádio do FC Vizela; Referee: Nuno Almeida

12 January 2022 Quarter-finals	Vizela	1–3	Porto	Vizela
20:45 WET (UTC±0)	Cassiano 24'	Report	Uribe 8'; Vieira 64' (pen.); Evanilson 89'	Stadium: Estádio do FC Vizela; Referee: João Pinheiro

=== Taça da Liga ===
24 July 2021 First round	Estrela da Amadora	2–1	Vizela	Amadora
15:30 WEST (UTC+1)	Xavi 15'; Paulinho 89'	Report	Cassiano 66'	Stadium: Estádio José Gomes; Attendance: 0 Referee: David Silva
