= 2022–23 F.C. Vizela season =

F.C. Vizela
2022–23 season
- Chairman: Eduardo Guimarães
- Manager: Álvaro Pacheco
- Stadium: Estádio do FC Vizela
- Primeira Liga: 11th
- Taça de Portugal: Fourth round
- Taça da Liga: Group stage
- Top goalscorer: League: Milutin Osmajić (8); All: Milutin Osmajić (8)

The 2022–23 season was the 84th in the history of F.C. Vizela and their second consecutive season in the top flight. The club participated in the Primeira Liga, the Taça de Portugal, and the Taça da Liga.

== Players ==
As of 2 August 2022

Note: Flags indicate national team as defined under FIFA eligibility rules; some limited exceptions apply. Players may hold more than one non-FIFA nationality.

No.	Pos.	Nation	Player
1	GK	POR	Pedro Silva
3	DF	POR	Bruno Wilson
4	DF	CPV	Ivanildo Fernandes
5	DF	BRA	Anderson
6	MF	BRA	Claudemir
8	MF	POR	Raphael Guzzo
9	FW	BRA	Cassiano
10	FW	POR	Kiko Bondoso
14	DF	BRA	Igor Julião
17	MF	BRA	Diego Rosa (on loan from Manchester City)
19	MF	USA	Alex Mendez
20	MF	POR	Samu
22	FW	MLI	Kévin Zohi
23	MF	IRQ	Osama Rashid

No.	Pos.	Nation	Player
24	DF	POR	Kiki
25	DF	CIV	Mohamed Aidara
29	MF	COL	Andrés Sarmiento
31	GK	GBS	Manuel Baldé
37	DF	GHA	Richard Ofori
39	DF	CIV	Koffi Kouao
60	DF	NGR	Emmanuel Maviram
70	MF	USA	Alex Alvarado
79	FW	POR	Nuno Moreira
84	GK	POR	Ivo Gonçalves
90	FW	NGR	Friday Etim
97	GK	CRO	Fabijan Buntić
99	FW	GHA	Francis Cann

=== Out on loan ===
Note: Flags indicate national team as defined under FIFA eligibility rules; some limited exceptions apply. Players may hold more than one non-FIFA nationality.

No.	Pos.	Nation	Player
—	DF	BRA	Marcelo Vilela (at Oliveira do Hospital)
—	MF	POR	João Pais (at Oliveira do Hospital)

No.	Pos.	Nation	Player
—	MF	POR	Tomás Silva (at Varzim)

== Transfers ==
=== In ===
No.	Pos.	Player	Transferred from	Fee	Date	Source
	GK	(Croatia) Fabijan Buntić	(Germany) Ingolstadt 04	Undisclosed	2 July 2022	
	MF	(Brazil) Diego Rosa	(England) Manchester City	Loan	7 July 2022	

== Pre-season and friendlies ==
Win Draw Loss Fixtures

9 July 2022 Friendly	Vizela (Portugal)	2–3	(Portugal) Braga	Apúlia e Fão
10:00 WEST (UTC+1)	Cunha 2'; Bondoso 36'		Ruiz 49'; Moura 55'; Schürrle 81' (pen.)	Stadium: Centro Desportivo de Fão

12 July 2022 Friendly	Vizela (Portugal)	6–0	(Portugal) Vizela U23	Vila das Aves
--:-- WEST (UTC+1)	Moreira 13'; Oliveira 24'; Zohi 30'; Samu 37'; Kiki 42'; Cann			Attendance: 100

15 July 2022 Friendly	Vizela (Portugal)	1–3	(Portugal) Torreense	Vizela
10:30 WEST (UTC+1)	João Ricardo 60'		Mateus 15'; Simão Rocha 75'; João Oliveira 80'	Stadium: Estádio do FC Vizela

16 July 2022 Friendly	Famalicão (Portugal)	1–2	(Portugal) Vizela	Vila Nova de Famalicão
10:00 WEST (UTC+1)	Lima 45'		Mendez 30'; Samu 65'	Stadium: Campo nº2 Attendance: 0

19 July 2022 Friendly	Oliveirense (Portugal)	2–1	(Portugal) Vizela	Figueira da Foz
10:30 WEST (UTC+1)	Obi; Guirassy		Zohi

23 July 2022 Friendly	Vizela (Portugal)	0–1	(Portugal) Académico de Viseu	Praia de Quiaios
10:30 WEST (UTC+1)			Clóvis	Stadium: Centro de Estágio Rosa Náutica

23 July 2022 Friendly	Feirense (Portugal)	3–0	(Portugal) Vizela	Santa Maria da Feira
15:30 WEST (UTC+1)

27 July 2022 Friendly	Vizela (Portugal)	2–3	(Portugal) Gil Vicente	Caldas de Vizela
09:00 WEST (UTC+1)				Stadium: Campo de Treinos do Futebol Clube de Vizela

30 July 2022 Friendly	Penafiel (Portugal)	2–0	(Portugal) Vizela	Penafiel
10:00 WEST (UTC+1)	Loureiro; Roberto			Stadium: Estádio Municipal 25 de Abril

30 July 2022 Solverde Cup	Paços de Ferreira (Portugal)	1–2	(Portugal) Vizela	Paços de Ferreira
18:00 WEST (UTC+1)	Uilton 90+2'		Mendez 22'; Moreira 82'	Stadium: Estádio da Mata Real

== Competitions ==
=== Overall record ===
Competition	First match	Last match	Starting round	Record							
Competition	First match	Last match	Starting round	Pld	W	D	L	GF	GA	GD	Win %
Primeira Liga	6 August 2022	May 2023	Matchday 1	9	3	2	4	7	9	−2	33.33
Taça de Portugal				0	0	0	0	0	0	+0	—
Taça da Liga				0	0	0	0	0	0	+0	—
Total				9	3	2	4	7	9	−2	33.33

Last updated: 9 October 2022
Source: Soccerway

=== Primeira Liga ===
==== League table ====
Pos	Team	Pld	W	D	L	GF	GA	GD	Pts
9	Boavista	34	12	8	14	43	54	−11	44
10	Casa Pia	34	11	8	15	31	40	−9	41
11	Vizela	34	11	7	16	34	38	−4	40 (Note: Vizela finished ahead of Rio Ave on head-to-head points: Rio Ave 0–1 Vizela, Vizela 3–1 Rio Ave.)
12	Rio Ave	34	10	10	14	36	43	−7	40
13	Gil Vicente	34	10	7	17	32	41	−9	37

Source: Liga Portugal
Rules for classification: 1) Points; 2) Head-to-head points; 3) Head-to-head goal difference; 4) Goal difference; 5) Matches won; 6) Goals scored; 7) Play-off.

==== Results summary ====
Overall								Home						Away					
Pld	W	D	L	GF	GA	GD	Pts	W	D	L	GF	GA	GD	W	D	L	GF	GA	GD
34	11	7	16	34	38	−4	40	5	4	8	18	19	−1	6	3	8	16	19	−3

Last updated: 26 May 2023.
Source: Liga Portugal

==== Results by round ====
Round	1	2	3	4	5	6	7	8	9	10	11	12	13	14	15	16	17	18	19	20	21	22	23	24	25	26	27	28	29	30	31	32	33	34
Ground	A	H	A	H	A	H	A	H	A	H	A	H	A	H	A	H	A	H	A	H	A	H	A	H	A	H	A	H	A	H	A	H	A	H
Result	W	L	D	D	L	L	L	W	W	L	D	L	W	W	L	W	L	W	L	D	D	L	W	L	W	W	W	D	L	L	L	D	L	L
Position	4	10	12	11	12	13	14	14	12	13	12	13	13	12	13	9	10	8	10	10	8	11	9	11	10	8	7	7	8	9	11	11	11	11

Updated to match(es) played on 26 May 2023. Source: Liga Portugal
A = Away; H = Home; W = Win; D = Draw; L = Loss

==== Matches ====
The league fixtures were announced on 5 July 2022.

6 August 2022 1	Rio Ave	0–1	Vizela	Vila do Conde
15:30 WEST (UTC+1)		Report	Moreira 66'	Stadium: Estádio dos Arcos; Referee: Gustavo Correia

14 August 2022 2	Vizela	0–1	Porto	Vizela
18:00 WEST (UTC+1)	Diego Rosa (yellow card) 31'; Nuno Moreira (yellow card) 48'; Samu (yellow card) 56'; Buntić (yellow card) 68'; Kiki (yellow card) 73'; Osama Rashid (yellow card) 89'	Report	João Mário (yellow card) 45'; Pepe (yellow card) 62'; Iván Marcano 90'	Stadium: Estádio do Futebol Clube de Vizela; Attendance: 4,679; Referee: (Portugal) Fábio Veríssimo

20 August 2022 3	Chaves	1–1	Vizela	Chaves
18:00 WEST (UTC+1)	Héctor Hernández 8'; Vitória (yellow card) 16'; João Teixeira (yellow card) 62' (yellow-red card) 71'; Juninho (yellow card) 68'; Hélder Morim (yellow card) 80'	Report	Raphael Guzzo (yellow card) 21'; Zohi 40' (yellow card) 85'; Sarmiento (red card) 78'; Claudemir (yellow card) 90'; Kiko Bondoso (yellow card) 90+4'; Carlos Isaac (yellow card) 90+7'	Stadium: Estádio Municipal Eng. Manuel Branco Teixeira; Attendance: 5,489; Referee: (Portugal) Rui Costa

29 August 2022 4	Vizela	2–2	Gil Vicente	Vizela
21:15 WEST (UTC+1)	Raphael Guzzo (yellow card) 7'; Kiki (yellow card) 28'; Kiko Bondoso 45'; Anderson 45+5'	Report	Fran Navarro 8' (pen.); Boselli 26' (yellow card) 70'; Pedro Tiba (yellow card) 39'; Lucas Cunha (yellow card) 45+2'; Aburjania (yellow card) 66'; Adrián Marín (yellow card) 90+1'	Stadium: Estádio do Futebol Clube de Vizela; Attendance: 2,824; Referee: (Portugal) Manuel Oliveira

2 September 2022 5	Benfica	2–1	Vizela	Lisbon
19:00 WEST (UTC+1)	Otamendi (yellow card) 42'; Fernández (yellow card) 51'; David Neres 76'; João Mário (yellow card) 82' (yellow-red card) 90+13' (goal) 90+12' (pen.); Aursnes (yellow card) 84'; Gonçalo Ramos (yellow card) 89' (yellow-red card) 90+1'	Report	Osmajić 20'; Raphael Guzzo (yellow card) 26'; Tomás Silva (yellow card) 45+1'; Mendez (yellow card) 86'; Diego Rosa (yellow card) 90+9'	Stadium: Estádio da Luz; Attendance: 47,958; Referee: (Portugal) Fábio Veríssimo

12 September 2022 6	Vizela	0–1	Estoril	Vizela
20:15 WEST (UTC+1)	Tomás Silva (yellow card) 25' (yellow-red card) 73'; Kiki (yellow card) 44'; Claudemir (yellow card) 90'	Report	Pedro Álvaro (yellow card) 10'; Ericson 28'; Joãozinho (yellow card) 39'; Tiago Gouveia (yellow card) 41'; Francisco Geraldes (yellow card) 81'	Stadium: Estádio do Futebol Clube de Vizela; Attendance: 2,335; Referee: (Portugal) Manuel Mota

18 September 2022 7	Braga	2–0	Vizela	Braga
20:30 WEST (UTC+1)	André Horta (yellow card) 11'; Račić (yellow card) 24'; Banza (yellow card) 72'; Vitinha 83'; Matheus (yellow card) 89'; Álvaro Djaló (yellow card) 89'; Lainez (yellow card) 90+1'; Ricardo Horta 90+5'	Report	Raphael Guzzo (yellow card) 7'; Anderson (yellow card) 13'; Carlos Isaac (yellow card) 71'; Osmajić (yellow card) 88'	Stadium: Estádio Municipal de Braga; Attendance: 14,181; Referee: (Portugal) André Narciso

1 October 2022 8	Vizela	1–0	Portimonense	Vizela
15:30 WEST (UTC+1)	Nuno Moreira (yellow card) 2'; Anderson 14'; Kiki (yellow card) 45'; Ivanildo Fernandes (yellow card) 47'	Report	Pedrão (yellow card) 16'; Sapara (yellow card) 86'; Róchez (yellow card) 90+3'	Stadium: Estádio do Futebol Clube de Vizela; Attendance: 2,435; Referee: (Portugal) António Nobre

9 October 2022 9	Casa Pia	0–1	Vizela	Oeiras, Portugal
18:00 WEST (UTC+1)	Afonso Taira (yellow card) 17'; Kunimoto (yellow card) 39'; João Nunes (yellow card) 79'	Report	Raphael Guzzo (yellow card) 23' (goal) 67'	Stadium: Estádio Nacional; Attendance: 2,912; Referee: (Portugal) João Pinheiro

23 October 2022 10	Vizela	0–1	Santa Clara	Vizela
15:30 WEST (UTC+1)	Ivanildo Fernandes (red card) 2'; Kiki (yellow card) 34'; Schmidt (yellow card) 76'	Report	Adriano (yellow card) 20'; Ricardo Fernandes (yellow card) 73'; González (yellow card) 81'; Bruno Almeida 87'; Gabriel Silva (yellow card) 90+2'; Stevanović (yellow card) 90+2'; Andrezinho (yellow card) 90+4'	Stadium: Estádio do Futebol Clube de Vizela; Attendance: 2,007; Referee: (Portugal) Gustavo Correia
