= 2023–24 Maccabi Tel Aviv F.C. season =

Maccabi Tel Aviv
2023–24 season
- Chairman: Mitchell Goldhar
- Manager: Robbie Keane
- Stadium: Bloomfield Stadium, Tel Aviv
- Premier League: 1st
- State Cup: Quarter-finals
- Toto Cup: Winners
- Europa Conference League: Round of 16
- Top goalscorer: League: Eran Zahavi (20); All: Eran Zahavi (39)
Home colours	Away colours	Third colours

The 2023–24 season is Maccabi Tel Aviv's 117th season since its establishment in 1906 and 76th since the establishment of the State of Israel. During the 2023–24 campaign, the club will compete in the Israeli Premier League, State Cup, Toto Cup and Europa Conference League.

Maccabi separated from their former manager Aitor Karanka on 25 June, and two days later announced Robbie Keane as their new manager.

Sheran Yeini is still the team captain, however, second captain Eran Zahavi frequently starts in his place.

By the end of August, Maccabi guaranteed its participation in the UEFA Europa Conference League group stage. This will be the ninth time Maccabi Tel Aviv has participated in the European group stage and the third time in the last four years.

Notable signings for this year include French defender Yvann Maçon and the international Angolan winger Felício Milson, while goalkeeper Daniel Peretz was transferred to Bayern Munich and striker Đorđe Jovanović was bought by FC Basel.

As a result of October 7 attacks, the Israeli league was postponed since the sixth round, the Maccabi game in the third round of the Conference League was postponed to November, and the club will host its European games outside of Israel.

On 14 December Maccabi secured first place in the group stage of the Conference League and thus guaranteed an appearance in the round of 16, the most advanced stage of a European competition in the team's history.

On 24 January Maccabi won the Toto Cup after a penalty shootout over Maccabi Haifa.

On 25 May Maccabi won the Israeli Premier League, making it Maccabi's 25th Israeli title.

== Transfers ==
=== In ===
Date	Pos.	No.	Player	Transferred from	Fee	Ref
30 May 2023	GK	90	(Israel) Roi Mishpati	(Israel) Maccabi Haifa	Free Transfer	
2 July 2023	DF	97	(France) Yvann Maçon	(France) AS Saint-Étienne	Loan	
8 July 2023	MF	17	(Angola) Felício Milson	(Russia) FC Pari Nizhny Novgorod	€700,000	
30 August 2023	MF	77	(Israel) Osher Davida	(Belgium) Standard Liège	€800,000	
2 September 2023	MF	70	(Portugal) Kiko Bondoso	(Portugal) F.C. Vizela	€800,000	
4 September 2023	DF	2	(Israel) Avishay Cohen	(Israel) Beitar Jerusalem	Free Transfer	
4 September 2023	GK	22	(Panama) Orlando Mosquera	(Venezuela) Monagas S.C.	Free Transfer	
Winter
5 January 2024	DF	30	(Israel) Matan Baltaxa	Austria Wien	Free Transfer	
18 January 2024	MF	72	(Israel) Eden Kartsev	(Turkey) Başakşehir	Loan	
31 January 2024	FW	15	(Israel) Yonas Malede	(Belgium) Mechelen	€350,000	
2 February 2024	FW	—	(Israel) Elad Madmon	(Israel) Hapoel Hadera	€1,700,000	
2 February 2024	DF	13	(Israel) Raz Shlomo	(Belgium) Leuven	€1,150,000	
6 February 2024	FW	20	(Ghana) Henry Addo	(Slovakia) MŠK Žilina	€500,000	

=== Out ===
Date	Pos.	No.	Player	To club	Fee	Ref
21 May 2023	DF	—	(Israel) Maor Kandil	(Israel) Maccabi Haifa	Free Transfer	
21 May 2023	MF	—	(Israel) Avi Rikan	(Israel) Hapoel Petah Tikva	Free Transfer	
21 May 2023	DF	—	(Portugal) André Geraldes	(Portugal) Casa Pia	Free Transfer	
5 July 2023	MF	—	(Romania) Rareș Ilie	(France) Nice	Loan Return	
6 July 2023	MF	—	(Israel) Orel Baye	(Israel) Hapoel Hadera	Loan	
6 July 2023	MF	—	(Israel) Roy Nawi	(Israel) Hapoel Petah Tikva	Loan	
19 July 2023	FW	77	(Israel) Matan Hozez	(Israel) Hapoel Jerusalem	Loan	
25 July 2023	MF	—	(Israel) Bar Cohen	(Israel) Maccabi Netanya	€195,000	
17 August 2023	FW	99	(Serbia) Đorđe Jovanović	(Switzerland) FC Basel	€2,700,000	
24 August 2023	GK	1	(Israel) Daniel Peretz	(Germany) Bayern Munich	€5,000,000	
29 August 2023	DF	31	(Israel) Shahar Piven	(Israel) Hapoel Jerusalem	Free Transfer	
29 August 2023	MF	18	(Ivory Coast) Parfait Guiagon	(Belgium) Charleroi	€1,600,000	
4 September 2023	MF	6	(Israel) Dan Glazer	(Greece) OFI Crete	Free Transfer	
20 September 2023	DF	24	(Israel) Guy Mizrahi	(Israel) Maccabi Netanya	€200,000	
20 September 2023	FW	29	(Israel) Eylon Almog	(Israel) Hapoel Be'er Sheva	€600,000	
Winter
5 January 2024	DF	97	(France) Yvann Maçon	(France) AS Saint-Étienne	Loan Return	
2 February 2024	FW	—	(Israel) Elad Madmon	(Israel) Hapoel Hadera	Loan	
6 February 2024	FW	34	(Israel) Saied Abu Farchi	(Israel) Kafr Qasim	Loan	

== Season squad ==
As of 5 January 2024

No.	Pos.	Nation	Player
2	DF	ISR	Avishay Cohen
3	DF	ISR	Roy Revivo
4	DF	ESP	Enric Saborit
5	DF	ISR	Idan Nachmias
7	FW	ISR	Eran Zahavi (Vice-captain)
9	FW	ISR	Dor Turgeman
10	MF	ISR	Dan Biton
11	FW	ISR	Yonatan Cohen
13	DF	ISR	Raz Shlomo
14	MF	NED	Joris van Overeem
15	FW	ISR	Yonas Malede
16	MF	ISR	Gabi Kanichowsky
17	MF	ANG	Felício Milson
19	GK	ISR	Daniel Tenenbaum
20	FW	GHA	Henry Addo

No.	Pos.	Nation	Player
21	DF	ISR	Sheran Yeini (Captain)
22	GK	PAN	Orlando Mosquera
23	MF	ISR	Eyal Golasa
25	DF	NED	Derrick Luckassen
26	MF	ISR	Ido Shahar
27	DF	ISR	Ofir Davidzada
30	DF	ISR	Matan Baltaxa
33	GK	ISR	Or Itzhak
38	FW	ISR	Ori Azo
42	MF	ISR	Dor Peretz (3rd captain)
66	DF	ISR	Nir Bitton
70	MF	POR	Kiko Bondoso
72	MF	ISR	Eden Kartsev (on loan from Başakşehir)
77	MF	ISR	Osher Davida
90	GK	ISR	Roi Mishpati

=== Internationals ===
Only up to six non-Israeli nationals can be in an Israeli club squad (only five can play at the same time). Those with Jewish ancestry, married to an Israeli or have played in Israel for an extended period of time, can claim a passport or permanent residency which would allow them to play with Israeli status.

- (Angola) Felício Milson
- (Netherlands) Derrick Luckassen
- (Panama) Orlando Mosquera
- (Portugal) Kiko Bondoso
- (Spain) Enric Saborit
- (Ghana) Henry Addo

== Pre-season and friendlies ==
Win Draw Loss Fixtures

13 July 2023 Friendly	Orlando Pirates F.C. (South Africa)	1–0	(Israel) Maccabi Tel Aviv	Marbella, Spain

16 July 2023 Friendly	AFC Bournemouth (England)	0–1	(Israel) Maccabi Tel Aviv	Marbella, Spain

== Competitions ==
=== Overall record ===
Competition	First match	Last match	Starting round	Final position	Record							
Competition	First match	Last match	Starting round	Final position	Pld	W	D	L	GF	GA	GD	Win %
Premier League	20 August 2023	20 May 2024	Matchday 1	Winner	36	26	7	3	75	25	+50	72.22
State Cup	28 January 2024	2 April 2024	8th round	Quarterfinals	3	2	0	1	7	5	+2	66.67
Toto Cup	20 July 2023	24 January 2024	UEFA qualifiers match	Winner	3	3	0	0	11	2	+9	100.00
UEFA Conference League	27 July 2023	14 March 2024	2nd qualifying round	Round of 16	14	10	2	2	31	19	+12	71.43
Total					56	41	9	6	124	51	+73	73.21

Source: Maccabi Tel Aviv Website

== Israeli Premier League ==
=== Regular season table ===
Pos	Team	Pld	W	D	L	GF	GA	GD	Pts	Qualification
1	Maccabi Tel Aviv	26	19	5	2	55	20	+35	62 (Note: Maccabi Tel Aviv had 1 point deducted. but after appeal the 1 point was returned)	Qualification for the Championship round
2	Maccabi Haifa	26	17	6	3	55	18	+37	55 (Note: Maccabi Haifa had 2 points deducted.)	Qualification for the Championship round
3	Hapoel Be'er Sheva	26	15	4	7	45	19	+26	49	Qualification for the Championship round
4	Hapoel Haifa	26	14	5	7	38	32	+6	47	Qualification for the Championship round
5	Maccabi Bnei Reineh	26	8	10	8	27	26	+1	34	Qualification for the Championship round

Source: Soccerway
Rules for classification: 1) Points; 2) Goal difference; 3) Matches won; 4) Goals scored; 5) Head-to-head points; 6) Head-to-head goal difference; 7) Head-to-head goals scored; 8) Play-off.

==== Regular season Matches ====
Win Draw Loss Fixtures

27 August 2023 1	Maccabi Tel Aviv	4–1	F.C. Ashdod	Tel Aviv
20:15	Zahavi 52'; Revivo 59'; Awany 70' (o.g.); Milson 84'	Report	Kamaheni (red card) 86'; Adir Levi 90+4'	Stadium: Bloomfield Stadium; Attendance: 22,108; Referee: Gal Laibuvitz

3 September 2023 2	Hapoel Hadera	0–3	Maccabi Tel Aviv	Netanya
20:30		Report	Dan Biton 12'; Kanichowsky 61'; Zahavi 74'	Stadium: Netanya Stadium; Attendance: 6,815; Referee: Ohad Asulin

17 September 2023 3	Maccabi Tel Aviv	1–1	Maccabi Bnei Reineh	Tel Aviv
19:45	Milson 45+7'	Report	Azulay 57'	Stadium: Bloomfield Stadium; Attendance: 20,029; Referee: Snir Levi

26 September 2023 4	Hapoel Tel Aviv	0–5	Maccabi Tel Aviv	Tel Aviv
20:30		Report	Peretz 22', 34'; Biton 40'; Zahavi 48'; Turgeman 89'	Stadium: Bloomfield Stadium; Attendance: 17,100; Referee: Gal Laibuvitz

30 September 2023 5	Maccabi Tel Aviv	2–0	Hapoel Petah Tikva	Tel Aviv
17:45	Zahavi 54' (pen.); Turgeman 81'	Report		Stadium: Bloomfield Stadium; Attendance: 23,848; Referee: David Fuxman

3 December 2023 6	Hapoel Jerusalem	1–2	Maccabi Tel Aviv	Jerusalem
20:00	Ofek Bitton 40'	Report	Zahavi 54'; Davida 74'	Stadium: Teddy Stadium; Attendance: 0 (Note: Played Behind closed doors due to the Gaza war); Referee: Idan Leiba

10 December 2023 8	Bnei Sakhnin	2–3	Maccabi Tel Aviv	Sakhnin
20:00	Elmkies 76'; Shaker 82'	Report	Kanichowsky 2'; Abu Nil 60' (o.g.); Zahavi 71'	Stadium: Doha Stadium; Attendance: 0 Referee: Orel Grinfeld

17 December 2023 9	Maccabi Tel Aviv	2–1	Maccabi Netanya	Tel Aviv
20:00	Milson 19'; Zahavi 56' (pen.)	Report	Shviro 22'	Stadium: Bloomfield Stadium; Attendance: 0 Referee: Snir Levi

20 December 2023 10	Hapoel Be'er Sheva	0–1	Maccabi Tel Aviv	Be'er Sheva
20:30	Poko (red card) 70'	Report	Zahavi 37'	Stadium: Turner Stadium; Attendance: 4,230 (Note: due to the Gaza war the Home Front Command and the Israel Football Association was limited the number of attendance to 5,000); Referee: Roee Reinshreiber

24 December 2023 11	Maccabi Petah Tikva	1–2	Maccabi Tel Aviv	Petah Tikva
20:00	Guindo 30'	Report	Deznet 46' (o.g.); Zahavi 75'	Stadium: HaMoshava Stadium; Attendance: 4,339; Referee: Aviad Shiloach

27 December 2023 12	Maccabi Tel Aviv	1–0	Beitar Jerusalem	Tel Aviv
20:30	Yonatan Cohen 90+2'	Report		Stadium: Bloomfield Stadium; Attendance: 4,500; Referee: Gal Laibuvitz

31 December 2023 13	Hapoel Haifa	0–1	Maccabi Tel Aviv	Haifa
20:00		Report	Nachmias 45+1'	Stadium: Sammy Ofer Stadium; Attendance: 5,817 (Note: due to the Gaza war the Home Front Command and the Israel Football Association was limited the number of attendance to 15,000); Referee: Erez Papir

3 January 2024 14	F.C. Ashdod	1–4	Maccabi Tel Aviv	Ashdod
20:00	Mamatah 58'	Report	Dan Biton 45+2'; Kiko 47'; Turgeman 84'; Kanichowsky 90'	Stadium: Yud-Alef Stadium; Attendance: 100; Referee: Snir Levi

7 January 2024 15	Maccabi Tel Aviv	1–1	Hapoel Hadera	Tel Aviv
20:00	Turgeman 67'	Report	Madmon 16'	Stadium: Bloomfield Stadium; Attendance: 14,345; Referee: Ohad Asulin

10 January 2024 7	Maccabi Tel Aviv	0–1	Maccabi Haifa	Tel Aviv
20:30		Report	Refaelov 12'	Stadium: Bloomfield Stadium; Attendance: 14,223; Referee: Orel Grinfeld

14 January 2024 16	Maccabi Bnei Reineh	2–2	Maccabi Tel Aviv	Nof HaGalil
20:30	Jaber 20'; Halaf 53'	Report	Dor Peretz 43', 85'	Stadium: Green Stadium; Attendance: 2,493; Referee: Gal Laibuvitz

17 January 2024 17	Maccabi Tel Aviv	4–2	Hapoel Tel Aviv	Tel Aviv
20:30	Turgeman 2', 25'; Zahavi 42', 64' (pen.)	Report	Rohana 32'; Archel 38'	Stadium: Bloomfield Stadium; Attendance: 14,905; Referee: Idan Leiba

21 January 2024 18	Hapoel Petah Tikva	0–0	Maccabi Tel Aviv	Petah Tikva
20:00		Report		Stadium: HaMoshava Stadium; Attendance: 9,051; Referee: Nael Odeh

31 January 2024 19	Maccabi Tel Aviv	2–1	Hapoel Jerusalem	Tel Aviv
20:00	Turgeman 30'; Kanichowsky 51'	Report	Duin 13'	Stadium: Bloomfield Stadium; Attendance: 10,918; Referee: David Fuxman

5 February 2024 20	Maccabi Haifa	2–0	Maccabi Tel Aviv	Haifa
20:30	Šimić 3'; David 22'	Report		Stadium: Sammy Ofer Stadium; Attendance: 14,555; Referee: Orel Grinfeld

10 February 2024 21	Maccabi Tel Aviv	1–1	Bnei Sakhnin	Tel Aviv
15:00	Malede 88'	Report	Shaker 19'	Stadium: Bloomfield Stadium; Attendance: 20,822; Referee: Gal Laibuvitz

19 February 2024 22	Maccabi Netanya	1–5	Maccabi Tel Aviv	Netanya
20:00	Shviro 45+1'	Report	Shahar 16' (pen.), 90+4'; Revivo 39'; Kanichowsky 63'; Milson 73'	Stadium: Netanya Stadium; Attendance: 10,763; Referee: Aviad Shiloach

24 February 2024 23	Maccabi Tel Aviv	1–0	Hapoel Be'er Sheva	Tel Aviv
20:00	Milson 41'	Report		Stadium: Bloomfield Stadium; Attendance: 25,051; Referee: Roee Reinshreiber

2 March 2024 24	Maccabi Tel Aviv	4–0	Maccabi Petah Tikva	Tel Aviv
20:00	Zahavi 9'; Peretz 27'; Milson 77'; Kanichowsky 84'	Report		Stadium: Bloomfield Stadium; Attendance: 21,516; Referee: Snir Levi

10 March 2024 25	Beitar Jerusalem	0–1	Maccabi Tel Aviv	Jerusalem
20:00		Report	Dan Biton 45' (pen.)	Stadium: Teddy Stadium; Attendance: 17,713; Referee: Orel Grinfeld

17 March 2024 26	Maccabi Tel Aviv	3–1	Hapoel Haifa	Tel Aviv
20:00	Zahavi 28' (pen.), 45+3'; Peretz 85'	Report	Yosefi 13' (pen.)	Stadium: Bloomfield Stadium; Attendance: 21,486; Referee: Gal Laibuvitz

=== Championship round table ===
Pos	Team	Pld	W	D	L	GF	GA	GD	Pts	Qualification	MTA	MHA	HBS	HHA	MBR	BnS
1	Maccabi Tel Aviv (C)	36	26	7	3	75	25	+50	85	Qualification for the Champions League second qualifying round	—	1–1	3–0	4–0	2–0	2–0
2	Maccabi Haifa	36	23	7	6	75	28	+47	74 (Note: Maccabi Haifa had 2 points deducted.)	Qualification for the Conference League second qualifying round	0–1	—	4–1	0–2	1–2	1–0
3	Hapoel Be'er Sheva	36	19	4	13	55	40	+15	61	Qualification for the Conference League second qualifying round	1–0	1–4	—	2–1	2–1	2–1
4	Hapoel Haifa	36	18	5	13	48	47	+1	59		0–3	0–2	2–0	—	2–0	1–2
5	Maccabi Bnei Reineh	36	11	11	14	38	44	−6	44		2–3	1–5	1–0	0–1	—	2–2
6	Bnei Sakhnin	36	10	15	11	39	46	−7	44 (Note: Bnei Sakhnin had 1 point deducted.)		1–1	1–2	4–1	2–1	0–2	—

Source: Soccerway
Legend: Blue = home team win; Yellow = draw; Red = away team win.
Rules for classification: 1) Points; 2) Goal difference; 3) Matches won; 4) Goals scored; 5) Head-to-head points; 6) Head-to-head goal difference; 7) Head-to-head goals scored; 8) Play-off.
(C) Champions

==== Championship round Matches ====
30 March 2024 27	Maccabi Tel Aviv	2–0	Bnei Sakhnin	Tel Aviv
20:00	Peretz 89'; Zahavi 90+9' (pen.)	Report		Stadium: Bloomfield Stadium; Attendance: 20,267; Referee: Aviad Shiloach

8 April 2024 28	Maccabi Tel Aviv	1–1	Maccabi Haifa	Tel Aviv
20:30	Zahavi 14'	Report	Khalaili 70'	Stadium: Bloomfield Stadium; Attendance: 26,275; Referee: Snir Levi

15 April 2024 29	Hapoel Be'er Sheva	1–0	Maccabi Tel Aviv	Be'er Sheva
20:30	Sefer 80'	Report		Stadium: Turner Stadium; Attendance: 12,105; Referee: Igal Frid

20 April 2024 30	Maccabi Tel Aviv	4–0	Hapoel Haifa	Tel Aviv
17:00	Milson 4'; Turgeman 9'; Kanichowsky 50'; Peretz 53'	Report		Stadium: Bloomfield Stadium; Attendance: 23,221; Referee: Erez Papir

27 April 2024 31	Maccabi Bnei Reineh	2–3	Maccabi Tel Aviv	Nof HaGalil
17:00	Usman 25'; Ganem 54'	Report	Davida 13'; Kanichowsky 21'; Peretz 45+1'	Stadium: Green Stadium; Attendance: 4,459; Referee: Idan Layba

6 May 2024 32	Bnei Sakhnin	1–1	Maccabi Tel Aviv	Sakhnin
20:30	Hilo 67'	Report	Davida 53'; Milson (red card) 61'	Stadium: Doha Stadium; Attendance: 3,510; Referee: Orel Grinfeeld

11 May 2024 33	Maccabi Haifa	0–1	Maccabi Tel Aviv	Haifa
20:30		Report	Zahavi 27' (pen.)	Stadium: Sammy Ofer Stadium; Attendance: 29,842; Referee: Roee Reinshreiber

18 May 2024 34	Maccabi Tel Aviv	3–0	Hapoel Be'er Sheva	Tel Aviv
20:30	Turgeman 25'; Davidzada 33'; Shahar 69'	Report	Vítor (red card) 1'	Stadium: Bloomfield Stadium; Attendance: 25,180; Referee: Gal Laibuvitz

21 May 2024 35	Hapoel Haifa	0–3	Maccabi Tel Aviv	Haifa
20:30		Report	Zahavi 63', 71'; Peretz 64'	Stadium: Sammy Ofer Stadium; Attendance: 6,834; Referee: Gal Levi

25 May 2024 36	Maccabi Tel Aviv	2–0	Maccabi Bnei Reineh	Tel Aviv
20:30	Kanichowsky 40'; Zahavi 45+4' (pen.)	Report		Stadium: Bloomfield Stadium; Attendance: 21,145; Referee: Sapir Berman

=== Results overview ===
Win Draw Loss

Opposition	Regular season		Championship round	
Opposition	Home	Away	Home	Away
F.C. Ashdod	4–1	4–1		
Beitar Jerusalem	1–0	1–0		
Bnei Sakhnin	1–1	3–2	2–0	1–1
Hapoel Be'er Sheva	1–0	1–0	3–0	0–1
Hapoel Hadera	1–1	3–0		
Hapoel Haifa	3–1	1–0	4–0	3–0
Hapoel Jerusalem	2–1	2–1		
Hapoel Petah Tikva	2–0	0–0		
Hapoel Tel Aviv	4–2	5–0		
Maccabi Bnei Reineh	1–1	2–2	2–0	3–2
Maccabi Haifa	0–1	0–2	1–1	1–0
Maccabi Netanya	2–1	5–1		
Maccabi Petah Tikva	4–0	2–1		

== Israel State Cup ==
Win Draw Loss Fixtures

28 January 2024 8th round	Hapoel Hadera	0–2	Maccabi Tel Aviv	Netanya
19:30		Report	Dan Biton 59'; Davida 88'	Stadium: Netanya Stadium; Attendance: 3,403 (Note: due to the Gaza war the Home Front Command and the Israel Football Association was limited the number of attendance to 15,000); Referee: Snir Levi

28 February 2024 Round of 16	Maccabi Tel Aviv	3–1	Maccabi Jaffa	Tel Aviv
20:30	Turgeman 43'; Zahavi 80', 85'	Report	Itzhak 25' (pen.)	Stadium: Bloomfield Stadium; Attendance: 12,326; Referee: Sapir Berman

2 April 2024 Quarterfinals	Maccabi Petah Tikva	4–2 (a.e.t.)	Maccabi Tel Aviv	Petah Tikva
20:30	Levi 11' (pen.); Karo 90+8'; Yehoshua 103'; Hazan 120+2'	Report	Nachmias 20'; Zahavi 90+6' (pen.)	Stadium: HaMoshava Stadium; Attendance: 8,450; Referee: Orel Grinfeld

== Toto Cup Al ==
Win Draw Loss Fixtures

20 July 2023 UEFA qualifiers	Hapoel Be'er Sheva	1–6	Maccabi Tel Aviv	Be'er Sheva
20:00	Abu Abaid (red card) 50'; Safouri 56'	Report	Yonatan Cohen 38'; Zahavi 45+4', 47', 52' (pen.); Dor Peretz 60'; Dan Biton 79'	Stadium: Turner Stadium; Attendance: 13,347; Referee: David Fuxman

20 August 2023 Semi-final	Bnei Sakhnin	1–5	Maccabi Tel Aviv	Sakhnin
20:00	Taji 54'	Report	Dor Peretz 16'; Yonatan Cohen 57', 67'; Turgeman 58'; Dan Biton 82'	Stadium: Doha Stadium; Attendance: 2,700; Referee: Aviad Shiloach

24 January 2024 Final	Maccabi Tel Aviv	0–0 (4–2 p)	Maccabi Haifa	Netanya
20:30		Report		Stadium: Netanya Stadium; Attendance: 12,167; Referee: Aviad Shiloach
	Penalties
	Zahavi (penalty scored); Kartsev (penalty scored); Davida (penalty scored); Peretz (penalty missed); Luckassen (penalty scored)		(penalty missed) Chery; (penalty missed) Pierrot; (penalty scored) Khalaili; (penalty scored) Cornud

== UEFA Europa Conference League ==
Win Draw Loss Fixtures

=== Second qualifying round ===
27 July 2023 1st leg	Maccabi Tel Aviv (Israel)	3–0	(Moldova) Petrocub Hîncești	Tel Aviv, Israel
20:30	Dan Biton 13'; Zahavi 63'; Dor Peretz 90+4'	Report		Stadium: Bloomfield Stadium; Attendance: 20,091

3 August 2023 2nd leg	Petrocub Hîncești (Moldova)	0–2 (0–5 agg.)	(Israel) Maccabi Tel Aviv	Chișinău, Moldova
20:00		Report	Guiagon 90+1'; Dor Peretz 90+3'	Stadium: Zimbru Stadium; Attendance: 5,348

Maccabi Tel Aviv won 5–0 on aggregate.

=== Third qualifying round ===
9 August 2023 1st leg	AEK Larnaca (Cyprus)	1–1	(Israel) Maccabi Tel Aviv	Larnaca, Cyprus
20:00	Faraj 80'	Report	Cohen 64'	Stadium: AEK Arena – Georgios Karapatakis; Attendance: 4,745; Referee: Jonathan Lardot (Belgium)

17 August 2023 2nd leg	Maccabi Tel Aviv (Israel)	1–0 (2–1 agg.)	(Cyprus) AEK Larnaca	Tel Aviv, Israel
20:00	Zahavi 86' (pen.)	Report		Stadium: Bloomfield Stadium; Attendance: 26,152; Referee: Fran Jović (Croatia)

Maccabi Tel Aviv won 2–1 on aggregate.

=== Play-off round ===
24 August 2023 1st leg	Maccabi Tel Aviv (Israel)	4–1	(Slovenia) Celje	Tel Aviv, Israel
20:00	Zahavi 22' (pen.), 51', 73'; Turgeman 90+2'	Report	Bajde 29'; Nemanic (red card) 90+2'	Stadium: Bloomfield Stadium; Attendance: 22,030; Referee: Manfredas Lukjančukas (Lithuania)

31 August 2023 2nd leg	Celje (Slovenia)	1–1	(Israel) Maccabi Tel Aviv	Celje, Slovenia
21:00	Matko 12'	Report	Kanichowsky 50'	Stadium: Stadion Z'dežele; Attendance: 2,612; Referee: Jérémie Pignard (France)

Maccabi Tel Aviv won 5–2 on aggregate.

=== Group stage ===
Pos	Team	Pld	W	D	L	GF	GA	GD	Pts	Qualification	MTA	GNT	ZOR	BRE
1	(Israel) Maccabi Tel Aviv	6	5	0	1	14	9	+5	15	Advance to round of 16	—	3–1	3–2	3–2
2	(Belgium) Gent	6	4	1	1	16	7	+9	13	Advance to knockout round play-offs	2–0	—	4–1	5–0
3	(Ukraine) Zorya Luhansk	6	2	1	3	10	11	−1	7		1–3	1–1	—	4–0
4	(Iceland) Breiðablik	6	0	0	6	5	18	−13	0		1–2	2–3	0–1	—

Source: UEFA
Legend: Blue = home team win; Yellow = draw; Red = away team win.
Rules for classification: Group stage tiebreakers

21 September 2023 Game 1	Maccabi Tel Aviv (Israel)	3–2	(Iceland) Breiðablik	Tel Aviv, Israel
21:00	Maçon 11'; Zahavi 24'; Biton 32'	Report	Olsen 44', 55'	Stadium: Bloomfield Stadium; Attendance: 18,558; Referee: Vitālijs Spasjoņņikovs

5 October 2023 Game 2	Gent (Belgium)	2–0	(Israel) Maccabi Tel Aviv	Ghent, Belgium
18:45	Tissoudali 39', 90+2' (pen.)	Report		Stadium: Ghelamco Arena; Attendance: 10,503; Referee: Abdulkadir Bitigen

9 November 2023 Game 4	Zorya Luhansk (Ukraine)	1–3	(Israel) Maccabi Tel Aviv	Lublin, Poland
21:00	Alefirenko 74'	Report	Luckassen 7'; Dor Peretz 26', 43'	Stadium: Arena Lublin; Attendance: 763; Referee: John Beaton (Scotland)

25 November 2023 Game 3	Maccabi Tel Aviv (Israel)	3–2	(Ukraine) Zorya Luhansk	Bačka Topola, Serbia (Note: Due to the Gaza war, Maccabi Tel Aviv play their remaining home matches at a neutral venue.)
18:45	Zahavi 45+2'; Dor Peretz 46', 60'	Report	Guerrero 71'; Horbach 88'	Stadium: TSC Arena; Referee: Lukas Fähndrich (Switzerland)

30 November 2023 Game 5	Breiðablik (Iceland)	1–2	(Israel) Maccabi Tel Aviv	Reykjavík, Iceland
15:00 (13:00 WET)	Eyjolfsson 61' (red card) 90+5'	Report	Dan Biton 37'; Zahavi 82'	Stadium: Laugardalsvöllur; Referee: Luka Bilbija (Bosnia-Herzegovina)

14 December 2023 Game 6	Maccabi Tel Aviv (Israel)	3–1	(Belgium) Gent	Bačka Topola, Serbia
21:00	Kanichowsky 9'; Zahavi 24', 61'	Report	De Sart 49'	Stadium: TSC Arena; Referee: Jesús Gil Manzano (Spain)

=== Round of 16 ===
7 March 2024 Round of 16 — 1st leg	Olympiacos (Greece)	1–4	(Israel) Maccabi Tel Aviv	Piraeus, Greece
20:45	El Kaabi 13'	Report	Zahavi 4', 30'; Shahar 9'; Peretz 74'	Stadium: Karaiskakis Stadium; Attendance: 31,054; Referee: Craig Pawson (England)

14 March 2024 Round of 16 — 2nd leg	Maccabi Tel Aviv (Israel)	1–6 (a.e.t.) (5–7 agg.)	(Greece) Olympiacos	Bačka Topola, Serbia
21:00	Zahavi 57' (pen.)	Report	Podence 10'; Fortounis 36'; El Kaabi 45+3', 65'; Jovetić 93'; El-Arabi 103'	Stadium: TSC Arena; Attendance: 370; Referee: Maurizio Mariani (Italy)

== Squad statistics ==
=== Goals ===
Rank	Pos.	No.	Player	Premier League	State Cup	Toto Cup	Europe	Total
1	FW	7	(Israel) Eran Zahavi	20	3	3	13	39
2	MF	42	(Israel) Dor Peretz	10	0	2	7	19
3	FW	9	(Israel) Dor Turgeman	9	1	1	1	12
3	MF	16	(Israel) Gabi Kanichowsky	9	0	0	3	12
5	MF	10	(Israel) Dan Biton	4	1	2	3	10
6	MF	17	(Angola) Felício Milson	7	0	0	0	7
7	MF	11	(Israel) Yonatan Cohen	1	0	3	1	5
8	MF	77	(Israel) Osher Davida	3	1	0	0	4
9	MF	26	(Israel) Ido Shahar	3	0	0	0	3
10	DF	3	(Israel) Roy Revivo	2	0	0	0	2
10	DF	5	(Israel) Idan Nachmias	1	1	0	0	2
12	MF	70	(Portugal) Kiko Bondoso	1	0	0	0	1
12	FW	15	(Israel) Yonas Malede	1	0	0	0	1
12	DF	27	(Israel) Ofir Davidzada	1	0	0	0	1
12	MF	18	(Ivory Coast) Parfait Guiagon	0	0	0	1	1
12	DF	25	(Netherlands) Derrick Luckassen	0	0	0	1	1
12	DF	97	(France) Yvann Maçon	0	0	0	1	1
Own goals				3	0	0	0	3
Total				75	7	11	31	124

=== Assists ===
Rank	Pos.	No.	Player	Premier League	State Cup	Toto Cup	Europe	Total
1	MF	16	(Israel) Gabi Kanichowsky	7	0	1	5	13
1	MF	17	(Angola) Felício Milson	7	1	1	4	13
3	FW	7	(Israel) Eran Zahavi	7	0	0	1	8
3	MF	77	(Israel) Osher Davida	6	1	0	0	8
3	MF	10	(Israel) Dan Biton	6	0	0	2	8
6	DF	4	(Spain) Enric Saborit	3	0	0	1	4
6	MF	11	(Israel) Yonatan Cohen	1	0	1	2	4
8	DF	26	(Israel) Ido Shahar	2	1	0	0	3
8	DF	3	(Israel) Roy Revivo	2	1	0	0	3
8	DF	14	(Netherlands) Joris van Overeem	1	0	0	2	3
8	DF	97	(France) Yvann Maçon	0	0	1	2	3
8	DF	29	(Israel) Eylon Almog	0	0	2	1	3
13	DF	27	(Israel) Ofir Davidzada	2	0	0	0	2
13	MF	42	(Israel) Dor Peretz	2	0	0	0	2
13	MF	23	(Israel) Eyal Golasa	0	1	0	1	2
16	MF	70	(Portugal) Kiko Bondoso	1	0	0	0	1
16	DF	5	(Israel) Idan Nachmias	1	0	0	0	1
16	FW	9	(Israel) Dor Turgeman	0	0	0	1	1
16	DF	30	(Israel) Matan Baltaxa	0	1	0	0	1
16	FW	99	(Serbia) Đorđe Jovanović	0	0	0	1	1
Total				48	6	6	23	83

=== Clean sheets ===
Rank	Pos.	No.	Player	Premier League	State Cup	Toto Cup	Europe	Total
1	MF	90	(Israel) Roi Mashpati	13	1	1	0	15
2	MF	22	(Panama) Orlando Mosquera	3	0	0	0	3
2	MF	1	(Israel) Daniel Peretz	0	0	0	3	3
Total				16	1	1	3	21
