= 2017–18 CF Reus Deportiu season =

CF Reus Deportiu
2017–18 season
- Chairman: Xavier Llastarri
- Manager: Aritz López Garai
- Stadium: Estadi Municipal
- Segunda División: -
Home colours

The 2017–18 season is the 109th season in CF Reus Deportiu ’s history.

== Squad ==
As of 21 August 2017

Note: Flags indicate national team as defined under FIFA eligibility rules; some limited exceptions apply. Players may hold more than one non-FIFA nationality.

No.	Pos.	Nation	Player
1	GK	ESP	Roberto Santamaría
3	DF	ESP	Álex Menéndez
4	DF	ESP	Jesús Olmo
5	DF	ESP	Pablo Íñiguez
6	MF	POR	Vítor Silva
7	FW	ESP	David Querol
9	FW	ESP	Edgar Hernández
10	MF	POR	Ricardo Vaz
11	MF	ESP	Fran Carbià
12	DF	ESP	Joan Campins
13	GK	ESP	Édgar Badía

No.	Pos.	Nation	Player
14	DF	ESP	Migue García
16	MF	ESP	Juan Cámara (on loan from Barcelona)
17	MF	ESP	David Haro
18	DF	ESP	Pichu Atienza
19	MF	ESP	Álex Carbonell
20	MF	POR	Luís Gustavo
21	FW	ESP	Máyor
22	MF	ESP	Borja Fernández (on loan from Celta)
23	MF	ESP	Tito
24	MF	ESP	Jorge Miramón
25	MF	POR	Raphael Guzzo

=== Transfers ===
- List of Spanish football transfers summer 2017#Reus

==== In ====
Date	Player	From	Type	Fee	Ref
7 July 2017	(Spain) Roberto Santamaría	(Spain) Mallorca	Transfer	Free	
10 July 2017	(Portugal) Gus Ledes	(Spain) Celta B	Transfer	Free	
12 July 2017	(Spain) Pablo Íñiguez	(Spain) Villarreal	Transfer	Free	
13 July 2017	(Spain) Álex Menéndez	TBD		Free	
15 July 2017	(Spain) Tito	(Spain) UCAM Murcia	Transfer	Free	
20 July 2017	(Spain) Borja Fernández	(Spain) Celta B	Loan	Free	
27 July 2017	(Spain) Àlex Carbonell	(Spain) Barcelona B	Transfer	Free	

==== Out ====
Date	Player	To	Type	Fee	Ref
13 June 2017	(Spain) Alberto Benito	(Spain) Zaragoza	Transfer	Free	
13 June 2017	(Spain) Ángel Martínez	(Spain) Zaragoza	Transfer	Free	
30 June 2017	(Spain) Ramón Folch	(Spain) Oviedo	Transfer	Free	
30 June 2017	(Serbia) Srđan Babić	(Spain) Real Sociedad	Loan return	Free	
30 June 2017	(Uruguay) Jorge Díaz	(Spain) Zaragoza	Loan return	Free	
1 July 2017	(Spain) Aritz López Garai	Retired			
1 July 2017	(Spain) Melli	TBD		Free	
1 July 2017	(Nigeria) Macky Chrisantus	TBD		Free	
1 July 2017	(Spain) Álex Albistegi	(Spain) Mirandés	Transfer	Free	
7 July 2017	(Spain) Jordi Codina	(Spain) Fuenlabrada	Transfer	Free	
4 August 2017	(Spain) Marcos Tébar	(India) Pune City	Transfer	Free	

== Competitions ==
=== Overall ===
Competition	Final position
Segunda División	-
Copa del Rey	-

=== Liga ===
==== League table ====
Pos	Team	Pld	W	D	L	GF	GA	GD	Pts
12	Lugo	42	15	10	17	39	48	−9	55
13	Alcorcón	42	12	16	14	37	42	−5	52 (Note: Alcorcón finished ahead of Reus and Gimnàstic on head-to-head points: Alcorcón 10 pts, Reus 5 pts, Gimnàstic 1 pt)
14	Reus	42	12	16	14	31	42	−11	52
15	Gimnàstic	42	15	7	20	44	50	−6	52
16	Córdoba	42	15	6	21	57	65	−8	51

Source: La Liga
Rules for classification: 1) points; 2) head-to-head points; 3) head-to-head goal difference; 4) goal difference; 5) number of goals scored

==== Matches ====
Kickoff times are in CET. Win Draw Loss

Match	Opponent	Venue	Result
1	Lugo	A	0–0
2	Nàstic	H	1–1
3	Oviedo	A	3–0
4	Numancia	H	1–0
5	Lorca	A	1–1
6	Osasuna		–
7	Sevilla At		–
8	Cultural		–
9	Huesca		–
10	Rayo		–
11	Almería		–
12	Valladolid		–
13	Sporting		–
14	Cádiz		–
15	Albacete		–
16	Zaragoza		–
17	Barcelona B		–
18	Tenerife		–
19	Granada		–
20	Córdoba		–
21	Alcorcón		–

Match	Opponent	Venue	Result
22			–
23			–
24			–
25			–
26			–
27			–
28			–
29			–
30			–
31			–
32			–
33			–
34			–
35			–
36			–
37			–
38			–
39			–
40			–
41			–
42			–
