= Raphael Guzzo =

Brazilian-born Portuguese footballer

Personal information
- Full name: Raphael Gregório Guzzo
- Date of birth: 6 January 1995 (age 31)
- Place of birth: São Paulo, Brazil
- Height: 1.77 m (5 ft 9 1/2 in)
- Position: Midfielder

Team information
- Current team: Marítimo
- Number: 14

Youth career
- 2003–2005: AD Flaviense
- 2006–2008: Chaves
- 2008–2014: Benfica

Senior career*
Years	Team	Apps	(Gls)
2013–2016	Benfica B	23	(3)
2014–2015	→ Chaves (loan)	33	(7)
2015–2016	→ Tondela (loan)	16	(0)
2016–2019	Reus	26	(0)
2018–2019	→ Famalicão (loan)	13	(1)
2019–2021	Chaves	29	(2)
2021–2023	Vizela	69	(10)
2023	Goiás	14	(1)
2024	Chaves	17	(2)
2024–2025	Neftçi	15	(0)
2025–	Marítimo	31	(2)

International career
2010–2011	Portugal U16	11	(0)
2011–2012	Portugal U17	12	(1)
2012–2013	Portugal U18	8	(1)
2013–2014	Portugal U19	19	(2)
2014–2015	Portugal U20	8	(1)
2015	Portugal U21	3	(0)
Medal record
Men's football
Representing Portugal
UEFA European Under-19 Championship
Runner-up	2014 Hungary
- * Club domestic league appearances and goals as of 19 June 2026

Raphael Gregório Guzzo (born 6 January 1995) is a professional footballer who plays as a midfielder for Primeira Liga club Marítimo.

Developed at Benfica, where he was only a reserve, he played 87 Primeira Liga games and scored six goals for Tondela, Vizela and Chaves. He also competed in Spain's Segunda División with Reus, the Campeonato Brasileiro Série A with Góias and the Azerbaijan Premier League with Neftçi.

Born in Brazil, Guzzo represented Portugal at youth level.

== Club career ==
=== Benfica ===
Guzzo was born in São Paulo, Brazil, moving to Portugal before his tenth birthday and starting playing football with Associação Desportiva Flaviense. In 2008, the 13-year-old joined S.L. Benfica's youth system.

On 6 January 2013, still a junior, Guzzo made his professional debut with the latter's reserve team, starting in a 1–1 home draw against C.D. Santa Clara in the Segunda Liga. He scored his first goal in the competition the following month, contributing to a 4–1 home win over C.F. União.

On 30 August 2014, Guzzo was loaned to second tier club G.D. Chaves in a season-long deal. The following 10 August, still owned by Benfica, he signed with C.D. Tondela, but the loan was terminated on 28 January 2016. His maiden appearance in the Primeira Liga with the latter took place on 14 August 2015, when he came on as a late substitute for Luís Machado in a 1–2 home loss to Sporting CP.

=== Reus ===
On 31 August 2016, Guzzo joined Spanish Segunda División side CF Reus Deportiu. His first match in the competition took place on 22 September, when he played 19 minutes in a 1–0 away win against Real Oviedo.

Guzzo returned to his adopted homeland on 16 August 2018, being loaned to F.C. Famalicão for one year. He played 13 times as they won promotion to the top flight as runners-up, and scored in a 3–1 defeat of former team Benfica B on 20 April 2019.

=== Vizela ===
On 2 August 2019, Guzzo returned to Chaves as a free agent and agreed to a two-year contract. In February 2021, however, he moved to F.C. Vizela also in division two on a deal until June 2022. He scored six goals until the end of that season in only 15 matches, helping the latter return to the top tier after 36 years.

Guzzo put pen to paper to a one-year extension on 7 July 2021. He scored his first top-flight goal the following 22 January to equalise in a 3–2 win on his return to Tondela, adding another eight days later in a victory by the same score at home to Vitória de Guimarães.

On 7 July 2023, Vizela announced Guzzo's departure after his contract expired.

=== Goiás ===
On 18 July 2023, Guzzo returned to his home country and signed a six-month deal with Goiás Esporte Clube. He made his debut in the Campeonato Brasileiro Série A on 13 August, playing the final half-hour of a 1–0 win at América Futebol Clube (MG), and scored his only goal for Armando Evangelista's men as the winner away to Coritiba Foot Ball Club on 5 November; he was released at the end of his contract following relegation.

=== Later career ===
Guzzo returned for a third spell at Chaves in January 2024, signing a contract until the end of the season. He scored against Boavista FC (2–1 victory) and F.C. Arouca (5–1 loss, also at home), in an eventual relegation as last.

On 12 August 2024, Guzzo joined Azerbaijan Premier League club Neftçi PFK on a two-year deal. In June 2025, however, he left by mutual agreement.

On 13 August 2025, Guzzo went back to Portugal and agreed to a two-year contract at second-tier C.S. Marítimo.

== International career ==
Guzzo represented Portugal at the 2014 UEFA European Under-19 Championship. Also with his adopted nation, he took part in the 2015 FIFA U-20 World Cup, scoring his team's first goal in the 2–1 victory over New Zealand in the round of 16.

== Career statistics ==
As of match played 15 May 2026

Appearances and goals by club, season and competition
Club	Season	League			National cup		League cup		Other		Total	
Club	Season	Division	Apps	Goals	Apps	Goals	Apps	Goals	Apps	Goals	Apps	Goals
Benfica B	2012–13	Segunda Liga	13	1	—		—		—		13	1
Benfica B	2013–14	Segunda Liga	0	0	—		—		—		0	0
Benfica B	2015–16	LigaPro	10	2	—		—		—		10	2
Benfica B	Total		23	3	—		—		—		23	3
Chaves (loan)	2014–15	Segunda Liga	33	7	3	1	1	0	—		37	8
Tondela (loan)	2015–16	Primeira Liga	16	0	1	0	0	0	—		17	0
Reus	2016–17	Segunda División	17	0	1	0	—		—		18	0
Reus	2017–18	Segunda División	9	0	0	0	—		—		9	0
Reus	Total		26	0	1	0	—		—		27	0
Famalicão (loan)	2018–19	LigaPro	13	1	1	0	—		—		14	1
Chaves	2019–20	LigaPro	18	2	3	0	2	0	—		23	2
Chaves	2020–21	Liga Portugal 2	11	0	1	0	—		—		12	0
Chaves	Total		29	2	4	0	2	0	—		35	2
Vizela	2020–21	Liga Portugal 2	15	6	0	0	—		—		15	6
Vizela	2021–22	Primeira Liga	24	2	3	0	1	0	—		28	2
Vizela	2022–23	Primeira Liga	30	2	2	0	3	1	—		35	3
Vizela	Total		69	10	5	0	4	1	—		78	11
Goiás	2023	Série A	14	1	0	0	—		0	0	14	1
Chaves	2023–24	Primeira Liga	17	2	0	0	0	0	—		17	2
Neftçi	2024–25	Azerbaijan Premier League	15	0	0	0	—		—		15	0
Marítimo	2025–26	Liga Portugal 2	31	2	1	0	—		—		32	2
Career total			286	28	16	1	7	1	0	0	309	30

== Honours ==
Marítimo

- Liga Portugal 2: 2025–26
