= 2016–17 CF Reus Deportiu season =

CF Reus Deportiu
2016–17 season
- Manager: Natxo González
- Stadium: Estadi Municipal
- Segunda División: 11th
Home colours

The 2016–17 season is the 108th season in Reus Deportiu ’s history.

== Squad ==
As of 1 February 2017

Note: Flags indicate national team as defined under FIFA eligibility rules; some limited exceptions apply. Players may hold more than one non-FIFA nationality.

No.	Pos.	Nation	Player
1	GK	(Spain) ESP	Jordi Codina
2	DF	(Spain) ESP	Alberto Benito
3	DF	(Spain) ESP	Ángel Martínez
4	DF	(Spain) ESP	Jesús Olmo
5	DF	(Serbia) SRB	Srđan Babić (on loan from Real Sociedad)
6	MF	(Portugal) POR	Vítor Silva
7	FW	(Spain) ESP	David Querol
8	MF	(Spain) ESP	Ramón Folch (captain)
9	FW	(Spain) ESP	Edgar Hernández
10	MF	(Portugal) POR	Ricardo Vaz
11	MF	(Spain) ESP	Fran Carbià

No.	Pos.	Nation	Player
12	DF	(Spain) ESP	Joan Campins
13	GK	(Spain) ESP	Édgar Badía
14	MF	(Spain) ESP	Marcos Tébar
15	DF	(Spain) ESP	Melli
16	FW	(Nigeria) NGA	Macky Chrisantus
17	MF	(Spain) ESP	David Haro
18	DF	(Spain) ESP	Pichu Atienza
19	MF	(Spain) ESP	Alex Albistegi
20	MF	(Uruguay) URU	Jorge Díaz (on loan from Zaragoza)
21	FW	(Spain) ESP	Máyor
22	MF	(Spain) ESP	Aritz López Garai
23	DF	(Spain) ESP	Migue García
24	MF	(Spain) ESP	Jorge Miramón

== Competitions ==
=== Liga ===
==== League table ====
Pos	Team	Pld	W	D	L	GF	GA	GD	Pts	Promotion, qualification or relegation
9	Lugo	42	14	13	15	49	52	−3	55 (Note: Lugo and Córdoba finished ahead of Reus on head-to-head points: Lugo 7 pts, Córdoba 7 pts, Reus 3 pts. Lugo finished ahead of Córdoba on head-to-head points: Córdoba 3–3 Lugo, Lugo 1–0 Córdoba)	
10	Córdoba	42	14	13	15	42	52	−10	55	
11	Reus	42	13	16	13	31	29	+2	55	
12	Rayo Vallecano	42	14	11	17	44	44	0	53 (Note: Rayo Vallecano finished ahead of Sevilla Atlético on head-to-head points: Rayo Vallecano 1–1 Sevilla Atlético, Sevilla Atlético 1–2 Rayo Vallecano)	
13	Sevilla Atlético	42	13	14	15	55	56	−1	53	Ineligible for promotion and the Copa del Rey

Source: La Liga
Rules for classification: 1) points; 2) head-to-head points; 3) head-to-head goal difference; 4) goal difference; 5) number of goals scored
