= Joan Campins =

Spanish footballer

Personal information
- Full name: Joan Campins Vidal
- Date of birth: 24 June 1995 (age 31)
- Place of birth: Sa Pobla, Spain
- Height: 1.80 m (5 ft 11 in)
- Position: Right back

Team information
- Current team: Atlètic Lleida
- Number: 20

Youth career
- 1999–2011: Poblense
- 2011–2013: Mallorca
- 2013–2014: Barcelona

Senior career*
Years	Team	Apps	(Gls)
2012–2013	Mallorca B	19	(1)
2013–2016	Barcelona B	15	(0)
2016	→ Zaragoza (loan)	9	(0)
2016–2018	Reus	24	(0)
2019	MOL Vidi	0	(0)
2019–2020	Royal Excel Mouscron	5	(1)
2021	Tarazona	25	(0)
2022	Costa Brava	17	(1)
2022	UD Logroñés	11	(0)
2023–2025	Lleida Esportiu	63	(4)
2025–	Atlètic Lleida	32	(4)

International career
2013	Spain U19	3	(0)
- * Club domestic league appearances and goals as of 15 May 2026

Joan Campins Vidal (born 24 June 1995) is a Spanish professional footballer who plays for Segunda Federación club Atlètic Lleida. Mainly a right back, he can also play as a winger.

== Club career ==
Born in Sa Pobla, Majorca, Balearic Islands, Campins finished his graduation with local RCD Mallorca. He made his senior debuts with the reserves in 2012–13 season, in Segunda División B.

On 2 August 2013, Campins signed a four-year deal with FC Barcelona, being initially assigned to B-team in Segunda División. On 8 September, Campins made his professional debut, in a 2–2 away draw against CD Tenerife.

On 29 January 2016, Campins was loaned to Real Zaragoza also in the second tier. On 13 August, he signed a two-year contract with fellow league team CF Reus Deportiu.

== Club statistics ==
As of match played 13 March 2021

Club	Season	League			National Cup		Other		Total	
Club	Season	Division	Apps	Goals	Apps	Goals	Apps	Goals	Apps	Goals
Mallorca B	2012–13	Segunda División B	19	1	—		—		19	1
Barcelona B	2013–14	Segunda División	1	0	—		—		1	0
Barcelona B	2014–15	Segunda División	6	0	—		—		6	0
Barcelona B	2015–16	Segunda División B	8	0	—		—		8	0
Barcelona B	Total		15	0	0	0	0	0	15	0
Zaragoza (loan)	2015–16	Segunda División	9	0	0	0	—		9	0
Reus	2016–17	Segunda División	9	0	1	0	—		10	0
Reus	2017–18	Segunda División	15	0	0	0	—		15	0
Reus	Total		24	0	1	0	0	0	25	0
MOL Vidi	2018–19	NB I	0	0	0	0	—		0	0
Royal Excel Mouscron	2019–20	Belgian First Division A	10	1	2	0	—		12	1
Tarazona	2020–21	Segunda División B	5	0	0	0	—		5	0
Career total			82	2	3	0	0	0	85	2

== Honours ==
Barcelona

- UEFA Youth League: 2013–14
