= Diego Rosa (footballer, born 2002) =

Brazilian footballer

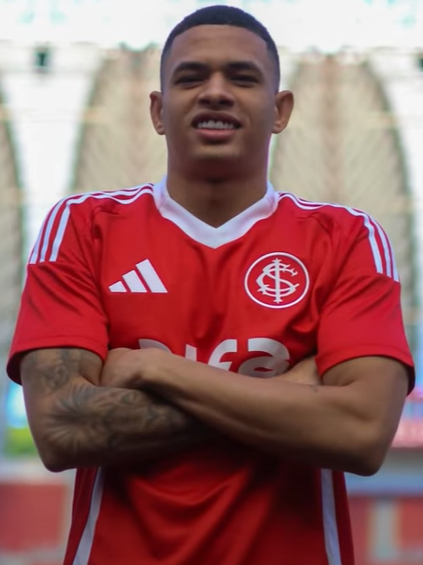

Personal information
- Full name: Diego Gabriel Silva Rosa
- Date of birth: 12 October 2002 (age 24)
- Place of birth: Salvador, Brazil
- Height: 1.82 m (6 ft 0 in)
- Position: Midfielder

Team information
- Current team: Qarabağ FK
- Number: 0

Youth career
- –2018: Vitória
- 2018–2021: Grêmio

Senior career*
Years	Team	Apps	(Gls)
2021–2023	Manchester City	0	(0)
2021–2022	→ Lommel (loan)	26	(2)
2022–2023	→ Vizela (loan)	9	(0)
2023–2025	Bahia	21	(1)
2024–2025	→ Lommel (loan)	27	(7)
2025	→ Internacional (loan)	7	(0)
2025–2026	APOEL FC	30	(2)
2026–2027	→Qarabağ FK (loan)	0	(0)

International career^{‡}
2018	Brazil U16	3	(0)
2018–2019	Brazil U17	11	(2)
- * Club domestic league appearances and goals as of 31 May 2026 ‡ National team caps and goals as of 03:39, 11 March 2021 (UTC)

Diego Gabriel Silva Rosa (born 12 October 2002) is a Brazilian professional footballer who plays as a midfielder for Azerbaijani Premier League club Qarabağ FK, on loan from Cypriot First Division club APOEL FC.

== Club career ==
After 18 months on loan in Belgium with City Football Group sister club Lommel, Rosa joined Primeira Liga side Vizela on loan in July 2022 from Manchester City.

In the 2022/23 season, EC Bahia acquired his rights for 2,000,000 euros, with a contract running until 2027.

On 1 February 2024, Rosa returned to Lommel on loan.

In 2025 he played for Brazilian club Sport Club Internacional on loan from EC Bahia.

On 7 August 2025, the player officially joined APOEL Nicosia, following an agreement between APOEL and Bahia. He has signed a contract for 3 years, until May 2028.

30 August 2026: APOEL announced the loan transfer of Diego Rosa to Qarabağ FK. The agreement includes an option for Qarabağ FK to purchase the player in the summer of 2027, subject to specific conditions. In the event that the purchase option is exercised, APOEL will retain a significant percentage of the player's rights.

== Career statistics ==
=== Club ===
As of 10 March 2023

Club	Season	League			State League		Cup		Continental		Other		Total	
Club	Season	Division	Apps	Goals	Apps	Goals	Apps	Goals	Apps	Goals	Apps	Goals	Apps	Goals
Manchester City	2020–21	Premier League	0	0	—		0	0	0	0	0	0	0	0
Lommel (loan)	2020–21	Proximus League	7	0	—		0	0	—		0	0	7	0
Lommel (loan)	2021–22	Proximus League	19	2	—		3	0	—		0	0	22	2
Lommel (loan)	Total		26	2	—		3	0	—		0	0	29	2
Vizela (loan)	2022–23	Primeira Liga	9	0	—		2	0	—		0	0	11	0
Bahia (loan)	2023	Série A	0	0	4 (Note: Appearance(s) in Campeonato Baiano)	0	0	0	—		4 (Note: Appearance(s) in Copa do Nordeste)	0	8	0
Career total			35	2	4	0	5	0	0	0	4	0	48	2

== Honours ==
Bahia

- Campeonato Baiano: 2023
