= Nuno Moreira =

Portuguese footballer

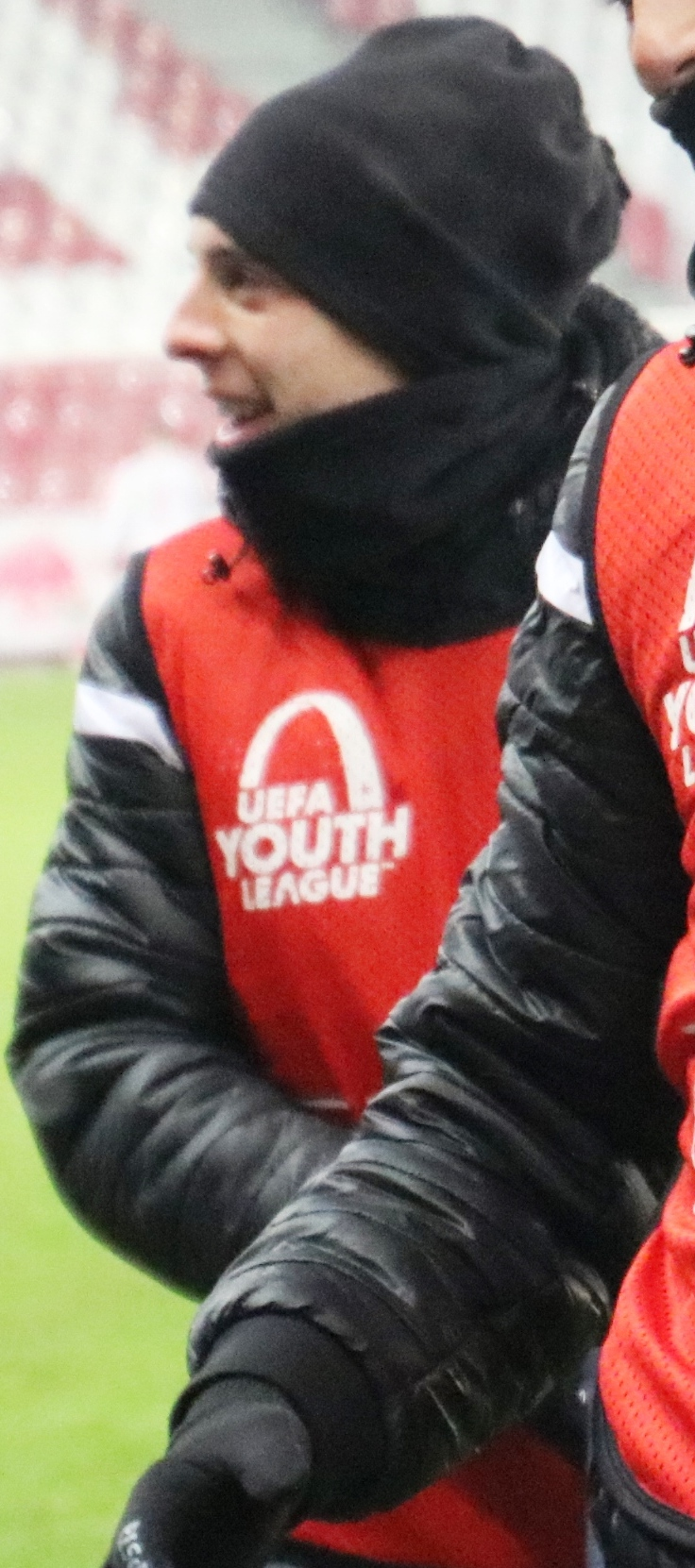
- Moreira with Sporting CP in 2018

Personal information
- Full name: Nuno Gonçalo Rocha Moreira
- Date of birth: 16 June 1999 (age 27)
- Place of birth: Espinho, Portugal
- Height: 1.75 m (5 ft 9 in)
- Position: Winger

Team information
- Current team: Vasco da Gama
- Number: 17

Youth career
- 2007–2020: Sporting CP

Senior career*
Years	Team	Apps	(Gls)
2020–2021	Sporting CP B	25	(6)
2021–2024	Vizela	74	(3)
2024–2025	Casa Pia	36	(7)
2025–	Vasco da Gama	63	(9)
- * Club domestic league appearances and goals as of 23:58, 23 August 2026 (UTC)

Nuno Gonçalo Rocha Moreira (born 16 June 1999) is a Portuguese professional footballer who plays as a winger for Campeonato Brasileiro Série A club Vasco da Gama.

== Club career ==
=== Sporting CP ===
Born in Espinho, Aveiro District, Moreira spent his entire youth career in Lisbon with Sporting CP. He made his senior debut with the club's under-23 team, later appearing for the reserve one.

Moreira scored his first goal for Sporting B on 25 October 2020, closing the 4–1 home win against B-SAD B in the third division.

=== Vizela ===
On 19 June 2021, Moreira signed a three-year contract with F.C. Vizela, with Sporting retaining 50% of the player's rights. He played his first match as a professional on 24 July, coming off at half-time of an eventual 2–1 away loss to C.F. Estrela da Amadora in the first round of the Taça da Liga. His Primeira Liga bow took place on 6 August, when he replaced the same player who had replaced him the previous game, Francis Cann, in the 3–0 defeat at former side Sporting.

Moreira scored for the first time in the top flight on 30 April 2022, in a 4–2 away loss against eventual champions FC Porto.

=== Casa Pia ===
On 30 January 2024, Moreira joined fellow top-division side Casa Pia A.C. on a two-and-a-half-year deal. On 29 December that year, he closed the 2–1 away win over S.C. Braga.

On 25 January 2025, Moreira was one of three players on target as the hosts defeated S.L. Benfica 3–1.

=== Vasco da Gama ===
Moreira joined CR Vasco da Gama of the Campeonato Brasileiro Série A on 20 February 2025, for a €3.5 million fee. On his debut on 5 March, he provided an assist in a 3–0 away defeat of Nova Iguaçu FC in the second round of the Copa do Brasil. He scored in the following match, but in a 2–1 loss at CR Flamengo in the semi-finals of the Campeonato Carioca.

== Career statistics ==
As of match played 15 September 2026

Appearances and goals by club, season and competition
Club	Season	League			State league (Note: Includes Campeonato Carioca)		National cup (Note: Includes Taça de Portugal, Copa do Brasil)		League cup (Note: Includes Taça da Liga)		Continental		Total	
Club	Season	Division	Apps	Goals	Apps	Goals	Apps	Goals	Apps	Goals	Apps	Goals	Apps	Goals
Sporting CP B	2020–21	Campeonato de Portugal	25	6	—		—		—		—		25	6
Vizela	2021–22	Primeira Liga	30	1	—		2	1	1	0	—		33	2
Vizela	2022–23	Primeira Liga	29	1	—		2	0	3	0	—		34	1
Vizela	2023–24	Primeira Liga	15	1	—		2	0	2	1	—		19	2
Vizela	Total		74	3	—		6	1	6	1	—		86	5
Casa Pia	2023–24	Primeira Liga	15	2	—		0	0	0	0	—		15	2
Casa Pia	2024–25	Primeira Liga	21	5	—		2	4	—		—		23	9
Casa Pia	Total		36	7	—		2	4	0	0	—		38	11
Vasco da Gama	2025	Série A	36	7	1	1	11	3	—		8 (Note: Appearances in Copa Sudamericana)	0	56	11
Vasco da Gama	2026	Série A	19	1	7	0	4	0	—		12	1	42	2
Vasco da Gama	Total		55	8	8	1	15	3	—		20	1	98	13
Career total			190	24	8	1	23	8	6	1	20	1	247	35
