= Alexander Schmidt (footballer) =

Austrian footballer

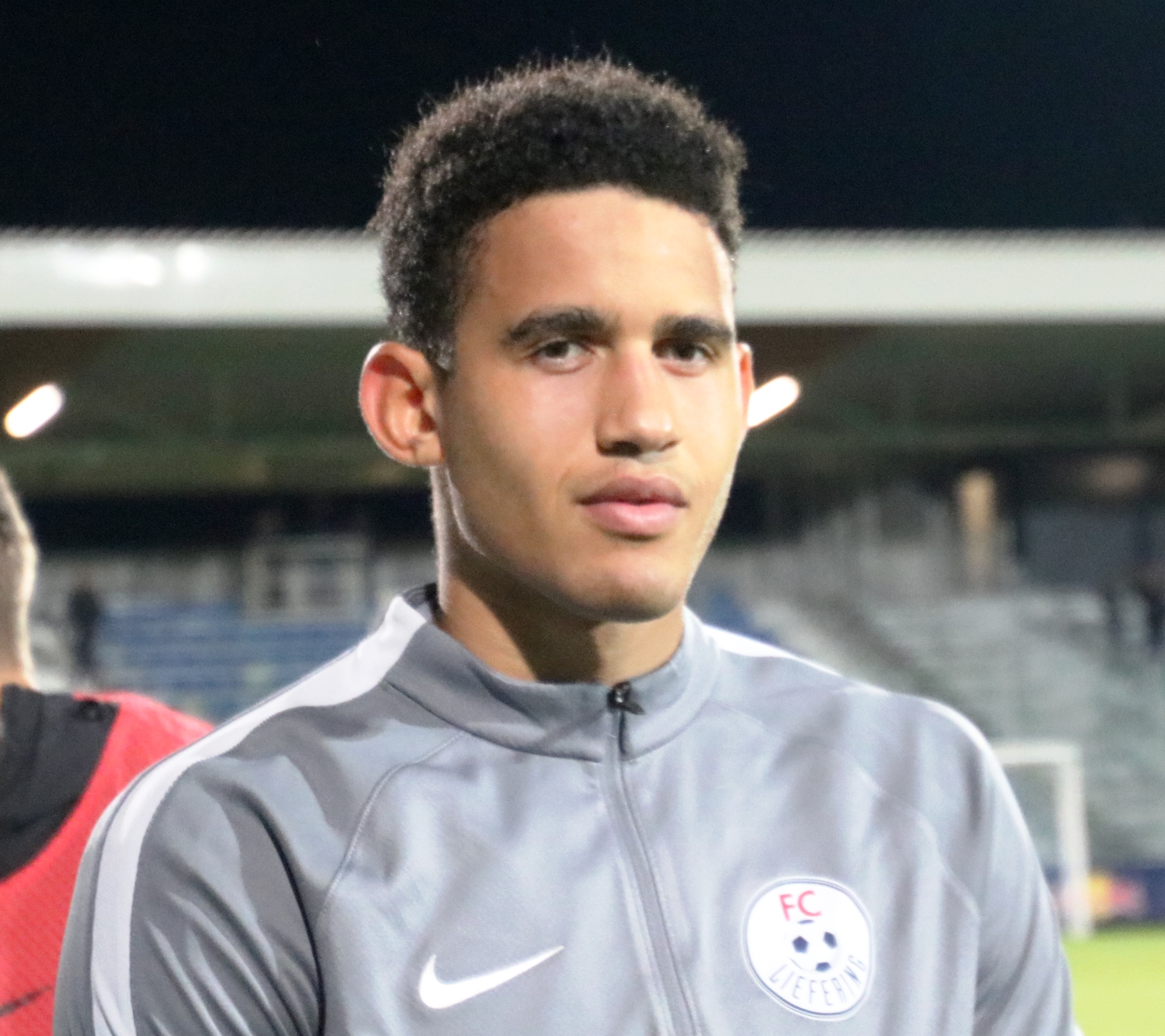
- Schmidt with Liefering in 2016

Personal information
- Date of birth: 19 January 1998 (age 28)
- Place of birth: Vienna, Austria
- Height: 1.93 m (6 ft 4 in)
- Position: Striker

Team information
- Current team: Admira Wacker
- Number: 10

Youth career
- 2005–2012: First Vienna FC
- 2012–2016: Red Bull Salzburg

Senior career*
Years	Team	Apps	(Gls)
2016–2020	FC Liefering	36	(8)
2019–2020	→ Wolfsberger AC (loan)	19	(0)
2020–2022	LASK	22	(2)
2020–2021	→ SKN St. Pölten (loan)	28	(13)
2022–2023	Vizela	10	(0)
2023–2024	Austria Wien	18	(3)
2024–2025	Blau-Weiß Linz	27	(1)
2025–	Admira Wacker	34	(13)

International career^{‡}
2015	Austria U17	3	(0)
2019–2020	Austria U21	3	(0)
- * Club domestic league appearances and goals as of 11:54, 20 November 2026 (UTC) ‡ National team caps and goals as of 9 October 2020

Alexander Schmidt (born 19 January 1998) is an Austrian professional footballer who plays as a striker for Admiral 2nd League club Admira Wacker.

== Early life ==
Schmidt was born in Vienna to a Senegalese father, Samba Diallo, and an Austrian mother, Karin Schmidt, from whom he inherits his surname. He has two sisters, fellow footballer Catherine Schmidt, who plays for SKN St. Pölten women's team, and Marie Schmidt.

== Club career ==
He made his Austrian Football First League debut for FC Liefering on 1 November 2016 in a game against Austria Lustenau.

He scored the winning goal for Red Bull Salzburg against Benfica in the final of the 2016–17 UEFA Youth League.

On 15 August 2020, he signed a three-year contract with LASK and was loaned to SKN St. Pölten for the 2020–21 season.

On 1 September 2022, Schmidt signed a two-year deal with Portuguese Primeira Liga side Vizela.

On 6 August 2023, Vizela announced that Schmidt's contract had been terminated by mutual agreement. Three days later, Austrian Football Bundesliga club Austria Wien announced the signing of Schmidt on a one-year deal, with an option for a further year.

On 5 July 2024, Schmidt signed with Blau-Weiß Linz for one season, with an option to extend.

On 8 July 2025, Schmidt signed for Admira Wacker.

== Career statistics ==
=== Club ===
As of match played 23 August 2023

Appearances and goals by club, season and competition
Club	Season	League			National Cup (Note: Includes Austrian Cup, Taça de Portugal)		League Cup (Note: Includes Taça da Liga)		Europe		Other		Total	
Club	Season	Division	Apps	Goals	Apps	Goals	Apps	Goals	Apps	Goals	Apps	Goals	Apps	Goals
FC Liefering	2016–17	2. Liga	6	0	—		—		—		—		6	0
FC Liefering	2017–18	2. Liga	17	4	—		—		—		—		17	4
FC Liefering	2018–19	2. Liga	13	4	—		—		—		—		13	4
FC Liefering	Total		36	8	—		—		—		—		36	8
Wolfsberger AC (loan)	2019–20	Austrian Bundesliga	19	0	2	0	—		4 (Note: Appearance(s) in UEFA Europa League)	0	—		25	0
SKN St. Pölten (loan)	2020–21	Austrian Bundesliga	28	13	2	0	—		—		2 (Note: Appearance(s) in play-off)	0	32	13
LASK	2021–22	Austrian Bundesliga	20	2	2	0	—		9 (Note: Appearance(s) in UEFA Conference League)	2	—		31	4
LASK	2022–23	Austrian Bundesliga	2	0	1	1	—		—		—		3	1
LASK	Total		22	2	3	1	—		9	2	—		34	5
LASK II	2022–23	Austrian Regionalliga	1	0	—		—		—		—		1	0
Vizela	2022–23	Primeira Liga	10	0	1	0	1	0	—		—		12	0
Career total			116	23	8	1	1	0	13	2	2	0	140	26
