= Valdo (footballer, born 1992) =

Brazilian footballer

Personal information
- Full name: Andrevaldo de Jesus Santos
- Date of birth: 10 February 1992 (age 34)
- Place of birth: Aracaju, Sergipe, Brazil
- Height: 1.83 m (6 ft 0 in)
- Position: Centre back

Team information
- Current team: Floresta
- Number: 14

Youth career
- 2009–2011: Confiança

Senior career*
Years	Team	Apps	(Gls)
2010–2016	Confiança	103	(6)
2012	→ Botafogo-PB (loan)	0	(0)
2013	→ Araripina (loan)	16	(0)
2016–2020	Ceará	95	(4)
2020–2022	Shimizu S-Pulse	70	(7)
2023–2024	V-Varen Nagasaki	23	(1)
2025	Confiança	9	(1)
2026–	Floresta	7	(0)
- * Club domestic league appearances and goals as of 9 November 2026

Andrevaldo de Jesus Santos (born 10 February 1992), commonly known as Valdo, is a Brazilian professional footballer as a centre back who plays for Floresta.

== Club career ==
Born in Aracaju, Valdo graduated from the youth setup of Associação Desportiva Confiança and was promoted to the senior team in 2011. On 28 August 2012, he was loaned to Botafogo PB for the 2013 campaign of Campeonato Paraibano. While at the club, he won the 2014 and 2015 seasons of Campeonato Sergipano besides achieving promotion to Série C in 2014.

Valdo joined Série B club Ceará in May 2016, after agreeing to a two-year deal. On 15 June 2016, he made his debut for the club, playing the whole ninety minutes of a 3–0 victory against Brasil de Pelotas.

On 25 January 2020, Valdo went on his first overseas experience as a professional footballer, signing for J1 club Shimizu S-Pulse. He debuted for the club in a J.League Cup match against Kawasaki Frontale on 16 February.

On 28 December 2022, Valdo was unveiled as a new recruitment for V-Varen Nagasaki ahead of the 2023 season.

On 02 January 2025, Aldo was signed by Série B club Paysandu

== Personal life ==
Valdo's younger brother Anderson is also a footballer and a centre back. He was also groomed at Confiança.

== Career statistics ==
As of the end of 2022 season

Club	Season	League			State League		Cup		Continental		Other		Total	
Club	Season	Division	Apps	Goals	Apps	Goals	Apps	Goals	Apps	Goals	Apps	Goals	Apps	Goals
Confiança	2010	Série D	0	0	3	0	—		—		—		3	0
Confiança	2011	Sergipano	—		6	0	—		—		—		6	0
Confiança	2012	Sergipano	—		10	1	—		—		—		10	1
Confiança	2013	Sergipano	—		12	0	3	0	—		6 (Note: Appearance(s) in Copa do Nordeste)	0	21	0
Confiança	2014	Série D	9	1	17	0	—		—		5	1	31	2
Confiança	2015	Série C	14	1	15	1	2	0	—		5	0	36	2
Confiança	2016	Série C	2	1	15	1	2	0	—		2	0	21	2
Confiança	Total		25	3	78	3	7	0	—		18	1	128	7
Botafogo-PB (loan)	2012	Paraibano	—		0	0	—		—		4 (Note: Appearance(s) in Copa Paraíba)	0	4	0
Araripina (loan)	2013	Pernambucano Série A2	—		16	0	—		—		—		16	0
Ceará	2016	Série B	18	0	—		—		—		—		18	0
Ceará	2017	Série B	12	2	4	0	—		—		0	0	18	2
Ceará	2018	Série A	17	1	7	1	4	0	—		7	1	35	3
Ceará	2019	Série A	30	0	7	0	2	0	—		8	0	47	0
Ceará	Total		77	3	34	1	6	0	—		19	1	138	5
Shimizu S-Pulse	2020	J1 League	29	4	—		0	0	—		1 (Note: Appearance(s) in J. League Cup)	0	30	4
Shimizu S-Pulse	2021	J1 League	33	2	—		3	0	—		7	0	43	2
Shimizu S-Pulse	2022	J1 League	8	1	—		0	0	—		2	0	10	1
V-Varen Nagasaki	2023	J2 League	0	0	—		0	0	—		-		0	0
V-Varen Nagasaki	Total		70	7	—		3	0	—		10	0	83	7
Career total			172	13	112	4	16	0	0	0	47	2	349	19

== Honours ==
Confiança

- Campeonato Sergipano: 2014, 2015

Ceará

- Campeonato Cearense: 2017, 2018
