= Yonas Malede =

Israeli footballer

Personal information
- Date of birth: 14 November 1999 (age 26)
- Place of birth: Kiryat Bialik, Israel
- Height: 1.89 m (6 ft 2 in)
- Position: Forward

Team information
- Current team: Hapoel Be'er Sheva
- Number: 14

Youth career
- 2010–2012: Maccabi Tzur Shalom
- 2012–2015: Hapoel Haifa
- 2015–2019: Maccabi Netanya

Senior career*
Years	Team	Apps	(Gls)
2018–2021	Maccabi Netanya	73	(11)
2021–2022	Gent	35	(1)
2022–2024	Mechelen	40	(0)
2024–2026	Maccabi Tel Aviv	21	(2)
2026–	Hapoel Be'er Sheva	4	(0)

International career^{‡}
2017	Israel U19	1	(0)
2018–2020	Israel U21	7	(1)
2021–	Israel	2	(0)
- * Club domestic league appearances and goals as of 10:50, 19 October 2026 (UTC) ‡ National team caps and goals as of 01:28, 29 August 2021 (UTC)

Yonas Malede (or Yunes, Hebrew: יונס מלדה; born 14 November 1999) is an Israeli professional footballer who plays as a forward for Israeli Premier League club Hapoel Be'er Sheva and the Israel national team.

== Early life ==
Malede was born in Kiryat Bialik, Israel, to an Ethiopian-Jewish family.

== Club career ==
A Maccabi Netanya youth product, Malede was promoted to the senior team on 24 February 2018 as he made his debut in a league fixture against Maccabi Haifa.

After three seasons with the club, Malede moved to play in the Belgian First Division A as he signed a 4.5-year contract with Gent for a €1.5 million transfer fee.

On 15 June 2022, Malede signed a three-year contract with Mechelen.

On 31 January 2024 signed for 3.5 years for Maccabi Tel Aviv.

== International career ==
Malede made his debut for Israel national team on 5 June 2021 in a friendly against Montenegro. He started the game and was substituted in the 61st minute with the score at 0–0, the game ended in a 3–1 victory for Israel.

== Career statistics ==
=== Club ===
As of match played 23 August 2023

Appearances and goals by club, season and competition
Club	Season	League			National Cup (Note: Includes Israel State Cup, Belgian Cup)		Europe		Other		Total	
Club	Season	Division	Apps	Goals	Apps	Goals	Apps	Goals	Apps	Goals	Apps	Goals
Maccabi Netanya	2017–18	Israeli Premier League	9	1	0	0	—		—		9	1
Maccabi Netanya	2018–19	Israeli Premier League	18	1	2	0	—		—		20	1
Maccabi Netanya	2019–20	Israeli Premier League	32	2	2	0	—		—		34	2
Maccabi Netanya	2020–21	Israeli Premier League	14	7	0	0	—		—		14	7
Maccabi Netanya	Total		73	11	4	0	—		—		77	11
Gent	2020–21	Belgian Pro League	5	0	0	0	0	0	6 (Note: Appearance(s) in play-off)	1	11	1
Gent	2021–22	Belgian Pro League	19	0	3	0	3 (Note: Appearance(s) in UEFA Conference League)	1	5	0	30	1
Gent	Total		24	0	3	0	3	1	11	1	41	2
KV Mechelen	2022–23	Belgian Pro League	27	0	5	2	—		—		32	2
KV Mechelen	2023–24	Belgian Pro League	13	0	1	0	—		—		14	0
KV Mechelen	Total		40	0	4	0	0	0	0	0	44	0
Maccabi Tel Aviv	2023–24	Israeli Premier League	0	0	0	0	0	0	0	0	0	0
Career total			137	11	13	2	3	1	11	1	164	15

== Honours ==
- Belgian Cup:
  - Winner (1): 2021–22
  - Runner-up (1): 2022–23
