= Jorge Miramón =

Spanish footballer

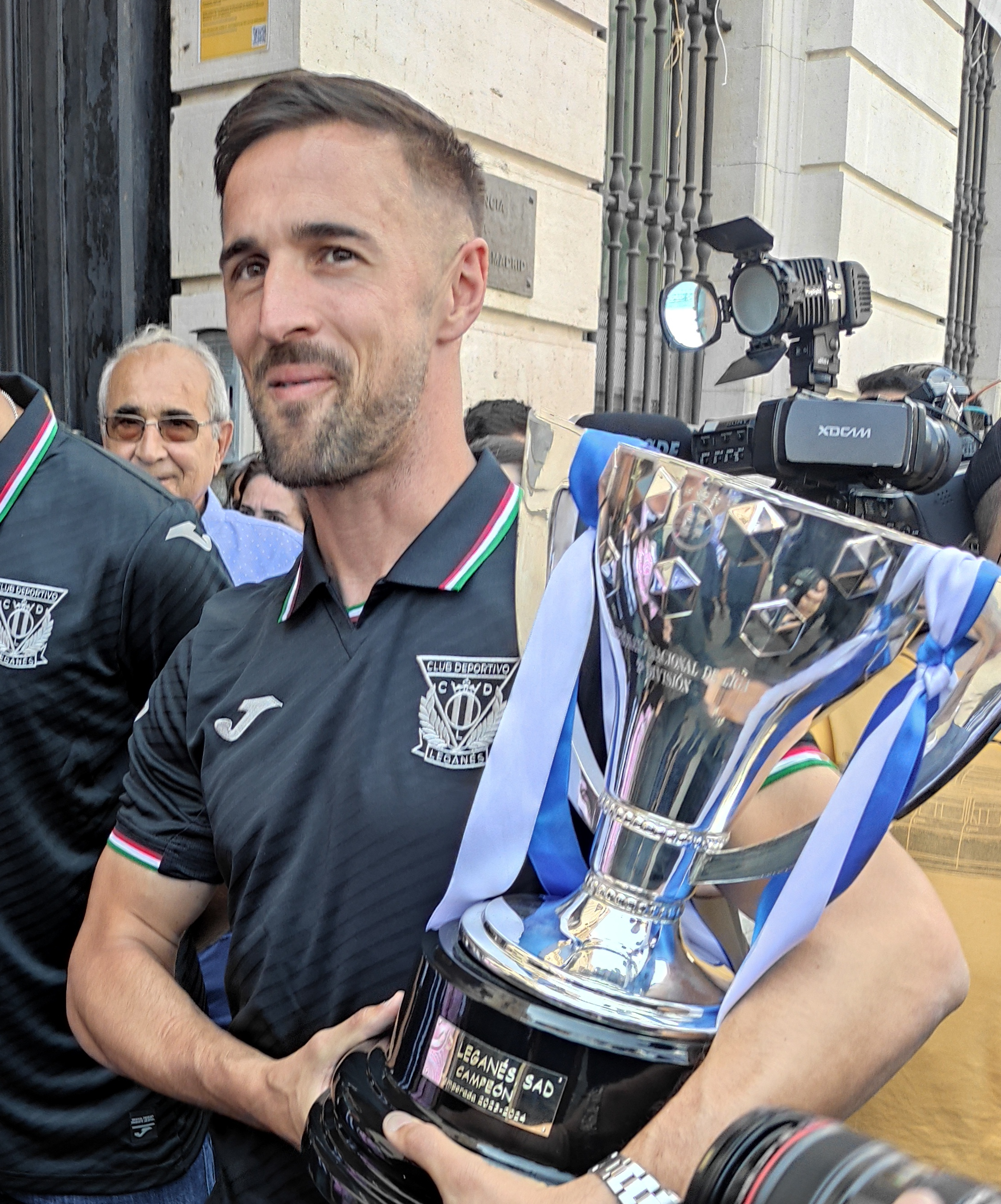
- Miramón with Leganés in 2024

Personal information
- Full name: Jorge Miramón Santagertrudis
- Date of birth: 2 June 1989 (age 37)
- Place of birth: Zaragoza, Spain
- Height: 1.75 m (5 ft 9 in)
- Positions: Right-back; midfielder

Team information
- Current team: AEK Larnaca
- Number: 21

Youth career
- Stadium Casablanca
- Zaragoza

Senior career*
| Years | Team | Apps | (Gls) |
| 2008–2010 | Zaragoza B | 58 | (6) |
| 2010–2011 | Atlético Madrid B | 11 | (0) |
| 2011–2012 | Andorra | 35 | (1) |
| 2012–2015 | Lleida Esportiu | 112 | (9) |
| 2015–2016 | Leganés | 22 | (1) |
| 2016–2018 | Reus | 75 | (2) |
| 2018–2019 | Huesca | 30 | (1) |
| 2019–2022 | Levante | 87 | (1) |
| 2022–2024 | Leganés | 66 | (2) |
| 2024– | AEK Larnaca | 59 | (3) |
- * Club domestic league appearances and goals as of 14 June 2026

Jorge Miramón Santagertrudis (born 2 June 1989) is a Spanish professional footballer who plays as either a right-back or a midfielder for Cypriot club AEK Larnaca.

== Club career ==
Born in Zaragoza, Aragon, Miramón graduated with Real Zaragoza's youth setup. He made his senior debuts for the reserves in 2008, in Tercera División. On 15 July 2010, he moved to another reserve team, Atlético Madrid B in Segunda División B.

In July 2011 Miramón signed for Andorra CF also in the third level. On 14 Jun, the following year he joined fellow league team Lleida Esportiu, after suffering administrative relegation with the latter.

On 6 July 2015, Miramón signed a one-year deal with CD Leganés in Segunda División. He made his professional debut on 23 August at the age of 26, coming on as a second-half substitute for Omar Ramos in a 2–3 away loss against UD Almería.

Miramón scored his first professional goal on 29 May 2016, netting the last in a 2–0 home win against UE Llagostera. He contributed with 22 appearances during the campaign, as his side achieved promotion to La Liga for the first time ever.

On 19 July 2016, Miramón signed a one-year contract with CF Reus Deportiu in the second division, after cutting ties with Lega. He was converted into a right back during his first season, and renewed his contract for a further campaign on 29 June 2017.

On 6 June 2018, Miramón signed a one-year deal with SD Huesca, newly promoted to La Liga. He made his debut in the main category on 19 August, starting in a 2–1 away win against SD Eibar.

On 28 June 2019, after suffering relegation, Miramón signed for Levante UD on a two-year deal. On 19 July 2022, after another drop, he returned to Leganés on a one-year contract.

On 6 August 2024, Miramón signed a contract with AEK Larnaca in Cyprus for one season, with an optional second.

== Career statistics ==
As of match played on 20 October 2023

Club statistics
| Club | Season | League | | | National Cup | | Other | | Total | |
| Club | Season | Division | Apps | Goals | Apps | Goals | Apps | Goals | Apps | Goals |
|---|---|---|---|---|---|---|---|---|---|---|
| Atlético B | 2010–11 | Segunda División B | 11 | 0 | — | | — | | 11 | 0 |
| Andorra | 2011–12 | Segunda División B | 35 | 1 | 2 | 0 | — | | 37 | 1 |
| Lleida Esportiu | 2012–13 | Segunda División B | 36 | 6 | 1 | 0 | 4 (Note: Appearances in the 2013 Segunda División B play-offs) | 0 | 41 | 6 |
| Lleida Esportiu | 2013–14 | Segunda División B | 38 | 2 | 4 | 0 | 4 (Note: Appearances in the 2014 Segunda División B play-offs) | 0 | 46 | 2 |
| Lleida Esportiu | 2014–15 | Segunda División B | 38 | 1 | 2 | 0 | — | | 40 | 1 |
| Lleida Esportiu | Total | | 112 | 9 | 7 | 0 | 8 | 0 | 127 | 9 |
| CD Leganés | 2015–16 | Segunda División | 22 | 1 | 1 | 0 | — | | 23 | 1 |
| Reus | 2016–17 | Segunda División | 41 | 0 | 1 | 0 | — | | 42 | 0 |
| Reus | 2017–18 | Segunda División | 34 | 2 | 1 | 0 | — | | 35 | 2 |
| Reus | Total | | 75 | 2 | 2 | 0 | 0 | 0!77 | 2 | |
| Huesca | 2018–19 | La Liga | 30 | 1 | 2 | 0 | — | | 32 | 1 |
| Levante | 2019–20 | La Liga | 32 | 0 | 0 | 0 | — | | 32 | 0 |
| Levante | 2020–21 | La Liga | 26 | 0 | 4 | 0 | — | | 30 | 0 |
| Levante | 2021–22 | La Liga | 29 | 1 | 1 | 0 | — | | 30 | 1 |
| Levante | Total | | 87 | 1 | 5 | 0 | 0 | 0 | 92 | 1 |
| Leganés | 2022–23 | Segunda División | 40 | 1 | 0 | 0 | — | | 40 | 1 |
| Leganés | 2023–24 | Segunda División | 5 | 1 | 0 | 0 | — | | 5 | 1 |
| Leganés | Total | | 45 | 2 | 0 | 0 | 0 | 0 | 45 | 2 |
| Career totals | | | 417 | 17 | 19 | 0 | 8 | 0 | 444 | 17 |

== Honours ==
Leganés

- Segunda División: 2023–24

AEK Larnaca

- Cypriot Cup: 2024–25
