= Emmanuel Adeyemo =

Nigerian footballer (born 2002)

Personal information
- Full name: Oluwapelumi Emmanuel Adeyemo
- Date of birth: May 21, 2002 (age 24)
- Place of birth: Ibadan, Nigeria
- Position: Midfielder

Team information
- Current team: Vizela
- Number: 28

Youth career
- Triple 44 Academy

Senior career*
Years	Team	Apps	(Gls)
2021–	Vizela	0	(0)
2021–	→Pedras Salgadas (loan)	0	(0)

International career^{‡}
2022	Nigeria U23	2	(0)
- * Club domestic league appearances and goals as of 03:10, 15 September 2021 (UTC) ‡ National team caps and goals as of 17:12, 21 July 2024 (UTC)

Oluwapelumi Emmanuel Adeyemo (born 21 May 2002) is a Nigerian professional footballer who plays as a midfielder for the club Vizela in the Primeira Liga.

== Professional career ==
A youth product of the Nigerian academy Triple 44, Adeyemo signed a four-year contract with the Portuguese club Vizela on 22 January 2021. He shortly after went on loan with Pedras Salgadas for the rest of the 2020–21 season. He made his professional debut with Vizela in a 2–1 Taça da Liga loss to Estrela on 24 July 2021.

== International career ==
In October 2022, Adeyemo was called up to the Nigeria U23s for a set of 2023 U-23 Africa Cup of Nations qualification matches.
