= David Haro =

Spanish footballer

Personal information
- Full name: David Haro Iniesta
- Date of birth: 17 July 1990 (age 36)
- Place of birth: L'Ametlla del Vallès, Spain
- Height: 1.65 m (5 ft 5 in)
- Positions: Winger; forward

Youth career
- 2000–2006: Ametlla Vallès
- 2006–2007: Granollers
- 2007–2008: Ametlla Vallès
- 2008–2009: Europa

Senior career*
Years	Team	Apps	(Gls)
2009–2010	Sants	31	(16)
2010–2011	Prat	35	(11)
2011–2012	Hospitalet	29	(5)
2012–2013	Gimnàstic	35	(4)
2013–2015	Hospitalet	78	(27)
2015–2018	Reus	84	(12)
2018–2019	Sundsvall	22	(3)
2019–2021	Atlético Baleares	53	(7)
2021–2022	Costa Brava	6	(0)
2022	Inter Turku	12	(4)
- * Club domestic league appearances and goals as of 16 October 2022

David Haro Iniesta (born 17 July 1990) is a Spanish footballer who plays as a right winger or a forward.

== Club career ==
Born in L'Ametlla del Vallès, Barcelona, Catalonia, Haro represented CF Ametlla del Vallès, EC Granollers and CE Europa as a youth. In 2009, he joined UE Sants in the Primera Catalana, making his senior debut for the club during the campaign and scoring a career-best 16 goals.

In July 2010, Haro joined Tercera División side AE Prat. On 2 June of the following year, after being a key unit for the club, he signed for CE L'Hospitalet in Segunda División B.

On 26 June 2012, Haro signed a one-year contract with Gimnàstic de Tarragona, freshly relegated to the third level. After being mainly used as a substitute, he returned to Hospi on 10 July 2013.

On 4 July 2015, Haro agreed to a two-year deal with CF Reus Deportiu, still in the third division. He scored ten goals for the club during the campaign (including two in the play-off finals against Racing de Santander), as his side achieved promotion to Segunda División for the first time ever.

Haro made his professional debut on 6 November 2016, replacing Jorge Miramón in a 0–1 home loss against Levante UD. The following 17 January, he renewed his contract with the club.

On 13 July 2018, free agent Haro moved abroad for the first time in his career, joining Allsvenskan side GIF Sundsvall. On 3 July of the following year, he returned to his home country after agreeing to a deal with CD Atlético Baleares in division three.

On 14 February 2022, Haro signed with Inter Turku in Finland for the 2022 season.
