= Anderson (footballer, born 1995) =

Brazilian footballer (born 1995)

Personal information
- Full name: Anderson de Jesus Santos
- Date of birth: 2 March 1995 (age 31)
- Place of birth: Lagarto, Brazil
- Height: 1.85 m (6 ft 1 in)
- Position: Centre back

Team information
- Current team: Vila Nova
- Number: 14

Youth career
- Confiança

Senior career*
Years	Team	Apps	(Gls)
2014–2015	Confiança	6	(0)
2016	Guarani-MG	3	(0)
2017–2018	Confiança	39	(1)
2018–2019	Grêmio	1	(0)
2018–2019	→ Guarani (loan)	3	(0)
2019	→ Confiança (loan)	29	(3)
2020	Bahia	6	(1)
2020–2021	América Mineiro	62	(4)
2022–2024	Vizela	76	(3)
2024	Bolívar	11	(0)
2025	CRB	1	(0)
2025	Avaí	5	(0)
2026–	Vila Nova	7	(0)
- * Club domestic league appearances and goals as of 17 December 2025

Anderson de Jesus Santos (born 2 March 1995), simply known as Anderson, is a Brazilian footballer who plays as a central defender for Vila Nova.

== Personal life ==
Anderson's older brother Valdo is also a footballer and a centre back. He also came through the youth system at Confiança.

== Honours ==
Confiança

- Campeonato Sergipano: 2015, 2017
