= Dan Biton =

Israeli general

- דן ביטון
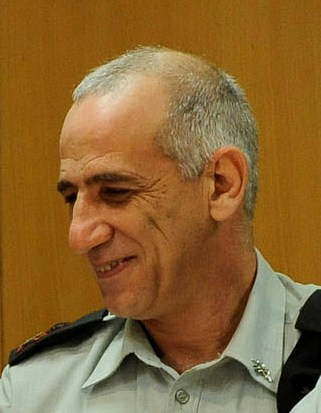
- Dan Biton
- Born: 1961 (age 64–65)
- Military career
- Allegiance: Israel
- Branch: Israel Defense Forces
- Service years: 1979–present
- Rank: Aluf
- Units: Kfir Brigade, 460th Brigade, 500th Brigade, 36th Division
- Commands: Technological and Logistics Directorate

Aluf Dan Biton (Hebrew: דן ביטון; born 1961) is a general in the Israel Defense Forces and the Head of the Technological and Logistics Directorate.

Biton was drafted into the IDF in 1979. He served with the armored corps and later became a company commander in the Kfir Brigade and the 460th Brigade. He continued his service in the latter, becoming battalion vice commander and GHQ officer. Biton served as commander of a battalion within the 500th Brigade, was made a GHQ officer in the 36th Division and various other officer posts. Biton was appointed Head of the Land Training Center and the Sinai division, later promoted to head the Doctrine and Guidance Brigade in the General Staff.

Promoted to the rank of Aluf in 2007, he is Head of the Technological and Logistics Directorate.

Biton is a graduate of the IDF's Command and Headquarters School and the National Security College. He holds a Bachelor's Degree in History from Tel Aviv University and a Master's Degree in Political Science from the University of Haifa. He is a father of four.
