= Kiki Afonso =

Portuguese footballer (born 1994)

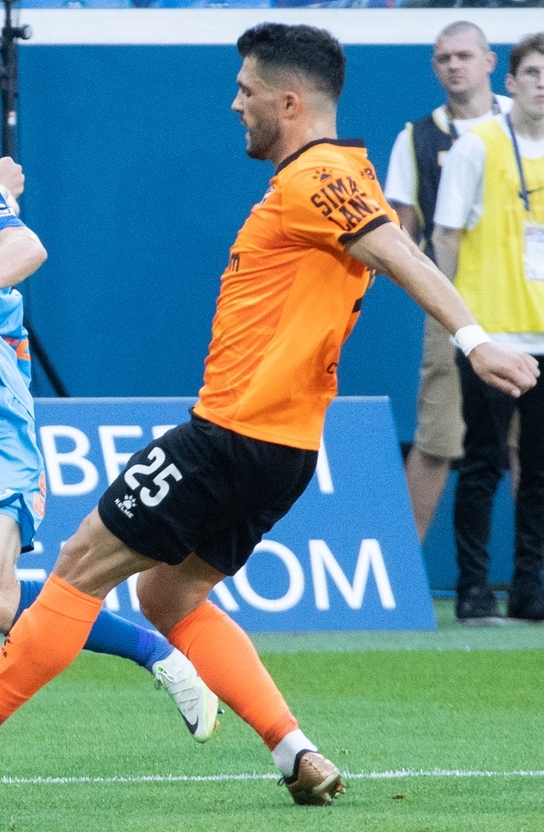

Personal information
- Full name: Christian Neiva Afonso
- Date of birth: 10 December 1994 (age 31)
- Place of birth: Vila Chã, Portugal
- Height: 1.81 m (5 ft 11 in)
- Position: Left-back

Youth career
- 2005–2008: Marinhas
- 2008–2011: Porto
- 2009–2010: → Padroense (loan)
- 2011–2013: Rio Ave

Senior career*
Years	Team	Apps	(Gls)
2013	Rio Ave	1	(0)
2013	Dagenham & Redbridge	0	(0)
2014–2015	Atlético	46	(1)
2015–2016	Gil Vicente	15	(0)
2016–2017	Olhanense	28	(0)
2017–2019	Feirense	2	(0)
2018–2019	→ Felgueiras 1932 (loan)	14	(1)
2019	B-SAD	4	(0)
2019–2023	Vizela	90	(3)
2023–2024	Ural	13	(0)
2024–2026	AVS	53	(1)

International career
2014	Portugal U20	1	(0)
- * Club domestic league appearances and goals as of 25 May 2026

Christian "Kiki" Neiva Afonso (born 10 December 1994) is a Portuguese professional footballer who plays as a left-back.

== Club career ==
=== Early career ===
Born in the Vila Chã municipality of Esposende, Afonso finished his development at Rio Ave FC. He made his senior debut on 11 May 2013, coming on as a last-minute substitute in a 2–1 home win against Gil Vicente F.C. in the Primeira Liga.

=== Journeyman ===
Afonso went back to Portugal following a brief spell in England with Dagenham & Redbridge, going on spend four seasons in the Segunda Liga with Atlético Clube de Portugal, Gil Vicente and S.C. Olhanense. He scored his first goal as a professional on 18 January 2015, helping the first of those teams to defeat the last 3–2.

Afonso returned to the top division in the summer of 2017, but totalled just six league appearances over two seasons for C.D. Feirense and B-SAD. The former club also loaned him to third-tier side F.C. Felgueiras 1932.

=== Vizela ===
On 14 August 2019, Afonso signed with F.C. Vizela. He was part of the squads that earned two promotions in as many years to return to the top tier, contributing 32 matches (33 in all competitions) and two goals in the 2020–21 campaign.

Afonso scored his first goal in the Portuguese top flight on 17 February 2023, closing the 1–1 draw at Gil Vicente.

=== Later career ===
On 21 June 2023, Afonso joined Russian Premier League club FC Ural Yekaterinburg as a free agent. He returned to Portugal and its main division one year later, signing for newly promoted AVS Futebol SAD.

== International career ==
Afonso was part of the Portugal under-20 squad at the 2014 Toulon Tournament, playing the entire 4–1 victory over China in the group stage in an eventual third-place finish.

== Career statistics ==
As of match played 1 June 2024

Appearances and goals by club, season and competition
Club	Season	League			National cup (Note: Includes Taça de Portugal, Russian Cup)		League Cup		Other		Total	
Club	Season	Division	Apps	Goals	Apps	Goals	Apps	Goals	Apps	Goals	Apps	Goals
Rio Ave	2012–13	Primeira Liga	1	0	0	0	0	0	—		1	0
Atlético	2013–14	Liga Portugal 2	8	0	0	0	0	0	—		8	0
Atlético	2014–15	Liga Portugal 2	38	1	2	0	5	0	—		45	1
Atlético	Total		46	1	2	0	5	0	0	0	53	1
Gil Vicente	2015–16	Liga Portugal 2	15	0	4	0	—		—		19	0
Olhanense	2016–17	Liga Portugal 2	28	0	1	0	—		—		29	0
Feirense	2017–18	Primeira Liga	2	0	1	0	0	0	—		3	0
Felgueiras 1932 (loan)	2018–19	Campeonato de Portugal	14	1	0	0	—		—		14	1
B-SAD	2018–19	Primeira Liga	4	0	0	0	0	0	0	0	4	0
Vizela	2019–20	Campeonato de Portugal	5	0	1	0	0	0	—		6	0
Vizela	2020–21	Liga Portugal 2	32	2	1	0	0	0	—		33	2
Vizela	2021–22	Primeira Liga	25	0	3	0	1	0	—		29	0
Vizela	2022–23	Primeira Liga	28	1	2	0	2	0	—		32	1
Vizela	Total		90	3	7	0	3	0	0	0	100	3
Ural	2023–24	Russian Premier League	13	0	7	0	—		0	0	20	0
Career total			213	5	22	0	8	0	0	0	243	5
