= Emmanuel Maviram =

Nigerian footballer

Personal information
- Full name: Nor-Nor Emmanuel Maviram
- Date of birth: 4 April 2001 (age 25)
- Place of birth: Jos, Nigeria
- Height: 1.68 m (5 ft 6 in)
- Position: Left-back

Team information
- Current team: Riga
- Number: 28

Youth career
- 2018–2019: Gee-Lec Academy
- 2019–2020: Porto

Senior career*
Years	Team	Apps	(Gls)
2020–2021	Pedras Salgadas	19	(0)
2021–2023	Vizela	2	(0)
2021	→ Pedras Salgadas (loan)	2	(0)
2022–2023	→ Länk Vilaverdense (loan)	11	(2)
2023–2024	Länk Vilaverdense	28	(1)
2024–2026	Tondela	52	(2)
2026–	Riga	2	(0)
- * Club domestic league appearances and goals as of 12 November 2026

Nor-Nor Emmanuel Maviram (born 4 April 2001) is a Nigerian professional footballer who plays as a left-back for Latvian Higher League club Riga.

== Professional career ==
A youth product of Gee-Lec Academy and Porto, Maviram began his senior career with Pedras Salgadas on 2 September 2020. He transferred to Vizela on 2 February 2021, signing a contract until 2024. He made his professional debut with Vizela in a 4–0 Segunda Liga win over Leixões on 29 March 2021. In August 2026, Maviram joined Latvian club Riga FC from Portuguese side Tondela.
