= Migue García =

Spanish footballer

Personal information
- Full name: Miguel Alberto García Díaz
- Date of birth: 17 April 1991 (age 35)
- Place of birth: Huelma, Spain
- Height: 1.70 m (5 ft 7 in)
- Positions: Left back; winger

Youth career
- 2008–2010: Granada 74

Senior career*
Years	Team	Apps	(Gls)
2010–2011	La Zubia	24	(11)
2011–2015	Granada B	56	(11)
2013	→ Huesca (loan)	11	(0)
2014–2015	→ Cádiz (loan)	53	(6)
2015–2016	Racing Santander	39	(4)
2016–2018	Reus	18	(0)
2018–2019	UCAM Murcia	32	(1)
2020–2021	Granada B	31	(5)
2021–2022	Toledo	31	(8)
2022–2024	Melilla	23	(0)
2024–2025	Jaén	57	(9)
- * Club domestic league appearances and goals as of 22 June 2025

Miguel 'Migue' Alberto García Díaz (born 17 April 1991) is a Spanish footballer who plays as a left back or a winger.

== Football career ==
García was born in Huelma, Jaén, Andalusia. A product of local Granada 74 CF's youth system, he began his senior career in amateur football with Atlético La Zubia. In the summer of 2011 he signed a contract with Granada CF, going on to play almost two full seasons for the reserves; on 13 May 2012, he appeared on the bench for the first team against Rayo Vallecano.

García renewed his contract with the Andalusians on 20 January 2013, extending his link with the club until 2015. Eight days later, he again was an unused substitute in a La Liga game, this time against Sevilla FC.

On 31 January 2013, García was loaned to SD Huesca until the end of the campaign. He made his Segunda División debut on 24 February, playing 11 minutes in a 1–3 away loss to Elche CF.

García returned to Granada in the 2013 off-season, being again assigned to the B-side in Segunda División B. On 16 January 2014 he was loaned to Cádiz CF of the same division, with the deal being renewed for a further season on 5 August.

On 31 August 2015, García signed a one-year deal with Racing de Santander also in the third level. On 8 July of the following year he moved to CF Reus Deportiu who had just promoted to the second tier, after agreeing to a two-year contract.

On 27 July 2018, García was announced at UCAM Murcia.

On 8 July 2021, García was announced at CD Toledo.
