= Manuel Baldé =

Bissau-Guinean footballer

Personal information
- Full name: Manuel Mama Samba Baldé
- Date of birth: 14 November 2002 (age 23)
- Place of birth: Albufeira, Portugal
- Height: 1.94 m (6 ft 4 in)
- Position: Goalkeeper

Team information
- Current team: Trofense
- Number: 31

Youth career
- 2010–2014: Imortal
- 2014–2019: Benfica
- 2019–2020: Aves

Senior career*
Years	Team	Apps	(Gls)
2020–2023	Vizela	0	(0)
2023–2026	Penafiel	36	(0)
2026–	Trofense	5	(0)

International career^{‡}
2022–	Guinea-Bissau	17	(0)
- * Club domestic league appearances and goals as of 18 June 2026 ‡ National team caps and goals as of 18 June 2026

Manuel Mama Samba Baldé (born 14 November 2002) is a professional footballer who plays as a goalkeeper for Liga 3 club Trofense. Born in Portugal, he plays for the Guinea-Bissau national team.

== Club career ==
Baldé is a youth product of the academies of Imortal, Benfica, and Aves. He signed a professional contract with Vizela in 2020, and extended his contract on 19 July 2021, after they achieved promotion to the Primeira Liga.

On 3 July 2023, Baldé terminated his contract with Vizela and signed a three-year deal with Liga Portugal 2 club Penafiel.

== International career ==
Born in Portugal, Baldé is of Bissau-Guinean descent. He was called up to represent the Guinea-Bissau national team at the 2021 Africa Cup of Nations. He debuted with Guinea-Bissau in a friendly 3–0 win over Equatorial Guinea on 23 March 2022.
