= Kiko Bondoso =

Portuguese footballer

Personal information
- Full name: Francisco Miguel Ribeiro Tomé Tavares Bondoso
- Date of birth: 17 November 1995 (age 30)
- Place of birth: Moimenta da Beira, Portugal
- Height: 1.69 m (5 ft 7 in)
- Position: Winger

Team information
- Current team: Moreirense
- Number: 10

Youth career
- 2007–2012: Moimenta da Beira
- 2012–2013: Académico Viseu
- 2013–2014: Moimenta da Beira

Senior career*
Years	Team	Apps	(Gls)
2013–2017	Moimenta da Beira	114	(19)
2017–2018	Ferreira de Aves	30	(9)
2018–2019	Lusitano Vildemoinhos	33	(7)
2019–2023	Vizela	125	(22)
2023–2025	Maccabi Tel Aviv	13	(1)
2024–2025	→ Rio Ave (loan)	28	(2)
2025–	Moreirense	39	(0)
- * Club domestic league appearances and goals as of 14:53, 31 October 2026 (UTC)

Francisco "Kiko" Miguel Ribeiro Tomé Tavares Bondoso (born 17 November 1995) is a Portuguese professional footballer who plays as a winger for Primeira Liga club Moreirense.

== Club career ==
Bondoso was born in Moimenta da Beira, Viseu District. He spent his first seven seasons as a senior in the third division or lower.

Bondoso signed with F.C. Vizela of the third tier in the summer of 2019, from Lusitano FCV. He was part of the squads that earned two promotions in as many seasons to reach the Primeira Liga, scoring three goals in 29 Liga Portugal 2 matches in the second and subsequently renewing his contract until 30 June 2024.

On 6 August 2021, Bondoso made his debut in the Portuguese top flight, starting in a 3–0 away loss against Sporting CP. He scored his first goal the following weekend, helping the hosts come from behind to defeat C.D. Tondela 2–1.

On 2 September 2023, Israeli Premier League club Maccabi Tel Aviv F.C. announced the signing of Bondoso on a three-year contract with an option for a further year, for a fee reportedly close to €1 million. He scored his only goal on 3 January 2024, in the 4–1 away win over F.C. Ashdod; his team were ultimately crowned champions.

Bondoso went back to Portugal in July 2024, on a season-long loan at Rio Ave FC. He remained in the country's top tier for 2025–26, joining Moreirense F.C. on a two-year deal.

== Honours ==
Maccabi Tel Aviv

- Israeli Premier League: 2023–24
- Toto Cup: 2023–24
