= Manchester City W.F.C. in international football =

Football club in Manchester

Manchester City W.F.C. in European football
- Club: Manchester City
- Most appearances: Jill Scott; Keira Walsh (both 14)
- Top scorer: Izzy Christiansen; Nikita Parris; Jane Ross (all 4)
- First entry: 2016–17 UEFA Women's Champions League
- Latest entry: 2024-25 UEFA Women's Champions League

Manchester City Women's Football Club is an English football club based in Manchester. The club was founded in 1988 and has competed in the UEFA Women's Champions League every season since 2016–17.

== History ==
The club's first entry into European competition came in 2016, when – as runners-up in the 2015 FA WSL – they were given direct entry to the knockout stages of the 2016–17 UEFA Women's Champions League. Given several easier draws, City managed to progress to the semi-finals, where they met the holders Lyon. Despite a creditable win in the away leg thanks to a goal from FIFA World Player of the Year Carli Lloyd they were beaten over two legs and went out at that stage. History would repeat itself the following season, when Lyon again knocked City out at the semi-final stage once again, though with only a single goal across both legs dividing the two teams. In both cases, Lyon went on to win the competition.

Their third season in Europe – 2018–19 – saw City instantly facing tough opposition in Atlético Madrid, who had won their national league the previous two seasons. City were unable to overcome the challenge, drawing away before losing at home to exit the competition in the Round of 32.

== UEFA competitions ==
Manchester City results in UEFA competition
Season	Competition	Qualification method	Round	Opposition	Home	Away	Neutral
2016–17	Champions League	WSL, Runners-Up	Round of 32	(Russia) Zvezda Perm	2–0	4–0	—
2016–17	Champions League	WSL, Runners-Up	Round of 16	(Denmark) Brøndby	1–0	1–1	—
2016–17	Champions League	WSL, Runners-Up	Quarter-finals	(Denmark) Fortuna Hjørring	1–0	1–0	—
2016–17	Champions League	WSL, Runners-Up	Semi-finals	(France) Lyon	1–3	1–0	—
2017–18	Champions League	WSL, Champions	Round of 32	(Austria) St. Pölten	3–0	3–0	—
2017–18	Champions League	WSL, Champions	Round of 16	(Norway) Lillestrøm	5–0	2–1	—
2017–18	Champions League	WSL, Champions	Quarter-finals	(Sweden) Linköping	2–0	5–3	—
2017–18	Champions League	WSL, Champions	Semi-finals	(France) Lyon	0–0	0–1	—
2018–19	Champions League	WSL, Runners-Up	Round of 32	(Spain) Atlético Madrid	0–2	1–1	—
2019–20	Champions League	WSL, Runners-Up	Round of 32	(Switzerland) FF Lugano 1976	4–0	7–1	—
2019–20	Champions League	WSL, Runners-Up	Round of 32	(Spain) Atlético Madrid	1–1	1–2	—
2020–21	Champions League	WSL, Runners-Up	Round of 32	(Sweden) Kopparbergs/Göteborg FC	3–0	2–1	—
2020–21	Champions League	WSL, Runners-Up	Round of 16	(Italy) Fiorentina	3–0	5–0	—
2020–21	Champions League	WSL, Runners-Up	Quarter-finals	(Spain) Barcelona	2–1	0–3	—
2021–22	Champions League	WSL, Runners-Up	Second Qualifying Round	(Spain) Real Madrid	0–1	1–1	—
2022–23	Champions League	WSL, Third	First Qualifying Round, Semi-final	(Kazakhstan) Tomiris-Turan	—	—	6–0
2022–23	Champions League	WSL, Third	First Qualifying Round, Final	(Spain) Real Madrid	—	0–1	—
2024–25	Champions League	WSL, Runners-Up	Second Qualifying Round	(France) Paris FC	3–0	5–0	—
2024–25	Champions League	WSL, Runners-Up	Group Stage	(Spain) Barcelona	—	—	—
2024–25	Champions League	WSL, Runners-Up	Group Stage	(Austria) St. Pölten	—	—	—
2024–25	Champions League	WSL, Runners-Up	Group Stage	(Sweden) Hammarby	—	—	—

== Overall record ==
As of 28 September 2024

Competition	Pld	W	D	L	GF	GA	GD	Win%
UEFA Champions League	34	22	5	7	76	24	+52	64.71

=== By country ===
Result summary by country
Country	Pld	W	D	L	GF	GA	GD	Win%
Austria	2	2	0	0	6	0	+6	100.00
Denmark	4	3	1	0	4	1	+3	75.00
France	6	3	1	2	10	4	+6	50.00
Italy	2	2	0	0	8	0	+8	100.00
Kazakhstan	1	1	0	0	6	0	+6	100.00
Norway	2	2	0	0	7	1	+6	100.00
Russia	2	2	0	0	6	0	+6	100.00
Spain	9	1	3	5	6	13	−7	11.11
Sweden	4	4	0	0	12	4	+8	100.00
Switzerland	2	2	0	0	11	1	+10	100.00

== See also ==
- English women's football clubs in international competitions
