= List of UEFA Women's Cup and UEFA Women's Champions League records and statistics =

This page details statistics of the UEFA Women's Cup and Women's Champions League.

The UEFA Women's Cup was first played in 2001–02 and was the first international women's club football tournament for UEFA member associations. In 2009–10 it was renamed and rebranded into the Women's Champions League and allowed runner-up entries from the top eight leagues. After an expansion in 2016–17 the runners-up from the top 12 associations entered. After an expansion in 2021–22 the runners-up from the top 16 associations and the third-placed teams from the top 6 associations entered. After an expansion in 2025–26 the runners-up from the top 17 associations and the third-placed teams from the top 7 associations enter. Also, in the 2021–22 season, the competition proper included a group stage for the first time in the Women's Champions League era, which evolved into a league phase from the 2025–26 season onward.

== General performances ==
=== By club ===
Performances in the UEFA Women's Cup and UEFA Women's Champions League by club
| Club | Titles | Runners-up | Seasons won | Seasons runners-up |
|---|---|---|---|---|
| (France) OL Lyonnes | 8 | 4 | 2011, 2012, 2016, 2017, 2018, 2019, 2020, 2022 | 2010, 2013, 2024, 2026 |
| (Spain) Barcelona | 4 | 3 | 2021, 2023, 2024, 2026 | 2019, 2022, 2025 |
| (Germany) Eintracht Frankfurt | 4 | 2 | 2002, 2006, 2008, 2015 | 2004, 2012 |
| (Germany) VfL Wolfsburg | 2 | 4 | 2013, 2014 | 2016, 2018, 2020, 2023 |
| (Sweden) Umeå | 2 | 3 | 2003, 2004 | 2002, 2007, 2008 |
| (Germany) Turbine Potsdam | 2 | 2 | 2005, 2010 | 2006, 2011 |
| (England) Arsenal | 2 | 0 | 2007, 2025 | |
| (Germany) FCR Duisburg | 1 | 0 | 2009 | |
| (France) Paris Saint-Germain | 0 | 2 | | 2015, 2017 |
| (Denmark) Fortuna Hjørring | 0 | 1 | | 2003 |
| (Sweden) Djurgården | 0 | 1 | | 2005 |
| (Russia) Zvezda Perm | 0 | 1 | | 2009 |
| (Sweden) Tyresö | 0 | 1 | | 2014 |
| (England) Chelsea | 0 | 1 | | 2021 |

=== By nation ===
| Nation | Winners | Runners-up |
|---|---|---|
| Germany | 9 | 8 |
| France | 8 | 6 |
| Spain | 4 | 3 |
| Sweden | 2 | 5 |
| England | 2 | 1 |
| Denmark | 0 | 1 |
| Russia | 0 | 1 |

=== Number of participating clubs of the Champions League era ===
==== Group/league phase (2021–present) ====
The following is a list of clubs that have played in or qualified for the Women's Champions League group stage (league phase since the 2025–26 season). Season in bold represents teams that qualified for the knockout phase. Starting from the 2025–26 season with the introduction of a league phase, the top four as well as the four play-off winners are considered to be qualified.

| Nation | No. | Clubs | Seasons |
|---|---|---|---|
| England (4) | 6 | Chelsea | 2021–22, **2022–23**, **2023–24**, **2024–25**, **2025–26**, 2026–27 |
| England (4) | 5 | Arsenal | **2021–22**, **2022–23**, **2024–25**, **2025–26**, 2026–27 |
| England (4) | 2 | Manchester City | **2024–25**, 2026–27 |
| England (4) | 1 | Manchester United | **2025–26** |
| Germany (4) | 6 | Bayern Munich | **2021–22**, **2022–23**, 2023–24, **2024–25**, **2025–26**, 2026–27 |
| Germany (4) | 4 | VfL Wolfsburg | **2021–22**, **2022–23**, **2024–25**, **2025–26** |
| Germany (4) | 1 | TSG Hoffenheim | 2021–22 |
| Germany (4) | 1 | Eintracht Frankfurt | 2023–24 |
| France (3) | 6 | OL Lyonnes | **2021–22**, **2022–23**, **2023–24**, **2024–25**, **2025–26**, 2026–27 |
| France (3) | 5 | Paris Saint-Germain | **2021–22**, **2022–23**, **2023–24**, 2025–26, 2026–27 |
| France (3) | 3 | Paris FC | 2023–24, 2025–26, 2026–27 |
| Spain (3) | 6 | Barcelona | **2021–22**, **2022–23**, **2023–24**, **2024–25**, **2025–26**, 2026–27 |
| Spain (3) | 6 | Real Madrid | **2021–22**, 2022–23, 2023–24, **2024–25**, **2025–26**, 2026–27 |
| Spain (3) | 1 | Atlético Madrid | 2025–26 |
| Italy (3) | 5 | Juventus | **2021–22**, 2022–23, 2024–25, 2025–26, 2026–27 |
| Italy (3) | 5 | Roma | **2022–23**, 2023–24, 2024–25, 2025–26, 2026–27 |
| Italy (3) | 1 | Inter Milan | 2026–27 |
| Sweden (3) | 3 | BK Häcken | 2021–22, **2023–24**, 2026–27 |
| Sweden (3) | 2 | FC Rosengård | 2022–23, 2023–24 |
| Sweden (3) | 1 | Hammarby IF | 2024–25 |
| Austria (2) | 4 | St. Pölten | 2022–23, 2023–24, 2024–25, 2025–26 |
| Austria (2) | 1 | Austria Wien | 2026–27 |
| Netherlands (2) | 2 | Twente | 2024–25, 2025–26 |
| Netherlands (2) | 1 | Ajax | **2023–24** |
| Norway (2) | 2 | Vålerenga | 2024–25, 2025–26 |
| Norway (2) | 1 | Brann | **2023–24** |
| Switzerland (2) | 2 | Servette | 2021–22, 2026–27 |
| Switzerland (2) | 1 | Zürich | 2022–23 |
| Portugal (1) | 5 | Benfica | 2021–22, 2022–23, **2023–24**, 2025–26, 2026–27 |
| Czech Republic (1) | 2 | Slavia Prague | 2022–23, 2023–24 |
| Denmark (1) | 2 | HB Køge | 2021–22, 2026–27 |
| Belgium (1) | 2 | OH Leuven | 2025–26, 2026–27 |
| Iceland (1) | 1 | Breiðablik | 2021–22 |
| Ukraine (1) | 1 | Zhytlobud-1 Kharkiv | 2021–22 |
| Albania (1) | 1 | Vllaznia | 2022–23 |
| Scotland (1) | 1 | Celtic | 2024–25 |
| Turkey (1) | 1 | Galatasaray | 2024–25 |

Team in Italic: team no longer active. (If a successor team has also qualified, total appearances are grouped together.)

==== Round of 32 (2009–2021) ====
A total of 108 clubs from 38 national associations played in the Champions League round of 32. Season in bold represents teams that qualified for the round of 16.

| Nation | No. | Clubs | Seasons |
|---|---|---|---|
| Sweden (8) | 9 | Malmö Rosengård | **2011–12**, **2012–13**, **2013–14**, **2014–15**, **2015–16**, **2016–17**, **2017–18**, **2018–19**; **2020–21** |
| Sweden (8) | 5 | Linköping | **2009–10**, **2010–11**, **2014–15**, **2017–18**, **2018–19** |
| Sweden (8) | 4 | Göteborg | **2011–12**, **2012–13**, 2019–20, 2020–21 |
| Sweden (8) | 1 | Umeå | **2009–10** |
| Sweden (8) | 1 | Tyresö | **2013–14** |
| Sweden (8) | 1 | Örebro | **2015–16** |
| Sweden (8) | 1 | Eskilstuna | **2016–17** |
| Sweden (8) | 1 | Piteå | 2019–20 |
| England (7) | 6 | Arsenal | **2009–10**, **2010–11**, **2011–12**, **2012–13**, **2013–14**, **2019–20** |
| England (7) | 5 | Chelsea | **2015–16**, **2016–17**, **2017–18**, **2018–19**, **2020–21** |
| England (7) | 5 | Manchester City | **2016–17**, **2017–18**, 2018–19, **2019–20**, **2020–21** |
| England (7) | 2 | Everton | 2009–10, **2010–11** |
| England (7) | 2 | Birmingham | 2012–13, **2013–14** |
| England (7) | 2 | Bristol | 2011–12, **2014–15** |
| England (7) | 2 | Liverpool | 2014–15, **2015–16** |
| Italy (6) | 6 | Torres | **2009–10**, **2010–11**, **2011–12**, **2012–13**, **2013–14**, **2014–15** |
| Italy (6) | 5 | Bardolino AGSM Verona | 2009–10, **2010–11**, **2012–13**, **2015–16**, 2016–17 |
| Italy (6) | 4 | Brescia | 2014–15, **2015–16**, **2016–17**, **2017–18** |
| Italy (6) | 4 | Fiorentina | **2017–18**, **2018–19**, 2019–20, **2020–21** |
| Italy (6) | 3 | Juventus | 2018–19, 2019–20, 2020–21 |
| Italy (6) | 2 | Tavagnacco | 2011–12, 2013–14 |
| Russia (6) | 7 | Rossiyanka | **2009–10**, **2010–11**, **2011–12**, **2012–13**, **2013–14**, **2016–17**, 2017–18 |
| Russia (6) | 7 | Zvezda Perm | **2009–10**, **2010–11**, **2014–15**, **2015–16**, 2016–17, 2017–18, 2018–19 |
| Russia (6) | 3 | Krasnogorsk | **2012–13**, **2013–14**, 2015–16 |
| Russia (6) | 3 | Ryazan-VDV | 2014–15, 2018–19, 2019–20 |
| Russia (6) | 1 | Voronezh | **2011–12** |
| Russia (6) | 1 | Chertanovo | 2019–20 |
| Germany (5) | 9 | Wolfsburg | **2012–13**, **2013–14**, **2014–15**, **2015–16**, **2016–17**, **2017–18**, **2018–19**, **2019–20**, **2020–21** |
| Germany (5) | 7 | Bayern Munich | **2009–10**, 2015–16, **2016–17**, 2017–18, **2018–19**, **2019–20**, **2020–21** |
| Germany (5) | 5 | Turbine Potsdam | **2009–10**, **2010–11**, **2011–12**, **2012–13**, **2013–14** |
| Germany (5) | 3 | Frankfurt | **2011–12**, **2014–15**, **2015–16** |
| Germany (5) | 2 | Duisburg | **2009–10**, **2010–11** |
| Norway (5) | 6 | LSK Kvinner | 2013–14, **2015–16**, 2016–17, **2017–18**, **2018–19**, **2020–21** |
| Norway (5) | 3 | Røa | **2009–10**, **2010–11**, **2012–13** |
| Norway (5) | 3 | Stabæk | 2011–12, **2012–13**, 2014–15 |
| Norway (5) | 3 | Avaldsnes | 2016–17, 2017–18, 2018–19 |
| Norway (5) | 1 | Vålerenga | 2020–21 |
| Netherlands (5) | 6 | Twente | 2011–12, 2013–14, 2014–15, **2015–16**, **2016–17**, **2019–20** |
| Netherlands (5) | 3 | Ajax | 2017–18, **2018–19**, 2020–21 |
| Netherlands (5) | 2 | AZ Alkmaar | 2009–10, 2010–11 |
| Netherlands (5) | 1 | ADO Den Haag | 2012–13 |
| Netherlands (5) | 1 | PSV | 2020–21 |
| France (4) | 12 | OL Lyonnes | **2009–10**, **2010–11**, **2011–12**, **2012–13**, **2013–14**, **2014–15**, **2015–16**, **2016–17**, **2017–18**, **2018–19**, **2019–20**, **2020–21** |
| France (4) | 8 | PSG | **2011–12**, 2013–14, **2014–15**, **2015–16**, **2016–17**, **2018–19**, **2019–20**, **2020–21** |
| France (4) | 2 | Juvisy | **2010–11**, **2012–13** |
| France (4) | 2 | Montpellier | **2009–10**, **2017–18** |
| Spain (4) | 9 | Barcelona | 2012–13, **2013–14**, **2014–15**, **2015–16**, **2016–17**, **2017–18**, **2018–19**, **2019–20**, **2020–21** |
| Spain (4) | 5 | Atlético Madrid | **2015–16**, 2017–18, **2018–19**, **2019–20**, **2020–21** |
| Spain (4) | 3 | Rayo Vallecano | 2009–10, **2010–11**, **2011–12** |
| Spain (4) | 1 | Athletic Bilbao | 2016–17 |
| Switzerland (4) | 11 | Zürich | 2009–10, 2010–11, 2012–13, **2013–14**, **2014–15**, 2015–16, **2016–17**, 2017–18, **2018–19**, 2019–20, 2020–21 |
| Switzerland (4) | 1 | YB Frauen | 2011–12 |
| Switzerland (4) | 1 | Lugano | 2019–20 |
| Switzerland (4) | 1 | Servette Chênois | 2020–21 |
| Iceland (4) | 4 | Stjarnan | 2012–13, 2014–15, 2015–16, **2017–18** |
| Iceland (4) | 3 | Valur | 2009–10, 2010–11, 2011–12 |
| Iceland (4) | 3 | Þór/KA | 2011–12, 2013–14, 2018–19 |
| Iceland (4) | 3 | Breiðablik | 2010–11, 2016–17, **2019–20** |
| Belarus (4) | 5 | Minsk | 2015–16, 2016–17, 2017–18, **2019–20**, 2020–21 |
| Belarus (4) | 1 | Universitet Vitebsk | 2009–10 |
| Belarus (4) | 1 | Zorka-BDU Minsk | 2010–11 |
| Belarus (4) | 1 | Bobruichanka Bobruisk | 2011–12 |
| Austria (3) | 7 | Spratzern St. Pölten | 2013–14, 2015–16, 2016–17, 2017–18, 2018–19, 2019–20, **2020–21** |
| Austria (3) | 6 | SV Neulengbach | **2009–10**, **2010–11**, **2011–12**, 2012–13, **2013–14**, **2014–15** |
| Austria (3) | 1 | SK Sturm Graz | 2016–17 |
| Poland (3) | 4 | RTP Unia Racibórz | 2009–10, 2010–11, 2012–13, 2013–14 |
| Poland (3) | 4 | Medyk Konin | 2014–15, 2015–16, 2016–17, 2017–18 |
| Poland (3) | 1 | Górnik Łęczna | 2020–21 |
| Belgium (3) | 5 | Standard Liège | 2009–10, 2011–12, 2012–13, 2013–14, 2015–16 |
| Belgium (3) | 1 | Sint-Truidense | 2010–11 |
| Belgium (3) | 1 | Anderlecht | 2019–20 |
| Finland (3) | 4 | PK-35 Vantaa | 2011–12, 2012–13, 2013–14, 2015–16 |
| Finland (3) | 2 | Honka | 2009–10, 2018–19 |
| Finland (3) | 1 | Åland | 2010–11 |
| Ukraine (3) | 2 | Zhytlobud-1 Kharkiv | 2009–10, 2018–19 |
| Ukraine (3) | 1 | Lehenda Chernihiv | 2010–11 |
| Ukraine (3) | 1 | Zhytlobud-2 Kharkiv | 2020–21 |
| Portugal (3) | 1 | Atlético Ouriense | 2014–15 |
| Portugal (3) | 1 | Braga | 2019–20 |
| Portugal (3) | 1 | Benfica | 2020–21 |
| Denmark (2) | 12 | Fortuna Hjørring | **2009–10**, **2010–11**, **2011–12**, **2012–13**, **2013–14**, **2014–15**, **2015–16**, **2016–17**, 2017–18, 2018–19, **2019–20**, **2020–21** |
| Denmark (2) | 12 | Brøndby | **2009–10**, **2010–11**, **2011–12**, 2012–13, 2013–14, **2014–15**, 2015–16, **2016–17**, 2017–18, **2018–19**, **2019–20**, **2020–21** |
| Czech Republic (2) | 11 | Sparta Praha | **2009–10**, **2010–11**, **2011–12**, **2012–13**, 2013–14, 2014–15, 2016–17, **2017–18**, 2018–19, 2019–20, **2020–21** |
| Czech Republic (2) | 7 | Slavia Praha | 2014–15, **2015–16**, **2016–17**, **2017–18**, **2018–19**, **2019–20**, 2020–21 |
| Scotland (2) | 10 | Glasgow | 2011–12, 2012–13, **2013–14**, **2014–15**, 2015–16, 2016–17, 2017–18, **2018–19**, **2019–20**, 2020–21 |
| Scotland (2) | 2 | Hibernian | 2016–17, 2019–20 |
| Kazakhstan (2) | 9 | BIIK Kazygurt | 2009–10, 2012–13, 2014–15, 2015–16, **2016–17**, **2017–18**, 2018–19, **2019–20**, **2020–21** |
| Kazakhstan (2) | 3 | CSHVSM | 2010–11, 2011–12, 2013–14 |
| Cyprus (2) | 7 | Apollon Limassol | 2010–11, 2011–12, 2012–13, 2013–14, 2014–15, 2016–17, 2017–18 |
| Cyprus (2) | 1 | Barcelona FA | 2018–19 |
| Serbia (2) | 6 | Spartak Subotica | 2012–13, 2013–14, 2015–16, 2018–19, 2019–20, 2020–21 |
| Serbia (2) | 2 | Mašinac Niš | 2009–10, 2010–11 |
| Hungary (2) | 4 | Hungária | 2010–11, 2012–13, 2013–14, 2014–15 |
| Hungary (2) | 1 | Viktória | 2009–10 |
| Slovenia (2) | 2 | Pomurje | 2014–15, 2020–21 |
| Slovenia (2) | 1 | Krka | 2010–11 |
| (Republic of Ireland) Ireland (2) | 1 | Peamount United | 2011–12 |
| (Republic of Ireland) Ireland (2) | 1 | Raheny United | 2014–15 |
| Greece (1) | 4 | PAOK | 2009–10, 2010–11, 2015–16, 2017–18 |
| Romania (1) | 4 | Olimpia Cluj | 2011–12, **2012–13**, 2015–16, 2017–18 |
| (Bosnia and Herzegovina) Bosnia & Herzegovina (1) | 4 | SFK 2000 | 2009–10, 2012–13, 2016–17, 2018–19 |
| Lithuania (1) | 3 | Gintra Universitetas | **2014–15**, **2017–18**, 2018–19 |
| Croatia (1) | 2 | Osijek | 2011–12, 2014–15 |
| Israel (1) | 1 | Tel Aviv | 2011–12 |
| Estonia (1) | 1 | Pärnu | 2013–14 |
| Turkey (1) | 1 | Konak Belediyespor | **2013–14** |
| Albania (1) | 1 | Vllaznia | 2019–20 |
| Kosovo (1) | 1 | Mitrovica | 2019–20 |
| (Georgia (country)) Georgia (1) | 1 | Lanchkhuti | 2020–21 |

Team in Italic: team no longer active. (If a successor team has also qualified, total appearances are grouped together.)

== Teams: tournament position ==
- Most titles won: 8 – (France) OL Lyonnes (2011, 2012, 2016, 2017, 2018, 2019, 2020, 2022)
- Most finishes in the top two: 12 – (France) OL Lyonnes (2010, 2011, 2012, 2013, 2016, 2017, 2018, 2019, 2020, 2022, 2024, 2026)
- Most finishes in the top four: 15 – (France) OL Lyonnes (2008, 2009, 2010, 2011, 2012, 2013, 2016, 2017, 2018, 2019, 2020, 2022, 2024, 2025, 2026)
- Most appearances: 23 – (Bosnia and Herzegovina) SFK 2000 (from 2003–04)

=== Consecutive ===
- Most consecutive championships: 5 – (France) OL Lyonnes (2016, 2017, 2018, 2019, 2020)
- Most consecutive finishes in the top two: 6 – (Spain) Barcelona (2021–present)
- Most consecutive finishes in the top four: 8 – (Spain) Barcelona (2019–present)

=== Defending the trophy ===
- A total of 25 tournaments have been played: 8 in the Women's Cup era (2001–02 to 2008–09) and 17 in the Champions League era (2009–10 to 2025–26). 8 of the 24 attempts to defend the trophy (33.33%) have been successful, split between 4 teams. These are:
  - OL Lyonnes on 5 attempts out of 8 (2011–12, 2016–17, 2017–18, 2018–19, 2019–20)
  - Umeå on 1 attempt out of 2 (2003–04)
  - Wolfsburg on 1 attempt out of 2 (2013–14)
  - Barcelona on 1 attempt out of 3 (2023–24)
- Between the two eras of this competition, this breaks down as:
  - Of the 7 attempts in Women's Cup era: 1 successful (14.3%)
  - Of the 17 attempts in the Women's Champions League era: 7 successful (41.2%)
- Three teams have managed to defend the trophy in the Champions League era:
  - OL Lyonnes (five times), who won in 2010–11, 2011–12, 2015–16, 2016–17, 2017–18, 2018–19 and 2019–20
  - Wolfsburg (once), who won in 2012–13 and 2013–14
  - Barcelona (once), who won in 2022–23 and 2023–24

=== Gaps ===
- Longest gap between successive titles: 18 years – (England) Arsenal (2007–2025)
- Longest gap between successive appearances in the top two: 18 years – (England) Arsenal (2007–2025)

=== Other ===
- Most finishes in the top four without ever being champion: 7 – (France) Paris Saint-Germain (2015, 2016, 2017, 2020, 2021, 2022, 2024)
- Most played final: 4
  - (France) OL Lyonnes vs (Germany) Wolfsburg (2013, 2016, 2018, 2020)
  - (France) OL Lyonnes vs (Spain) Barcelona (2019, 2022, 2024, 2026)

== Coaches: tournament position ==
- Most championships: 2
  - (Germany) Hans-Jürgen Tritschoks (2006 and 2008 with Frankfurt)
  - (Germany) Bernd Schröder (2005 and 2010 with Turbine Potsdam)
  - (France) Patrice Lair (2011 and 2012 with OL Lyonnes)
  - (France) Gérard Prêcheur (2016 and 2017 with OL Lyonnes)
  - (France) Reynald Pedros (2018 and 2019 with OL Lyonnes)
  - (Germany) Ralf Kellermann (2013 and 2014 with Wolfsburg)
  - (Spain) Jonatan Giráldez (2023 and 2024 with Barcelona)
- Most finishes in the top two: 4
  - (Germany) Bernd Schröder (2005, 2006, 2010 and 2011 with Turbine Potsdam)
  - (France) Patrice Lair (2011, 2012, 2013 with OL Lyonnes and 2017 with Paris Saint-Germain)

== Teams: matches played and goals scored ==
=== All time ===
- Most matches played: 162 – (France) OL Lyonnes
- Most wins: 126 – (France) OL Lyonnes
- Most goals scored: 542 – (France) OL Lyonnes

== Individual: tournament position ==
- Most championships: 8
  - (France) Sarah Bouhaddi (2011, 2012, 2016, 2017, 2018, 2019, 2020, 2022 with OL Lyonnes)
  - (France) Eugénie Le Sommer (2011, 2012, 2016, 2017, 2018, 2019, 2020, 2022 with OL Lyonnes)
  - (France) Wendie Renard (2011, 2012, 2016, 2017, 2018, 2019, 2020, 2022 with OL Lyonnes)
  - (France) Amel Majri (2011, 2012, 2016, 2017, 2018, 2019, 2020, 2022 with OL Lyonnes)
- Champion with most teams: 3 – (Germany) Conny Pohlers (2005 with Turbine Potsdam, 2008 with Frankfurt, 2013 and 2014 with Wolfsburg)
- Most final appearances: 12 – (France) Wendie Renard (2010, 2011, 2012, 2013, 2016, 2017, 2018, 2019, 2020, 2022, 2024, 2026 with OL Lyonnes)

== Appearances ==
=== All-time most appearances ===
As of 23 May 2026

Bold players still active.

| | Player | Country | App. | Years | Clubs |
|---|---|---|---|---|---|
| 1 | Wendie Renard | France | 135 | 2006– | OL Lyonnes |
| 2 | Alexandra Popp | Germany | 112 | 2008–2026 | FCR 2001 Duisburg, Wolfsburg |
| 3 | Eugénie Le Sommer | France | 102 | 2010–2025 | OL Lyonnes |
| 4 | Caroline Graham Hansen | Norway | 97 | 2010– | Stabæk, Tyresö, Wolfsburg, Barcelona |
| 5 | Saki Kumagai | Japan | 96 | 2011–2024 | Frankfurt, OL Lyonnes, Bayern Munich, Roma |
| 6 | Ramona Bachmann | Switzerland | 95 | 2007–2024 | Umeå, Rosengård, Wolfsburg, Chelsea, Paris Saint-Germain |
| 7 | Kim Little | Scotland | 93 | 2009– | Arsenal |
| 8 | Alexia Putellas | Spain | 90 | 2012– | Barcelona |
| 9 | Marta Torrejón | Spain | 89 | 2004– | Espanyol, Barcelona |
| 10 | Mariona Caldentey | Spain | 87 | 2014– | Barcelona, Arsenal |

== Goalscoring ==
=== Individual ===
- Most goals in a single match: **8** – (Serbia) Milena Nikolić, for ŽFK Spartak Subotica v Goliador-Real, 2014–15 qualifying round

==== All-time top scorers ====
As of 23 May 2026

Bold players still active.

| | Player | Country | Goals | Years | Clubs |
|---|---|---|---|---|---|
| 1 | **Ada Hegerberg** | Norway | 69 | 2012– | Stabæk, Turbine Potsdam, OL Lyonnes |
| 2 | Anja Mittag | Germany | 51 | 2004–2020 | Turbine Potsdam, Rosengård, Paris Saint-Germain, Wolfsburg |
| 3 | Eugénie Le Sommer | France | 50 | 2010–2025 | OL Lyonnes |
| 4 | **Pernille Harder** | Denmark | 49 | 2014– | Linköping, Wolfsburg, Chelsea, Bayern Munich |
| 5 | Conny Pohlers | Germany | 48 | 2004–2014 | Turbine Potsdam, Frankfurt, Wolfsburg |
| 6 | Marta | Brazil | 46 | 2004–2017 | Umeå, Tyresö, Rosengård |
| 7 | **Ewa Pajor** | Poland | 44 | 2014– | Medyk Konin, Wolfsburg, Barcelona |
| 8 | Camille Abily | France | 43 | 2004–2018 | Montpellier, OL Lyonnes |
| 8 | **Kim Little** | Scotland | 43 | 2008– | Hibernian, Arsenal |
| 10 | Lotta Schelin | Sweden | 42 | 2008–2018 | OL Lyonnes, Rosengård |

==== Most hat-tricks ====
As of 9 October 2024

Bold players still active.

| Rank | Player | Hat-tricks | Clubs |
|---|---|---|---|
| 1 | (Norway) **Ada Hegerberg** | 6 | (France) OL Lyonnes |
| 2 | (Germany) Anja Mittag | 4 | (Germany) 1. FFC Turbine Potsdam |
| 2 | (Denmark) **Pernille Harder** | 4 | (Germany) VfL Wolfsburg, (England) Chelsea, (Germany) Bayern Munich |
| 4 | (Germany) Inka Grings | 3 | (Germany) FCR 2001 Duisburg |
| 4 | (Scotland) **Kim Little** | 3 | (England) Arsenal |

==== Most goals in a single season ====
As of 23 May 2026

Includes qualifying games. Bold indicates ongoing season and active player in the season.

| Rank | Player | Club | Season | Goals |
|---|---|---|---|---|
| 1 | (Norway) Ada Hegerberg | (France) OL Lyonnes | 2017–18 | 15 |
| 2 | (Germany) Conny Pohlers | (Germany) Turbine Potsdam | 2004–05 | 14 |
| 2 | (Iceland) Margrét Lára Viðarsdóttir | (Iceland) Valur | 2008–09 | 14 |
| 2 | (Germany) Célia Šašić | (Germany) Frankfurt | 2014–15 | 14 |
| 5 | (Germany) Inka Grings | (Germany) Duisburg | 2010–11 | 13 |
| 5 | (Norway) Ada Hegerberg | (France) Olympique Lyon | 2015–16 | 13 |
| 7 | (Romania) Gabriela Enache | (Moldova) Codru Anenii Noi | 2001–02 | 12 |
| 8 | (Austria) Maria Gstöttner | (Austria) Neulengbach | 2003–04 | 11 |
| 8 | (Iceland) Margrét Lára Viðarsdóttir | (Iceland) Valur | 2005–06 | 11 |
| 8 | (Switzerland) Vanessa Bürki | (Germany) Bayern Munich | 2009–10 | 11 |
| 8 | (Bosnia and Herzegovina) Milena Nikolić | (Serbia) ŽFK Spartak | 2009–10 | 11 |
| 8 | (Romania) Laura Rus | (Cyprus) Apollon Limassol | 2009–10 | 11 |
| 8 | (Spain) Alexia Putellas | (Spain) Barcelona | 2021–22 | 11 |
| 8 | (Poland) Ewa Pajor | (Spain) Barcelona | 2025–26 | 11 |

==== In finals ====
- Fastest goal from kickoff in a final: **12 seconds** – (Brazil) Marta, for Umeå v Frankfurt, 2008
- Latest goal from kickoff in a final: **95th minute** – (Spain) Alexia Putellas, for Barcelona v OL Lyonnes, 2024

=== Team ===
- Biggest margin of victory: **21** – (Cyprus) Apollon Limassol 21–0 (Albania) Ada Velipojë, qualifying round, 2012–13
- Biggest margin of victory, final game:
  - Two-legged final era (2002–03 to 2008–09)
    - Single game: **6** – (Germany) Duisburg 6–0 (Russia) Zvezda Perm, 2009, first leg
    - Aggregate: **8** – (Sweden) Umeå 8–0 (3–0, 5–0) (Germany) Frankfurt, 2004
  - Single-legged final era (2001–02, 2009–10 to present): **4**
    - (Spain) Barcelona 4–0 (England) Chelsea, 2021
    - (Spain) Barcelona 4–0 (France) OL Lyonnes, 2026
- Most goals scored in a match, one team: **21** – (Cyprus) Apollon Limassol 21–0 (Albania) Ada Velipojë, qualifying round, 2012–13
- Most goals scored in a final game, both teams: **7** – (Germany) Wolfsburg 4–3 (Sweden) Tyresö, 2014

=== Tournament ===
- Most goals scored in a tournament: **470 goals** – 2007–08
- Fewest goals scored in a tournament: **186 goals** – 2015–16
- Most goals per match in a tournament: **5.36 goals per match** – 2001–02
- Fewest goals per match in a tournament: **3.05 goals per match** – 2015–16

== Penalty shoot-outs ==
- Most shoot-outs, team, all-time: 2
  - (Germany) Frankfurt (2003, 2016)
  - (Germany) Turbine Potsdam (twice in 2010)
- Most shoot-outs, team, in one tournament: 2 – (Germany) Turbine Potsdam, 2009–10
- Most shoot-outs, all teams, in one tournament: 2 – 2009–10
- Most wins, team, all-time: 2 – (Germany) Turbine Potsdam
- Most successful kicks, team, all-time: 11 – (Germany) Frankfurt (in 2 shoot-outs)
- Most successful kicks, team, in one tournament: 10 – (Germany) Turbine Potsdam, 2009–10 (in 2 shoot-outs)
- Most successful kicks, all teams, in one tournament: 17 – 2009–10 (in 2 shoot-outs)
