= 2016–17 in German football =

Football in Germany
- Season: 2016–17

Men's football
- Bundesliga: Bayern Munich
- 2. Bundesliga: VfB Stuttgart
- 3. Liga: MSV Duisburg
- DFB-Pokal: Borussia Dortmund
- DFL-Supercup: Bayern Munich

Women's football
- Frauen-Bundesliga: VfL Wolfsburg
- DFB-Pokal: VfL Wolfsburg

The 2016–17 season was the 107th season of competitive football in Germany.

== Promotion and relegation ==
=== Pre–season ===
League	Promoted to League	Relegated from League
Bundesliga	SC Freiburg; RB Leipzig	VfB Stuttgart; Hannover 96
2. Bundesliga	Dynamo Dresden; Erzgebirge Aue; Würzburger Kickers	MSV Duisburg; FSV Frankfurt; SC Paderborn 07
3. Liga	FSV Zwickau; Sportfreunde Lotte; Jahn Regensburg	Stuttgarter Kickers; Energie Cottbus; VfB Stuttgart II
Bundesliga (women)	MSV Duisburg; Borussia Mönchengladbach	Werder Bremen; 1. FC Köln
2. Bundesliga (women)	Bramfelder SV; 1. FC Union Berlin; Arminia Bielefeld; 1. FFC 08 Niederkirchen; SC Sand II	ETSV Würzburg; Alemannia Aachen; Blau-Weiß Hohen Neuendorf; FFV Leipzig; Holstein Kiel

=== Post–season ===
League	Promoted to League	Relegated from League
Bundesliga	VfB Stuttgart; Hannover 96	FC Ingolstadt; Darmstadt 98
2. Bundesliga	MSV Duisburg; Holstein Kiel; Jahn Regensburg	1860 Munich^{1}; Würzburger Kickers; Karlsruher SC
3. Liga	Carl Zeiss Jena; SV Meppen; SpVgg Unterhaching	Mainz 05 II; FSV Frankfurt
Bundesliga (women)	Werder Bremen; 1. FC Köln	Bayer Leverkusen; Borussia Mönchengladbach
2. Bundesliga (women)	TV Jahn Delmenhorst; FF USV Jena II; 1. FC Köln II; SG Andernach; SC Freiburg II	Union Berlin; Bramfelder SV; SC Sand II; SV 67 Weinberg; TSV Crailsheim

1860 Munich was relegated to the 2017–18 Regionalliga Bayern due to not being able to obtain a license for 2017–18 3. Liga, sparing SC Paderborn from relegation from 2016–17 3. Liga pending decision by the DFB.

== National teams ==
=== Germany national football team ===
==== 2018 FIFA World Cup qualifying UEFA Group C ====
Pos	Team	Pld	W	D	L	GF	GA	GD	Pts	Qualification
1	Germany	10	10	0	0	43	4	+39	30	Qualification to 2018 FIFA World Cup
2	Northern Ireland	10	6	1	3	17	6	+11	19	Advance to second round
3	Czech Republic	10	4	3	3	17	10	+7	15	
4	Norway	10	4	1	5	17	16	+1	13	
5	Azerbaijan	10	3	1	6	10	19	−9	10	
6	San Marino	10	0	0	10	2	51	−49	0	

Source: FIFA
Rules for classification: Qualification tiebreakers

Win Draw Loss

4 September 2016 2018 FIFA World Cup Q	Norway	0–3	Germany	Oslo, Norway
20:45 CEST (UTC+02:00)		Report (FIFA); Report (UEFA)	Müller 15', 60'; Kimmich 45'	Stadium: Ullevaal Stadion; Attendance: 26,793; Referee: (Scotland) William Collum

8 October 2016 2018 FIFA World Cup Q	Germany	3–0	Czech Republic	Hamburg, Germany
20:45 CEST (UTC+02:00)	Müller 13', 65'; Kroos 49'	Report (FIFA); Report (UEFA)		Stadium: Volksparkstadion; Attendance: 51,299; Referee: (Romania) Ovidiu Hațegan

11 October 2016 2018 FIFA World Cup Q	Germany	2–0	Northern Ireland	Hannover, Germany
20:45 CEST (UTC+02:00)	Draxler 13'; Khedira 17'	Report (FIFA); Report (UEFA)		Stadium: HDI-Arena; Attendance: 42,132; Referee: (Italy) Paolo Tagliavento

11 November 2016 2018 FIFA World Cup Q	San Marino	0–8	Germany	Serravalle, San Marino
20:45 CET (UTC+01:00)		Report (FIFA); Report (UEFA)	Khedira 7'; Gnabry 9', 58', 76'; Hector 32', 65'; Stefanelli 82' (o.g.); Volland 85'	Stadium: San Marino Stadium; Attendance: 3,851; Referee: (Kazakhstan) Artyom Kuchin

26 March 2017 2018 FIFA World Cup Q	Azerbaijan	1–4	Germany	Baku, Azerbaijan
21:00 AZST (UTC+05:00)	Nazarov 30'	Report (FIFA); Report (UEFA)	Schürrle 19', 80'; Müller 35'; Gómez 44'	Stadium: Tofiq Bahramov Stadium; Referee: (Italy) Daniele Orsato

10 June 2017 2018 FIFA World Cup Q	Germany	7–0	San Marino	Nuremberg, Germany
20:45 CEST (UTC+02:00)	Draxler 11'; Wagner 16', 29', 85'; Younes 38'; Mustafi 47'; Brandt 72'	Report (FIFA); Report (UEFA)		Stadium: Stadion Nürnberg; Attendance: 32,467; Referee: (Romania) Radu Petrescu

==== 2017 FIFA Confederations Cup ====
Germany won the FIFA Confederations Cup for the first time with a 1–0 victory over Chile in the final.

Pos	Team	Pld	W	D	L	GF	GA	GD	Pts	Qualification
1	Germany	3	2	1	0	7	4	+3	7	Advance to knockout stage
2	Chile	3	1	2	0	4	2	+2	5	Advance to knockout stage
3	Australia	3	0	2	1	4	5	−1	2	
4	Cameroon	3	0	1	2	2	6	−4	1	

Source: FIFA
Rules for classification: Group stage tiebreakers

Win Draw Loss

19 June 2017 Group B	Australia	2–3	Germany	Sochi, Russia
18:00 MSK (UTC+03:00); 17:00 CEST (UTC+02:00)	Rogić 41'; Juric 56'	Report (FIFA)	Stindl 5'; Draxler 44' (pen.); Goretzka 48'	Stadium: Fisht Olympic Stadium; Attendance: 28,605; Referee: (United States) Mark Geiger

22 June 2017 Group B	Germany	1–1	Chile	Kazan, Russia
21:00 MSK (UTC+03:00); 20:00 CEST (UTC+02:00)	Stindl 41'	Report (FIFA)	Sánchez 6'	Stadium: Kazan Arena; Attendance: 38,222; Referee: (Iran) Alireza Faghani

25 June 2017 Group B	Germany	3–1	Cameroon	Sochi, Russia
18:00 MSK (UTC+03:00); 17:00 CEST (UTC+02:00)	Demirbay 48'; Werner 66', 81'	Report (FIFA)	Aboubakar 78'	Stadium: Fisht Olympic Stadium; Attendance: 30,230; Referee: (Colombia) Wilmar Roldán

29 June 2017 Semi-final	Germany	4–1	Mexico	Sochi, Russia
21:00 MSK (UTC+03:00); 20:00 CEST (UTC+02:00)	Goretzka 6', 8'; Werner 59'; Younes 90+1'	Report (FIFA)	Fabián 89'	Stadium: Fisht Olympic Stadium; Attendance: 37,923; Referee: (Argentina) Néstor Pitana

2 July 2017 Final	Chile	0–1	Germany	Saint Petersburg, Russia
21:00 MSK (UTC+03:00); 20:00 CEST (UTC+02:00)		Report (FIFA)	Stindl 20'	Stadium: Krestovsky Stadium; Attendance: 57,268; Referee: (Serbia) Milorad Mažić

==== Friendly matches ====
Win Draw Loss

31 August 2016 Friendly	Germany	2–0	Finland	Mönchengladbach, Germany
20:45 CEST (UTC+02:00)	Meyer 55'; Özil 77'	Report		Stadium: Borussia-Park; Attendance: 30,121; Referee: (Belarus) Aliaksei Kulbakov

15 November 2016 Friendly	Italy	0–0	Germany	Milan, Italy
20:45 CET (UTC+01:00)		Report		Stadium: Stadio Giuseppe Meazza; Attendance: 48,600; Referee: (Portugal) Artur Soares Dias

22 March 2017 Friendly	Germany	1–0	England	Dortmund, Germany
20:45 CET (UTC+01:00)	Podolski 69'	Report (DFB)		Stadium: Signal Iduna Park; Attendance: 60,109; Referee: (Slovenia) Damir Skomina

6 June 2017 Friendly	Denmark	1–1	Germany	Copenhagen, Denmark
20:45 CEST (UTC+02:00)	Eriksen 18'	Report (DFB)	Kimmich 88'	Stadium: Parken Stadium; Attendance: 15,488; Referee: (England) Michael Oliver

=== Germany women's national football team ===
==== UEFA Women's Euro 2017 qualifying ====
Pos	Team	Pld	W	D	L	GF	GA	GD	Pts	Qualification
1	Germany	8	8	0	0	35	0	+35	24	Final tournament
2	Russia	8	4	2	2	14	9	+5	14	Final tournament
3	Hungary	8	2	2	4	8	20	−12	8	
4	Croatia	8	2	1	5	8	15	−7	7	
5	Turkey	8	1	1	6	3	24	−21	4	

Source: UEFA
Rules for classification: Qualification tiebreakers

Win Draw Loss

16 September 2016 2017 UEFA Euro qualifying	Russia	0–4	Germany	Khimki
19:00 MSK (UTC+3)		Report	Tsybutovich 7' (o.g.); Maier 14'; Hendrich 26'; Petermann 78'	Stadium: Arena Khimki; Attendance: 500; Referee: (Romania) Cristina Dorcioman

20 September 2016 2017 UEFA Euro qualifying	Hungary	0–1	Germany	Győr
16:00 CEST (UTC+2)		Report	Szabó 29' (o.g.)	Stadium: Gyirmóti Stadium; Attendance: 1,000; Referee: (Finland) Lina Lehtovaara

==== 2016 Summer Olympics ====
Pos	Team	Pld	W	D	L	GF	GA	GD	Pts	Qualification
1	Canada	3	3	0	0	7	2	+5	9	Quarter-finals
2	Germany	3	1	1	1	9	5	+4	4	Quarter-finals
3	Australia	3	1	1	1	8	5	+3	4	Quarter-finals
4	Zimbabwe	3	0	0	3	3	15	−12	0	

Source: Rio2016 & FIFA
Rules for classification: Tiebreakers

Win Draw Loss

3 August 2016 Group F	Zimbabwe	1–6	Germany	São Paulo, Brazil
18:00 BRT (UTC−3)	Basopo 50'	Report	Däbritz 22'; Popp 36'; Behringer 53', 78'; Leupolz 83'; Chibanda 90' (o.g.)	Stadium: Arena Corinthians; Attendance: 20,521; Referee: Rita Gani (Malaysia)

6 August 2016 Group F	Germany	2–2	Australia	São Paulo, Brazil
18:00 BRT (UTC−3)	Däbritz 45+2'; Bartusiak 88'	Report	Kerr 6'; Foord 45'	Stadium: Arena Corinthians; Attendance: 37,475; Referee: Anna-Marie Keighley (New Zealand)

9 August 2016 Group F	Germany	1–2	Canada	Brasília, Brazil
16:00 BRT (UTC−3)	Behringer 13' (pen.)	Report	Tancredi 26', 60'	Stadium: Estádio Nacional Mané Garrincha; Attendance: 8,227; Referee: Ri Hyang-ok (North Korea)

12 August 2016 Quarter-final	China	0–1	Germany	Salvador, Brazil
16:00 BRT (UTC−3)		Report	Behringer 76'	Stadium: Itaipava Arena Fonte Nova; Attendance: 9,642; Referee: Kateryna Monzul (Ukraine)

16 August 2016 Semi-final	Canada	0–2	Germany	Belo Horizonte, Brazil
16:00 BRT (UTC−3)		Report	Behringer 21'; Däbritz 59'	Stadium: Mineirão; Attendance: 5,641; Referee: Ri Hyang-ok (North Korea)

19 August 2016 Gold medal match	Sweden	1–2	Germany	Rio de Janeiro, Brazil
17:30 BRT (UTC−3)	Blackstenius 67'	Report	Marozsán 48'; Sembrant 62' (o.g.)	Stadium: Maracanã; Attendance: 52,432; Referee: Carol Chenard (Canada)

==== 2017 SheBelieves Cup ====
Pos	Team	Pld	W	D	L	GF	GA	GD	Pts
1	France (C)	3	2	1	0	5	1	+4	7
2	Germany	3	1	1	1	1	1	0	4
3	England	3	1	0	2	2	3	−1	3
4	United States (H)	3	1	0	2	1	4	−3	3

Source: Flashscore
Rules for classification: 1) points; 2) Goal difference; 3) Goals scored; 4) head-to-head points; 5) head-to-head goal difference; 6) head-to-head number of goals scored; 7) FIFA ranking.
(C) Champions; (H) Hosts

Win Draw Loss

1 March 2017 2017 SheBelieves Cup	United States	1–0	Germany	Chester, Pennsylvania, United States
19:00 EST (UTC−5)	Williams 56'	Report		Stadium: Talen Energy Stadium; Attendance: 16,318; Referee: (Canada) Carol Chenard

4 March 2017 2017 SheBelieves Cup	France	0–0	Germany	Harrison, New Jersey, United States
14:15 EST (UTC−5)		Report		Stadium: Red Bull Arena; Attendance: 10,000; Referee: (United States) Karen Abt

7 March 2017 2017 SheBelieves Cup	Germany	1–0	England	Washington, D.C., United States
16:00 EST (UTC−5)	Mittag 44'	Report		Stadium: Robert F. Kennedy Memorial Stadium; Attendance: 10,000; Referee: (Canada) Michelle Pye

==== UEFA Women's Euro 2017 ====
Pos	Team	Pld	W	D	L	GF	GA	GD	Pts	Qualification
1	Germany	3	2	1	0	4	1	+3	7	Knockout stage
2	Sweden	3	1	1	1	4	3	+1	4	Knockout stage
3	Russia	3	1	0	2	2	5	−3	3	
4	Italy	3	1	0	2	5	6	−1	3	

Source: UEFA
Rules for classification: Group stage tiebreakers

Win Draw Loss

17 July 2017 Group Stage	Germany	0–0	Sweden	Breda, Netherlands
20:45 CEST (UTC+2)		Report		Stadium: Rat Verlegh Stadion; Attendance: 9,276; Referee: (Hungary) Katalin Kulcsár

21 July 2017 Group Stage	Germany	2–1	Italy	Tilburg, Netherlands
20:45 CEST (UTC+2)	Henning 19'; Peter 67' (pen.)	Report	Mauro 29'	Stadium: Koning Willem II Stadion; Attendance: 7,108; Referee: (Ukraine) Kateryna Monzul

25 July 2017 Group Stage	Russia	0–2	Germany	Utrecht, Netherlands
20:45 CEST (UTC+2)		Report	Peter 10' (pen.); Marozsán 56' (pen.)	Stadium: Stadion Galgenwaard; Attendance: 6,458; Referee: (Poland) Monika Mularczyk

30 July 2017 Quarter-final	Germany	1–2	Denmark	Rotterdam, Netherlands
12:00 CEST (UTC+2)	Kerschowski 3'	Report	Nadim 49'; Nielsen 83'	Stadium: Sparta Stadion Het Kasteel; Attendance: 5,251; Referee: (Hungary) Katalin Kulcsár
Note: The match was originally scheduled on 29 July 2017, 20:45 CEST, but was postponed to the following day due to adverse weather conditions.

==== Friendlies ====
Win Draw Loss

22 October 2016 Friendly	Germany	4–2	Austria	Regensburg
14:15 CEST (UTC+2)	Mittag 8', 41'; Faißt 75'; Petermann 81' (pen.)	Report	Feiersinger 48'; Burger 54'	Stadium: Continental Arena; Attendance: 9,459; Referee: (Scotland) Morag Pirie

25 October 2016 Friendly	Germany	4–2	Netherlands	Aalen
16:10 CEST (UTC+2)	Islacker 22', 27'; Mittag 40'; Kemme 44'	Report	Spitse 38' (pen.); Miedema 88'	Stadium: Scholz-Arena; Attendance: 3,345; Referee: (Hungary) Judit Kulcsár

29 November 2016 Friendly	Germany	1–1	Norway	Chemnitz
16:00 CET (UTC+1)	Henning 32'	Report	Hegerberg 13'	Stadium: community4you ARENA; Attendance: 6,031; Referee: (France) Stéphanie Frappart

9 April 2017 Friendly	Germany	2–1	Canada	Erfurt
15:00 CEST (UTC+2)	Sheridan 13' (o.g.); Dallmann 86'	Report	Rose 38'	Stadium: Steigerwaldstadion; Attendance: 10,023; Referee: (Czech Republic) Olga Zadinová

4 July 2017 Friendly	Germany	3–1	Brazil	Sandhausen
17:45 CEST (UTC+2)	Dallmann 30'; Kayikçi 65'; Maier 78'	Report	Ludmila 49'	Stadium: Hardtwaldstadion; Referee: (England) Amy Fearn

== League season ==
=== Men ===
==== Bundesliga ====
===== Bundesliga standings =====
Pos	Team	Pld	W	D	L	GF	GA	GD	Pts	Qualification or relegation
1	Bayern Munich (C)	34	25	7	2	89	22	+67	82	Qualification for the Champions League group stage
2	RB Leipzig	34	20	7	7	66	39	+27	67	Qualification for the Champions League group stage
3	Borussia Dortmund	34	18	10	6	72	40	+32	64	Qualification for the Champions League group stage
4	1899 Hoffenheim	34	16	14	4	64	37	+27	62	Qualification for the Champions League play-off round
5	1. FC Köln	34	12	13	9	51	42	+9	49	Qualification for the Europa League group stage (Note: Since the winners of the 2016–17 DFB-Pokal, Borussia Dortmund, qualified for the Champions League based on league position, the Europa League group stage spot was passed to the sixth-placed team, Hertha BSC; and the Europa League third qualifying round spot was passed to the seventh-placed team, SC Freiburg.)
6	Hertha BSC	34	15	4	15	43	47	−4	49	Qualification for the Europa League group stage
7	SC Freiburg	34	14	6	14	42	60	−18	48	Qualification for the Europa League third qualifying round
8	Werder Bremen	34	13	6	15	61	64	−3	45	
9	Borussia Mönchengladbach	34	12	9	13	45	49	−4	45	
10	Schalke 04	34	11	10	13	45	40	+5	43	
11	Eintracht Frankfurt	34	11	9	14	36	43	−7	42	
12	Bayer Leverkusen	34	11	8	15	53	55	−2	41	
13	FC Augsburg	34	9	11	14	35	51	−16	38	
14	Hamburger SV	34	10	8	16	33	61	−28	38	
15	Mainz 05	34	10	7	17	44	55	−11	37	
16	VfL Wolfsburg (O)	34	10	7	17	34	52	−18	37	Qualification for the relegation play-offs
17	FC Ingolstadt (R)	34	8	8	18	36	57	−21	32	Relegation to 2. Bundesliga
18	Darmstadt 98 (R)	34	7	4	23	28	63	−35	25	Relegation to 2. Bundesliga

Source: DFB
Rules for classification: 1) Points; 2) Goal difference; 3) Goals scored; 4) Head-to-head points; 5) Head-to-head goal difference; 6) Head-to-head away goals scored; 7) Away goals scored; 8) Play-off.
(C) Champions; (O) Play-off winners; (R) Relegated

==== 2. Bundesliga ====
===== 2. Bundesliga standings =====
Pos	Team	Pld	W	D	L	GF	GA	GD	Pts	Promotion, qualification or relegation
1	VfB Stuttgart (C, P)	34	21	6	7	63	37	+26	69	Promotion to Bundesliga
2	Hannover 96 (P)	34	19	10	5	51	32	+19	67	Promotion to Bundesliga
3	Eintracht Braunschweig	34	19	9	6	50	36	+14	66	Qualification for promotion play-offs
4	Union Berlin	34	18	6	10	51	39	+12	60	
5	Dynamo Dresden	34	13	11	10	53	46	+7	50	
6	1. FC Heidenheim	34	12	10	12	43	39	+4	46	
7	FC St. Pauli	34	12	9	13	39	35	+4	45	
8	Greuther Fürth	34	12	9	13	33	40	−7	45	
9	VfL Bochum	34	10	14	10	42	47	−5	44	
10	SV Sandhausen	34	10	12	12	41	36	+5	42	
11	Fortuna Düsseldorf	34	10	12	12	37	39	−2	42	
12	1. FC Nürnberg	34	12	6	16	46	52	−6	42	
13	1. FC Kaiserslautern	34	10	11	13	29	33	−4	41	
14	Erzgebirge Aue	34	10	9	15	37	52	−15	39	
15	Arminia Bielefeld	34	8	13	13	50	54	−4	37	
16	1860 Munich (Note: 1860 Munich, who lost in the relegation play-offs, were unable to obtain a license for the 2017–18 3. Liga. Therefore, 1860 Munich was relegated to the Regionalliga Bayern.) (R)	34	10	6	18	37	47	−10	36	Qualification for relegation play-offs
17	Würzburger Kickers (R)	34	7	13	14	32	41	−9	34	Relegation to 3. Liga
18	Karlsruher SC (R)	34	5	10	19	27	56	−29	25	Relegation to 3. Liga

Source: DFB
Rules for classification: 1) Points; 2) Goal difference; 3) Goals scored
(C) Champions; (P) Promoted; (R) Relegated

==== 3. Liga ====
===== 3. Liga standings =====
Pos	Team	Pld	W	D	L	GF	GA	GD	Pts	Promotion, qualification or relegation
1	MSV Duisburg (C, P)	38	18	14	6	52	32	+20	68	Promotion to 2. Bundesliga and qualification for DFB-Pokal
2	Holstein Kiel (P)	38	18	13	7	59	25	+34	67	Promotion to 2. Bundesliga and qualification for DFB-Pokal
3	Jahn Regensburg (O, P)	38	18	9	11	62	50	+12	63	Qualification for promotion play-offs and DFB-Pokal
4	1. FC Magdeburg	38	16	13	9	53	36	+17	61	Qualification for DFB-Pokal
5	FSV Zwickau	38	16	8	14	47	54	−7	56	
6	VfL Osnabrück	38	15	9	14	46	43	+3	54	
7	Wehen Wiesbaden	38	14	11	13	45	42	+3	53	
8	Chemnitzer FC	38	14	10	14	54	51	+3	52	
9	Preußen Münster	38	15	6	17	49	43	+6	51	
10	Sonnenhof Großaspach	38	14	9	15	48	48	0	51	
11	VfR Aalen (Note: On 10 March 2017, VfR Aalen was deducted nine points for filing in for insolvency. On 15 March 2017, Aalen objected the decision. The DFB rejected the appeal on 24 March 2017. After Aalen again appealed the decision, it was rejected once more on 11 April 2017. On 4 May 2017, the DFB rejected the next appeal from Aalen. It was again denied on 18 May 2017.)	38	14	15	9	52	36	+16	48	
12	Sportfreunde Lotte	38	13	9	16	46	47	−1	48	
13	Hallescher FC	38	10	18	10	34	39	−5	48	
14	Rot-Weiß Erfurt	38	12	11	15	34	47	−13	47	
15	Hansa Rostock	38	10	16	12	44	46	−2	46	
16	Fortuna Köln	38	12	10	16	37	59	−22	46	
17	Werder Bremen II (Note: Reserve teams are ineligible for promotion or DFB-Pokal qualification.)	38	12	9	17	32	48	−16	45	
18	SC Paderborn (Note: SC Paderborn were originally relegated from the 2016–17 3. Liga after finishing 18th. However, 1860 Munich, who were relegated from the 2016–17 2. Bundesliga, were unable to obtain a license for the 2017–18 3. Liga. Therefore, SC Paderborn, who submitted a 3. Liga license application, remained in the league for the 2017–18 season.)	38	12	8	18	38	57	−19	44	
19	Mainz 05 II (R)	38	11	7	20	41	58	−17	40	Relegation to Regionalliga
20	FSV Frankfurt (Note: On 24 April 2017, FSV Frankfurt was deducted nine points for filing in for insolvency. Frankfurt appealed on 27 April 2017. On 4 May 2017, the appeal was rejected from the DFB. Another appeal was turned down on 10 May 2017. Frankfurt accepted the penalty on 17 May 2017.) (R)	38	7	13	18	38	50	−12	25	Relegation to Regionalliga

Source: DFB
Rules for classification: 1) Points; 2) Goal difference; 3) Goals scored
(C) Champions; (O) Play-off winners; (P) Promoted; (R) Relegated

== German clubs in Europe ==
=== UEFA Champions League ===
==== Play-off round ====
Team 1	Agg.	Team 2	1st leg	2nd leg
Young Boys (Switzerland)	2–9	(Germany) Borussia Mönchengladbach	1–3	1–6

==== Group stage ====
===== Group C =====
Pos	Team	Pld	W	D	L	GF	GA	GD	Pts	Qualification	BAR	MCI	BMG	CEL
1	(Spain) Barcelona	6	5	0	1	20	4	+16	15	Advance to knockout phase	—	4–0	4–0	7–0
2	(England) Manchester City	6	2	3	1	12	10	+2	9	Advance to knockout phase	3–1	—	4–0	1–1
3	(Germany) Borussia Mönchengladbach	6	1	2	3	5	12	−7	5	Transfer to Europa League	1–2	1–1	—	1–1
4	(Scotland) Celtic	6	0	3	3	5	16	−11	3		0–2	3–3	0–2	—

Source: UEFA

===== Group D =====
Pos	Team	Pld	W	D	L	GF	GA	GD	Pts	Qualification	ATM	BAY	RST	PSV
1	(Spain) Atlético Madrid	6	5	0	1	7	2	+5	15	Advance to knockout phase	—	1–0	2–1	2–0
2	(Germany) Bayern Munich	6	4	0	2	14	6	+8	12	Advance to knockout phase	1–0	—	5–0	4–1
3	(Russia) Rostov	6	1	2	3	6	12	−6	5	Transfer to Europa League	0–1	3–2	—	2–2
4	(Netherlands) PSV Eindhoven	6	0	2	4	4	11	−7	2		0–1	1–2	0–0	—

Source: UEFA

===== Group E =====
Pos	Team	Pld	W	D	L	GF	GA	GD	Pts	Qualification	MON	LEV	TOT	CSKA
1	(France) Monaco	6	3	2	1	9	7	+2	11	Advance to knockout phase	—	1–1	2–1	3–0
2	(Germany) Bayer Leverkusen	6	2	4	0	8	4	+4	10	Advance to knockout phase	3–0	—	0–0	2–2
3	(England) Tottenham Hotspur	6	2	1	3	6	6	0	7	Transfer to Europa League	1–2	0–1	—	3–1
4	(Russia) CSKA Moscow	6	0	3	3	5	11	−6	3		1–1	1–1	0–1	—

Source: UEFA

===== Group F =====
Pos	Team	Pld	W	D	L	GF	GA	GD	Pts	Qualification	DOR	RMA	LEG	SPO
1	(Germany) Borussia Dortmund	6	4	2	0	21	9	+12	14	Advance to knockout phase	—	2–2	8–4	1–0
2	(Spain) Real Madrid	6	3	3	0	16	10	+6	12	Advance to knockout phase	2–2	—	5–1	2–1
3	(Poland) Legia Warsaw	6	1	1	4	9	24	−15	4	Transfer to Europa League	0–6	3–3	—	1–0
4	(Portugal) Sporting CP	6	1	0	5	5	8	−3	3		1–2	1–2	2–0	—

Source: UEFA

==== Knockout phase ====
===== Round of 16 =====
Team 1	Agg.	Team 2	1st leg	2nd leg
Benfica (Portugal)	1–4	(Germany) Borussia Dortmund	1–0	0–4
Bayern Munich (Germany)	10–2	(England) Arsenal	5–1	5–1
Bayer Leverkusen (Germany)	2–4	(Spain) Atlético Madrid	2–4	0–0

===== Quarter-finals =====
Team 1	Agg.	Team 2	1st leg	2nd leg
Borussia Dortmund (Germany)	3–6	(France) Monaco	2–3	1–3
Bayern Munich (Germany)	3–6	(Spain) Real Madrid	1–2	2–4 (a.e.t.)

=== UEFA Europa League ===
==== Third qualifying round ====
Team 1	Agg.	Team 2	1st leg	2nd leg
Hertha BSC (Germany)	2–3	(Denmark) Brøndby	1–0	1–3

==== Group stage ====
===== Group C =====
Pos	Team	Pld	W	D	L	GF	GA	GD	Pts	Qualification	SET	AND	MNZ	QAB
1	(France) Saint-Étienne	6	3	3	0	8	5	+3	12	Advance to knockout phase	—	1–1	0–0	1–0
2	(Belgium) Anderlecht	6	3	2	1	16	8	+8	11	Advance to knockout phase	2–3	—	6–1	3–1
3	(Germany) Mainz 05	6	2	3	1	8	10	−2	9		1–1	1–1	—	2–0
4	(Azerbaijan) Gabala	6	0	0	6	5	14	−9	0		1–2	1–3	2–3	—

Source: UEFA

===== Group I =====
Pos	Team	Pld	W	D	L	GF	GA	GD	Pts	Qualification	SCH	KRA	SAL	NCE
1	(Germany) Schalke 04	6	5	0	1	9	3	+6	15	Advance to knockout phase	—	2–0	3–1	2–0
2	(Russia) Krasnodar	6	2	1	3	8	8	0	7	Advance to knockout phase	0–1	—	1–1	5–2
3	(Austria) Red Bull Salzburg	6	2	1	3	6	6	0	7		2–0	0–1	—	0–1
4	(France) Nice	6	2	0	4	5	11	−6	6		0–1	2–1	0–2	—

Source: UEFA

==== Knockout phase ====
===== Round of 32 =====
Team 1	Agg.	Team 2	1st leg	2nd leg
Borussia Mönchengladbach (Germany)	4–3	(Italy) Fiorentina	0–1	4–2
PAOK (Greece)	1–4	(Germany) Schalke 04	0–3	1–1

===== Round of 16 =====
Team 1	Agg.	Team 2	1st leg	2nd leg
Schalke 04 (Germany)	3–3 (a)	(Germany) Borussia Mönchengladbach	1–1	2–2

===== Quarter-finals =====
Team 1	Agg.	Team 2	1st leg	2nd leg
Ajax (Netherlands)	4–3	(Germany) Schalke 04	2–0	2–3 (a.e.t.)

=== UEFA Women's Champions League ===
==== Round of 32 ====
Team 1	Agg.	Team 2	1st leg	2nd leg
Chelsea (England)	1–4	(Germany) Wolfsburg	0–3	1–1
Hibernian (Scotland)	1–10	(Germany) Bayern Munich	0–6	1–4

==== Round of 16 ====
Team 1	Agg.	Team 2	1st leg	2nd leg
Eskilstuna United DFF (Sweden)	1–8	(Germany) Wolfsburg	1–5	0–3
Bayern Munich (Germany)	8–0	(Russia) Rossiyanka	4–0	4–0

==== Quarter-finals ====
Team 1	Agg.	Team 2	1st leg	2nd leg
Wolfsburg (Germany)	1–2	(France) Lyon	0–2	1–0
Bayern Munich (Germany)	1–4	(France) Paris Saint-Germain	1–0	0–4
