= 2015 Kazakhstani women's football championship =

Kazakhstani women's football championship
- Season: 2015
- Champions League: BIIK-Kazygurt
- Matches played: 40
- Goals scored: 237 (5.93 per match)
- Top goalscorer: Gulnara Gabelia (30)
- Biggest home win: BIIK-Kazygurt 19-0 ODYUCSH №2
- Biggest away win: ODYUCSH №2 0-12 BIIK-Kazygurt
- Highest scoring: BIIK-Kazygurt 19-0 ODYUCSH №2

The 2015 Kazakhstani women's football championship is the 11th season of the Kazakhstani women's football championship, the highest women's football league competition in Kazakhstan. The season began in April 2015 and finished in November. BIIK-Kazygurt were the defending championship title.

== Teams ==
Locations of teams in the 2015 Kazakhstani women's football championship

Team	Location	Venue	Capacity
BIIK-Kazygurt	Shymkent	BIIK Stadium	3,000
BIIK-SDYUCSH №7	Shymkent	Namys Stadium	3,000
CSHVSM-Barys	Almaty	KazNTU Stadium	3,000
Kokshe	Kokshetau	Zhastar Stadium	3,000
ODYCSH №2	Almaty	KazNTU Stadium	3,000

== Format ==
Team play each other four times, thus totalling 16 matches per team.

== League table ==
Pos	Team	Pld	W	D	L	GF	GA	GD	Pts	Promotion, qualification or relegation
1	BIIK-Kazygurt	16	16	0	0	112	4	+108	48	Qualification to Champions League
2	CSHVSM-Barys	16	8	3	5	41	21	+20	27	
3	Kokshe	16	5	5	6	32	24	+8	20	
4	BIIK-SDYUCSH №7	16	4	2	10	26	55	−29	14	
5	ODYCSH №2	16	2	0	14	9	110	−101	6	

Source: uefa.com
Rules for classification: 1) Points; 2) Goal difference; 3) Goals scored

== Top scorers ==
As of Match played 2 October 2015

Rank	Player	Club	Goals
1	(Georgia (country)) Gulnara Gabelia	BIIK-Kazygurt	30
2	(Nigeria) Charity Adule	BIIK-Kazygurt	27
3	(Mexico) Desirée Monsiváis	BIIK-Kazygurt	24
4	(Kazakhstan) Svetlana Bortnikova	BIIK-SDYUCSH №7	12
5	(Kazakhstan) Begaim Kirgizbaeva	CSHVSM-Barys	9
