= 2016–17 UEFA Women's Champions League knockout phase =

Tournament details
- Dates: 5 October 2016 – 1 June 2017
- Teams: 32 (from 20 associations)

Tournament statistics
- Matches played: 61
- Goals scored: 196 (3.21 per match)
- Attendance: 215,183 (3,528 per match)
- Top scorer(s): Zsanett Jakabfi; Vivianne Miedema (8 goals each)

The 2016–17 UEFA Women's Champions League knockout phase began on 5 October 2016 and concluded on 1 June 2017 with the final at the Cardiff City Stadium in Cardiff, Wales, which decided the champions of the 2016–17 UEFA Women's Champions League. A total of 32 teams competed in the knockout phase.

Lyon successfully defended their title after defeating Paris Saint-Germain in the final 7–6 on penalties after a goalless draw.

Times from 30 October 2016 up to 25 March 2017 (round of 16 and quarter-finals first legs) are CET (UTC+1), all other times are CEST (UTC+2).

== Round and draw dates ==
The schedule of the competition was as follows (all draws were held at the UEFA headquarters in Nyon, Switzerland).

Round	Draw	First leg	Second leg
Round of 32	1 September 2016	5–6 October 2016	12–13 October 2016
Round of 16	17 October 2016	9–10 November 2016	16–17 November 2016
Quarter-finals	25 November 2016	22–23 March 2017	29–30 March 2017
Semi-finals	25 November 2016	22–23 April 2017	29–30 April 2017
Final	25 November 2016	1 June 2017 at Cardiff City Stadium, Cardiff	

== Format ==
The knockout phase involved 32 teams: 23 teams which qualified directly, and the nine group winners from the qualifying round.

Each tie in the knockout phase, apart from the final, was played over two legs, with each team playing one leg at home. The team that scores more goals on aggregate over the two legs advanced to the next round. If the aggregate score was level, the away goals rule was applied, i.e. the team that scored more goals away from home over the two legs advanced. If away goals were also equal, then 30 minutes of extra time were played. The away goals rule was again applied after extra time, i.e. if there were goals scored during extra time and the aggregate score was still level, the visiting team advanced by virtue of more away goals scored. If no goals were scored during extra time, the tie was decided by a penalty shoot-out. In the final, which was played as a single match, if scores were level at the end of normal time, extra time was played, followed by a penalty shoot-out if scores remained tied.

The mechanism of the draws for each round was as follows:

- In the draw for the round of 32, the sixteen teams with the highest UEFA coefficients were seeded (with the title holders being the automatic top seed), and the other sixteen teams were unseeded. The seeded teams were drawn against the unseeded teams, with the seeded teams hosting the second leg. Teams from the same association could not be drawn against each other.
- In the draw for the round of 16, the eight teams with the highest UEFA coefficients were seeded (with the title holders being the automatic top seed should they qualify), and the other eight teams were unseeded. The seeded teams were drawn against the unseeded teams, with the order of legs decided by draw. Teams from the same association could not be drawn against each other.
- In the draws for the quarter-finals onwards, there were no seedings, and teams from the same association could be drawn against each other.

== Qualified teams ==
Below are the 32 teams which participated in the knockout phase (with their 2016 UEFA club coefficients, which took into account their performance in European competitions from 2011–12 to 2015–16 plus 33% of their association coefficient from the same time span).

Bye to round of 32
Team	Coeff
(France) Lyon (Title holders)	114.410
(Germany) Wolfsburg	116.535
(Sweden) Rosengård	85.615
(France) Paris Saint-Germain	74.410
(Denmark) Fortuna Hjørring	51.705
(Denmark) Brøndby	50.705
(Spain) Barcelona	49.695
(Russia) Rossiyanka	44.365
(Scotland) Glasgow City	39.900
(Czech Republic) Sparta Praha	36.550
(Germany) Bayern Munich	34.535
(Russia) Zvezda Perm	32.365
(Italy) Brescia	27.705
(Italy) AGSM Verona	25.705
(Czech Republic) Slavia Praha	25.550
(England) Chelsea	24.830
(Sweden) Eskilstuna United DFF	21.615
(Norway) Lillestrøm SK	21.405
(Austria) St. Pölten-Spratzern	18.065
(England) Manchester City	16.830
(Spain) Athletic Club	13.695
(Austria) Sturm Graz	10.065
(Scotland) Hibernian	9.900

Advanced from qualifying round
Group	Winners	Coeff
1	(Cyprus) Apollon Limassol	23.940
2	(Belarus) FC Minsk	7.800
3	(Iceland) Breiðablik	5.445
4	(Poland) Medyk Konin	13.445
5	(Switzerland) Zürich	34.240
6	(Bosnia and Herzegovina) SFK 2000	14.630
7	(Kazakhstan) BIIK Kazygurt	17.270
8	(Norway) Avaldsnes IL	9.405
9	(Netherlands) Twente	21.600

== Bracket ==
Round of 32
(Poland) Medyk Konin	4	2	6
(Italy) Brescia (a)	3	3	6
(Spain) Athletic Club	2	1	3
(Denmark) Fortuna Hjørring (a.e.t.)	1	3	4
(England) Manchester City	2	4	6
(Russia) Zvezda Perm	0	0	0
(Austria) St. Pölten-Spratzern	0	2	2
(Denmark) Brøndby	2	2	4
(Sweden) Eskilstuna United DFF	1	2	3
(Scotland) Glasgow City	0	1	1
(England) Chelsea	0	1	1
(Germany) Wolfsburg	3	1	4
(Norway) Avaldsnes IL	2	0	2
(France) Lyon	5	5	10
(Austria) Sturm Graz	0	0	0
(Switzerland) Zürich	6	3	9
(Cyprus) Apollon Limassol	1	2	3
(Czech Republic) Slavia Praha	1	3	4
(Iceland) Breiðablik	0	0	0
(Sweden) Rosengård	1	0	1
(Belarus) FC Minsk	0	1	1
(Spain) Barcelona	3	2	5
(Netherlands) Twente	2	3	5
(Czech Republic) Sparta Praha	0	1	1
(Scotland) Hibernian	0	1	1
(Germany) Bayern Munich	6	4	10
(Bosnia and Herzegovina) SFK 2000	0	1	1
(Russia) Rossiyanka	0	2	2
(Kazakhstan) BIIK Kazygurt	3	1	4
(Italy) AGSM Verona	1	1	2
(Norway) Lillestrøm SK	3	1	4
(France) Paris Saint-Germain	1	4	5

Round of 16
(Italy) Brescia	0	1	1
(Denmark) Fortuna Hjørring	1	3	4
(England) Manchester City	1	1	2
(Denmark) Brøndby	0	1	1
(Sweden) Eskilstuna United DFF	1	0	1
(Germany) Wolfsburg	5	3	8
(France) Lyon	8	9	17
(Switzerland) Zürich	0	0	0
(Czech Republic) Slavia Praha	1	0	1
(Sweden) Rosengård	3	3	6
(Spain) Barcelona	1	4	5
(Netherlands) Twente	0	0	0
(Germany) Bayern Munich	4	4	8
(Russia) Rossiyanka	0	0	0
(Kazakhstan) BIIK Kazygurt	0	1	1
(France) Paris Saint-Germain	3	4	7

Quarter-finals
(Denmark) Fortuna Hjørring	0	0	0
(England) Manchester City	1	1	2
(Germany) Wolfsburg	0	1	1
(France) Lyon	2	0	2
(Sweden) Rosengård	0	0	0
(Spain) Barcelona	1	2	3
(Germany) Bayern Munich	1	0	1
(France) Paris Saint-Germain	0	4	4

Semi-finals
(England) Manchester City	1	1	2
(France) Lyon	3	0	3
(Spain) Barcelona	1	0	1
(France) Paris Saint-Germain	3	2	5

Final
(France) Lyon (p)	0 (7)
(France) Paris Saint-Germain	0 (6)

== Round of 32 ==
The draw for the round of 32 was held on 1 September 2016, 13:30 CEST, at the UEFA headquarters in Nyon, Switzerland.

Seeded	Unseeded
(France) Lyon; (Germany) Wolfsburg; (Sweden) Rosengård; (France) Paris Saint-Germain; (Denmark) Fortuna Hjørring; (Denmark) Brøndby; (Spain) Barcelona; (Russia) Rossiyanka; (Scotland) Glasgow City; (Czech Republic) Sparta Praha; (Germany) Bayern Munich; (Switzerland) Zürich; (Russia) Zvezda Perm; (Italy) Brescia; (Italy) AGSM Verona; (Czech Republic) Slavia Praha	(England) Chelsea; (Cyprus) Apollon Limassol; (Sweden) Eskilstuna United DFF; (Netherlands) Twente; (Norway) Lillestrøm SK; (Austria) St. Pölten-Spratzern; (Kazakhstan) BIIK Kazygurt; (England) Manchester City; (Bosnia and Herzegovina) SFK 2000; (Spain) Athletic Club; (Poland) Medyk Konin; (Austria) Sturm Graz; (Scotland) Hibernian; (Norway) Avaldsnes IL; (Belarus) FC Minsk; (Iceland) Breiðablik

Notes

1. ^{†} Advanced from qualifying round.

=== Overview ===
The first legs were played on 5 and 6 October, and the second legs on 12 and 13 October 2016.

Team 1	Agg.	Team 2	1st leg	2nd leg
Sturm Graz (Austria)	0–9	(Switzerland) Zürich	0–6	0–3
Breiðablik (Iceland)	0–1	(Sweden) Rosengård	0–1	0–0
Lillestrøm SK (Norway)	4–5	(France) Paris Saint-Germain	3–1	1–4
Avaldsnes IL (Norway)	2–10	(France) Lyon	2–5	0–5
Eskilstuna United DFF (Sweden)	3–1	(Scotland) Glasgow City	1–0	2–1
SFK 2000 (Bosnia and Herzegovina)	1–2	(Russia) Rossiyanka	0–0	1–2
Chelsea (England)	1–4	(Germany) Wolfsburg	0–3	1–1
Twente (Netherlands)	5–1	(Czech Republic) Sparta Praha	2–0	3–1
Apollon Limassol (Cyprus)	3–4	(Czech Republic) Slavia Praha	1–1	2–3
Athletic Club (Spain)	3–4	(Denmark) Fortuna Hjørring	2–1	1–3 (a.e.t.)
FC Minsk (Belarus)	1–5	(Spain) Barcelona	0–3	1–2
Medyk Konin (Poland)	6–6 (a)	(Italy) Brescia	4–3	2–3
Manchester City (England)	6–0	(Russia) Zvezda Perm	2–0	4–0
BIIK Kazygurt (Kazakhstan)	4–2	(Italy) AGSM Verona	3–1	1–1
Hibernian (Scotland)	1–10	(Germany) Bayern Munich	0–6	1–4
St. Pölten-Spratzern (Austria)	2–4	(Denmark) Brøndby	0–2	2–2

=== Matches ===
5 October 2016
18:00

Sturm Graz (Austria)	0–6	(Switzerland) Zürich
	Report	Leon 2', 32', 67'; Franssi 63'; Kuster 72' (pen.); Humm 90+1'

Trainingszentrum Messendorf, Graz
Attendance: 1,835
Referee: Jana Adámková (Czech Republic)
12 October 2016
19:00

Zürich (Switzerland)	3–0	(Austria) Sturm Graz
Humm 21', 28'; Deplazes 74'	Report

Letzigrund, Zürich
Attendance: 3,600
Referee: Lina Lehtovaara (Finland)

Zürich won 9–0 on aggregate.

5 October 2016
17:30

Breiðablik (Iceland)	0–1	(Sweden) Rosengård
	Report	Schelin 8'

Kópavogsvöllur, Kópavogur
Attendance: 232
Referee: Sofia Karagiorgi (Cyprus)
12 October 2016
19:00

Rosengård (Sweden)	0–0	(Iceland) Breiðablik
	Report

Malmö IP, Malmö
Attendance: 984
Referee: Lorraine Clark (Scotland)

Rosengård won 1–0 on aggregate.

6 October 2016
19:00

Lillestrøm SK (Norway)	3–1	(France) Paris Saint-Germain
Haavi 67'; Mykjåland 82'; Spord 88'	Report	Paredes 35'

Åråsen Stadion, Lillestrøm
Attendance: 1,953
Referee: Kateryna Monzul (Ukraine)
13 October 2016
20:00

Paris Saint-Germain (France)	4–1	(Norway) Lillestrøm SK
Verónica Boquete 4' (pen.); Cristiane 20', 49', 74'	Report	Berget 90+2'

Stade Sébastien Charléty, Paris
Attendance: 612
Referee: Sara Persson (Sweden)

Paris Saint-Germain won 5–4 on aggregate.

5 October 2016
18:00

Avaldsnes IL (Norway)	2–5	(France) Lyon
Thorsnes 23'; Hansen 52'	Report	Kumagai 7' (pen.); Le Sommer 20'; Abily 48', 62'; Hegerberg 86'

Haugesund Stadion, Haugesund
Attendance: 4,619
Referee: Teodora Albon (Romania)
12 October 2016
20:45

Lyon (France)	5–0	(Norway) Avaldsnes IL
Renard 3'; Marozsán 41'; Cascarino 59'; Le Sommer 64', 74'	Report

Parc Olympique Lyonnais, Décines
Attendance: 5,089
Referee: Zuzana Kováčová (Slovakia)

Lyon won 10–2 on aggregate.

6 October 2016
19:00

Eskilstuna United DFF (Sweden)	1–0	(Scotland) Glasgow City
Larsson 52'	Report

Tunavallen, Eskilstuna
Attendance: 3,987
Referee: Tania Fernandes Morais (Luxembourg)
13 October 2016
20:45

Glasgow City (Scotland)	1–2	(Sweden) Eskilstuna United DFF
Crilly 46'	Report	Schough 7', 58'

Excelsior Stadium, Airdrie
Attendance: 728
Referee: Stéphanie Frappart (France)

Eskilstuna United DFF won 3–1 on aggregate.

5 October 2016
16:00

SFK 2000 (Bosnia and Herzegovina)	0–0	(Russia) Rossiyanka
	Report

Asim Ferhatović Hase Stadium, Sarajevo
Attendance: 570
Referee: Lois Otte (Belgium)
13 October 2016
18:00

Rossiyanka (Russia)	2–1	(Bosnia and Herzegovina) SFK 2000
Nrehy 50'; Nahi 90+4'	Report	Djoković 70' (pen.)

Rodina Stadium, Khimki
Attendance: 300
Referee: Désirée Grundbacher (Switzerland)

Rossiyanka won 2–1 on aggregate.

5 October 2016
20:00

Chelsea (England)	0–3	(Germany) Wolfsburg
	Report	Jakabfi 12', 39', 54'

Stamford Bridge, London
Attendance: 3,783
Referee: Efthalia Mitsi (Greece)
12 October 2016
18:00

Wolfsburg (Germany)	1–1	(England) Chelsea
Gunnarsdóttir 80'	Report	Aluko 43'

AOK Stadion, Wolfsburg
Attendance: 1,945
Referee: Carina Vitulano (Italy)

Wolfsburg won 4–1 on aggregate.

5 October 2016
19:00

Twente (Netherlands)	2–0	(Czech Republic) Sparta Praha
Waldus 79'; Roord 90+1'	Report

De Grolsch Veste, Enschede
Attendance: 2,365
Referee: Marta Huerta De Aza (Spain)
12 October 2016
18:00

Sparta Praha (Czech Republic)	1–3	(Netherlands) Twente
Stašková 34'	Report	Odehnalová 28' (o.g.); R. Jansen 82'; Roord 89'

Generali Arena, Prague
Attendance: 876
Referee: Linn Andersson (Sweden)

Twente won 5–1 on aggregate.

5 October 2016
18:00

Apollon Limassol (Cyprus)	1–1	(Czech Republic) Slavia Praha
Alborghetti 53' (pen.)	Report	Pincová 90+5'

Pafiako Stadium, Paphos
Attendance: 235
Referee: Elvira Nurmustafina (Kazakhstan)
12 October 2016
18:30

Slavia Praha (Czech Republic)	3–2	(Cyprus) Apollon Limassol
Divišová 19'; Svitková 41', 82'	Report	Witteman 10', 14'

Eden Arena, Prague
Attendance: 1,078
Referee: Vivian Peeters (Netherlands)

Slavia Praha won 4–3 on aggregate.

5 October 2016
19:30

Athletic Club (Spain)	2–1	(Denmark) Fortuna Hjørring
Corres 34'; Oroz 83'	Report	Smidt 71'

San Mamés Stadium, Bilbao
Attendance: 9,127
Referee: Cristina Dorcioman (Romania)
12 October 2016
19:00

Fortuna Hjørring (Denmark)	3–1 (a.e.t.)	(Spain) Athletic Club
Damjanović 49'; Larsen 84'; Tamires 119'	Report	Erika Vázquez 69'

Hjørring Stadium, Hjørring
Attendance: 1,225
Referee: Katalin Kulcsár (Hungary)

Fortuna Hjørring won 4–3 on aggregate.

6 October 2016
15:00

FC Minsk (Belarus)	0–3	(Spain) Barcelona
	Report	Hermoso 5', 90+1'; Torrejón 32'

FC Minsk Stadium, Minsk
Attendance: 2,300
Referee: Florence Guillemin (France)
12 October 2016
19:00

Barcelona (Spain)	2–1	(Belarus) FC Minsk
Hermoso 61' (pen.); Andressa Alves 75'	Report	Ogbiagbevha 51'

Mini Estadi, Barcelona
Attendance: 1,201
Referee: Dimitrina Milkova (Bulgaria)

Barcelona won 5–1 on aggregate.

5 October 2016
15:30

Medyk Konin (Poland)	4–3	(Italy) Brescia
Kostova 29', 84'; Sikora 76'; Gawrońska 79'	Report	Bonansea 18'; Cernoia 36'; Sabatino 70'

Stadion im. Złotej Jedenastki, Konin
Attendance: 686
Referee: Petra Chudá (Slovakia)
13 October 2016
20:30

Brescia (Italy)	3–2	(Poland) Medyk Konin
Slavcheva 15' (o.g.); Girelli 69'; Sabatino 83'	Report	Kostova 5'; Sikora 53'

Stadio Mario Rigamonti, Brescia
Attendance: 1,200
Referee: Viola Raudziņa (Latvia)

6–6 on aggregate. Brescia won on away goals.

6 October 2016
20:00

Manchester City (England)	2–0	(Russia) Zvezda Perm
Scott 34'; Bronze 90+3'	Report

Academy Stadium, Manchester
Attendance: 1,101
Referee: Monika Mularczyk (Poland)
12 October 2016
16:00

Zvezda Perm (Russia)	0–4	(England) Manchester City
	Report	Beattie 23', 52'; Bronze 32'; Christiansen 74'

Zvezda Stadium, Perm
Attendance: 3,500
Referee: Riem Hussein (Germany)

Manchester City won 6–0 on aggregate.

5 October 2016
11:00

BIIK Kazygurt (Kazakhstan)	3–1	(Italy) AGSM Verona
Adule 3'; Gabelia 12', 80'	Report	Gabbiadini 53'

BIIK Stadium, Shymkent
Attendance: 1,300
Referee: Eszter Urban (Hungary)
12 October 2016
20:30

AGSM Verona (Italy)	1–1	(Kazakhstan) BIIK Kazygurt
Gabbiadini 58' (pen.)	Report	Gabelia 40'

Stadio Marc'Antonio Bentegodi, Verona
Attendance: 1,900
Referee: Zuzana Valentová (Slovakia)

BIIK Kazygurt won 4–2 on aggregate.

5 October 2016
20:30

Hibernian (Scotland)	0–6	(Germany) Bayern Munich
	Report	Van der Gragt 6'; Miedema 26', 57'; Leupolz 38', 63'; Behringer 67' (pen.)

Easter Road, Edinburgh
Attendance: 2,551
Referee: Esther Staubli (Switzerland)
12 October 2016
18:00

Bayern Munich (Germany)	4–1	(Scotland) Hibernian
Gerhardt 6', 38'; Evans 33'; Miedema 72'	Report	Harrison 39'

Grünwalder Stadion, Munich
Attendance: 320
Referee: Marte Sørø (Norway)

Bayern Munich won 10–1 on aggregate.

5 October 2016
20:20

St. Pölten-Spratzern (Austria)	0–2	(Denmark) Brøndby
	Report	N. Sørensen 21', 63'

NV Arena, Sankt Pölten
Attendance: 950
Referee: Pernilla Larsson (Sweden)
12 October 2016
18:00

Brøndby (Denmark)	2–2	(Austria) St. Pölten-Spratzern
Boye Sørensen 61'; N. Sørensen 88'	Report	Vágó 55'; Pinther 82'

Brøndby Stadium, Brøndby
Attendance: 1,679
Referee: Gyöngyi Gaál (Hungary)

Brøndby won 4–2 on aggregate.

== Round of 16 ==
The draw for the round of 16 was held on 17 October 2016, 13:30 CEST, at the UEFA headquarters in Nyon, Switzerland.

Seeded	Unseeded
(France) Lyon; (Germany) Wolfsburg; (Sweden) Rosengård; (France) Paris Saint-Germain; (Denmark) Fortuna Hjørring; (Denmark) Brøndby; (Spain) Barcelona; (Russia) Rossiyanka	(Germany) Bayern Munich; (Switzerland) Zürich; (Italy) Brescia; (Czech Republic) Slavia Praha; (Sweden) Eskilstuna United DFF; (Netherlands) Twente; (Kazakhstan) BIIK Kazygurt; (England) Manchester City

=== Overview ===
The first legs were played on 9 and 10 November, and the second legs played on 16 and 17 November 2016.

Team 1	Agg.	Team 2	1st leg	2nd leg
BIIK Kazygurt (Kazakhstan)	1–7	(France) Paris Saint-Germain	0–3	1–4
Barcelona (Spain)	5–0	(Netherlands) Twente	1–0	4–0
Slavia Praha (Czech Republic)	1–6	(Sweden) Rosengård	1–3	0–3
Manchester City (England)	2–1	(Denmark) Brøndby	1–0	1–1
Brescia (Italy)	1–4	(Denmark) Fortuna Hjørring	0–1	1–3
Lyon (France)	17–0	(Switzerland) Zürich	8–0	9–0
Eskilstuna United DFF (Sweden)	1–8	(Germany) Wolfsburg	1–5	0–3
Bayern Munich (Germany)	8–0	(Russia) Rossiyanka	4–0	4–0

Notes

1. Order of legs reversed after original draw.

=== Matches ===
10 November 2016
10:00

BIIK Kazygurt (Kazakhstan)	0–3	(France) Paris Saint-Germain
	Report	Boquete 17'; Paredes 45+1', 59'

BIIK Stadium, Shymkent
Attendance: 550
Referee: Olga Zadinová (Czech Republic)
17 November 2016
19:00

Paris Saint-Germain (France)	4–1	(Kazakhstan) BIIK Kazygurt
Cruz 43'; Sarr 45+1', 79'; Delie 70'	Report	Adule 67'

Stade Sébastien Charléty, Paris
Attendance: 1,645
Referee: Lorraine Clark (Scotland)

Paris Saint-Germain won 7–1 on aggregate.

9 November 2016
18:30

Barcelona (Spain)	1–0	(Netherlands) Twente
Hermoso 10'	Report

Mini Estadi, Barcelona
Attendance: 1,051
Referee: Bibiana Steinhaus (Germany)
16 November 2016
19:00

Twente (Netherlands)	0–4	(Spain) Barcelona
	Report	Torrejón 18'; Andressa Alves 37'; Latorre 79'; N'Guessan 86'

De Grolsch Veste, Enschede
Attendance: 7,035
Referee: Efthalia Mitsi (Greece)

Barcelona won 5–0 on aggregate.

10 November 2016
18:30

Slavia Praha (Czech Republic)	1–3	(Sweden) Rosengård
Svitková 90+2'	Report	Masar 33'; Nilsson 36'; Enganamouit 44' (pen.)

FK Viktoria Stadion, Prague
Attendance: 1,347
Referee: Lina Lehtovaara (Finland)
16 November 2016
19:00

Rosengård (Sweden)	3–0	(Czech Republic) Slavia Praha
Masar 3'; Enganamouit 18', 19'	Report

Malmö IP, Malmö
Attendance: 532
Referee: Anastasia Pustovoitova (Russia)

Rosengård won 6–1 on aggregate.

9 November 2016
20:00

Manchester City (England)	1–0	(Denmark) Brøndby
Walsh 74'	Report

Academy Stadium, Manchester
Attendance: 1,256
Referee: Teodora Albon (Romania)
16 November 2016
18:00

Brøndby (Denmark)	1–1	(England) Manchester City
N. Christiansen 67'	Report	Duggan 65'

Brøndby Stadium, Brøndby
Attendance: 2,513
Referee: Carina Vitulano (Italy)

Manchester City won 2–1 on aggregate.

9 November 2016
20:30

Brescia (Italy)	0–1	(Denmark) Fortuna Hjørring
	Report	Tamires 42'

Stadio Mario Rigamonti, Brescia
Attendance: 1,107
Referee: Pernilla Larsson (Sweden)
16 November 2016
19:00

Fortuna Hjørring (Denmark)	3–1	(Italy) Brescia
Olar 36'; Larsen 49', 67'	Report	Manieri 81'

Hjørring Stadium, Hjørring
Attendance: 1,038
Referee: Kateryna Monzul (Ukraine)

Fortuna Hjørring won 4–1 on aggregate.

9 November 2016
18:15

Lyon (France)	8–0	(Switzerland) Zürich
Le Sommer 22', 35'; Mbock Bathy 26'; Hegerberg 29', 30', 41'; Tarrieu 90'; Lavogez 90+3'	Report

Parc Olympique Lyonnais, Décines
Attendance: 3,841
Referee: Esther Azzopardi (Malta)
16 November 2016
19:00

Zürich (Switzerland)	0–9	(France) Lyon
	Report	Abily 18', 39'; Seger 20'; Kumagai 42'; Lavogez 62', 63'; Tarrieu 64'; Renard 80'; Petit 88'

Letzigrund, Zürich
Attendance: 4,022
Referee: Marte Sørø (Norway)

Lyon won 17–0 on aggregate.

10 November 2016
19:00

Eskilstuna United DFF (Sweden)	1–5	(Germany) Wolfsburg
Banušić 31'	Report	Jakabfi 5', 17', 52', 63'; Popp 76'

Tunavallen, Eskilstuna
Attendance: 3,784
Referee: Cristina Dorcioman (Romania)
17 November 2016
18:00

Wolfsburg (Germany)	3–0	(Sweden) Eskilstuna United DFF
Dickenmann 38'; Jakabfi 62'; Bernauer 85'	Report

AOK Stadion, Wolfsburg
Attendance: 1,278
Referee: Esther Staubli (Switzerland)

Wolfsburg won 8–1 on aggregate.

9 November 2016
18:00

Bayern Munich (Germany)	4–0	(Russia) Rossiyanka
Evans 41'; Rolser 45+2'; Miedema 52', 75'	Report

Grünwalder Stadion, Munich
Attendance: 410
Referee: Sandra Bastos (Portugal)
17 November 2016
18:00

Rossiyanka (Russia)	0–4	(Germany) Bayern Munich
	Report	Miedema 42', 52'; Däbritz 72'; Holstad Berge 90+2'

Rodina Stadium, Khimki
Attendance: 500
Referee: Stéphanie Frappart (France)

Bayern Munich won 8–0 on aggregate.

== Quarter-finals ==
The draws for the quarter-finals and semi-finals were held on 25 November 2016, 13:30 CET, at the UEFA headquarters in Nyon, Switzerland.

=== Overview ===
The first legs were played on 22 and 23 March, and the second legs on 29 and 30 March 2017.

Team 1	Agg.	Team 2	1st leg	2nd leg
Fortuna Hjørring (Denmark)	0–2	(England) Manchester City	0–1	0–1
Rosengård (Sweden)	0–3	(Spain) Barcelona	0–1	0–2
Wolfsburg (Germany)	1–2	(France) Lyon	0–2	1–0
Bayern Munich (Germany)	1–4	(France) Paris Saint-Germain	1–0	0–4

=== Matches ===
23 March 2017
19:00

Fortuna Hjørring (Denmark)	0–1	(England) Manchester City
	Report	Lloyd 36'

Hjørring Stadium, Hjørring
Attendance: 2,036
Referee: Riem Hussein (Germany)
30 March 2017
20:00

Manchester City (England)	1–0	(Denmark) Fortuna Hjørring
Bronze 41'	Report

Academy Stadium, Manchester
Attendance: 2,148
Referee: Anastasia Pustovoitova (Russia)

Manchester City won 2–0 on aggregate.

22 March 2017
19:00

Rosengård (Sweden)	0–1	(Spain) Barcelona
	Report	Ouahabi 45+2'

Malmö IP, Malmö
Attendance: 5,037
Referee: Stéphanie Frappart (France)
29 March 2017
19:00

Barcelona (Spain)	2–0	(Sweden) Rosengård
Hermoso 52'; Caldentey 90+4'	Report

Mini Estadi, Barcelona
Attendance: 7,350
Referee: Kateryna Monzul (Ukraine)

Barcelona won 3–0 on aggregate.

23 March 2017
20:15

Wolfsburg (Germany)	0–2	(France) Lyon
	Report	Abily 62'; Marozsán 74'

AOK Stadion, Wolfsburg
Attendance: 3,705
Referee: Jana Adámková (Czech Republic)
29 March 2017
20:45

Lyon (France)	0–1	(Germany) Wolfsburg
	Report	Hansen 82' (pen.)

Parc Olympique Lyonnais, Décines
Attendance: 14,128
Referee: Monika Mularczyk (Poland)

Lyon won 2–1 on aggregate.

23 March 2017
19:00

Bayern Munich (Germany)	1–0	(France) Paris Saint-Germain
Miedema 72'	Report

Grünwalder Stadion, Munich
Attendance: 7,300
Referee: Pernilla Larsson (Sweden)
29 March 2017
20:00

Paris Saint-Germain (France)	4–0	(Germany) Bayern Munich
Delie 4'; Cristiane 12', 52'; Cruz 42'	Report

Parc des Princes, Paris
Attendance: 12,000
Referee: Carina Vitulano (Italy)

Paris Saint-Germain won 4–1 on aggregate.

== Semi-finals ==
=== Overview ===
The first legs were played on 22 April, and the second legs on 29 April 2017.

Team 1	Agg.	Team 2	1st leg	2nd leg
Barcelona (Spain)	1–5	(France) Paris Saint-Germain	1–3	0–2
Manchester City (England)	2–3	(France) Lyon	1–3	1–0

=== Matches ===
22 April 2017
18:00

Barcelona (Spain)	1–3	(France) Paris Saint-Germain
Latorre 89'	Report	Delie 26'; Cristiane 36'; Cruz 53'

Mini Estadi, Barcelona
Attendance: 10,352
Referee: Teodora Albon (Romania)
29 April 2017
17:00

Paris Saint-Germain (France)	2–0	(Spain) Barcelona
Delannoy 55' (pen.); Diéguez 61' (o.g.)	Report

Parc des Princes, Paris
Attendance: 19,192
Referee: Jana Adámková (Czech Republic)

Paris Saint-Germain won 5–1 on aggregate.

22 April 2017
15:00

Manchester City (England)	1–3	(France) Lyon
Asllani 10'	Report	Kumagai 2' (pen.); Marozsán 16'; Le Sommer 68'

Academy Stadium, Manchester
Attendance: 3,548
Referee: Katalin Kulcsár (Hungary)
29 April 2017
20:45

Lyon (France)	0–1	(England) Manchester City
	Report	Lloyd 57'

Parc Olympique Lyonnais, Décines
Attendance: 19,214
Referee: Esther Staubli (Switzerland)

Lyon won 3–2 on aggregate.

== Final ==
The final was played on 1 June 2017 at the Cardiff City Stadium in Cardiff, Wales. The "home" team (for administrative purposes) was determined by an additional draw held after the quarter-final and semi-final draws.

1 June 2017
20:45 (19:45 UTC+1)

Lyon (France)	0–0 (a.e.t.)	(France) Paris Saint-Germain
	Report
Penalties
Majri (penalty scored); Le Sommer (penalty missed); Renard (penalty scored); Mbock (penalty scored); Kumagai (penalty scored); Marozsán (penalty scored); Abily (penalty scored); Bouhaddi (penalty scored)	7–6	(penalty scored) Cristiane; (penalty scored) Delannoy; (penalty missed) Geyoro; (penalty scored) Delie; (penalty scored) Formiga; (penalty scored) Boquete; (penalty scored) Lawrence; (penalty missed) Kiedrzynek

Cardiff City Stadium, Cardiff
Attendance: 22,433
Referee: Bibiana Steinhaus (Germany)
