= 2017 UEFA Women's Champions League final =

2017 UEFA Women's Champions League Final
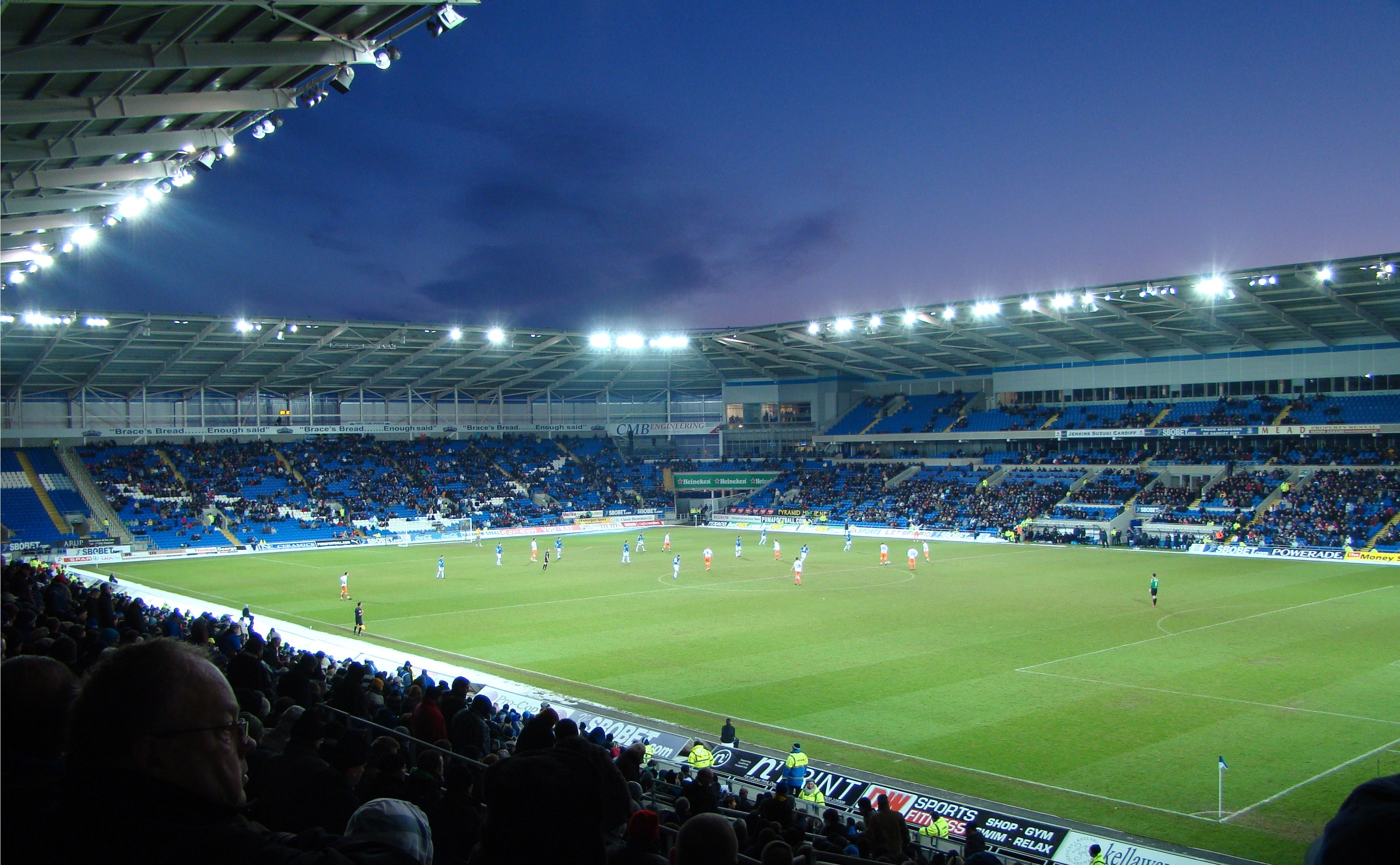
- The Cardiff City Stadium in Cardiff hosted the final
- Event: 2016–17 UEFA Women's Champions League
Lyon	Paris Saint-Germain
(France)	(France)
0	0
- After extra time Lyon won 7–6 on penalties
- Date: 1 June 2017
- Venue: Cardiff City Stadium, Cardiff
- Player of the Match: Dzsenifer Marozsán (Lyon)
- Referee: Bibiana Steinhaus (Germany)
- Attendance: 22,433
- Weather: Clear night 17 °C (63 °F); 73% humidity

The 2017 UEFA Women's Champions League Final was the final match of the 2016–17 UEFA Women's Champions League, the 16th season of Europe's premier women's club football tournament organised by UEFA, and the eighth season since it was renamed from the UEFA Women's Cup to the UEFA Women's Champions League. It was played at the Cardiff City Stadium in Cardiff, Wales, on 1 June 2017, between two French sides Lyon and Paris Saint-Germain.

Lyon won the final 7–6 on penalties after a goalless draw, giving them their fourth title, equalling Frankfurt's record, and became the first team to retain the title twice.

== Teams ==
In the following table, finals until 2009 were in the UEFA Women's Cup era, since 2010 were in the UEFA Women's Champions League era.

Team	Previous finals appearances (bold indicates winners)
(France) Lyon	5 (2010, **2011**, **2012**, 2013, **2016**)
(France) Paris Saint-Germain	1 (2015)

== Venue ==
The Cardiff City Stadium was announced as the final venue on 30 June 2015, following the decision of the UEFA Executive Committee meeting in Prague, Czech Republic to award the men's and women's Champions League finals to Cardiff.

== Background ==
The final was the first all-French final and the first featuring teams from the same country since two German teams met in the 2006 final, as well as the first not to feature German teams since the 2007 final and the first ever not to feature either German or Swedish teams.

This was Lyon's sixth final after winning in 2011, 2012 and 2016 and losing in 2010 and 2013, while this was Paris Saint-Germain's second final after losing in 2015.

== Route to the final ==
Note: In all results below, the score of the finalist is given first (H: home; A: away).

(France) Lyon				Round	(France) Paris Saint-Germain			
Opponent	Agg.	1st leg	2nd leg	Knockout phase	Opponent	Agg.	1st leg	2nd leg
(Norway) Avaldsnes IL	10–2	5–2 (A)	5–0 (H)	Round of 32	(Norway) Lillestrøm SK	5–4	1–3 (A)	4–1 (H)
(Switzerland) Zürich	17–0	8–0 (H)	9–0 (A)	Round of 16	(Kazakhstan) BIIK Kazygurt	7–1	3–0 (A)	4–1 (H)
(Germany) Wolfsburg	2–1	2–0 (A)	0–1 (H)	Quarter-finals	(Germany) Bayern Munich	4–1	0–1 (A)	4–0 (H)
(England) Manchester City	3–2	3–1 (A)	0–1 (H)	Semi-finals	(Spain) Barcelona	5–1	3–1 (A)	2–0 (H)

== Pre-match ==
=== Ambassador ===
The ambassador for the final was former Welsh international player Jayne Ludlow, who won the UEFA Women's Cup in 2007 with Arsenal.

=== Ticketing ===
Tickets were available on sale for £6 (adults) and £3 (children 16 and under).

== Match ==
=== Officials ===
German referee Bibiana Steinhaus was announced as the final referee by UEFA on 12 May 2017.

=== Details ===
The "home" team (for administrative purposes) was determined by an additional draw held after the quarter-final and semi-final draws, which was held on 25 November 2016 at UEFA headquarters in Nyon, Switzerland.

1 June 2017
19:45 UTC+1

Lyon (France)	0–0 (a.e.t.)	(France) Paris Saint-Germain
	Report
Penalties
Majri (penalty scored); Le Sommer (penalty missed); Renard (penalty scored); Mbock (penalty scored); Kumagai (penalty scored); Marozsán (penalty scored); Abily (penalty scored); Bouhaddi (penalty scored)	7–6	(penalty scored) Cristiane; (penalty scored) Delannoy; (penalty missed) Geyoro; (penalty scored) Delie; (penalty scored) Formiga; (penalty scored) Boquete; (penalty scored) Lawrence; (penalty missed) Kiedrzynek

Cardiff City Stadium, Cardiff
Attendance: 22,433
Referee: Bibiana Steinhaus (Germany)

**Lyon**	**Paris Saint-Germain**

GK	16	(France) Sarah Bouhaddi
RB	29	(France) Griedge Mbock Bathy
CB	21	(Canada) Kadeisha Buchanan
CB	3	(France) Wendie Renard (c)
LB	7	(France) Amel Majri
CM	5	(Japan) Saki Kumagai	(yellow card) 66'
CM	23	(France) Camille Abily
RW	9	(France) Eugénie Le Sommer
AM	10	(Germany) Dzsenifer Marozsán
LW	31	(United States) Alex Morgan		(substituted off) 23'
CF	14	(Norway) Ada Hegerberg		(substituted off) 60'
Substitutes:
GK	30	(France) Méline Gérard
DF	26	(Germany) Josephine Henning
MF	8	(France) Jessica Houara
MF	18	(France) Claire Lavogez			(substituted on) 107'
MF	27	(Sweden) Caroline Seger
FW	12	(France) Élodie Thomis		(substituted on) 23'	(substituted off) 107'
FW	23	(Germany) Pauline Bremer		(substituted on) 60'
Manager:
(France) Gérard Prêcheur

GK	1	(Poland) Katarzyna Kiedrzynek
CB	26	(France) Grace Geyoro
CB	5	(France) Sabrina Delannoy
CB	14	(Spain) Irene Paredes
DM	28	(Costa Rica) Shirley Cruz (c)		(substituted off) 80'
CM	7	(France) Aminata Diallo	(yellow card) 55'	(substituted off) 57'
CM	24	(Brazil) Formiga
RW	17	(France) Eve Perisset		(substituted off) 90+4'
LW	12	(Canada) Ashley Lawrence
CF	10	(Brazil) Cristiane
CF	18	(France) Marie-Laure Delie
Substitutes:
GK	16	(Netherlands) Loes Geurts
DF	3	(France) Laure Boulleau
DF	4	(France) Laura Georges	(yellow card) 81'	(substituted on) 80'
DF	20	(France) Perle Morroni	(yellow card) 115'	(substituted on) 90+4'
MF	19	(France) Lina Boussaha
MF	21	(Spain) Verónica Boquete		(substituted on) 57'
MF	22	(France) Sana Daoudi
Manager:
(France) Patrice Lair

Player of the Match:
Dzsenifer Marozsán (Lyon)

Assistant referees:
Christina Biehl (Germany)
Katrin Rafalski (Germany)
Fourth official:
Riem Hussein (Germany)
Reserve official:
Ella De Vries (Belgium)

**Match rules**

- 90 minutes.
- 30 minutes of extra time if necessary.
- Penalty shoot-out if scores still level.
- Seven named substitutes, of which up to three may be used.

=== Statistics ===
Statistic	Lyon	Paris Saint-Germain
Goals scored	0	0
Total shots	16	8
Shots on target	9	4
Saves	4	9
Ball possession	56%	44%
Corner kicks	3	4
Fouls committed	20	19
Offsides	1	3
Yellow cards	1	3
Red cards	0	0

== See also ==
- 2016–17 Olympique Lyonnais Féminin season
- 2017 UEFA Champions League final
- 2017 UEFA Europa League final
