= 2016–17 UEFA Women's Champions League =

16th edition of the European women's club football championship organized by UEFA

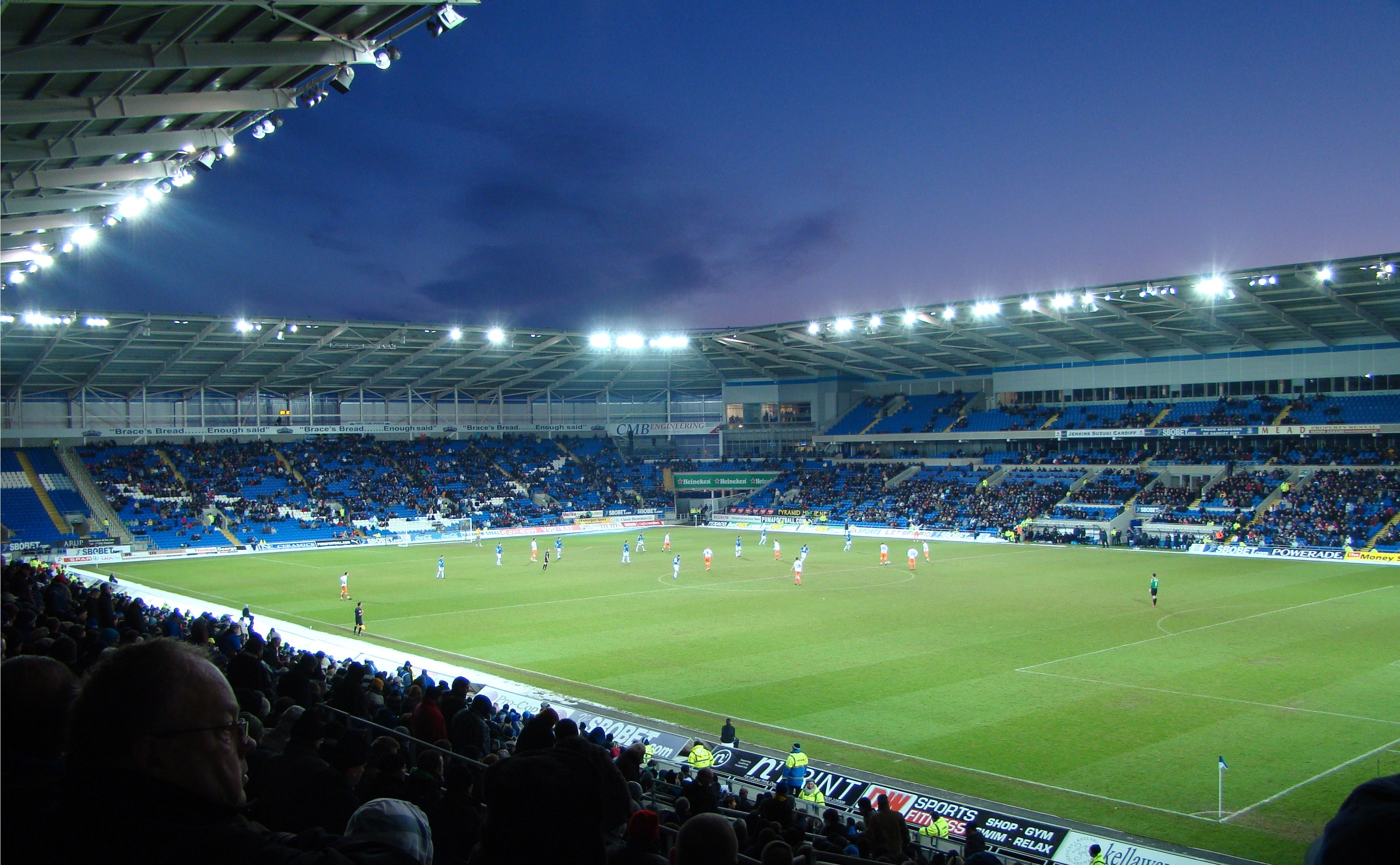
- The Cardiff City Stadium in Cardiff hosted the final.

Tournament details
- Dates: Qualifying round: 23–28 August 2016; Knockout phase: 5 October 2016 – 1 June 2017
- Teams: Knockout phase: 32; Total: 59 (from 47 associations)

Final positions
- Champions: (France) Lyon (4th title)
- Runners-up: (France) Paris Saint-Germain

Tournament statistics
- Matches played: 115
- Goals scored: 452 (3.93 per match)
- Attendance: 228,386 (1,986 per match)
- Top scorer(s): (Hungary) Zsanett Jakabfi (Netherlands) Vivianne Miedema; 8 goals each

The 2016–17 UEFA Women's Champions League was the 16th edition of the European women's club football championship organised by UEFA, and the 8th edition since being rebranded as the UEFA Women's Champions League.

The final was held at the Cardiff City Stadium in Cardiff, Wales on 1 June 2017, two days before the final of the men's tournament played at the Millennium Stadium.

Lyon were the defending champions, and successfully defended their title after defeating Paris Saint-Germain in the final 7–6 on penalties after a goalless draw, and equalled Frankfurt's record of four European titles.

== Expansion ==
The tournament was expanded such that the top 12 national associations (instead of the previous top 8) in the rankings were allowed to enter two teams in the competition.

The change has been criticized, as it broadens the tournament but doesn't add teams from top countries. The lack of an increase in prize-money also has been criticized. For the first time the clubs receive money for flights to away games. The amount increases from €12,000 over €17,000 to €20,000 based on flight time.

== Association team allocation ==
A total of 59 teams from 47 of the 55 UEFA member associations participated in the 2016–17 UEFA Women's Champions League, which was a record number of entries. The ranking based on the UEFA Women's Champions League association coefficient is used to determine the number of participating teams for each association:

- Associations 1–12 each have two teams qualify.
- All other associations, should they enter, each have one team qualify.
- The winners of the 2015–16 UEFA Women's Champions League were given an additional entry if they do not qualify for the 2016–17 UEFA Women's Champions League through their domestic league. Since the title holders Lyon qualified through their domestic league, the additional entry for the Champions League title holders was not necessary for this season.

=== Association ranking ===
For the 2016–17 UEFA Women's Champions League, the associations were allocated places according to their 2015 UEFA Women's Champions League association coefficient, which takes into account their performance in European competitions from 2010–11 to 2014–15.

Scotland for the first time receive two entries in the UEFA Women's Champions League.

Rank	Association	Coeff.	Teams
1	Germany	96.000	2
2	France	76.000	2
3	Sweden	61.500	2
4	England	58.000	2
5	Russia	44.000	2
6	Spain	41.000	2
7	Denmark	39.000	2
8	Italy	35.000	2
9	Austria	32.500	2
10	(Czech Republic) Czech Republic	32.000	2
11	Scotland	29.000	2
12	Norway	27.500	2
13	Switzerland	27.000	1
14	Cyprus	19.000	1
15	Poland	18.500	1
16	Kazakhstan	18.000	1
17	Netherlands	17.000	1
18	Iceland	17.000	1
19	Belgium	17.000	1

Rank	Association	Coeff.	Teams
20	Hungary	15.500	1
21	Serbia	14.000	1
22	Romania	14.000	1
23	Finland	13.000	1
24	Lithuania	11.000	1
25	(Republic of Ireland) Republic of Ireland	11.000	1
26	Turkey	11.000	1
27	Ukraine	11.000	1
28	Belarus	11.000	1
29	Greece	10.500	1
30	Slovenia	10.000	1
31	Portugal	9.500	1
32	(Bosnia and Herzegovina) Bosnia and Herzegovina	9.000	1
33	Croatia	8.000	1
34	Israel	8.000	1
35	Bulgaria	6.500	1
36	Slovakia	6.500	1
37	Estonia	5.000	1

Rank	Association	Coeff.	Teams
38	(Faroe Islands) Faroe Islands	4.000	1
39	Wales	3.000	1
40	(North Macedonia) Macedonia	3.000	1
41	(Northern Ireland) Northern Ireland	2.000	1
42	Albania	1.500	1
43	Montenegro	1.000	1
44	Moldova	0.500	1
45	Malta	0.000	1
46	Latvia	0.000	1
47	Luxembourg	0.000	0 (DNE)
48	(Georgia (country)) Georgia	0.000	0 (DNE)
(NR)	Kosovo	0.000	1
(NR)	Andorra	0.000	0 (DNE)
(NR)	Armenia	0.000	0 (DNE)
(NR)	Azerbaijan	0.000	0 (DNE)
(NR)	Gibraltar	0.000	0 (DNE)
(NR)	Liechtenstein	0.000	0 (DNE)
(NR)	(San Marino) San Marino	0.000	0 (DNE)

Notes

- (TH) – Additional berth for title holders
- (DNE) – Did not enter
- (NR) – No rank (association did not enter in the five seasons used for computing coefficients)

=== Distribution ===
The format of the competition remains unchanged from previous years, starting from the qualifying round, which is played as mini-tournaments with four teams in each group, followed by the knockout phase starting from the round of 32, which is played as home-and-away two-legged ties except for the one-match final.

Unlike the men's Champions League, not every association enters a team, and so the exact number of teams in each round (qualifying round and round of 32) can not be determined until the full entry list is known. In general, the title holders, the champions of the top 12 associations, plus the runners-up of highest-ranked associations (exact number depending on the number of entries) receive a bye to the round of 32. All other teams (runners-up of lowest-ranked associations plus champions of associations starting from 13th) enter the qualifying round, with the group winners plus a maximum of two best runners-up advancing to the round of 32 to join the direct qualifiers.

With 59 entries for this season, the lowest-ranked 36 teams enter the qualifying round (9 groups), with only the 9 group winners advancing to the round of 32 to join the 23 direct qualifiers.

=== Teams ===
The following list the teams that qualified and entered this season's competition. Here CH denotes the national champion, RU the national runner-up. Entries from 49 associations were possible. Three associations have no current league (Azerbaijan, Liechtenstein, San Marino). Azerbaijan only has junior leagues and teams from Liechtenstein play in the Swiss leagues. Gibraltar's league is only nine-a-side for 2015/16 and Andorra's is only five-a-side. Thus they are ineligible as well. Armenia has a regular league with an 11-a-side champion crowned for autumn and summer, but hasn't registered for European competition the last years. Also Georgia and Luxembourg did not enter a team. It's the first time a club (men or women) from Kosovo enters a UEFA competition.

Round of 32 (Champions from associations 1–12 + Runners-up from associations 1–11)
(Germany) Bayern Munich (CH)	(Germany) Wolfsburg (RU)	(France) Lyon^{TH} (CH)	(France) Paris Saint-Germain (RU)
(Sweden) Rosengård (CH)	(Sweden) Eskilstuna United DFF (RU)	(England) Chelsea (CH)	(England) Manchester City (RU)
(Russia) Zvezda Perm (CH)	(Russia) Rossiyanka (RU)	(Spain) Athletic Club (CH)	(Spain) Barcelona (RU)
(Denmark) Fortuna Hjørring (CH)	(Denmark) Brøndby (RU)	(Italy) Brescia (CH)	(Italy) AGSM Verona (RU)
(Austria) St. Pölten-Spratzern (CH)	(Austria) Sturm Graz (RU)	(Czech Republic) Slavia Praha (CH)	(Czech Republic) Sparta Praha (RU)
(Scotland) Glasgow City (CH)	(Scotland) Hibernian (RU)	(Norway) Lillestrøm SK (CH)	
Qualifying round (Runners-up from associations 12 + Champions from associations 13–55)
(Norway) Avaldsnes IL (RU)	(Switzerland) Zürich (CH)	(Cyprus) Apollon Limassol (CH)	(Poland) Medyk Konin (CH)
(Kazakhstan) BIIK Kazygurt (CH)	(Netherlands) Twente (CH)	(Iceland) Breiðablik (CH)	(Belgium) Standard Liège (CH)
(Hungary) Ferencváros (CH)	(Serbia) Spartak Subotica (CH)	(Romania) Olimpia Cluj (CH)	(Finland) PK-35 Vantaa (CH)
(Lithuania) Gintra Universitetas (CH)	(Republic of Ireland) Wexford Youths (CH)	(Turkey) Konak Belediyespor (CH)	(Ukraine) Zhytlobud Kharkiv (CH)
(Belarus) FC Minsk (CH)	(Greece) PAOK (CH)	(Slovenia) Pomurje (CH)	(Portugal) CF Benfica (CH)
(Bosnia and Herzegovina) SFK 2000 (CH)	(Croatia) Osijek (CH)	(Israel) Ramat HaSharon (CH)	(Bulgaria) NSA Sofia (CH)
(Slovakia) Slovan Bratislava (CH)	(Estonia) Pärnu JK (CH)	(Faroe Islands) KÍ Klaksvík (CH)	(Wales) Cardiff Met. LFC (CH)
(North Macedonia) ŽFK Dragon 2014 (CH)	(Northern Ireland) Newry City (CH)	(Albania) Vllaznia (CH)	(Montenegro) Breznica (CH)
(Moldova) ARF Criuleni (CH)	(Malta) Hibernians (CH)	(Latvia) Rīgas FS (CH)	(Kosovo) Hajvalia (CH)

== Round and draw dates ==
UEFA has scheduled the competition as follows (all draws are held at the UEFA headquarters in Nyon, Switzerland).

Round	Draw	First leg	Second leg
Qualifying round	24 June 2016	23–28 August 2016	
Round of 32	1 September 2016	5–6 October 2016	12–13 October 2016
Round of 16	17 October 2016	9–10 November 2016	16–17 November 2016
Quarter-finals	25 November 2016	22–23 March 2017	29–30 March 2017
Semi-finals	25 November 2016	22–23 April 2017	29–30 April 2017
Final	25 November 2016	1 June 2017 at Cardiff City Stadium, Cardiff	

== Qualifying round ==
The draw was held on 24 June 2016, 13:30 CEST, at the UEFA headquarters in Nyon, Switzerland. The 36 teams were allocated into four seeding positions based on their UEFA club coefficients at the beginning of the season. They were drawn into nine groups of four containing one team from each of the four seeding positions. First, the nine teams which were pre-selected as hosts were drawn from their own designated pot and allocated to their respective group as per their seeding positions. Next, the remaining 27 teams were drawn from their respective pot which were allocated according to their seeding positions.

In each group, teams play against each other in a round-robin mini-tournament at the pre-selected hosts. The nine group winners advance to the round of 32 to join the 23 teams which qualified directly. The matchdays are 23, 25 and 28 August 2016.

Tiebreakers
The teams are ranked according to points (3 points for a win, 1 point for a draw, 0 points for a loss). If two or more teams are equal on points on completion of the group matches, the following criteria are applied in the order given to determine the rankings (regulations Articles 14.01 and 14.02):
1. higher number of points obtained in the group matches played among the teams in question;
2. superior goal difference from the group matches played among the teams in question;
3. higher number of goals scored in the group matches played among the teams in question;
4. if, after having applied criteria 1 to 3, teams still have an equal ranking, criteria 1 to 3 are reapplied exclusively to the matches between the teams in question to determine their final rankings. If this procedure does not lead to a decision, criteria 5 to 9 apply;
5. superior goal difference in all group matches;
6. higher number of goals scored in all group matches;
7. if only two teams have the same number of points, and they are tied according to criteria 1 to 6 after having met in the last round of the group, their ranking is determined by a penalty shoot-out (this criterion is not used if more than two teams have the same number of points, or if the rankings of the two teams are not relevant for which team qualifies for the next stage).
8. lower disciplinary points total based only on yellow and red cards received in all group matches (red card = 3 points, yellow card = 1 point, expulsion for two yellow cards in one match = 3 points);
9. higher club coefficient.

=== Group 1 ===
Pos	Team	Pld	W	D	L	GF	GA	GD	Pts	Qualification	LIM	PAO	HAJ	KLA
1	(Cyprus) Apollon Limassol (H)	3	2	1	0	9	3	+6	7	Knockout phase	—	—	1–0	5–0
2	(Greece) PAOK	3	0	3	0	5	5	0	3		3–3	—	1–1	—
3	(Kosovo) Hajvalia	3	0	2	1	2	3	−1	2		—	—	—	1–1
4	(Faroe Islands) KÍ Klaksvík	3	0	2	1	2	7	−5	2		—	1–1	—	—

Source: UEFA
(H) Hosts

=== Group 2 ===
Pos	Team	Pld	W	D	L	GF	GA	GD	Pts	Qualification	MIN	LIE	OSI	DRA
1	(Belarus) FC Minsk	3	3	0	0	17	1	+16	9	Knockout phase	—	—	5–0	—
2	(Belgium) Standard Liège	3	1	1	1	13	4	+9	4		1–3	—	—	11–0
3	(Croatia) Osijek (H)	3	1	1	1	15	7	+8	4		—	1–1	—	14–1
4	(North Macedonia) ŽFK Dragon 2014	3	0	0	3	1	34	−33	0		0–9	—	—	—

Source: UEFA
(H) Hosts

=== Group 3 ===
Pos	Team	Pld	W	D	L	GF	GA	GD	Pts	Qualification	BRE	SUB	CAR	SOF
1	(Iceland) Breiðablik	3	2	1	0	14	1	+13	7	Knockout phase	—	—	—	5–0
2	(Serbia) Spartak Subotica	3	2	1	0	6	3	+3	7		1–1	—	3–2	—
3	(Wales) Cardiff Met. (H)	3	1	0	2	6	11	−5	3		0–8	—	—	—
4	(Bulgaria) NSA Sofia	3	0	0	3	0	11	−11	0		—	0–2	0–4	—

Source: UEFA
(H) Hosts

=== Group 4 ===
Pos	Team	Pld	W	D	L	GF	GA	GD	Pts	Qualification	KON	CLU	PÄR	BRE
1	(Poland) Medyk Konin (H)	3	3	0	0	13	1	+12	9	Knockout phase	—	3–1	—	9–0
2	(Romania) Olimpia Cluj	3	2	0	1	18	4	+14	6		—	—	7–1	10–0
3	(Estonia) Pärnu JK	3	0	1	2	3	10	−7	1		0–1	—	—	—
4	(Montenegro) Breznica	3	0	1	2	2	21	−19	1		—	—	2–2	—

Source: UEFA
(H) Hosts

=== Group 5 ===
Pos	Team	Pld	W	D	L	GF	GA	GD	Pts	Qualification	ZÜR	POM	BRA	VLL
1	(Switzerland) Zürich	3	3	0	0	11	1	+10	9	Knockout phase	—	—	3–1	3–0
2	(Slovenia) Pomurje (H)	3	2	0	1	10	8	+2	6		0–5	—	—	6–1
3	(Slovakia) Slovan Bratislava	3	1	0	2	5	8	−3	3		—	2–4	—	—
4	(Albania) Vllaznia	3	0	0	3	2	11	−9	0		—	—	1–2	—

Source: UEFA
(H) Hosts

=== Group 6 ===
Pos	Team	Pld	W	D	L	GF	GA	GD	Pts	Qualification	SFK	HaS	KHA	RIG
1	(Bosnia and Herzegovina) SFK 2000 (H)	3	2	1	0	6	2	+4	7	Knockout phase	—	1–0	—	3–0
2	(Israel) Ramat HaSharon	3	2	0	1	5	1	+4	6		—	—	1–0	—
3	(Ukraine) Zhytlobud Kharkiv	3	1	1	1	4	3	+1	4		2–2	—	—	2–0
4	(Latvia) Rīgas FS	3	0	0	3	0	9	−9	0		—	0–4	—	—

Source: UEFA
(H) Hosts

=== Group 7 ===
Pos	Team	Pld	W	D	L	GF	GA	GD	Pts	Qualification	KAZ	GIN	WEX	CRI
1	(Kazakhstan) BIIK Kazygurt	3	3	0	0	9	1	+8	9	Knockout phase	—	—	3–1	3–0
2	(Lithuania) Gintra Universitetas	3	2	0	1	15	4	+11	6		0–3	—	—	13–0
3	(Republic of Ireland) Wexford Youths (H)	3	0	1	2	2	5	−3	1		—	1–2	—	—
4	(Moldova) ARF Criuleni	3	0	1	2	0	16	−16	1		—	—	0–0	—

Source: UEFA
(H) Hosts

=== Group 8 ===
Pos	Team	Pld	W	D	L	GF	GA	GD	Pts	Qualification	AVA	BEN	VAN	NEW
1	(Norway) Avaldsnes IL	3	3	0	0	19	1	+18	9	Knockout phase	—	—	2–0	11–0
2	(Portugal) CF Benfica	3	2	0	1	8	7	+1	6		1–6	—	—	—
3	(Finland) PK-35 Vantaa (H)	3	1	0	2	3	4	−1	3		—	1–2	—	2–0
4	(Northern Ireland) Newry City	3	0	0	3	0	18	−18	0		—	0–5	—	—

Source: UEFA
(H) Hosts

=== Group 9 ===
Pos	Team	Pld	W	D	L	GF	GA	GD	Pts	Qualification	TWE	FER	KON	HIB
1	(Netherlands) Twente (H)	3	3	0	0	17	3	+14	9	Knockout phase	—	2–1	—	9–0
2	(Hungary) Ferencváros	3	2	0	1	7	2	+5	6		—	—	2–0	—
3	(Turkey) Konak Belediyespor	3	1	0	2	7	8	−1	3		2–6	—	—	5–0
4	(Malta) Hibernians	3	0	0	3	0	18	−18	0		—	0–4	—	—

Source: UEFA
(H) Hosts

== Knockout phase ==
In the knockout phase, teams play against each other over two legs on a home-and-away basis, except for the one-match final. The mechanism of the draws for each round is as follows:

- In the draw for the round of 32, the sixteen teams with the highest UEFA coefficients are seeded (with the title holders being the automatic top seed), and the other sixteen teams are unseeded. The seeded teams are drawn against the unseeded teams, with the seeded teams hosting the second leg. Teams from the same association cannot be drawn against each other.
- In the draw for the round of 16, the eight teams with the highest UEFA coefficients are seeded (with the title holders being the automatic top seed should they qualify), and the other eight teams are unseeded. The seeded teams are drawn against the unseeded teams, with the order of legs decided by draw. Teams from the same association cannot be drawn against each other.
- In the draws for the quarter-finals onwards, there are no seedings, and teams from the same association can be drawn against each other.

=== Bracket ===
Round of 32
(Poland) Medyk Konin	4	2	6
(Italy) Brescia (a)	3	3	6
(Spain) Athletic Club	2	1	3
(Denmark) Fortuna Hjørring (a.e.t.)	1	3	4
(England) Manchester City	2	4	6
(Russia) Zvezda Perm	0	0	0
(Austria) St. Pölten-Spratzern	0	2	2
(Denmark) Brøndby	2	2	4
(Sweden) Eskilstuna United DFF	1	2	3
(Scotland) Glasgow City	0	1	1
(England) Chelsea	0	1	1
(Germany) Wolfsburg	3	1	4
(Norway) Avaldsnes IL	2	0	2
(France) Lyon	5	5	10
(Austria) Sturm Graz	0	0	0
(Switzerland) Zürich	6	3	9
(Cyprus) Apollon Limassol	1	2	3
(Czech Republic) Slavia Praha	1	3	4
(Iceland) Breiðablik	0	0	0
(Sweden) Rosengård	1	0	1
(Belarus) FC Minsk	0	1	1
(Spain) Barcelona	3	2	5
(Netherlands) Twente	2	3	5
(Czech Republic) Sparta Praha	0	1	1
(Scotland) Hibernian	0	1	1
(Germany) Bayern Munich	6	4	10
(Bosnia and Herzegovina) SFK 2000	0	1	1
(Russia) Rossiyanka	0	2	2
(Kazakhstan) BIIK Kazygurt	3	1	4
(Italy) AGSM Verona	1	1	2
(Norway) Lillestrøm SK	3	1	4
(France) Paris Saint-Germain	1	4	5

Round of 16
(Italy) Brescia	0	1	1
(Denmark) Fortuna Hjørring	1	3	4
(England) Manchester City	1	1	2
(Denmark) Brøndby	0	1	1
(Sweden) Eskilstuna United DFF	1	0	1
(Germany) Wolfsburg	5	3	8
(France) Lyon	8	9	17
(Switzerland) Zürich	0	0	0
(Czech Republic) Slavia Praha	1	0	1
(Sweden) Rosengård	3	3	6
(Spain) Barcelona	1	4	5
(Netherlands) Twente	0	0	0
(Germany) Bayern Munich	4	4	8
(Russia) Rossiyanka	0	0	0
(Kazakhstan) BIIK Kazygurt	0	1	1
(France) Paris Saint-Germain	3	4	7

Quarter-finals
(Denmark) Fortuna Hjørring	0	0	0
(England) Manchester City	1	1	2
(Germany) Wolfsburg	0	1	1
(France) Lyon	2	0	2
(Sweden) Rosengård	0	0	0
(Spain) Barcelona	1	2	3
(Germany) Bayern Munich	1	0	1
(France) Paris Saint-Germain	0	4	4

Semi-finals
(England) Manchester City	1	1	2
(France) Lyon	3	0	3
(Spain) Barcelona	1	0	1
(France) Paris Saint-Germain	3	2	5

Final
(France) Lyon (p)	0 (7)
(France) Paris Saint-Germain	0 (6)

=== Round of 32 ===
The draw for the round of 32 was held on 1 September 2016, 13:30 CEST, at the UEFA headquarters in Nyon, Switzerland. The first legs were played on 5 and 6 October, and the second legs on 12 and 13 October 2016.

Team 1	Agg.	Team 2	1st leg	2nd leg
Sturm Graz (Austria)	0–9	(Switzerland) Zürich	0–6	0–3
Breiðablik (Iceland)	0–1	(Sweden) Rosengård	0–1	0–0
Lillestrøm SK (Norway)	4–5	(France) Paris Saint-Germain	3–1	1–4
Avaldsnes IL (Norway)	2–10	(France) Lyon	2–5	0–5
Eskilstuna United DFF (Sweden)	3–1	(Scotland) Glasgow City	1–0	2–1
SFK 2000 (Bosnia and Herzegovina)	1–2	(Russia) Rossiyanka	0–0	1–2
Chelsea (England)	1–4	(Germany) Wolfsburg	0–3	1–1
Twente (Netherlands)	5–1	(Czech Republic) Sparta Praha	2–0	3–1
Apollon Limassol (Cyprus)	3–4	(Czech Republic) Slavia Praha	1–1	2–3
Athletic Club (Spain)	3–4	(Denmark) Fortuna Hjørring	2–1	1–3 (a.e.t.)
FC Minsk (Belarus)	1–5	(Spain) Barcelona	0–3	1–2
Medyk Konin (Poland)	6–6 (a)	(Italy) Brescia	4–3	2–3
Manchester City (England)	6–0	(Russia) Zvezda Perm	2–0	4–0
BIIK Kazygurt (Kazakhstan)	4–2	(Italy) AGSM Verona	3–1	1–1
Hibernian (Scotland)	1–10	(Germany) Bayern Munich	0–6	1–4
St. Pölten-Spratzern (Austria)	2–4	(Denmark) Brøndby	0–2	2–2

=== Round of 16 ===
The draw for the round of 16 was held on 17 October 2016, 13:30 CEST, at the UEFA headquarters in Nyon, Switzerland. The first legs were played on 9 and 10 November, and the second legs played on 16 and 17 November 2016.

Team 1	Agg.	Team 2	1st leg	2nd leg
BIIK Kazygurt (Kazakhstan)	1–7	(France) Paris Saint-Germain	0–3	1–4
Barcelona (Spain)	5–0	(Netherlands) Twente	1–0	4–0
Slavia Praha (Czech Republic)	1–6	(Sweden) Rosengård	1–3	0–3
Manchester City (England)	2–1	(Denmark) Brøndby	1–0	1–1
Brescia (Italy)	1–4	(Denmark) Fortuna Hjørring	0–1	1–3
Lyon (France)	17–0	(Switzerland) Zürich	8–0	9–0
Eskilstuna United DFF (Sweden)	1–8	(Germany) Wolfsburg	1–5	0–3
Bayern Munich (Germany)	8–0	(Russia) Rossiyanka	4–0	4–0

Notes

1. Order of legs reversed after original draw.

=== Quarter-finals ===
The draws for the quarter-finals and semi-finals was held on 25 November 2016, 13:30 CET, at the UEFA headquarters in Nyon, Switzerland. The first legs were played on 22 and 23 March, and the second legs on 29 and 30 March 2017.

Team 1	Agg.	Team 2	1st leg	2nd leg
Fortuna Hjørring (Denmark)	0–2	(England) Manchester City	0–1	0–1
Rosengård (Sweden)	0–3	(Spain) Barcelona	0–1	0–2
Wolfsburg (Germany)	1–2	(France) Lyon	0–2	1–0
Bayern Munich (Germany)	1–4	(France) Paris Saint-Germain	1–0	0–4

=== Semi-finals ===
The first legs were played on 22 April, and the second legs on 29 April 2017.

Team 1	Agg.	Team 2	1st leg	2nd leg
Barcelona (Spain)	1–5	(France) Paris Saint-Germain	1–3	0–2
Manchester City (England)	2–3	(France) Lyon	1–3	1–0

=== Final ===
The final was played on 1 June 2017 at the Cardiff City Stadium in Cardiff, Wales. The "home" team (for administrative purposes) was determined by an additional draw held after the quarter-final and semi-final draws.

1 June 2017
19:45 UTC+1

Lyon (France)	0–0 (a.e.t.)	(France) Paris Saint-Germain
	Report
Penalties
Majri (penalty scored); Le Sommer (penalty missed); Renard (penalty scored); Mbock (penalty scored); Kumagai (penalty scored); Marozsán (penalty scored); Abily (penalty scored); Bouhaddi (penalty scored)	7–6	(penalty scored) Cristiane; (penalty scored) Delannoy; (penalty missed) Geyoro; (penalty scored) Delie; (penalty scored) Formiga; (penalty scored) Boquete; (penalty scored) Lawrence; (penalty missed) Kiedrzynek

Cardiff City Stadium, Cardiff
Attendance: 22,433
Referee: Bibiana Steinhaus (Germany)

== Statistics ==
Qualifying goals count towards the topscorer award.

=== Top goalscorers ===
Rank	Player	Team	Goals		
Rank	Player	Team	Qual	Tourn	Total
1	(Hungary) Zsanett Jakabfi	(Germany) Wolfsburg	—	8	8
1	(Netherlands) Vivianne Miedema	(Germany) Bayern Munich	—	8	8
3	(Georgia (country)) Gulnara Gabelia	(Kazakhstan) BIIK Kazygurt	4	3	7
3	(Romania) Alexandra Lunca	(Romania) Olimpia Cluj	7	—	7
3	(Poland) Aleksandra Sikora	(Poland) Medyk Konin	5	2	7
6	(Brazil) Cristiane	(France) Paris Saint-Germain	—	6	6
6	(Norway) Hege Hansen	(Norway) Avaldsnes IL	5	1	6
6	(Switzerland) Fabienne Humm	(Switzerland) FC Zürich	3	3	6
6	(France) Eugénie Le Sommer	(France) Lyon	—	6	6
6	(Romania) Loredana Popa	(Romania) Olimpia Cluj	6	—	6

Source: UEFA

=== Squad of the season ===
The UEFA technical study group selected the following 18 players as the squad of the tournament:

Pos.	Player	Team
GK	(France) Sarah Bouhaddi	(France) Lyon
GK	(Poland) Katarzyna Kiedrzynek	(France) Paris Saint-Germain
DF	(England) Lucy Bronze	(England) Manchester City
DF	(Canada) Kadeisha Buchanan	(France) Lyon
DF	(France) Griedge Mbock Bathy	(France) Lyon
DF	(France) Wendie Renard	(France) Lyon
DF	(Canada) Ashley Lawrence	(France) Paris Saint-Germain
DF	(France) Eve Périsset	(France) Paris Saint-Germain
MF	(England) Jill Scott	(England) Manchester City
MF	(France) Camille Abily	(France) Lyon
MF	(Japan) Saki Kumagai	(France) Lyon
MF	(Germany) Dzsenifer Marozsán	(France) Lyon
MF	(France) Grace Geyoro	(France) Paris Saint-Germain
MF	(Denmark) Pernille Harder	(Germany) VfL Wolfsburg
FW	(Netherlands) Vivianne Miedema	(Germany) Bayern Munich
FW	(France) Eugénie Le Sommer	(France) Lyon
FW	(Brazil) Cristiane	(France) Paris Saint-Germain
FW	(Hungary) Zsanett Jakabfi	(Germany) VfL Wolfsburg

== See also ==
- 2016–17 UEFA Champions League
