= Bibiana Steinhaus =

German football referee

Bibiana Steinhaus-Webb
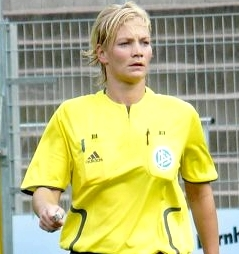
- Steinhaus-Webb in 2008
- Born: Bibiana Steinhaus; 24 March 1979 (age 47); Bad Lauterberg, West Germany
- Height: 1.81 m (5 ft 11 in)
- Other occupation: Police officer

Domestic
Years	League	Role
1999–2020	DFB	Referee
1999–2014	Frauen-Bundesliga	Referee
2007–2020	2. Bundesliga	Referee
2017–2020	Bundesliga	Referee

International
Years	League	Role
2005–2020	FIFA listed	Referee

Bibiana Steinhaus-Webb (née Steinhaus; born 24 March 1979) is a German football referee. She referees for MTV Engelbostel-Schulenburg of the Lower Saxony Football Association, but since October 2020 only as video assistant referee. She was a FIFA referee, and was ranked as a UEFA women's elite category referee.

== Refereeing career ==
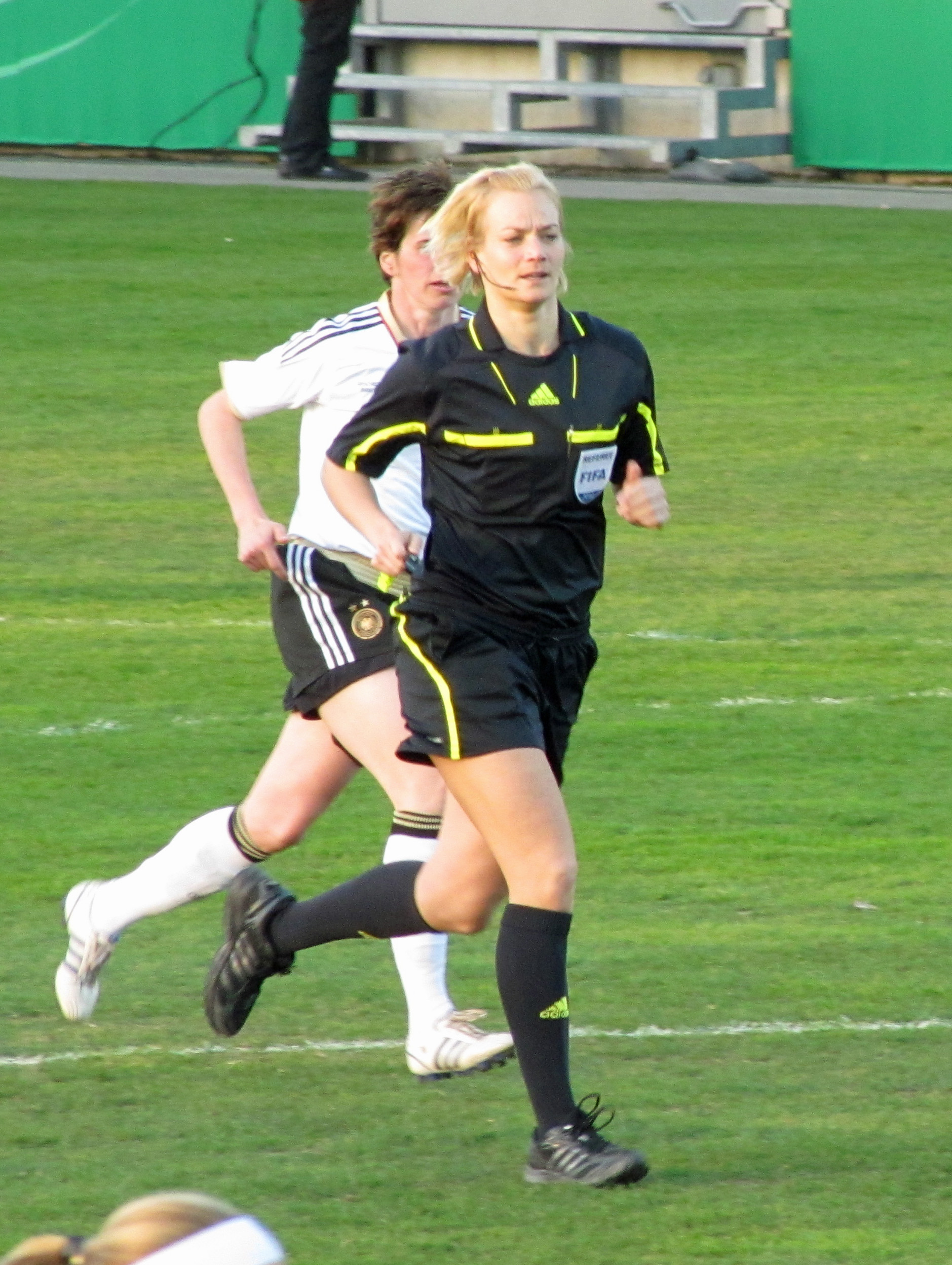
Steinhaus officiating Birgit Prinz's testimonial match in 2012.

Before becoming a referee like her father, Steinhaus played as a footballer for SV Bad Lauterberg.

Steinhaus became a referee for the club SV Bad Lauterberg and began in the Frauen-Bundesliga after receiving DFB certification in 1999, having taken professional courses since the age of 15. She moved to the Regionalliga in 2001 and was the main referee for the 2003 DFB-Pokal der Frauen Final between 1. FFC Frankfurt and FCR 2001 Duisburg in 2003. Steinhaus began refereeing in the men's 2. Bundesliga in 2007, making her the first female referee in German men's professional football. She was also selected for the 2008 FIFA U-20 Women's World Cup, UEFA Women's Euro 2009, and 2010 FIFA U-20 Women's World Cup. In 2016, she changed her affiliation to MTV Engelbostel-Schulenburg.

Steinhaus was one of the sixteen referees chosen for the 2011 FIFA Women's World Cup, where she officiated two group stage matches and the final between Japan and the United States. Steinhaus was selected to officiate the women's football gold medal match at the 2012 Summer Olympics, also between Japan and the United States.

On 12 May 2017, Steinhaus was chosen by UEFA as the referee for the 2017 UEFA Women's Champions League Final, played between Lyon and Paris Saint-Germain in Cardiff. One week later, she was promoted by the DFB to officiate in the top-level Bundesliga, for the 2017–18 season, making her the first female referee in the league's history. Steinhaus officiated her first Bundesliga match, a 1–1 draw between Hertha BSC and Werder Bremen, on 10 September 2017. Hertha, the hosts, offered promotional half-price "Bibiana tickets" to female fans. Steinhaus was named the female referee of the year by DFB in 2018.

Steinhaus has been the target of abuse and controversial incidents on several occasions, including a physical confrontation from Bayern Munich manager Pep Guardiola while serving as the fourth official in a 2014 match, and an accidental groping of her breast by a player in 2010. Fortuna Düsseldorf's Kerem Demirbay was suspended for five matches by his club after making a sexist comment towards Steinhaus, who had sent him off for a second yellow card. IRIB, the state broadcaster of Iran, cancelled their broadcast of a Bundesliga fixture in February 2019 due to Steinhaus being named as its head referee. The television channel had previously broadcast a match officiated by Steinhaus, but cut to crowd shots instead of using the close-up shots of Steinhaus in the normal feed.

Steinhaus was appointed to officiate the 2020 DFL-Supercup between Bayern Munich and Borussia Dortmund on 30 September 2020. She announced that the match would be the last of her refereeing career.

== Personal life ==
Steinhaus lives in Langenhagen, and is a trained police officer with the rank of Chief Inspector. She has been married to Englishman and fellow former referee Howard Webb since March 2021.

== List of major matches refereed ==
Date	Match	Tournament	Venue	Result	Ref
17 July 2011	Japan vs. United States	2011 FIFA Women's World Cup final	Waldstadion, Frankfurt	2–2 (a.e.t.; Japan won 3–1 on penalties)	
9 August 2012	United States vs. Japan	2012 Summer Olympics Women's Football final	Wembley Stadium, London	2–1	
1 June 2017	Lyon vs. Paris Saint-Germain	2017 UEFA Women's Champions League final	Cardiff City Stadium, Cardiff	0–0 (a.e.t.; Lyon won 7–6 on penalties)	

== Honours ==
- IFFHS World's Best Woman Referee: 2013, 2014, 2017, 2018
- IFFHS World's Best Woman Referee of the Decade 2011–2020
