= 2016–17 in Spanish football =

Football in Spain
- Season: 2016–17

Men's football
- La Liga: Real Madrid
- Segunda División: Levante
- Segunda División B: Cultural Leonesa
- Copa del Rey: Barcelona
- Copa Federación: Atlético Saguntino
- Supercopa: Barcelona

Women's football
- Primera División: Atlético Madrid
- Copa de la Reina: Barcelona

The 2016–17 season is the 115th season of competitive association football in Spain.

== Promotion and relegation ==
=== Pre-season ===
League	Promoted to league	Relegated from league
La Liga	Alavés; Leganés; Osasuna	Rayo Vallecano; Getafe; Levante
Segunda División	UCAM Murcia; Reus; Cádiz; Sevilla Atlético	Ponferradina; Llagostera; Albacete; Bilbao Athletic
Segunda División B	At. Mancha Real; At. Sanluqueño; Boiro; Caudal; Córdoba B; El Ejido; Extremadura; Gavà; Mallorca B; Mutilvera; Navalcarnero; Osasuna B; Palencia; Prat; Saguntino; SS Reyes; San Fernando; Zamudio	Almería B; Algeciras; Atlético Astorga; Cacereño; Compostela; Getafe B; Guadalajara; Huracán Valencia; Llosetense; Olímpic; Olot; Peña Sport; Pobla de Mafumet; Portugalete; Real Betis B; San Roque de Lepe; Sporting Gijón B; Talavera de la Reina
Primera División (women)	Real Betis; Tacuense	Oviedo Moderno; Collerense

== National teams ==
=== Spain national football team ===
==== Results and fixtures ====
===== 2016 =====
1 September 2016 Friendly	Belgium	0–2	Spain	Brussels, Belgium
20:45 CEST (UTC+02:00)		Report	Silva 34', 62' (pen.)	Stadium: King Baudouin Stadium; Attendance: 28,000; Referee: Benoît Bastien (France)

5 September 2016 2018 FIFA World Cup Q	Spain	8–0	Liechtenstein	León, Spain
20:45 CEST (UTC+02:00)	Costa 10', 66'; Roberto 55'; Silva 59', 90+1'; Vitolo 60'; Morata 82', 83'	Report		Stadium: Estadio Reino de León; Attendance: 12,139; Referee: Simon Lee Evans (Wales)

6 October 2016 2018 FIFA World Cup Q	Italy	1–1	Spain	Turin, Italy
20:45 CEST (UTC+02:00)	De Rossi 82' (pen.)	Report	Vitolo 55'	Stadium: Juventus Stadium; Attendance: 38,470; Referee: Felix Brych (Germany)

9 October 2016 2018 FIFA World Cup Q	Albania	0–2	Spain	Shkodër, Albania
20:45 CEST (UTC+02:00)		Report	Costa 55'; Nolito 63'	Stadium: Loro Boriçi Stadium; Attendance: 15,245; Referee: Bas Nijhuis (Netherlands)

12 November 2016 2018 FIFA World Cup Q	Spain	4–0	Macedonia	Granada, Spain
20:45 CET (UTC+01:00)	Velkovski 34' (o.g.); Vitolo 63'; Monreal 84'; Aduriz 85'	Report		Stadium: Estadio Los Cármenes; Referee: Robert Schörgenhofer (Austria)

15 November 2016 Friendly	England	2–2	Spain	London, England
21:00 CET (UTC+01:00)	Lallana 9' (pen.); Vardy 48'	Report	Aspas 89'; Isco 90+6'	Stadium: Wembley Stadium; Attendance: 83,716; Referee: Ovidiu Hațegan (Romania)

===== 2017 =====
24 March 2017 2018 FIFA World Cup Q	Spain	4–1	Israel	El Molinón, Gijón
20:45 (20:45 UTC+1)	Silva 13'; Vitolo 45+1'; Costa 51'; Isco 88'	Report (FIFA); Report (UEFA)	Refaelov 76'	Attendance: 20,321; Referee: Michael Oliver (England)

28 March 2017 Friendly	France	0–2	Spain	Stade de France, Saint-Denis
20:45 (20:45 UTC+2)		Report (UEFA)	Silva 68' (pen.); Deulofeu 77'	Referee: Felix Zwayer (Germany)

7 June 2017 Friendly	Spain	2–2	Colombia	Estadio Nueva Condomina, Murcia
20:30 (20:30 UTC+2)	Silva 22'; Morata 87'	Report (Goal.com)	Cardona 39'; Falcao 55'	Referee: Slavko Vinčić (Slovenia)

11 June 2017 2018 FIFA World Cup Q	Macedonia	1–2	Spain	Philip II Arena, Skopje
20:45 (20:45 UTC+2)	Ristovski 66'	Report (FIFA); Report (UEFA)	Silva 15'; Costa 27'	Referee: Paweł Gil (Poland)

==== Managerial changes ====
Outgoing manager	Manner of departure	Date of departure	Incoming manager	Date of appointment
(Spain) Vicente del Bosque	Retired	30 June 2016	(Spain) Julen Lopetegui	21 July 2016

===== 2018 FIFA World Cup qualification (UEFA) Group G =====
Pos	Team	Pld	W	D	L	GF	GA	GD	Pts	Qualification	Spain	Italy	Albania	Israel	North Macedonia	Liechtenstein
1	Spain	10	9	1	0	36	3	+33	28	Qualification to 2018 FIFA World Cup	—	3–0	3–0	4–1	4–0	8–0
2	Italy	10	7	2	1	21	8	+13	23	Advance to second round	1–1	—	2–0	1–0	1–1	5–0
3	Albania	10	4	1	5	10	13	−3	13		0–2	0–1	—	0–3	2–1	2–0
4	Israel	10	4	0	6	10	15	−5	12		0–1	1–3	0–3	—	0–1	2–1
5	Macedonia	10	3	2	5	15	15	0	11		1–2	2–3	1–1	1–2	—	4–0
6	Liechtenstein	10	0	0	10	1	39	−38	0		0–8	0–4	0–2	0–1	0–3	—

Source: FIFA
Rules for classification: Qualification tiebreakers

2018 FIFA World Cup qualification tiebreakers
In league format, the ranking of teams in each group was based on the following criteria (regulations Articles 20.6 and 20.7):
1. Points (3 points for a win, 1 point for a draw, 0 points for a loss)
2. Overall goal difference
3. Overall goals scored
4. Points in matches between tied teams
5. Goal difference in matches between tied teams
6. Goals scored in matches between tied teams
7. Away goals scored in matches between tied teams (if the tie was only between two teams in home-and-away league format)
8. Fair play points
  - first yellow card: minus 1 point
  - indirect red card (second yellow card): minus 3 points
  - direct red card: minus 4 points
  - yellow card and direct red card: minus 5 points
9. Drawing of lots by the FIFA Organising Committee

=== Spain women's national football team ===
==== Results and fixtures ====
===== 2016 =====
15 Sep 2016 (Netherlands) 2017 EC Q	Spain	13–0	Montenegro	(Spain) Las Rozas de Madrid
19:00	Boquete 2', 7', 45', 46'; Bermúdez 10', 20', 23', 52', 90+3'; Sampedro 16'; Corredera 25'; Losada 74'; Putellas 80'	Report		Stadium: La Ciudad del Fútbol; Referee: (Slovakia) Zuzana Valentová

20 Sep 2016 (Netherlands) 2017 EC Q	Spain	5–0	Finland	(Spain) Leganés
19:00	Torrejón 28'; Paredes 66' (pen.), 82'; Sampedro 88' (pen.); Hermoso 90+1'	Report		Stadium: Butarque; Attendance: 5,100; Referee: (Poland) Monika Mularczyk

25 Oct 2016 Friendly	Spain	1–2	England	(Spain) Guadalajara
18:00	Torrejón 19'		Torrejón 14' (o.g.); Houghton 17'	Stadium: Estadio Pedro Escartín; Attendance: 3,000; Referee: (Spain) Elia María Martínez

26 Nov 2016 Friendly	France	1–0	Spain	(France) Le Mans
21:00	Le Sommer 54'	Report		Stadium: MMArena; Attendance: 11,521; Referee: (Hungary) Gyöngyi Gaal

===== 2017 =====
1 Mar 2017 (Portugal) 2017 Algarve Cup	Japan	1–2	Spain	(Portugal) Parchal
14:45	Yokoyama 81'	Report	Meseguer 59'; O. García 72'	Stadium: Bela Vista Municipal Stadium; Referee: (Brazil) Edina Alves Batista

3 Mar 2017 (Portugal) 2017 Algarve Cup	Spain	3–0	Norway	(Portugal) Faro/Loulé
18:30	Thorisdottir 25' (o.g.); Hermoso 39'; O. García 42'	Report		Stadium: Estádio Algarve; Referee: (Argentina) Laura Fortunato

6 Mar 2017 (Portugal) 2017 Algarve Cup	Iceland	0–0	Spain	(Portugal) Vila Real de Santo António
14:45		Report		Stadium: VRSA Sports Complex; Referee: (Rwanda) Mukansanga Salima

8 Mar 2017 (Portugal) 2017 Algarve Cup	Spain	1–0	Canada	(Portugal) Faro/Loulé
18:30	Ouahabi 4'	Report		Stadium: Estádio Algarve; Referee: (Japan) Yoshimi Yamashita

8 Apr 2017 Friendly	Belgium	1–4	Spain	(Belgium) Eupen
15:00	Cayman 71'		Losada 34'; Vilas 42'; Hermoso 75' (pen.), 79'	Stadium: Kehrwegstadion; Referee: (France) Solen Dallongeville

19 Jul 2017 (Netherlands) 2017 EC GS	Spain	2–0	Portugal	(Netherlands) Doetinchem
18:00	Losada 23'; Sampedro 42'	Report		Stadium: De Vijverberg; Attendance: 3,100; Referee: (Sweden) Pernilla Larsson

23 Jul 2017 (Netherlands) 2017 EC GS	England	2–0	Spain	(Netherlands) Breda
20:45	Kirby 2'; Taylor 85'	Report		Stadium: Rat Verlegh Stadion; Attendance: 4,879; Referee: (Italy) Carina Vitulano

27 Jul 2017 (Netherlands) 2017 EC GS	Scotland	1–0	Spain	(Netherlands) Deventer
20:45	Weir 42'	Report		Stadium: De Adelaarshorst; Attendance: 4,840; Referee: (Czech Republic) Jana Adámková

30 Jul 2017 (Netherlands) 2017 EC QF	Austria	0–0 (5–3 p)	Spain	(Netherlands) Tilburg
18:00		Report		Stadium: Koning Willem II Stadion; Attendance: 3,488; Referee: (France) Stéphanie Frappart
	Penalties
	Feiersinger (penalty scored); Burger (penalty scored); Aschauer (penalty scored); Pinther (penalty scored); Puntigam (penalty scored)		(penalty scored) García; (penalty scored) Sampedro; (penalty missed) Meseguer; (penalty scored) Corredera

== FIFA competitions ==
=== 2016 FIFA Club World Cup ===
==== Semifinals ====
15 December 2016
19:30

América (Mexico)	0–2	(Spain) Real Madrid
	Report	Benzema 45+2'; Ronaldo 90+3'

International Stadium Yokohama, Yokohama
Attendance: 50,117
Referee: Enrique Cáceres (Paraguay)

==== Final ====
18 December 2016
19:30

Real Madrid (Spain)	4–2 (a.e.t.)	(Japan) Kashima Antlers
Benzema 9'; Ronaldo 60' (pen.), 98', 104'	Report	Shibasaki 44', 52'

International Stadium Yokohama, Yokohama
Attendance: 68,742
Referee: Janny Sikazwe (Zambia)

== UEFA competitions ==
=== 2016–17 UEFA Champions League ===
==== Play-off round ====
Team 1	Agg.	Team 2	1st leg	2nd leg
Villarreal (Spain)	1–3	(France) Monaco	1–2	0–1

==== Group stage ====
===== Group C =====
Pos	Team	Pld	W	D	L	GF	GA	GD	Pts	Qualification	BAR	MCI	BMG	CEL
1	(Spain) Barcelona	6	5	0	1	20	4	+16	15	Advance to knockout phase	—	4–0	4–0	7–0
2	(England) Manchester City	6	2	3	1	12	10	+2	9	Advance to knockout phase	3–1	—	4–0	1–1
3	(Germany) Borussia Mönchengladbach	6	1	2	3	5	12	−7	5	Transfer to Europa League	1–2	1–1	—	1–1
4	(Scotland) Celtic	6	0	3	3	5	16	−11	3		0–2	3–3	0–2	—

Source: UEFA

===== Group D =====
Pos	Team	Pld	W	D	L	GF	GA	GD	Pts	Qualification	ATM	BAY	RST	PSV
1	(Spain) Atlético Madrid	6	5	0	1	7	2	+5	15	Advance to knockout phase	—	1–0	2–1	2–0
2	(Germany) Bayern Munich	6	4	0	2	14	6	+8	12	Advance to knockout phase	1–0	—	5–0	4–1
3	(Russia) Rostov	6	1	2	3	6	12	−6	5	Transfer to Europa League	0–1	3–2	—	2–2
4	(Netherlands) PSV Eindhoven	6	0	2	4	4	11	−7	2		0–1	1–2	0–0	—

Source: UEFA

===== Group F =====
Pos	Team	Pld	W	D	L	GF	GA	GD	Pts	Qualification	DOR	RMA	LEG	SPO
1	(Germany) Borussia Dortmund	6	4	2	0	21	9	+12	14	Advance to knockout phase	—	2–2	8–4	1–0
2	(Spain) Real Madrid	6	3	3	0	16	10	+6	12	Advance to knockout phase	2–2	—	5–1	2–1
3	(Poland) Legia Warsaw	6	1	1	4	9	24	−15	4	Transfer to Europa League	0–6	3–3	—	1–0
4	(Portugal) Sporting CP	6	1	0	5	5	8	−3	3		1–2	1–2	2–0	—

Source: UEFA

===== Group H =====
Pos	Team	Pld	W	D	L	GF	GA	GD	Pts	Qualification	JUV	SEV	LYO	DZG
1	(Italy) Juventus	6	4	2	0	11	2	+9	14	Advance to knockout phase	—	0–0	1–1	2–0
2	(Spain) Sevilla	6	3	2	1	7	3	+4	11	Advance to knockout phase	1–3	—	1–0	4–0
3	(France) Lyon	6	2	2	2	5	3	+2	8	Transfer to Europa League	0–1	0–0	—	3–0
4	(Croatia) Dinamo Zagreb	6	0	0	6	0	15	−15	0		0–4	0–1	0–1	—

Source: UEFA

==== Knockout phase ====
===== Round of 16 =====
Team 1	Agg.	Team 2	1st leg	2nd leg
Real Madrid (Spain)	6–2	(Italy) Napoli	3–1	3–1
Bayer Leverkusen (Germany)	2–4	(Spain) Atlético Madrid	2–4	0–0
Paris Saint-Germain (France)	5–6	(Spain) Barcelona	4–0	1–6
Sevilla (Spain)	2–3	(England) Leicester City	2–1	0–2

===== Quarter-finals =====
Team 1	Agg.	Team 2	1st leg	2nd leg
Atlético Madrid (Spain)	2–1	(England) Leicester City	1–0	1–1
Bayern Munich (Germany)	3–6	(Spain) Real Madrid	1–2	2–4 (a.e.t.)
Juventus (Italy)	3–0	(Spain) Barcelona	3–0	0–0

===== Semi-finals =====
Team 1	Agg.	Team 2	1st leg	2nd leg
Real Madrid (Spain)	4–2	(Spain) Atlético Madrid	3–0	1–2

===== Final =====
The final will be played on 3 June 2017 at Millennium Stadium in Cardiff, Wales. The "home" team (for administrative purposes) was determined by an additional draw held after the semi-final draw.

3 June 2017
19:45 UTC+1

Juventus (Italy)	1–4	(Spain) Real Madrid
Mandžukić 27'	Report	Ronaldo 20', 64'; Casemiro 61'; Asensio 90'

Millennium Stadium, Cardiff
Attendance: 65,842
Referee: Felix Brych (Germany)

=== 2016–17 UEFA Europa League ===
==== Group stage ====
===== Group F =====
Pos	Team	Pld	W	D	L	GF	GA	GD	Pts	Qualification	GNK	ATH	RW	SAS
1	(Belgium) Genk	6	4	0	2	13	9	+4	12	Advance to knockout phase	—	2–0	1–0	3–1
2	(Spain) Athletic Bilbao	6	3	1	2	10	11	−1	10	Advance to knockout phase	5–3	—	1–0	3–2
3	(Austria) Rapid Wien	6	1	3	2	7	8	−1	6		3–2	1–1	—	1–1
4	(Italy) Sassuolo	6	1	2	3	9	11	−2	5		0–2	3–0	2–2	—

Source: UEFA

===== Group G =====
Pos	Team	Pld	W	D	L	GF	GA	GD	Pts	Qualification	AJX	CLT	STL	PAN
1	(Netherlands) Ajax	6	4	2	0	11	6	+5	14	Advance to knockout phase	—	3–2	1–0	2–0
2	(Spain) Celta Vigo	6	2	3	1	10	7	+3	9	Advance to knockout phase	2–2	—	1–1	2–0
3	(Belgium) Standard Liège	6	1	4	1	8	6	+2	7		1–1	1–1	—	2–2
4	(Greece) Panathinaikos	6	0	1	5	3	13	−10	1		1–2	0–2	0–3	—

Source: UEFA

===== Group L =====
Pos	Team	Pld	W	D	L	GF	GA	GD	Pts	Qualification	OSM	VIL	ZUR	STE
1	(Turkey) Osmanlıspor	6	3	1	2	10	7	+3	10	Advance to knockout phase	—	2–2	2–0	2–0
2	(Spain) Villarreal	6	2	3	1	9	8	+1	9	Advance to knockout phase	1–2	—	2–1	2–1
3	(Switzerland) Zürich	6	1	3	2	5	7	−2	6		2–1	1–1	—	0–0
4	(Romania) Steaua București	6	1	3	2	5	7	−2	6		2–1	1–1	1–1	—

Source: UEFA

==== Knockout Phase ====
===== Round of 32 =====
Team 1	Agg.	Team 2	1st leg	2nd leg
Athletic Bilbao (Spain)	3–4	(Cyprus) APOEL	3–2	0–2
Villarreal (Spain)	1–4	(Italy) Roma	0–4	1–0
Celta Vigo (Spain)	2–1	(Ukraine) Shakhtar Donetsk	0–1	2–0 (a.e.t.)

===== Round of 16 =====
Team 1	Agg.	Team 2	1st leg	2nd leg
Celta Vigo (Spain)	4–1	(Russia) Krasnodar	2–1	2–0

===== Quarter-finals =====
Team 1	Agg.	Team 2	1st leg	2nd leg
Celta Vigo (Spain)	4–3	(Belgium) Genk	3–2	1–1

===== Semi-finals =====
Team 1	Agg.	Team 2	1st leg	2nd leg
Celta Vigo (Spain)	1–2	(England) Manchester United	0–1	1–1

=== 2016 UEFA Super Cup ===
9 August 2016
20:45 UTC+2

Real Madrid (Spain)	3–2 (a.e.t.)	(Spain) Sevilla
Asensio 21'; Ramos 90+3'; Carvajal 119'	Report	Vázquez 41'; Konoplyanka 72' (pen.)

Lerkendal Stadion, Trondheim
Attendance: 17,939
Referee: Milorad Mažić (Serbia)

=== 2016–17 UEFA Women's Champions League ===
==== Knockout phase ====
===== Round of 32 =====
Team 1	Agg.	Team 2	1st leg	2nd leg
Athletic Club (Spain)	3–4	(Denmark) Fortuna Hjørring	2–1	1–3 (a.e.t.)
FC Minsk (Belarus)	1–5	(Spain) Barcelona	0–3	1–2

===== Round of 16 =====
Team 1	Agg.	Team 2	1st leg	2nd leg
Barcelona (Spain)	5–0	(Netherlands) Twente	1–0	4–0

===== Quarter-finals =====
Team 1	Agg.	Team 2	1st leg	2nd leg
Rosengård (Sweden)	0–3	(Spain) Barcelona	0–1	0–2

===== Semi-finals =====
Team 1	Agg.	Team 2	1st leg	2nd leg
Barcelona (Spain)	1–5	(France) Paris Saint-Germain	1–3	0–2

== Men's football ==
=== League season ===
==== La Liga ====
Pos	Team	Pld	W	D	L	GF	GA	GD	Pts	Qualification or relegation
1	Real Madrid (C)	38	29	6	3	106	41	+65	93	Qualification for the Champions League group stage
2	Barcelona	38	28	6	4	116	37	+79	90	Qualification for the Champions League group stage
3	Atlético Madrid	38	23	9	6	70	27	+43	78	Qualification for the Champions League group stage
4	Sevilla	38	21	9	8	69	49	+20	72	Qualification for the Champions League play-off round
5	Villarreal	38	19	10	9	56	33	+23	67	Qualification for the Europa League group stage (Note: Since the winners of the 2016–17 Copa del Rey, Barcelona, qualified for European competition based on league position, the spot awarded to the cup winners (Europa League group stage) was passed to the sixth-placed team and the spot awarded to the sixth-placed team (Europa League third qualifying round) was passed to the seventh-placed team.)
6	Real Sociedad	38	19	7	12	59	53	+6	64	Qualification for the Europa League group stage
7	Athletic Bilbao	38	19	6	13	53	43	+10	63	Qualification for the Europa League third qualifying round
8	Espanyol	38	15	11	12	49	50	−1	56	
9	Alavés	38	14	13	11	41	43	−2	55	
10	Eibar	38	15	9	14	56	51	+5	54	
11	Málaga	38	12	10	16	49	55	−6	46 (Note: Málaga ahead of Valencia on head-to-head points: Valencia–Málaga 2–2, Málaga–Valencia 2–0)	
12	Valencia	38	13	7	18	56	65	−9	46	
13	Celta Vigo	38	13	6	19	53	69	−16	45	
14	Las Palmas	38	10	9	19	53	74	−21	39 (Note: Las Palmas ahead of Real Betis on head-to-head goal difference: Las Palmas–Real Betis 4–1, Real Betis–Las Palmas 2–0)	
15	Real Betis	38	10	9	19	41	64	−23	39	
16	Deportivo La Coruña	38	8	12	18	43	61	−18	36	
17	Leganés	38	8	11	19	36	55	−19	35	
18	Sporting Gijón (R)	38	7	10	21	42	72	−30	31	Relegation to Segunda División
19	Osasuna (R)	38	4	10	24	40	94	−54	22	Relegation to Segunda División
20	Granada (R)	38	4	8	26	30	82	−52	20	Relegation to Segunda División

Source: La Liga, Soccerway
Rules for classification: 1) Points; 2) Head-to-head points; 3) Head-to-head goal difference; 4) Goal difference; 5) Goals scored; 6) Fair-play points; 7) Play-off.
(C) Champions; (R) Relegated

==== Segunda División ====
Pos	Team	Pld	W	D	L	GF	GA	GD	Pts	Promotion, qualification or relegation
1	Levante (C, P)	42	25	9	8	57	32	+25	84	Promotion to La Liga
2	Girona (P)	42	20	10	12	65	45	+20	70	Promotion to La Liga
3	Getafe (O, P)	42	18	14	10	55	43	+12	68	Qualification to promotion play-offs
4	Tenerife	42	16	18	8	50	37	+13	66	Qualification to promotion play-offs
5	Cádiz	42	16	16	10	55	40	+15	64	Qualification to promotion play-offs
6	Huesca	42	16	15	11	53	43	+10	63 (Note: Huesca finished ahead of Valladolid on head-to-head points: Valladolid 1–2 Huesca, Huesca 1–0 Valladolid)	Qualification to promotion play-offs
7	Valladolid	42	18	9	15	52	47	+5	63	
8	Oviedo	42	17	10	15	47	47	0	61	
9	Lugo	42	14	13	15	49	52	−3	55 (Note: Lugo and Córdoba finished ahead of Reus on head-to-head points: Lugo 7 pts, Córdoba 7 pts, Reus 3 pts. Lugo finished ahead of Córdoba on head-to-head points: Córdoba 3–3 Lugo, Lugo 1–0 Córdoba)	
10	Córdoba	42	14	13	15	42	52	−10	55	
11	Reus	42	13	16	13	31	29	+2	55	
12	Rayo Vallecano	42	14	11	17	44	44	0	53 (Note: Rayo Vallecano finished ahead of Sevilla Atlético on head-to-head points: Rayo Vallecano 1–1 Sevilla Atlético, Sevilla Atlético 1–2 Rayo Vallecano)	
13	Sevilla Atlético	42	13	14	15	55	56	−1	53	Ineligible for promotion and the Copa del Rey
14	Gimnàstic	42	12	16	14	47	51	−4	52	
15	Almería	42	14	9	19	44	49	−5	51	
16	Zaragoza	42	12	14	16	50	52	−2	50 (Note: Zaragoza and Numancia finished ahead of Alcorcón on head-to-head points: Zaragoza 7 pts, Numancia 7 pts, Alcorcón 2 pts. Zaragoza finished ahead of Numancia on head-to-head goal difference: Numancia 2–1 Zaragoza, Zaragoza 3–0 Numancia)	
17	Numancia	42	11	17	14	40	49	−9	50	
18	Alcorcón	42	13	11	18	32	43	−11	50	
19	UCAM Murcia (R)	42	11	15	16	42	51	−9	48	Relegation to Segunda División B
20	Mallorca (R)	42	9	18	15	42	50	−8	45	Relegation to Segunda División B
21	Elche (R)	42	11	10	21	49	63	−14	43	Relegation to Segunda División B
22	Mirandés (R)	42	9	14	19	40	66	−26	41	Relegation to Segunda División B

Source: La Liga
Rules for classification: 1) points; 2) head-to-head points; 3) head-to-head goal difference; 4) goal difference; 5) number of goals scored
(C) Champions; (O) Play-off winners; (P) Promoted; (R) Relegated

===== Promotion play-offs =====
Semi-finals
Cádiz	1	0	1
Tenerife (b.p.)	0	1	1
Huesca	2	0	2
Getafe	2	3	5

Final
Tenerife	1	1	2
Getafe	0	3	3

==== Segunda División B ====
Group 1
Pos	Team	Pld	Pts
1	Cultural Leonesa (C, O, P)	38	86
2	Racing Santander	38	86
3	Celta Vigo B	38	84
4	Pontevedra	38	60
5	Ponferradina	38	55
6	Valladolid B	38	54
7	Racing Ferrol	38	54
8	Coruxo	38	49
9	Tudelano	38	49
10	Lealtad	38	48
11	Osasuna B	38	47
12	Guijuelo	38	47
13	Izarra	38	46
14	Boiro (R)	38	45
15	Caudal	38	45
16	Burgos (O)	38	45
17	Mutilvera (R)	38	43
18	Palencia (R)	38	38
19	Arandina (R)	38	32
20	Somozas (R)	38	24

Source: BDFutbol.com
(C) Champions;
(O) Play-off winners;
(P) Promoted;
(R) Relegated

Group 2
Pos	Team	Pld	Pts
1	Albacete (O, P)	38	69
2	Toledo	38	65
3	Fuenlabrada	38	63
4	Rayo Majadahonda	38	61
5	Leioa	38	60
6	UD Logroñés	38	56
7	Real Unión	38	56
8	Bilbao Athletic	38	56
9	Arenas	38	55
10	Real Sociedad B	38	52
11	Real Madrid Castilla	38	51
12	Gernika	38	49
13	Barakaldo	38	49
14	Amorebieta	38	48
15	Navalcarnero	38	47
16	San Sebastián de los Reyes (O)	38	47
17	Mensajero (R)	38	46
18	Socuéllamos (R)	38	38
19	Sestao River (R)	38	37
20	Zamudio (R)	38	22

Source: BDFutbol.com
(O) Play-off winners;
(P) Promoted;
(R) Relegated

Group 3
Pos	Team	Pld	Pts
1	Barcelona B (O, P)	38	82
2	Alcoyano	38	67
3	Valencia Mestalla	38	65
4	Atlético Baleares	38	61
5	Badalona	38	60
6	Villarreal B	38	60
7	Hércules	38	57
8	Lleida Esportiu	38	56
9	Cornellà	38	52
10	Gavà (R)	38	50
11	Atlético Saguntino	38	49
12	Ebro	38	49
13	Mallorca B (R)	38	48
14	Llagostera	38	47
15	Sabadell	38	46
16	Atlético Levante (R)	38	42
17	L'Hospitalet (R)	38	38
18	Espanyol B (R)	38	36
19	Prat (R)	38	35
20	Eldense (R)	38	15

Source: BDFutbol.com
(O) Play-off winners;
(P) Promoted;
(R) Relegated

Group 4
Pos	Team	Pld	Pts
1	Lorca FC (O, P)	38	73
2	Murcia	38	67
3	Villanovense	38	66
4	Cartagena	38	65
5	Mérida	38	64
6	Melilla	38	60
7	Marbella	38	58
8	Granada B	38	53
9	Linense	38	52
10	Jumilla	38	48
11	Córdoba B	38	48
12	Recreativo	38	47
13	Extremadura	38	46
14	El Ejido	38	46
15	San Fernando	38	46
16	Linares (R)	38	45
17	Atlético Sanluqueño (R)	38	39
18	Atlético Mancha Real (R)	38	38
19	Jaén (R)	38	37
20	La Roda (R)	38	28

Source: BDFutbol.com
(O) Play-off winners;
(P) Promoted;
(R) Relegated

===== Group champions' play-offs =====
Semifinals
Albacete	1	0	1
Lorca FC (a)	1	0	1
Barcelona B	0	1	1
Cultural Leonesa	2	2	4

Finals
Lorca FC	1	1	2
Cultural Leonesa	1	3	4

Promoted to Segunda División
Albacete (One year later)	Barcelona B (2 years later)	Cultural Leonesa (42 years later)	Lorca FC (First time ever)

=== Cup competitions ===
==== Copa del Rey ====
===== Final =====
27 May 2017
21:30 CEST

Barcelona	3–1	Alavés
Messi 30'; Neymar 45'; Alcácer 45+3'	Report	Hernandez 33'

Vicente Calderón, Madrid
Attendance: 45,000
Referee: Carlos Clos Gómez

==== Supercopa de España ====
14 August 2016
22:00

Sevilla	0–2	Barcelona
	Report	L. Suárez 54'; Munir 81'

Ramón Sánchez Pizjuán, Seville
Attendance: 36,311
Referee: Jesús Gil Manzano

17 August 2016
23:00

Barcelona	3–0	Sevilla
Turan 10', 46'; Messi 55'	Report

Camp Nou, Barcelona
Attendance: 71,803
Referee: Alejandro José Hernández Hernández

==== Copa Federación de España ====
===== Final =====
30 March 2017
19:15

Fuenlabrada	0–0	Atlético Saguntino
	Report

Fernando Torres, Fuenlabrada
Attendance: 2,250
Referee: Patiño Álvarez

6 April 2017
19:15

Atlético Saguntino	3–0	Fuenlabrada
Óscar López 18'; Gámez 38'; Néstor 90+3'	Report

Morvedre, Sagunto
Attendance: 2,100
Referee: García Gallegos

== Women's football ==
=== League season ===
==== Primera División ====
Pos	Team	Pld	W	D	L	GF	GA	GD	Pts	Qualification or relegation
1	Atlético de Madrid (C)	30	24	6	0	91	17	+74	78	Qualification for the UEFA Champions League and Copa de la Reina
2	Barcelona	30	24	3	3	98	13	+85	75	Qualification for the UEFA Champions League and Copa de la Reina
3	Valencia	30	20	8	2	69	11	+58	68	Qualification for the Copa de la Reina
4	Levante	30	18	3	9	53	49	+4	57	Qualification for the Copa de la Reina
5	Athletic Club	30	16	5	9	64	44	+20	53	Qualification for the Copa de la Reina
6	Granadilla	30	13	7	10	53	41	+12	46	Qualification for the Copa de la Reina
7	Rayo Vallecano	30	14	1	15	49	53	−4	43	Qualification for the Copa de la Reina
8	Real Sociedad	30	12	6	12	44	34	+10	42	Qualification for the Copa de la Reina
9	Santa Teresa	30	10	6	14	28	46	−18	36	
10	Sporting de Huelva	30	9	8	13	47	56	−9	35	
11	Betis	30	10	4	16	36	51	−15	34	
12	Zaragoza CFF	30	8	8	14	31	65	−34	32	
13	Espanyol	30	5	8	17	30	60	−30	23	
14	Fundación Albacete	30	5	5	20	37	76	−39	20	
15	Oiartzun (R)	30	4	6	20	23	74	−51	18	Relegation to the Segunda División
16	Tacuense (R)	30	3	6	21	22	85	−63	15	Relegation to the Segunda División

Source: Futbolme
Rules for classification: 1) points; 2) head-to-head points; 3) goal difference; 4) number of goals scored
(C) Champions; (R) Relegated

==== Segunda División ====
===== Group of four teams for promotion =====
Semi-finals
Sevilla	4	3	7
San Ignacio	1	3	4
Oviedo Moderno	1	0	1
Femarguín	1	5	6

Final
Sevilla (a)	2	2	4
Femarguín	1	3	4

===== Group of three teams for promotion =====
Pos	Team	Pld	W	D	L	GF	GA	GD	Pts	Promotion	MAD	SPA	SEA
1	Madrid CFF (P)	4	3	1	0	11	4	+7	10	Promotion to Primera División	—	4–0	2–1
2	Sporting Plaza de Argel	4	1	1	2	5	13	−8	4		2–2	—	3–1
3	Seagull	4	1	0	3	9	8	+1	3		1–3	6–0	—

Rules for classification: 1) points; 2) goal difference; 3) number of goals scored.
(P) Promoted

=== Cup competitions ===
==== Copa de la Reina ====
18 June 2017
11:30

Barcelona	4–1	Atlético de Madrid
Hermoso 41', 49'; Putellas 70'; Bonmatí 83'		Bermúdez 58'

La Ciudad del Fútbol, Las Rozas
Referee: (Extremadura) Francisco José Hernández Maeso
