= 2016–17 in Italian football =

Football in Italy
- Season: 2016–17

Men's football
- Serie A: Juventus
- Serie B: SPAL
- Coppa Italia: Juventus
- Supercoppa Italiana: Milan

The 2016–17 season is the 115th season of competitive football in Italy.

== Promotions and relegations (pre-season) ==
Teams promoted to Serie A

- Crotone
- Cagliari
- Pescara

Teams relegated from Serie A

- Carpi
- Frosinone
- Hellas Verona

Teams promoted to Serie B

- Cittadella
- SPAL
- Benevento
- Pisa

Teams relegated from Serie B

- Como
- Livorno
- Modena
- Virtus Lanciano

== National teams ==
=== Italy national football team ===
==== UEFA Euro 2016 ====
===== Group stage =====
Pos	Team	Pld	W	D	L	GF	GA	GD	Pts	Qualification
1	Italy	3	2	0	1	3	1	+2	6 (Note: Head-to-head result: Belgium 0–2 Italy.)	Advance to knockout stage
2	Belgium	3	2	0	1	4	2	+2	6	Advance to knockout stage
3	Republic of Ireland	3	1	1	1	2	4	−2	4	Advance to knockout stage
4	Sweden	3	0	1	2	1	3	−2	1	

Source: UEFA
Rules for classification: Group stage tiebreakers
Notes:

13 June 2016 UEFA Euro 2016	Belgium	0–2	Italy	Lyon, France
21:00 CEST (UTC+02:00)		Report	Giaccherini 32'; Pellè 90+3'	Stadium: Parc Olympique Lyonnais; Attendance: 55,408; Referee: Mark Clattenburg (England)

17 June 2016 UEFA Euro 2016	Italy	1–0	Sweden	Toulouse, France
15:00 CEST (UTC+02:00)	Éder 88'	Report		Stadium: Stadium Municipal; Attendance: 29,600; Referee: Viktor Kassai (Hungary)

22 June 2016 UEFA Euro 2016	Italy	0–1	Republic of Ireland	Lille, France
21:00 CEST (UTC+02:00)		Report	Brady 85'	Stadium: Stade Pierre-Mauroy; Attendance: 44,268; Referee: Ovidiu Hațegan (Romania)

===== Round of 16 =====
27 June 2016 UEFA Euro 2016	Italy	2–0	Spain	Saint-Denis, France
18:00 CEST (UTC+02:00)	Chiellini 33'; Pellè 90+1'	Report		Stadium: Stade de France; Attendance: 76,165; Referee: Cüneyt Çakır (Turkey)

===== Quarter-final =====
2 July 2016 UEFA Euro 2016	Germany	1–1 (a.e.t.) (6–5 p)	Italy	Bordeaux, France
21:00 CEST (UTC+02:00)	Özil 65'	Report	Bonucci 78' (pen.)	Stadium: Nouveau Stade de Bordeaux; Attendance: 38,764; Referee: Viktor Kassai (Hungary)
	Penalties
	Kroos (penalty scored); Müller (penalty missed); Özil (penalty missed); Draxler (penalty scored); Schweinsteiger (penalty missed); Hummels (penalty scored); Kimmich (penalty scored); Boateng (penalty scored); Hector (penalty scored)		(penalty scored) Insigne; (penalty missed) Zaza; (penalty scored) Barzagli; (penalty missed) Pellè; (penalty missed) Bonucci; (penalty scored) Giaccherini; (penalty scored) Parolo; (penalty scored) De Sciglio; (penalty missed) Darmian

==== Friendlies ====
29 May 2016 Friendly	Italy	1–0	Scotland	Ta' Qali, Malta
20:45 CEST (UTC+02:00)	Pellè 57'	Report		Stadium: Ta' Qali National Stadium; Attendance: 17,000; Referee: Alan Mario Sant (Malta)

6 June 2016 Friendly	Italy	2–0	Finland	Verona, Italy
20:45 CEST (UTC+02:00)	Candreva 27' (pen.); De Rossi 71'	Report		Stadium: Stadio Marc'Antonio Bentegodi; Attendance: 27,702; Referee: Bas Nijhuis (Netherlands)

1 September 2016 Friendly	Italy	1–3	France	Bari, Italy
21:00 CEST (UTC+02:00)	Pellè 21'	Report	Martial 17'; Giroud 28'; Kurzawa 81'	Stadium: Stadio San Nicola; Attendance: 39,000; Referee: Björn Kuipers (Netherlands)

15 November 2016 Friendly	Italy	0–0	Germany	Milan, Italy
20:45 CET (UTC+01:00)		Report		Stadium: San Siro; Attendance: 48,600; Referee: Artur Soares Dias (Portugal)

28 March 2017 Friendly	Netherlands	1–2	Italy	Amsterdam, Netherlands
20:45 CEST (UTC+02:00)	Romagnoli 10' (o.g.)	Report	Éder 11'; Bonucci 32'	Stadium: Amsterdam Arena; Attendance: 42,000; Referee: Jonas Eriksson (Sweden)

==== 2018 FIFA World Cup qualification ====
Pos	Team	Pld	W	D	L	GF	GA	GD	Pts	Qualification
1	Spain	10	9	1	0	36	3	+33	28	Qualification to 2018 FIFA World Cup
2	Italy	10	7	2	1	21	8	+13	23	Advance to second round
3	Albania	10	4	1	5	10	13	−3	13	
4	Israel	10	4	0	6	10	15	−5	12	
5	Macedonia	10	3	2	5	15	15	0	11	
6	Liechtenstein	10	0	0	10	1	39	−38	0	

Source: FIFA
Rules for classification: Qualification tiebreakers

5 September 2016 2018 FIFA World Cup qualification	Israel	1–3	Italy	Haifa, Israel
20:45 CEST (UTC+02:00)	Ben Haim II 35'	Report	Pellè 14'; Candreva 31' (pen.); Immobile 83'	Stadium: Sammy Ofer Stadium; Attendance: 30,000; Referee: Sergei Karasev (Russia)

6 October 2016 2018 FIFA World Cup qualification	Italy	1–1	Spain	Turin, Italy
20:45 CEST (UTC+02:00)	De Rossi 82' (pen.)	Report	Vitolo 55'	Stadium: Juventus Stadium; Attendance: 38,470; Referee: Felix Brych (Germany)

9 October 2016 2018 FIFA World Cup qualification	Macedonia	2–3	Italy	Skopje, Macedonia
20:45 CEST (UTC+02:00)	Nestorovski 57'; Hasani 59'	Report	Belotti 24'; Immobile 75', 90+2'	Stadium: Philip II Arena; Attendance: 19,195; Referee: Danny Makkelie (Netherlands)

12 November 2016 2018 FIFA World Cup qualification	Liechtenstein	0–4	Italy	Vaduz, Liechtenstein
20:45 CET (UTC+01:00)		Report	Belotti 11', 44'; Immobile 12'; Candreva 32'	Stadium: Rheinpark Stadion; Attendance: 5,864; Referee: Ivan Bebek (Croatia)

24 March 2017 2018 FIFA World Cup qualification	Italy	2–0	Albania	Palermo, Italy
20:45 CET (UTC+01:00)	De Rossi 12' (pen.); Immobile 71'	Report		Stadium: Stadio Renzo Barbera; Attendance: 33,136; Referee: Slavko Vinčić (Slovenia)

== League season ==
=== Serie A ===
Pos	Team	Pld	W	D	L	GF	GA	GD	Pts	Qualification or relegation
1	Juventus (C)	38	29	4	5	77	27	+50	91	Qualification for the Champions League group stage
2	Roma	38	28	3	7	90	38	+52	87	Qualification for the Champions League group stage
3	Napoli	38	26	8	4	94	39	+55	86	Qualification for the Champions League play-off round
4	Atalanta	38	21	9	8	62	41	+21	72	Qualification for the Europa League group stage (Note: Since the winners of the 2016–17 Coppa Italia, Juventus, qualified for European competition based on league position, the spot awarded to the cup winners (Europa League group stage) was passed to the fifth-placed team and the spot awarded to the fifth-placed team (Europa League third qualifying round) was passed to the sixth-placed team.)
5	Lazio	38	21	7	10	74	51	+23	70	Qualification for the Europa League group stage
6	Milan	38	18	9	11	57	45	+12	63	Qualification for the Europa League third qualifying round
7	Internazionale	38	19	5	14	72	49	+23	62	
8	Fiorentina	38	16	12	10	63	57	+6	60	
9	Torino	38	13	14	11	71	66	+5	53	
10	Sampdoria	38	12	12	14	49	55	−6	48	
11	Cagliari	38	14	5	19	55	76	−21	47	
12	Sassuolo	38	13	7	18	58	63	−5	46	
13	Udinese	38	12	9	17	47	56	−9	45	
14	Chievo	38	12	7	19	43	61	−18	43	
15	Bologna	38	11	8	19	40	58	−18	41	
16	Genoa	38	9	9	20	38	64	−26	36	
17	Crotone	38	9	7	22	34	58	−24	34	
18	Empoli (R)	38	8	8	22	29	61	−32	32	Relegation to Serie B
19	Palermo (R)	38	6	8	24	33	77	−44	26	Relegation to Serie B
20	Pescara (R)	38	3	9	26	37	81	−44	18	Relegation to Serie B

Source: Serie A, Soccerway
Rules for classification: 1) Points; 2) Head-to-head points; 3) Head-to-head goal difference; 4) Goal difference; 5) Goals scored; 6) Draw.
(C) Champions; (R) Relegated

=== Serie B ===
Pos	Team	Pld	W	D	L	GF	GA	GD	Pts	Promotion, qualification or relegation
1	SPAL (C, P)	42	22	12	8	66	39	+27	78	Promotion to Serie A
2	Hellas Verona (P)	42	20	14	8	64	40	+24	74 (Note: Hellas Verona is ahead of Frosinone on head-to-head goal difference: Hellas Verona 2–0 Frosinone, Frosinone 1–0 Hellas Verona.)	Promotion to Serie A
3	Frosinone	42	21	11	10	57	42	+15	74	Qualification to promotion play-offs semi-finals
4	Perugia	42	15	20	7	54	40	+14	65 (Note: Perugia is ahead of Benevento on head-to-head points: Perugia 3–1 Benevento, Benevento 0–0 Perugia.)	Qualification to promotion play-offs semi-finals
5	Benevento (Note: Benevento was deducted one point.) (O, P)	42	18	12	12	56	42	+14	65	Qualification to promotion play-offs preliminary round
6	Cittadella	42	19	6	17	60	54	+6	63	Qualification to promotion play-offs preliminary round
7	Carpi	42	16	14	12	41	40	+1	62	Qualification to promotion play-offs preliminary round
8	Spezia	42	15	15	12	38	34	+4	60	Qualification to promotion play-offs preliminary round
9	Novara	42	15	11	16	48	50	−2	56	
10	Salernitana	42	13	15	14	44	44	0	54 (Note: Salernitana is ahead of Virtus Entella on head-to-head points: Salernitana 1–1 Virtus Entella, Virtus Entella 0–1 Salernitana.)	
11	Virtus Entella	42	13	15	14	54	51	+3	54	
12	Bari	42	13	14	15	39	44	−5	53 (Note: Bari is ahead of Cesena on head-to-head points: Bari 2–1 Cesena, Cesena 1–1 Bari.)	
13	Cesena	42	12	17	13	51	48	+3	53	
14	Avellino (Note: Avellino was initially deducted three points due to match fixing. The deduction was later changed to two points.)	42	13	13	16	40	55	−15	50 (Note: Avellino is ahead of Brescia on head-to-head points: Avellino 1–1 Brescia, Brescia 0–2 Avellino.)	
15	Brescia	42	11	17	14	49	58	−9	50	
16	Ascoli	42	10	19	13	44	49	−5	49 (Note: Head-to-head points: Ascoli 7 pts, Pro Vercelli 7 pts, Ternana 3 pts. Ascoli is ahead of Pro Vercelli on head-to-head record: Ascoli 3–1 Pro Vercelli, Pro Vercelli 1–1 Ascoli.)	
17	Pro Vercelli	42	10	19	13	35	45	−10	49	
18	Ternana (Note: Since the difference between the 18th-placed team and the 19th-placed team was five points, there was no play-out and the 19th-placed team was relegated directly.)	42	13	10	19	42	53	−11	49	
19	Trapani (R)	42	10	14	18	45	55	−10	44	Relegation to Serie C
20	Vicenza (R)	42	9	14	19	33	52	−19	41	Relegation to Serie C
21	Latina (Note: Latina was initially deducted seven points. The deduction was later changed to four points.) (R, E, R)	42	6	21	15	38	50	−12	35 (Note: Latina is ahead of Pisa on overall goal difference.)	Relegation to Serie D (Note: Latina was declared insolvent and excluded from the Italian football league system. The team was later refound in Serie D.)
22	Pisa (Note: Pisa was deducted four points.) (R)	42	6	21	15	23	36	−13	35	Relegation to Serie C

Source: Lega Serie B
Rules for classification: 1) Points; 2) Head-to-head points; 3) Head-to-head goal difference; 4) Goal difference; 5) Goals scored; 6) Draw.
(C) Champions; (E) Eliminated; (O) Play-off winners; (P) Promoted; (R) Relegated

=== Lega Pro ===
Group A

Pos	Team	Pld	Pts
1	Cremonese (P)	38	78
2	Alessandria	38	78
3	Livorno	38	69
4	Arezzo	38	65
5	Giana Erminio	38	63
6	Piacenza	38	61
7	Como (E, R)	38	59
8	Viterbese	38	54
9	Lucchese	38	51
10	Renate	38	51
11	Pro Piacenza	38	51
12	Siena	38	45
13	Pistoiese	38	43
14	Pontedera	38	43
15	Olbia	38	42
16	Carrarese	38	39
17	Prato	38	39
18	Tuttocuoio (R)	38	38
19	Lupa Roma (R)	38	33
20	Racing Roma (R)	38	30

Updated to match(es) played on 12 May 2017.
Source: Soccerway
(E) Eliminated;
(P) Promoted;
(R) Relegated
Group B

Pos	Team	Pld	Pts
1	Venezia (P)	38	80
2	Parma (O, P)	38	70
3	Pordenone	38	66
4	Padova	38	66
5	Reggiana	38	59
6	Gubbio	38	58
7	Sambenedettese	38	56
8	FeralpiSalò	38	53
9	Albinoleffe	38	52
10	Bassano Virtus	38	51
11	Santarcangelo	38	50
12	Südtirol	38	47
13	Maceratese (E, R, R, R)	38	45
14	Modena	38	44
15	Mantova (E, R)	38	41
16	Teramo	38	40
17	Fano	38	39
18	Forlì (R)	38	37
19	Lumezzane (R)	38	34
20	Ancona (R)	38	31

Updated to match(es) played on 12 May 2017.
Source: Lega Pro
(E) Eliminated;
(O) Play-off winners;
(P) Promoted;
(R) Relegated
Group C

Pos	Team	Pld	Pts
1	Foggia (C, P)	38	85
2	Lecce	38	74
3	Matera	38	65
4	Juve Stabia	38	64
5	Virtus Francavilla	38	57
6	Siracusa	38	57
7	Cosenza	38	55
8	Paganese	38	50
9	Casertana	38	49
10	Fondi	38	49
11	Catania	38	47
12	Fidelis Andria	38	47
13	Reggina	38	45
14	Messina (E, R)	38	44
15	Monopoli	38	42
16	Akragas	38	39
17	Vibonese (R)	38	39
18	Catanzaro	38	38
19	Melfi (R)	38	34
20	Taranto (R)	38	30

Updated to match(es) played on 12 May 2017.
Source: Lega Pro
(C) Champions;
(E) Eliminated;
(P) Promoted;
(R) Relegated

== Cup competitions ==
=== Supercoppa Italiana ===
23 December 2016
19:30 AST

Juventus	1–1 (a.e.t.)	Milan
Chiellini 18'	Report	Bonaventura 38'
Penalties
Marchisio (penalty scored); Mandžukić (penalty missed); Higuaín (penalty scored); Khedira (penalty scored); Dybala (penalty missed)	3–4	(penalty missed) Lapadula; (penalty scored) Bonaventura; (penalty scored) Kucka; (penalty scored) Suso; (penalty scored) Pašalić

Jassim Bin Hamad Stadium, Doha
Attendance: 11,356
Referee: Antonio Damato

Juventus	Milan

GK	1	(Italy) Gianluigi Buffon (c)
RB	26	(Switzerland) Stephan Lichtsteiner	(yellow card) 35'
CB	24	(Italy) Daniele Rugani
CB	3	(Italy) Giorgio Chiellini
LB	12	(Brazil) Alex Sandro		(substituted off) 32'
CM	6	(Germany) Sami Khedira
CM	8	(Italy) Claudio Marchisio
CM	27	(Italy) Stefano Sturaro		(substituted off) 79'
AM	5	(Bosnia and Herzegovina) Miralem Pjanić		(substituted off) 67'
CF	9	(Argentina) Gonzalo Higuaín	(yellow card) 120+1'
CF	17	(Croatia) Mario Mandžukić
Substitutes:
GK	25	(Brazil) Neto
GK	32	(Italy) Emil Audero
DF	4	(Morocco) Medhi Benatia
DF	15	(Italy) Andrea Barzagli
DF	33	(France) Patrice Evra		(substituted on) 32'
DF	40	(Italy) Luca Coccolo
MF	7	(Colombia) Juan Cuadrado
MF	11	(Brazil) Hernanes
MF	18	(Gabon) Mario Lemina		(substituted on) 79'
MF	20	(Croatia) Marko Pjaca
MF	22	(Ghana) Kwadwo Asamoah
FW	21	(Argentina) Paulo Dybala		(substituted on) 67'
Manager:
(Italy) Massimiliano Allegri

GK	99	(Italy) Gianluigi Donnarumma
RB	20	(Italy) Ignazio Abate (c)		(substituted off) 102'
CB	29	(Italy) Gabriel Paletta
CB	13	(Italy) Alessio Romagnoli	(yellow card) 43'
LB	2	(Italy) Mattia De Sciglio	(yellow card) 70'
CM	33	(Slovakia) Juraj Kucka	(yellow card) 59'
CM	73	(Italy) Manuel Locatelli		(substituted off) 73'
CM	91	(Italy) Andrea Bertolacci
RW	8	(Spain) Suso
CF	70	(Colombia) Carlos Bacca		(substituted off) 102'
LW	5	(Italy) Giacomo Bonaventura
Substitutes:
GK	1	(Brazil) Gabriel
DF	15	(Paraguay) Gustavo Gómez
DF	17	(Colombia) Cristián Zapata
DF	31	(Italy) Luca Antonelli		(substituted on) 102'
MF	10	(Japan) Keisuke Honda
MF	14	(Chile) Matías Fernández
MF	16	(Italy) Andrea Poli
MF	23	(Argentina) José Sosa
MF	80	(Croatia) Mario Pašalić		(substituted on) 73'
FW	7	(Brazil) Luiz Adriano
FW	9	(Italy) Gianluca Lapadula		(substituted on) 102'
FW	11	(France) M'Baye Niang
Manager:
(Italy) Vincenzo Montella

Assistant referees:
Riccardo Di Fiore
Alessandro Giallatini
Fourth official:
Marco Barbirati
Additional assistant referees:
Paolo Valeri
Carmine Russo

Match rules

- 90 minutes.
- 30 minutes of extra time if necessary.
- Penalty shoot-out if scores still level.
- Twelve named substitutes, of which up to three may be used.

=== Coppa Italia ===
17 May 2017
21:00 CEST (UTC+2)

Juventus	2–0	Lazio
Dani Alves 12'; Bonucci 24'	Report

Stadio Olimpico, Rome
Attendance: 66,341
Referee: Paolo Tagliavento

Juventus	Lazio

GK	25	(Brazil) Neto
CB	15	(Italy) Andrea Barzagli
CB	19	(Italy) Leonardo Bonucci
CB	3	(Italy) Giorgio Chiellini (c)
RM	23	(Brazil) Dani Alves	(yellow card) 86'
CM	8	(Italy) Claudio Marchisio
CM	28	(Venezuela) Tomás Rincón
LM	12	(Brazil) Alex Sandro
AM	21	(Argentina) Paulo Dybala		(substituted off) 78'
AM	17	(Croatia) Mario Mandžukić
CF	9	(Argentina) Gonzalo Higuaín
Substitutes:
GK	1	(Italy) Gianluigi Buffon
GK	32	(Italy) Emil Audero
DF	4	(Morocco) Medhi Benatia
FW	7	(Colombia) Juan Cuadrado
MF	14	(Italy) Federico Mattiello
MF	18	(Gabon) Mario Lemina		(substituted on) 78'
MF	22	(Ghana) Kwadwo Asamoah
DF	26	(Switzerland) Stephan Lichtsteiner
MF	27	(Italy) Stefano Sturaro
FW	34	(Italy) Moise Kean
FW	46	(France) Mehdi Léris
Manager:
(Italy) Massimiliano Allegri

GK	1	(Albania) Thomas Strakosha
CB	13	(Brazil) Wallace
CB	3	(Netherlands) Stefan de Vrij	(substituted off) 69'
CB	15	(Angola) Bastos	(substituted off) 53'
RM	8	(Serbia) Dušan Basta
CM	16	(Italy) Marco Parolo	(substituted off) 21'
CM	20	(Argentina) Lucas Biglia (c)
CM	21	(Serbia) Sergej Milinković-Savić
LM	19	(Bosnia and Herzegovina) Senad Lulić
CF	17	(Italy) Ciro Immobile
CF	14	(Senegal) Keita Baldé
Substitutes:
GK	31	(Lithuania) Marius Adamonis
GK	55	(Croatia) Ivan Vargić
DF	2	(Netherlands) Wesley Hoedt
DF	4	(Spain) Patric
FW	9	(Serbia) Filip Đorđević
MF	10	(Brazil) Felipe Anderson	(substituted on) 53'
FW	11	(Italy) Luca Crecco
MF	18	(Spain) Luis Alberto	(substituted on) 69'
FW	25	(Italy) Cristiano Lombardi
DF	26	(Romania) Ștefan Radu	(substituted on) 21'
FW	71	(Spain) Mamadou Tounkara
MF	96	(Italy) Alessandro Murgia
Manager:
(Italy) Simone Inzaghi

Match rules

- 90 minutes.
- 30 minutes of extra time if necessary.
- Penalty shoot-out if scores still level.

== Juventus ==
=== UEFA Champions League ===
==== Group stage ====
Pos	Team	Pld	W	D	L	GF	GA	GD	Pts	Qualification	JUV	SEV	LYO	DZG
1	(Italy) Juventus	6	4	2	0	11	2	+9	14	Advance to knockout phase	—	0–0	1–1	2–0
2	(Spain) Sevilla	6	3	2	1	7	3	+4	11	Advance to knockout phase	1–3	—	1–0	4–0
3	(France) Lyon	6	2	2	2	5	3	+2	8	Transfer to Europa League	0–1	0–0	—	3–0
4	(Croatia) Dinamo Zagreb	6	0	0	6	0	15	−15	0		0–4	0–1	0–1	—

Source: UEFA
Rules for classification: Group stage tiebreakers

14 September 2016 1	Juventus (Italy)	0–0	(Spain) Sevilla	Turin, Italy
20:45 CEST (UTC+02:00)		Report	Nzonzi (yellow card) 36'; Iborra (yellow card) 40'; Rami (yellow card) 45+2'	Stadium: Juventus Stadium; Attendance: 33,261; Referee: Deniz Aytekin (Germany)

27 September 2016 2	Dinamo Zagreb (Croatia)	0–4	(Italy) Juventus	Zagreb, Croatia
20:45 CEST (UTC+02:00)		Report	Pjanić 24'; Higuaín 31'; Dybala 57'; Dani Alves 85'	Stadium: Stadion Maksimir; Attendance: 23,875; Referee: Jorge Sousa (Portugal)

18 October 2016 3	Lyon (France)	0–1	(Italy) Juventus	Décines-Charpieu, France
20:45 CEST (UTC+02:00)	Rafael (yellow card) 29'; Darder (yellow card) 52'; Lacazette (yellow card) 60'; Diakhaby (yellow card) 73'; Ferri (yellow card) 83'	Report	Bonucci (yellow card) 34'; Lemina (yellow card) 41' (yellow-red card) 54'; Cuadrado 76'	Stadium: Parc Olympique Lyonnais; Attendance: 53,907; Referee: Szymon Marciniak (Poland)

2 November 2016 4	Juventus (Italy)	1–1	(France) Lyon	Turin, Italy
20:45 CET (UTC+01:00)	Higuaín 13' (pen.); Pjanić (yellow card) 38'; Barzagli (yellow card) 58'; Marchisio (yellow card) 84'; Sturaro (yellow card) 89'	Report	Tolisso 85'; Darder (yellow card) 90+1'; Ghezzal (yellow card) 90+4'	Stadium: Juventus Stadium; Attendance: 40,356; Referee: Björn Kuipers (Netherlands)

22 November 2016 5	Sevilla (Spain)	1–3	(Italy) Juventus	Seville, Spain
20:45 CET (UTC+01:00)	Pareja 9'; Vázquez (yellow card) 31' (yellow-red card) 36'; Mercado (yellow card) 37'; Iborra (yellow card) 90+4'	Report	Mandžukić (yellow card) 25', (goal) 90+4'; Khedira (yellow card) 42'; Marchisio 45+2' (pen.); Evra (yellow card) 65'; Cuadrado (yellow card) 72'; Bonucci 84'	Stadium: Ramón Sánchez Pizjuán; Attendance: 38,942; Referee: Mark Clattenburg (England)

7 December 2016 6	Juventus (Italy)	2–0	(Croatia) Dinamo Zagreb	Turin, Italy
20:45 CET (UTC+01:00)	Higuaín (yellow card) 15', (goal) 52'; Evra (yellow card) 54'; Rugani 73'	Report	Ćorić (yellow card) 61'	Stadium: Juventus Stadium; Attendance: 39,380; Referee: Anthony Taylor (England)

==== Knockout phase ====
===== Round of 16 =====
22 February 2017 First leg	Porto (Portugal)	0–2	(Italy) Juventus	Porto, Portugal
20:45 CET (UTC+01:00)	Telles (yellow card) 25' (yellow-red card) 27'; Pereira (yellow card) 45+2'; Herrera (yellow card) 85'; Marcano (yellow card) 89'	Report	Lichtsteiner (yellow card) 50'; Pjaca 72'; Dani Alves 74'	Stadium: Estádio do Dragão; Attendance: 49,229; Referee: Felix Brych (Germany)

14 March 2017 Second leg	Juventus (Italy)	1–0 (3–0 agg.)	(Portugal) Porto	Turin, Italy
20:45 CET (UTC+01:00)	Cuadrado (yellow card) 12'; Dybala 42' (pen.)	Report	Layún (yellow card) 30'; André André (yellow card) 36'; Pereira (red card) 40'	Stadium: Juventus Stadium; Attendance: 41,161; Referee: Ovidiu Hațegan (Romania)

===== Quarter-finals =====
11 April 2017 First leg	Juventus (Italy)	3–0	(Spain) Barcelona	Turin, Italy
20:45 CEST (UTC+02:00)	Dybala 7', 22'; Dani Alves (yellow card) 28'; Chiellini 55'; Mandžukić (yellow card) 63'; Khedira (yellow card) 74'; Lemina (yellow card) 90+1'	Report	Suárez (yellow card) 53'; Iniesta (yellow card) 57'; Umtiti (yellow card) 90+1'	Stadium: Juventus Stadium; Attendance: 41,092; Referee: Szymon Marciniak (Poland)

19 April 2017 Second leg	Barcelona (Spain)	0–0 (0–3 agg.)	(Italy) Juventus	Barcelona, Spain
20:45 CEST (UTC+02:00)	Iniesta (yellow card) 41'; Neymar (yellow card) 44'	Report	Chiellini (yellow card) 57'; Khedira (yellow card) 64'	Stadium: Camp Nou; Attendance: 96,290; Referee: Björn Kuipers (Netherlands)

===== Semi-finals =====
3 May 2017 First leg	Monaco (France)	0–2	(Italy) Juventus	Monaco
20:45 CEST (UTC+02:00)	Fabinho (yellow card) 37'	Report	Bonucci (yellow card) 21'; Higuaín 29', 59'; Marchisio (yellow card) 58'; Chiellini (yellow card) 69'	Stadium: Stade Louis II; Attendance: 16,762; Referee: Antonio Mateu Lahoz (Spain)

9 May 2017 Second leg	Juventus (Italy)	2–1 (4–1 agg.)	(France) Monaco	Turin, Italy
20:45 CEST (UTC+02:00)	Mandžukić 33', (yellow card) 90+1'; Dani Alves 44'; Bonucci (yellow card) 74'	Report	Falcao (yellow card) 40'; Mendy (yellow card) 51'; Mbappé 69'	Stadium: Juventus Stadium; Attendance: 40,244; Referee: Björn Kuipers (Netherlands)

===== Final =====
3 June 2017 Final	Juventus (Italy)	1–4	(Spain) Real Madrid	Cardiff, Wales
20:45 CEST (UTC+02:00)	Dybala (yellow card) 12'; Mandžukić 27'; Pjanić (yellow card) 66'; Alex Sandro (yellow card) 70'; Cuadrado (yellow card) 72' (yellow-red card) 84'	Report	Ronaldo 20', 64'; Ramos (yellow card) 31'; Carvajal (yellow card) 42'; Kroos (yellow card) 53'; Casemiro 61'; Asensio 90'	Stadium: Millennium Stadium; Attendance: 65,842; Referee: Felix Brych (Germany)
