= 2016–17 UEFA Champions League knockout phase =

The 2016–17 UEFA Champions League knockout phase began on 14 February and ended on 3 June 2017 with the final at Millennium Stadium in Cardiff, Wales, to decide the champions of the 2016–17 UEFA Champions League. A total of 16 teams competed in the knockout phase.

Times are CET/CEST, (Note: CET (UTC+1) for matches to 15 March 2017, and CEST (UTC+2) for matches from 11 April 2017.) as listed by UEFA (local times, if different, are in parentheses).

== Round and draw dates ==
The schedule of the competition was as follows (all draws were held at the UEFA headquarters in Nyon, Switzerland, unless stated otherwise).

Round	Draw date and time	First leg	Second leg
Round of 16	12 December 2016, 12:00	14–15 & 21–22 February 2017	7–8 & 14–15 March 2017
Quarter-finals	17 March 2017, 12:00	11–12 April 2017	18–19 April 2017
Semi-finals	21 April 2017, 12:00	2–3 May 2017	9–10 May 2017
Final	21 April 2017, 12:00	3 June 2017 at Millennium Stadium, Cardiff	

== Format ==
The knockout phase involved the 16 teams which qualified as winners and runners-up of each of the eight groups in the group stage.

Each tie in the knockout phase, apart from the final, was played over two legs, with each team playing one leg at home. The team that scored more goals on aggregate over the two legs advanced to the next round. If the aggregate score was level, the away goals rule was applied, i.e. the team that scored more goals away from home over the two legs advanced. If away goals were also equal, then thirty minutes of extra time was played. The away goals rule was again applied after extra time, i.e. if there were goals scored during extra time and the aggregate score was still level, the visiting team advanced by virtue of more away goals scored. If no goals were scored during extra time, the tie was decided by penalty shoot-out. In the final, which was played as a single match, if scores were level at the end of normal time, extra time was played, followed by a penalty shoot-out if scores remained tied.

The mechanism of the draws for each round was as follows:

- In the draw for the round of 16, the eight group winners were seeded, and the eight group runners-up were unseeded. The seeded teams were drawn against the unseeded teams, with the seeded teams hosting the second leg. Teams from the same group or the same association could not be drawn against each other.
- In the draws for the quarter-finals onwards, there were no seedings, and teams from the same group or the same association could be drawn against each other.

== Qualified teams ==
Group	Winners (Seeded in round of 16 draw)	Runners-up (Unseeded in round of 16 draw)
A	(England) Arsenal	(France) Paris Saint-Germain
B	(Italy) Napoli	(Portugal) Benfica
C	(Spain) Barcelona	(England) Manchester City
D	(Spain) Atlético Madrid	(Germany) Bayern Munich
E	(France) Monaco	(Germany) Bayer Leverkusen
F	(Germany) Borussia Dortmund	(Spain) Real Madrid
G	(England) Leicester City	(Portugal) Porto
H	(Italy) Juventus	(Spain) Sevilla

== Bracket ==
Round of 16
(Portugal) Benfica	1	0	1
(Germany) Borussia Dortmund	0	4	4
(England) Manchester City	5	1	6
(France) Monaco (a)	3	3	6
(Portugal) Porto	0	0	0
(Italy) Juventus	2	1	3
(France) Paris Saint-Germain	4	1	5
(Spain) Barcelona	0	6	6
(Germany) Bayern Munich	5	5	10
(England) Arsenal	1	1	2
(Spain) Real Madrid	3	3	6
(Italy) Napoli	1	1	2
(Germany) Bayer Leverkusen	2	0	2
(Spain) Atlético Madrid	4	0	4
(Spain) Sevilla	2	0	2
(England) Leicester City	1	2	3

Quarter-finals
(Germany) Borussia Dortmund	2	1	3
(France) Monaco	3	3	6
(Italy) Juventus	3	0	3
(Spain) Barcelona	0	0	0
(Germany) Bayern Munich	1	2	3
(Spain) Real Madrid (a.e.t.)	2	4	6
(Spain) Atlético Madrid	1	1	2
(England) Leicester City	0	1	1

Semi-finals
(France) Monaco	0	1	1
(Italy) Juventus	2	2	4
(Spain) Real Madrid	3	1	4
(Spain) Atlético Madrid	0	2	2

Final
3 June – Cardiff
(Italy) Juventus	1
(Spain) Real Madrid	4

== Round of 16 ==
The draw was held on 12 December 2016. The first legs were played on 14, 15, 21 and 22 February, and the second legs were played on 7, 8, 14 and 15 March 2017.

=== Summary ===
Team 1	Agg.	Team 2	1st leg	2nd leg
Manchester City (England)	6–6 (a)	(France) Monaco	5–3	1–3
Real Madrid (Spain)	6–2	(Italy) Napoli	3–1	3–1
Benfica (Portugal)	1–4	(Germany) Borussia Dortmund	1–0	0–4
Bayern Munich (Germany)	10–2	(England) Arsenal	5–1	5–1
Porto (Portugal)	0–3	(Italy) Juventus	0–2	0–1
Bayer Leverkusen (Germany)	2–4	(Spain) Atlético Madrid	2–4	0–0
Paris Saint-Germain (France)	5–6	(Spain) Barcelona	4–0	1–6
Sevilla (Spain)	2–3	(England) Leicester City	2–1	0–2

=== Matches ===
21 February 2017
20:45 (19:45 UTC+0)

Manchester City (England)	5–3	(France) Monaco
Sterling 26'; Agüero 58', 71'; Stones 77'; Sané 82'	Report	Falcao 32', 61'; Mbappé 40'

City of Manchester Stadium, Manchester
Attendance: 53,351
Referee: Antonio Mateu Lahoz (Spain)
15 March 2017
20:45

Monaco (France)	3–1	(England) Manchester City
Mbappé 8'; Fabinho 29'; Bakayoko 77'	Report	Sané 71'

Stade Louis II, Monaco
Attendance: 15,700
Referee: Gianluca Rocchi (Italy)

6–6 on aggregate; Monaco won on away goals.

15 February 2017
20:45

Real Madrid (Spain)	3–1	(Italy) Napoli
Benzema 18'; Kroos 49'; Casemiro 54'	Report	Insigne 8'

Santiago Bernabéu, Madrid
Attendance: 78,000
Referee: Damir Skomina (Slovenia)
7 March 2017
20:45

Napoli (Italy)	1–3	(Spain) Real Madrid
Mertens 24'	Report	Ramos 52'; Mertens 57' (o.g.); Morata 90+1'

Stadio San Paolo, Naples
Attendance: 56,695
Referee: Cüneyt Çakır (Turkey)

Real Madrid won 6–2 on aggregate.

14 February 2017
20:45 (19:45 UTC+0)

Benfica (Portugal)	1–0	(Germany) Borussia Dortmund
Mitroglou 48'	Report

Estádio da Luz, Lisbon
Attendance: 55,124
Referee: Nicola Rizzoli (Italy)
8 March 2017
20:45

Borussia Dortmund (Germany)	4–0	(Portugal) Benfica
Aubameyang 4', 61', 85'; Pulisic 59'	Report

Westfalenstadion, Dortmund
Attendance: 65,849
Referee: Martin Atkinson (England)

Borussia Dortmund won 4–1 on aggregate.

15 February 2017
20:45

Bayern Munich (Germany)	5–1	(England) Arsenal
Robben 11'; Lewandowski 53'; Thiago 56', 63'; Müller 88'	Report	Sánchez 30'

Allianz Arena, Munich
Attendance: 70,000
Referee: Milorad Mažić (Serbia)
7 March 2017
20:45 (19:45 UTC+0)

Arsenal (England)	1–5	(Germany) Bayern Munich
Walcott 20'	Report	Lewandowski 55' (pen.); Robben 68'; Douglas Costa 78'; Vidal 80', 85'

Emirates Stadium, London
Attendance: 59,911
Referee: Anastasios Sidiropoulos (Greece)

Bayern Munich won 10–2 on aggregate.

22 February 2017
20:45 (19:45 UTC+0)

Porto (Portugal)	0–2	(Italy) Juventus
	Report	Pjaca 72'; Dani Alves 74'

Estádio do Dragão, Porto
Attendance: 49,229
Referee: Felix Brych (Germany)
14 March 2017
20:45

Juventus (Italy)	1–0	(Portugal) Porto
Dybala 42' (pen.)	Report

Juventus Stadium, Turin
Attendance: 41,161
Referee: Ovidiu Hațegan (Romania)

Juventus won 3–0 on aggregate.

21 February 2017
20:45

Bayer Leverkusen (Germany)	2–4	(Spain) Atlético Madrid
Bellarabi 48'; Savić 68' (o.g.)	Report	Saúl 17'; Griezmann 25'; Gameiro 59' (pen.); Torres 86'

BayArena, Leverkusen
Attendance: 29,300
Referee: Willie Collum (Scotland)
15 March 2017
20:45

Atlético Madrid (Spain)	0–0	(Germany) Bayer Leverkusen
	Report

Vicente Calderón, Madrid
Attendance: 49,133
Referee: Sergei Karasev (Russia)

Atlético Madrid won 4–2 on aggregate.

14 February 2017
20:45

Paris Saint-Germain (France)	4–0	(Spain) Barcelona
Di María 18', 55'; Draxler 40'; Cavani 72'	Report

Parc des Princes, Paris
Attendance: 46,484
Referee: Szymon Marciniak (Poland)
8 March 2017
20:45

Barcelona (Spain)	6–1	(France) Paris Saint-Germain
L. Suárez 3'; Kurzawa 40' (o.g.); Messi 50' (pen.); Neymar 88', 90+1' (pen.); Roberto 90+5'	Report	Cavani 62'

Camp Nou, Barcelona
Attendance: 96,290
Referee: Deniz Aytekin (Germany)

Barcelona won 6–5 on aggregate.

22 February 2017
20:45

Sevilla (Spain)	2–1	(England) Leicester City
Sarabia 25'; Correa 62'	Report	Vardy 73'

Ramón Sánchez Pizjuán, Seville
Attendance: 38,834
Referee: Clément Turpin (France)
14 March 2017
20:45 (19:45 UTC+0)

Leicester City (England)	2–0	(Spain) Sevilla
Morgan 27'; Albrighton 54'	Report

King Power Stadium, Leicester
Attendance: 31,520
Referee: Daniele Orsato (Italy)

Leicester City won 3–2 on aggregate.

== Quarter-finals ==
The draw was held on 17 March 2017. The first legs were played on 11 and 12 April, and the second legs were played on 18 and 19 April 2017.

=== Summary ===
Team 1	Agg.	Team 2	1st leg	2nd leg
Atlético Madrid (Spain)	2–1	(England) Leicester City	1–0	1–1
Borussia Dortmund (Germany)	3–6	(France) Monaco	2–3	1–3
Bayern Munich (Germany)	3–6	(Spain) Real Madrid	1–2	2–4 (a.e.t.)
Juventus (Italy)	3–0	(Spain) Barcelona	3–0	0–0

=== Matches ===
12 April 2017
20:45

Atlético Madrid (Spain)	1–0	(England) Leicester City
Griezmann 28' (pen.)	Report

Vicente Calderón, Madrid
Attendance: 51,423
Referee: Jonas Eriksson (Sweden)
18 April 2017
20:45 (19:45 UTC+1)

Leicester City (England)	1–1	(Spain) Atlético Madrid
Vardy 61'	Report	Saúl 26'

King Power Stadium, Leicester
Attendance: 31,548
Referee: Gianluca Rocchi (Italy)

Atlético Madrid won 2–1 on aggregate.

12 April 2017 (Note: The Borussia Dortmund v Monaco match, originally scheduled on 11 April 2017, 20:45, was postponed to the following day due to explosions close to the Borussia Dortmund team bus.)
18:45

Borussia Dortmund (Germany)	2–3	(France) Monaco
Dembélé 57'; Kagawa 84'	Report	Mbappé 19', 79'; Bender 35' (o.g.)

Westfalenstadion, Dortmund
Attendance: 65,849
Referee: Daniele Orsato (Italy)
19 April 2017
20:50 (Note: The Monaco v Borussia Dortmund match, originally scheduled for 20:45, was delayed to 20:50 due to late team arrival caused by heavy traffic.)

Monaco (France)	3–1	(Germany) Borussia Dortmund
Mbappé 3'; Falcao 17'; Germain 81'	Report	Reus 48'

Stade Louis II, Monaco
Attendance: 17,135
Referee: Damir Skomina (Slovenia)

Monaco won 6–3 on aggregate.

12 April 2017
20:45

Bayern Munich (Germany)	1–2	(Spain) Real Madrid
Vidal 25'	Report	Ronaldo 47', 77'

Allianz Arena, Munich
Attendance: 70,000
Referee: Nicola Rizzoli (Italy)
18 April 2017
20:45

Real Madrid (Spain)	4–2 (a.e.t.)	(Germany) Bayern Munich
Ronaldo 76', 105', 110'; Asensio 112'	Report	Lewandowski 53' (pen.); Ramos 78' (o.g.)

Santiago Bernabéu, Madrid
Attendance: 78,346
Referee: Viktor Kassai (Hungary)

Real Madrid won 6–3 on aggregate.

11 April 2017
20:45

Juventus (Italy)	3–0	(Spain) Barcelona
Dybala 7', 22'; Chiellini 55'	Report

Juventus Stadium, Turin
Attendance: 41,092
Referee: Szymon Marciniak (Poland)
19 April 2017
20:45

Barcelona (Spain)	0–0	(Italy) Juventus
	Report

Camp Nou, Barcelona
Attendance: 96,290
Referee: Björn Kuipers (Netherlands)

Juventus won 3–0 on aggregate.

== Semi-finals ==
The draw was held on 21 April 2017. The first legs were played on 2 and 3 May, and the second legs were played on 9 and 10 May 2017.

=== Summary ===
Team 1	Agg.	Team 2	1st leg	2nd leg
Real Madrid (Spain)	4–2	(Spain) Atlético Madrid	3–0	1–2
Monaco (France)	1–4	(Italy) Juventus	0–2	1–2

=== Matches ===
2 May 2017
20:45

Real Madrid (Spain)	3–0	(Spain) Atlético Madrid
Ronaldo 10', 73', 86'	Report

Santiago Bernabéu, Madrid
Attendance: 77,609
Referee: Martin Atkinson (England)
10 May 2017
20:45

Atlético Madrid (Spain)	2–1	(Spain) Real Madrid
Saúl 12'; Griezmann 16' (pen.)	Report	Isco 42'

Vicente Calderón, Madrid
Attendance: 53,422
Referee: Cüneyt Çakır (Turkey)

Real Madrid won 4–2 on aggregate.

3 May 2017
20:45

Monaco (France)	0–2	(Italy) Juventus
	Report	Higuaín 29', 59'

Stade Louis II, Monaco
Attendance: 16,762
Referee: Antonio Mateu Lahoz (Spain)
9 May 2017
20:45

Juventus (Italy)	2–1	(France) Monaco
Mandžukić 33'; Dani Alves 44'	Report	Mbappé 69'

Juventus Stadium, Turin
Attendance: 40,244
Referee: Björn Kuipers (Netherlands)

Juventus won 4–1 on aggregate.

== Final ==
The final was played on 3 June 2017 at Millennium Stadium in Cardiff, Wales. The "home" team (for administrative purposes) was determined by an additional draw held after the semi-final draw.

3 June 2017
20:45 (19:45 UTC+1)

Juventus (Italy)	1–4	(Spain) Real Madrid
Mandžukić 27'	Report	Ronaldo 20', 64'; Casemiro 61'; Asensio 90'

Millennium Stadium, Cardiff
Attendance: 65,842
Referee: Felix Brych (Germany)
