= 2016–17 UEFA Champions League group stage =

International football competition

The 2016–17 UEFA Champions League group stage began on 13 September and ended on 7 December 2016. A total of 32 teams competed in the group stage to decide the 16 places in the knockout phase of the 2016–17 UEFA Champions League.

== Draw ==
The draw was held on 25 August 2016, 18:00 CEST, at the Grimaldi Forum in Monaco. The 32 teams were drawn into eight groups of four, with the restriction that teams from the same association could not be drawn against each other. For the draw, the teams were seeded into four pots based on the following principles:

- Pot 1 contained the title holders and the champions of the top seven associations based on their 2015 UEFA country coefficients.
- Pots 2, 3 and 4 contained the remaining teams, seeded based on their 2016 UEFA club coefficients.

Moreover, the draw was controlled for teams from the same association in order to split the teams evenly into the two sets of groups (A–D, E–H) for maximum television coverage.

The fixtures were decided after the draw. On each matchday, four groups play their matches on Tuesday, while the other four groups play their matches on Wednesday, with the two sets of groups (A–D, E–H) alternating between each matchday. There are other restrictions: for example, teams from the same city (e.g., Real Madrid and Atlético Madrid) in general do not play at home on the same matchday (UEFA tries to avoid teams from the same city playing at home on the same day or on consecutive days, due to logistics and crowd control), and teams in certain countries (e.g., Belarus, Russia, Kazakhstan) do not play at home on the last matchday (due to cold weather and simultaneous kick-off times).

On 17 July 2014, the UEFA emergency panel ruled that Ukrainian and Russian clubs would not be drawn against each other "until further notice" due to the political unrest between the countries. Therefore, Ukrainian club Dynamo Kyiv (Pot 3) and Russian clubs CSKA Moscow (Pot 1) and Rostov (Pot 4) could not be drawn into the same group.

== Teams ==
Below are the participating teams (with their 2016 UEFA club coefficients), grouped by their seeding pot. They included 22 teams which entered in this stage, and the 10 winners of the play-off round (5 in Champions Route, 5 in League Route).

Key to colours
Group winners and runners-up advanced to the round of 16
Third-placed teams entered the Europa League round of 32

Pot 1 (by association rank)
Assoc.	Team	Notes	Coeff
—	(Spain) Real Madrid		176.142
1	(Spain) Barcelona		159.142
2	(England) Leicester City		15.256
3	(Germany) Bayern Munich		163.035
4	(Italy) Juventus		107.087
5	(Portugal) Benfica		116.616
6	(France) Paris Saint-Germain		112.549
7	(Russia) CSKA Moscow		48.716

Pot 2
Team	Notes	Coeff
(Spain) Atlético Madrid		144.142
(Germany) Borussia Dortmund		110.035
(England) Arsenal		105.256
(England) Manchester City		99.256
(Spain) Sevilla		95.642
(Portugal) Porto		92.616
(Italy) Napoli		90.087
(Germany) Bayer Leverkusen		89.035

Pot 3
Team	Notes	Coeff
(Switzerland) Basel		87.755
(England) Tottenham Hotspur		74.256
(Ukraine) Dynamo Kyiv		65.976
(France) Lyon		63.049
(Netherlands) PSV Eindhoven		57.112
(Portugal) Sporting CP		51.616
(Belgium) Club Brugge		43.000
(Germany) Borussia Mönchengladbach		42.035

Pot 4
Team	Notes	Coeff
(Scotland) Celtic		40.460
(France) Monaco		36.549
(Turkey) Beşiktaş		34.920
(Poland) Legia Warsaw		28.000
(Croatia) Dinamo Zagreb		25.775
(Bulgaria) Ludogorets Razgrad		25.625
(Denmark) Copenhagen		24.720
(Russia) Rostov		11.716

Notes

1. ^{TH} Title holders, automatically placed at the top position of seeding list.
2. ^{EL} Europa League title holders, qualified automatically
3. ^{CR} Winners of the play-off round (Champions Route).
4. ^{LR} Winners of the play-off round (League Route).

== Format ==
In each group, teams played against each other home-and-away in a round-robin format. The group winners and runners-up advanced to the round of 16, while the third-placed teams entered the Europa League round of 32.

=== Tiebreakers ===
The teams were ranked according to points (3 points for a win, 1 point for a draw, 0 points for a loss). If two or more teams were equal on points on completion of the group matches, the following criteria were applied in the order given to determine the rankings (regulations Article 17.01):

1. higher number of points obtained in the group matches played among the teams in question;
2. superior goal difference from the group matches played among the teams in question;
3. higher number of goals scored in the group matches played among the teams in question;
4. higher number of goals scored away from home in the group matches played among the teams in question;
5. if, after having applied criteria 1 to 4, teams still had an equal ranking, criteria 1 to 4 were reapplied exclusively to the matches between the teams in question to determine their final rankings. If this procedure did not lead to a decision, criteria 6 to 12 applied;
6. superior goal difference in all group matches;
7. higher number of goals scored in all group matches;
8. higher number of away goals scored in all group matches;
9. higher number of wins in all group matches;
10. higher number of away wins in all group matches;
11. lower disciplinary points total based only on yellow and red cards received in all group matches (red card = 3 points, yellow card = 1 point, expulsion for two yellow cards in one match = 3 points);
12. higher club coefficient.

== Groups ==
The matchdays were 13–14 September, 27–28 September, 18–19 October, 1–2 November, 22–23 November, and 6–7 December 2016. The match kickoff times are 20:45 CEST/CET, except for matchday 5 in Russia which are 18:00 CET. The match kickoff times for matchdays 4 and 5 in Turkey were changed from 20:45 CET to 18:45 CET due to the decision of the Turkish government to use the UTC+3 time zone all year round starting from September 2016.

Times are CET/CEST, (Note: CET (UTC+1) for matches in 1 November to 7 December 2016, and CEST (UTC+2) for matches in 13 September to 19 October 2016.) as listed by UEFA (local times, if different, are in parentheses).

=== Group A ===
Pos	Team	Pld	W	D	L	GF	GA	GD	Pts	Qualification	ARS	PAR	LUD	BSL
1	(England) Arsenal	6	4	2	0	18	6	+12	14	Advance to knockout phase	—	2–2	6–0	2–0
2	(France) Paris Saint-Germain	6	3	3	0	13	7	+6	12	Advance to knockout phase	1–1	—	2–2	3–0
3	(Bulgaria) Ludogorets Razgrad	6	0	3	3	6	15	−9	3	Transfer to Europa League	2–3	1–3	—	0–0
4	(Switzerland) Basel	6	0	2	4	3	12	−9	2		1–4	1–2	1–1	—

Source: UEFA
Rules for classification: Group stage tiebreakers
13 September 2016
20:45

Paris Saint-Germain (France)	1–1	(England) Arsenal
Cavani 1'	Report	Sánchez 78'

Parc des Princes, Paris
Attendance: 46,440
Referee: Viktor Kassai (Hungary)
13 September 2016
20:45

Basel (Switzerland)	1–1	(Bulgaria) Ludogorets Razgrad
Steffen 79'	Report	Cafu 45'

St. Jakob-Park, Basel
Attendance: 30,852
Referee: Aleksei Kulbakov (Belarus)

28 September 2016
20:45 (21:45 UTC+3)

Ludogorets Razgrad (Bulgaria)	1–3	(France) Paris Saint-Germain
Natanael 16'	Report	Matuidi 41'; Cavani 56', 60'

Vasil Levski National Stadium, Sofia (Note: Ludogorets Razgrad played their home matches at Vasil Levski National Stadium, Sofia, instead of their regular stadium Ludogorets Arena, Razgrad.)
Attendance: 17,155
Referee: Pavel Královec (Czech Republic)
28 September 2016
20:45 (19:45 UTC+1)

Arsenal (England)	2–0	(Switzerland) Basel
Walcott 7', 26'	Report

Emirates Stadium, London
Attendance: 59,993
Referee: Danny Makkelie (Netherlands)

19 October 2016
20:45 (19:45 UTC+1)

Arsenal (England)	6–0	(Bulgaria) Ludogorets Razgrad
Sánchez 13'; Walcott 42'; Oxlade-Chamberlain 47'; Özil 56', 83', 87'	Report

Emirates Stadium, London
Attendance: 59,944
Referee: Artur Soares Dias (Portugal)
19 October 2016
20:45

Paris Saint-Germain (France)	3–0	(Switzerland) Basel
Di María 40'; Lucas 62'; Cavani 90+3' (pen.)	Report

Parc des Princes, Paris
Attendance: 46,488
Referee: Deniz Aytekin (Germany)

1 November 2016
20:45 (21:45 UTC+2)

Ludogorets Razgrad (Bulgaria)	2–3	(England) Arsenal
Cafu 12'; Keșerü 15'	Report	Xhaka 20'; Giroud 42'; Özil 88'

Vasil Levski National Stadium, Sofia
Attendance: 30,862
Referee: Bas Nijhuis (Netherlands)
1 November 2016
20:45

Basel (Switzerland)	1–2	(France) Paris Saint-Germain
Zuffi 76'	Report	Matuidi 43'; Meunier 90'

St. Jakob-Park, Basel
Attendance: 34,639
Referee: Ovidiu Hațegan (Romania)

23 November 2016
20:45 (19:45 UTC+0)

Arsenal (England)	2–2	(France) Paris Saint-Germain
Giroud 45+1' (pen.); Verratti 60' (o.g.)	Report	Cavani 18'; Iwobi 77' (o.g.)

Emirates Stadium, London
Attendance: 59,628
Referee: Felix Brych (Germany)
23 November 2016
20:45 (21:45 UTC+2)

Ludogorets Razgrad (Bulgaria)	0–0	(Switzerland) Basel
	Report

Vasil Levski National Stadium, Sofia
Attendance: 20,821
Referee: Martin Atkinson (England)

6 December 2016
20:45

Paris Saint-Germain (France)	2–2	(Bulgaria) Ludogorets Razgrad
Cavani 61'; Di María 90+2'	Report	Misidjan 15'; Wanderson 69'

Parc des Princes, Paris
Attendance: 42,650
Referee: Anastasios Sidiropoulos (Greece)
6 December 2016
20:45

Basel (Switzerland)	1–4	(England) Arsenal
Doumbia 78'	Report	Pérez 8', 16', 47'; Iwobi 53'

St. Jakob-Park, Basel
Attendance: 36,000
Referee: Jorge Sousa (Portugal)

=== Group B ===
Pos	Team	Pld	W	D	L	GF	GA	GD	Pts	Qualification	NAP	BEN	BES	DKV
1	(Italy) Napoli	6	3	2	1	11	8	+3	11	Advance to knockout phase	—	4–2	2–3	0–0
2	(Portugal) Benfica	6	2	2	2	10	10	0	8	Advance to knockout phase	1–2	—	1–1	1–0
3	(Turkey) Beşiktaş	6	1	4	1	9	14	−5	7	Transfer to Europa League	1–1	3–3	—	1–1
4	(Ukraine) Dynamo Kyiv	6	1	2	3	8	6	+2	5		1–2	0–2	6–0	—

Source: UEFA
Rules for classification: Group stage tiebreakers
13 September 2016
20:45 (21:45 UTC+3)

Dynamo Kyiv (Ukraine)	1–2	(Italy) Napoli
Harmash 26'	Report	Milik 36', 45+2'

Olympic Stadium, Kyiv
Attendance: 35,137
Referee: Willie Collum (Scotland)
13 September 2016
20:45 (19:45 UTC+1)

Benfica (Portugal)	1–1	(Turkey) Beşiktaş
Cervi 12'	Report	Talisca 90+3'

Estádio da Luz, Lisbon
Attendance: 42,126
Referee: Milorad Mažić (Serbia)

28 September 2016
20:45 (21:45 UTC+3)

Beşiktaş (Turkey)	1–1	(Ukraine) Dynamo Kyiv
Quaresma 29'	Report	Tsyhankov 65'

Vodafone Park, Istanbul
Attendance: 33,938
Referee: Felix Zwayer (Germany)
28 September 2016
20:45

Napoli (Italy)	4–2	(Portugal) Benfica
Hamšík 20'; Mertens 51', 58'; Milik 54' (pen.)	Report	Guedes 70'; Salvio 86'

Stadio San Paolo, Naples
Attendance: 41,281
Referee: Felix Brych (Germany)

19 October 2016
20:45

Napoli (Italy)	2–3	(Turkey) Beşiktaş
Mertens 30'; Gabbiadini 69' (pen.)	Report	Adriano 12'; Aboubakar 38', 86'

Stadio San Paolo, Naples
Attendance: 28,502
Referee: Sergei Karasev (Russia)
19 October 2016
20:45 (21:45 UTC+3)

Dynamo Kyiv (Ukraine)	0–2	(Portugal) Benfica
	Report	Salvio 9' (pen.); Cervi 55'

Olympic Stadium, Kyiv
Attendance: 25,991
Referee: David Fernández Borbalán (Spain)

1 November 2016
18:45 (20:45 UTC+3)

Beşiktaş (Turkey)	1–1	(Italy) Napoli
Quaresma 79' (pen.)	Report	Hamšík 82'

Vodafone Park, Istanbul
Attendance: 35,552
Referee: Mark Clattenburg (England)
1 November 2016
20:45 (19:45 UTC+0)

Benfica (Portugal)	1–0	(Ukraine) Dynamo Kyiv
Salvio 45+2' (pen.)	Report

Estádio da Luz, Lisbon
Attendance: 51,641
Referee: Clément Turpin (France)

23 November 2016
18:45 (20:45 UTC+3)

Beşiktaş (Turkey)	3–3	(Portugal) Benfica
Tosun 58'; Quaresma 83' (pen.); Aboubakar 89'	Report	Guedes 10'; Semedo 25'; Fejsa 31'

Vodafone Park, Istanbul
Attendance: 36,063
Referee: Damir Skomina (Slovenia)
23 November 2016
20:45

Napoli (Italy)	0–0	(Ukraine) Dynamo Kyiv
	Report

Stadio San Paolo, Naples
Attendance: 33,736
Referee: Ovidiu Hațegan (Romania)

6 December 2016
20:45 (21:45 UTC+2)

Dynamo Kyiv (Ukraine)	6–0	(Turkey) Beşiktaş
Besyedin 9'; Yarmolenko 30' (pen.); Buyalskyi 32'; González 45+3'; Sydorchuk 60'; Moraes 77'	Report

Olympic Stadium, Kyiv
Attendance: 14,036
Referee: Craig Thomson (Scotland)
6 December 2016
20:45 (19:45 UTC+0)

Benfica (Portugal)	1–2	(Italy) Napoli
Jiménez 87'	Report	Callejón 60'; Mertens 79'

Estádio da Luz, Lisbon
Attendance: 55,634
Referee: Antonio Mateu Lahoz (Spain)

=== Group C ===
Pos	Team	Pld	W	D	L	GF	GA	GD	Pts	Qualification	BAR	MCI	BMG	CEL
1	(Spain) Barcelona	6	5	0	1	20	4	+16	15	Advance to knockout phase	—	4–0	4–0	7–0
2	(England) Manchester City	6	2	3	1	12	10	+2	9	Advance to knockout phase	3–1	—	4–0	1–1
3	(Germany) Borussia Mönchengladbach	6	1	2	3	5	12	−7	5	Transfer to Europa League	1–2	1–1	—	1–1
4	(Scotland) Celtic	6	0	3	3	5	16	−11	3		0–2	3–3	0–2	—

Source: UEFA
Rules for classification: Group stage tiebreakers
13 September 2016
20:45

Barcelona (Spain)	7–0	(Scotland) Celtic
Messi 3', 27', 60'; Neymar 50'; Iniesta 59'; L. Suárez 75', 88'	Report

Camp Nou, Barcelona
Attendance: 73,290
Referee: Ovidiu Hațegan (Romania)
14 September 2016 (Note: The Manchester City v Borussia Mönchengladbach match, originally scheduled on 13 September 2016, 20:45 (19:45 UTC+1), was postponed to the following day due to adverse weather conditions.)
20:45 (19:45 UTC+1)

Manchester City (England)	4–0	(Germany) Borussia Mönchengladbach
Agüero 9', 28' (pen.), 77'; Iheanacho 90+1'	Report

City of Manchester Stadium, Manchester
Attendance: 30,270
Referee: Björn Kuipers (Netherlands)

28 September 2016
20:45

Borussia Mönchengladbach (Germany)	1–2	(Spain) Barcelona
Hazard 34'	Report	Turan 65'; Piqué 74'

Borussia-Park, Mönchengladbach
Attendance: 46,283
Referee: Damir Skomina (Slovenia)
28 September 2016
20:45 (19:45 UTC+1)

Celtic (Scotland)	3–3	(England) Manchester City
Dembélé 3', 47'; Sterling 20' (o.g.)	Report	Fernandinho 12'; Sterling 28'; Nolito 55'

Celtic Park, Glasgow
Attendance: 57,592
Referee: Nicola Rizzoli (Italy)

19 October 2016
20:45 (19:45 UTC+1)

Celtic (Scotland)	0–2	(Germany) Borussia Mönchengladbach
	Report	Stindl 57'; Hahn 77'

Celtic Park, Glasgow
Attendance: 57,814
Referee: Anastasios Sidiropoulos (Greece)
19 October 2016
20:45

Barcelona (Spain)	4–0	(England) Manchester City
Messi 17', 61', 69'; Neymar 89'	Report

Camp Nou, Barcelona
Attendance: 96,290
Referee: Milorad Mažić (Serbia)

1 November 2016
20:45

Borussia Mönchengladbach (Germany)	1–1	(Scotland) Celtic
Stindl 32'	Report	Dembélé 76' (pen.)

Borussia-Park, Mönchengladbach
Attendance: 46,283
Referee: Jorge Sousa (Portugal)
1 November 2016
20:45 (19:45 UTC+0)

Manchester City (England)	3–1	(Spain) Barcelona
Gündoğan 39', 74'; De Bruyne 51'	Report	Messi 21'

City of Manchester Stadium, Manchester
Attendance: 53,340
Referee: Viktor Kassai (Hungary)

23 November 2016
20:45 (19:45 UTC+0)

Celtic (Scotland)	0–2	(Spain) Barcelona
	Report	Messi 24', 56' (pen.)

Celtic Park, Glasgow
Attendance: 57,937
Referee: Daniele Orsato (Italy)
23 November 2016
20:45

Borussia Mönchengladbach (Germany)	1–1	(England) Manchester City
Raffael 23'	Report	Silva 45+1'

Borussia-Park, Mönchengladbach
Attendance: 45,921
Referee: Cüneyt Çakır (Turkey)

6 December 2016
20:45

Barcelona (Spain)	4–0	(Germany) Borussia Mönchengladbach
Messi 16'; Turan 50', 53', 67'	Report

Camp Nou, Barcelona
Attendance: 67,157
Referee: Sergei Karasev (Russia)
6 December 2016
20:45 (19:45 UTC+0)

Manchester City (England)	1–1	(Scotland) Celtic
Iheanacho 8'	Report	Roberts 4'

City of Manchester Stadium, Manchester
Attendance: 51,297
Referee: Slavko Vinčić (Slovenia)

=== Group D ===
Pos	Team	Pld	W	D	L	GF	GA	GD	Pts	Qualification	ATM	BAY	RST	PSV
1	(Spain) Atlético Madrid	6	5	0	1	7	2	+5	15	Advance to knockout phase	—	1–0	2–1	2–0
2	(Germany) Bayern Munich	6	4	0	2	14	6	+8	12	Advance to knockout phase	1–0	—	5–0	4–1
3	(Russia) Rostov	6	1	2	3	6	12	−6	5	Transfer to Europa League	0–1	3–2	—	2–2
4	(Netherlands) PSV Eindhoven	6	0	2	4	4	11	−7	2		0–1	1–2	0–0	—

Source: UEFA
Rules for classification: Group stage tiebreakers
13 September 2016
20:45

Bayern Munich (Germany)	5–0	(Russia) Rostov
Lewandowski 28' (pen.); Müller 45+2'; Kimmich 53', 60'; Bernat 90'	Report

Allianz Arena, Munich
Attendance: 70,000
Referee: Anthony Taylor (England)
13 September 2016
20:45

PSV Eindhoven (Netherlands)	0–1	(Spain) Atlético Madrid
	Report	Saúl 43'

Philips Stadion, Eindhoven
Attendance: 33,989
Referee: Martin Atkinson (England)

28 September 2016
20:45

Atlético Madrid (Spain)	1–0	(Germany) Bayern Munich
Carrasco 35'	Report

Vicente Calderón, Madrid
Attendance: 48,242
Referee: Szymon Marciniak (Poland)
28 September 2016
20:45 (21:45 UTC+3)

Rostov (Russia)	2–2	(Netherlands) PSV Eindhoven
Poloz 8', 37'	Report	Pröpper 14'; L. de Jong 45+1'

Olimp-2, Rostov-on-Don
Attendance: 12,646
Referee: Clément Turpin (France)

19 October 2016
20:45 (21:45 UTC+3)

Rostov (Russia)	0–1	(Spain) Atlético Madrid
	Report	Carrasco 62'

Olimp-2, Rostov-on-Don
Attendance: 15,400
Referee: Daniele Orsato (Italy)
19 October 2016
20:45

Bayern Munich (Germany)	4–1	(Netherlands) PSV Eindhoven
Müller 13'; Kimmich 21'; Lewandowski 59'; Robben 84'	Report	Narsingh 41'

Allianz Arena, Munich
Attendance: 70,000
Referee: Willie Collum (Scotland)

1 November 2016
20:45

Atlético Madrid (Spain)	2–1	(Russia) Rostov
Griezmann 28', 90+3'	Report	Azmoun 30'

Vicente Calderón, Madrid
Attendance: 40,392
Referee: Craig Thomson (Scotland)
1 November 2016
20:45

PSV Eindhoven (Netherlands)	1–2	(Germany) Bayern Munich
Arias 14'	Report	Lewandowski 34' (pen.), 74'

Philips Stadion, Eindhoven
Attendance: 35,000
Referee: Gianluca Rocchi (Italy)

23 November 2016
18:00 (20:00 UTC+3)

Rostov (Russia)	3–2	(Germany) Bayern Munich
Azmoun 44'; Poloz 50' (pen.); Noboa 67'	Report	Douglas Costa 35'; Bernat 52'

Olimp-2, Rostov-on-Don
Attendance: 15,211
Referee: Artur Soares Dias (Portugal)
23 November 2016
20:45

Atlético Madrid (Spain)	2–0	(Netherlands) PSV Eindhoven
Gameiro 55'; Griezmann 66'	Report

Vicente Calderón, Madrid
Attendance: 37,891
Referee: Aleksei Kulbakov (Belarus)

6 December 2016
20:45

Bayern Munich (Germany)	1–0	(Spain) Atlético Madrid
Lewandowski 28'	Report

Allianz Arena, Munich
Attendance: 70,000
Referee: Clément Turpin (France)
6 December 2016
20:45

PSV Eindhoven (Netherlands)	0–0	(Russia) Rostov
	Report

Philips Stadion, Eindhoven
Attendance: 33,400
Referee: Deniz Aytekin (Germany)

=== Group E ===
Pos	Team	Pld	W	D	L	GF	GA	GD	Pts	Qualification	MON	LEV	TOT	CSKA
1	(France) Monaco	6	3	2	1	9	7	+2	11	Advance to knockout phase	—	1–1	2–1	3–0
2	(Germany) Bayer Leverkusen	6	2	4	0	8	4	+4	10	Advance to knockout phase	3–0	—	0–0	2–2
3	(England) Tottenham Hotspur	6	2	1	3	6	6	0	7	Transfer to Europa League	1–2	0–1	—	3–1
4	(Russia) CSKA Moscow	6	0	3	3	5	11	−6	3		1–1	1–1	0–1	—

Source: UEFA
Rules for classification: Group stage tiebreakers
14 September 2016
20:45

Bayer Leverkusen (Germany)	2–2	(Russia) CSKA Moscow
Mehmedi 9'; Çalhanoğlu 15'	Report	Dzagoev 36'; Eremenko 38'

BayArena, Leverkusen
Attendance: 23,459
Referee: Daniele Orsato (Italy)
14 September 2016
20:45 (19:45 UTC+1)

Tottenham Hotspur (England)	1–2	(France) Monaco
Alderweireld 45'	Report	Silva 15'; Lemar 31'

Wembley Stadium, London (Note: Tottenham Hotspur played their home matches at Wembley Stadium, London, instead of their regular stadium White Hart Lane, London, due to renovation.)
Attendance: 85,011
Referee: Gianluca Rocchi (Italy)

27 September 2016
20:45

Monaco (France)	1–1	(Germany) Bayer Leverkusen
Glik 90+4'	Report	Hernández 74'

Stade Louis II, Monaco
Attendance: 8,100
Referee: David Fernández Borbalán (Spain)
27 September 2016
20:45 (21:45 UTC+3)

CSKA Moscow (Russia)	0–1	(England) Tottenham Hotspur
	Report	Son Heung-min 71'

Arena CSKA, Moscow
Attendance: 26,153
Referee: Antonio Mateu Lahoz (Spain)

18 October 2016
20:45 (21:45 UTC+3)

CSKA Moscow (Russia)	1–1	(France) Monaco
Traoré 34'	Report	Silva 87'

Arena CSKA, Moscow
Attendance: 24,125
Referee: Martin Strömbergsson (Sweden)
18 October 2016
20:45

Bayer Leverkusen (Germany)	0–0	(England) Tottenham Hotspur
	Report

BayArena, Leverkusen
Attendance: 28,887
Referee: Cüneyt Çakır (Turkey)

2 November 2016
20:45

Monaco (France)	3–0	(Russia) CSKA Moscow
Germain 13'; Falcao 29', 41'	Report

Stade Louis II, Monaco
Attendance: 10,029
Referee: Matej Jug (Slovenia)
2 November 2016
20:45 (19:45 UTC+0)

Tottenham Hotspur (England)	0–1	(Germany) Bayer Leverkusen
	Report	Kampl 65'

Wembley Stadium, London
Attendance: 85,512
Referee: Jonas Eriksson (Sweden)

22 November 2016
18:00 (20:00 UTC+3)

CSKA Moscow (Russia)	1–1	(Germany) Bayer Leverkusen
Natcho 76' (pen.)	Report	Volland 16'

Arena CSKA, Moscow
Attendance: 19,164
Referee: Alberto Undiano Mallenco (Spain)
22 November 2016
20:45

Monaco (France)	2–1	(England) Tottenham Hotspur
Sidibé 48'; Lemar 53'	Report	Kane 52' (pen.)

Stade Louis II, Monaco
Attendance: 13,100
Referee: Björn Kuipers (Netherlands)

7 December 2016
20:45

Bayer Leverkusen (Germany)	3–0	(France) Monaco
Yurchenko 30'; Brandt 48'; De Sanctis 82' (o.g.)	Report

BayArena, Leverkusen
Attendance: 21,928
Referee: Gediminas Mažeika (Lithuania)
7 December 2016
20:45 (19:45 UTC+0)

Tottenham Hotspur (England)	3–1	(Russia) CSKA Moscow
Alli 38'; Kane 45+1'; Akinfeev 77' (o.g.)	Report	Dzagoev 33'

Wembley Stadium, London
Attendance: 62,034
Referee: Nicola Rizzoli (Italy)

=== Group F ===
Pos	Team	Pld	W	D	L	GF	GA	GD	Pts	Qualification	DOR	RMA	LEG	SPO
1	(Germany) Borussia Dortmund	6	4	2	0	21	9	+12	14	Advance to knockout phase	—	2–2	8–4	1–0
2	(Spain) Real Madrid	6	3	3	0	16	10	+6	12	Advance to knockout phase	2–2	—	5–1	2–1
3	(Poland) Legia Warsaw	6	1	1	4	9	24	−15	4	Transfer to Europa League	0–6	3–3	—	1–0
4	(Portugal) Sporting CP	6	1	0	5	5	8	−3	3		1–2	1–2	2–0	—

Source: UEFA
Rules for classification: Group stage tiebreakers
14 September 2016
20:45

Real Madrid (Spain)	2–1	(Portugal) Sporting CP
Ronaldo 89'; Morata 90+4'	Report	Bruno César 48'

Santiago Bernabéu, Madrid
Attendance: 72,179
Referee: Paolo Tagliavento (Italy)
14 September 2016
20:45

Legia Warsaw (Poland)	0–6	(Germany) Borussia Dortmund
	Report	Götze 7'; Papastathopoulos 15'; Bartra 17'; Guerreiro 51'; Castro 76'; Aubameyang 87'

Polish Army Stadium, Warsaw
Attendance: 27,304
Referee: Sergei Karasev (Russia)

27 September 2016
20:45

Borussia Dortmund (Germany)	2–2	(Spain) Real Madrid
Aubameyang 43'; Schürrle 87'	Report	Ronaldo 17'; Varane 68'

Westfalenstadion, Dortmund
Attendance: 65,849
Referee: Mark Clattenburg (England)
27 September 2016
20:45 (19:45 UTC+1)

Sporting CP (Portugal)	2–0	(Poland) Legia Warsaw
B. Ruiz 28'; Dost 37'	Report

Estádio José Alvalade, Lisbon
Attendance: 40,094
Referee: Michael Oliver (England)

18 October 2016
20:45 (19:45 UTC+1)

Sporting CP (Portugal)	1–2	(Germany) Borussia Dortmund
Bruno César 67'	Report	Aubameyang 9'; Weigl 43'

Estádio José Alvalade, Lisbon
Attendance: 46,609
Referee: Damir Skomina (Slovenia)
18 October 2016
20:45

Real Madrid (Spain)	5–1	(Poland) Legia Warsaw
Bale 16'; Jodłowiec 20' (o.g.); Asensio 37'; Vázquez 68'; Morata 84'	Report	Radović 22' (pen.)

Santiago Bernabéu, Madrid
Attendance: 70,251
Referee: Ruddy Buquet (France)

2 November 2016
20:45

Borussia Dortmund (Germany)	1–0	(Portugal) Sporting CP
Ramos 12'	Report

Westfalenstadion, Dortmund
Attendance: 65,849
Referee: Danny Makkelie (Netherlands)
2 November 2016
20:45

Legia Warsaw (Poland)	3–3	(Spain) Real Madrid
Odjidja-Ofoe 40'; Radović 58'; Moulin 83'	Report	Bale 1'; Benzema 35'; Kovačić 85'

Polish Army Stadium, Warsaw
Attendance: 0 (Note: The Legia Warsaw v Real Madrid match was played behind closed doors due to punishment by UEFA.)
Referee: Pavel Královec (Czech Republic)

22 November 2016
20:45 (19:45 UTC+0)

Sporting CP (Portugal)	1–2	(Spain) Real Madrid
Silva 80' (pen.)	Report	Varane 29'; Benzema 87'

Estádio José Alvalade, Lisbon
Attendance: 50,046
Referee: Willie Collum (Scotland)
22 November 2016
20:45

Borussia Dortmund (Germany)	8–4	(Poland) Legia Warsaw
Kagawa 17', 18'; Şahin 20'; Dembélé 29'; Reus 32', 52'; Passlack 81'; Rzeźniczak 90+2' (o.g.)	Report	Prijović 10', 24'; Kucharczyk 57'; Nikolić 83'

Westfalenstadion, Dortmund
Attendance: 55,094
Referee: Martin Strömbergsson (Sweden)

7 December 2016
20:45

Real Madrid (Spain)	2–2	(Germany) Borussia Dortmund
Benzema 28', 53'	Report	Aubameyang 60'; Reus 88'

Santiago Bernabéu, Madrid
Attendance: 76,894
Referee: Szymon Marciniak (Poland)
7 December 2016
20:45

Legia Warsaw (Poland)	1–0	(Portugal) Sporting CP
Guilherme 30'	Report

Polish Army Stadium, Warsaw
Attendance: 28,232
Referee: Gianluca Rocchi (Italy)

=== Group G ===
Pos	Team	Pld	W	D	L	GF	GA	GD	Pts	Qualification	LEI	POR	CPH	BRU
1	(England) Leicester City	6	4	1	1	7	6	+1	13	Advance to knockout phase	—	1–0	1–0	2–1
2	(Portugal) Porto	6	3	2	1	9	3	+6	11	Advance to knockout phase	5–0	—	1–1	1–0
3	(Denmark) Copenhagen	6	2	3	1	7	2	+5	9	Transfer to Europa League	0–0	0–0	—	4–0
4	(Belgium) Club Brugge	6	0	0	6	2	14	−12	0		0–3	1–2	0–2	—

Source: UEFA
Rules for classification: Group stage tiebreakers
14 September 2016
20:45

Club Brugge (Belgium)	0–3	(England) Leicester City
	Report	Albrighton 5'; Mahrez 29', 61' (pen.)

Jan Breydel Stadium, Bruges
Attendance: 20,970
Referee: Anastasios Sidiropoulos (Greece)
14 September 2016
20:45 (19:45 UTC+1)

Porto (Portugal)	1–1	(Denmark) Copenhagen
Otávio 13'	Report	Cornelius 52'

Estádio do Dragão, Porto
Attendance: 34,325
Referee: Matej Jug (Slovenia)

27 September 2016
20:45

Copenhagen (Denmark)	4–0	(Belgium) Club Brugge
Denswil 53' (o.g.); Delaney 64'; Santander 69'; Jørgensen 90+2'	Report

Parken Stadium, Copenhagen
Attendance: 25,605
Referee: Craig Thomson (Scotland)
27 September 2016
20:45 (19:45 UTC+1)

Leicester City (England)	1–0	(Portugal) Porto
Slimani 25'	Report

King Power Stadium, Leicester
Attendance: 31,805
Referee: Cüneyt Çakır (Turkey)

18 October 2016
20:45 (19:45 UTC+1)

Leicester City (England)	1–0	(Denmark) Copenhagen
Mahrez 40'	Report

King Power Stadium, Leicester
Attendance: 31,037
Referee: Nicola Rizzoli (Italy)
18 October 2016
20:45

Club Brugge (Belgium)	1–2	(Portugal) Porto
Vossen 12'	Report	Layún 68'; Silva 90+3' (pen.)

Jan Breydel Stadium, Bruges
Attendance: 23,325
Referee: Paolo Tagliavento (Italy)

2 November 2016
20:45

Copenhagen (Denmark)	0–0	(England) Leicester City
	Report

Parken Stadium, Copenhagen
Attendance: 34,146
Referee: Felix Brych (Germany)
2 November 2016
20:45 (19:45 UTC+0)

Porto (Portugal)	1–0	(Belgium) Club Brugge
Silva 37'	Report

Estádio do Dragão, Porto
Attendance: 32,310
Referee: Alberto Undiano Mallenco (Spain)

22 November 2016
20:45 (19:45 UTC+0)

Leicester City (England)	2–1	(Belgium) Club Brugge
Okazaki 5'; Mahrez 30' (pen.)	Report	Izquierdo 52'

King Power Stadium, Leicester
Attendance: 31,443
Referee: Ruddy Buquet (France)
22 November 2016
20:45

Copenhagen (Denmark)	0–0	(Portugal) Porto
	Report

Parken Stadium, Copenhagen
Attendance: 32,036
Referee: Milorad Mažić (Serbia)

7 December 2016
20:45

Club Brugge (Belgium)	0–2	(Denmark) Copenhagen
	Report	Mechele 8' (o.g.); Jørgensen 15'

Jan Breydel Stadium, Bruges
Attendance: 18,981
Referee: Michael Oliver (England)
7 December 2016
20:45 (19:45 UTC+0)

Porto (Portugal)	5–0	(England) Leicester City
Silva 6', 64' (pen.); Corona 26'; Brahimi 44'; Jota 77'	Report

Estádio do Dragão, Porto
Attendance: 39,310
Referee: Felix Zwayer (Germany)

=== Group H ===
Pos	Team	Pld	W	D	L	GF	GA	GD	Pts	Qualification	JUV	SEV	LYO	DZG
1	(Italy) Juventus	6	4	2	0	11	2	+9	14	Advance to knockout phase	—	0–0	1–1	2–0
2	(Spain) Sevilla	6	3	2	1	7	3	+4	11	Advance to knockout phase	1–3	—	1–0	4–0
3	(France) Lyon	6	2	2	2	5	3	+2	8	Transfer to Europa League	0–1	0–0	—	3–0
4	(Croatia) Dinamo Zagreb	6	0	0	6	0	15	−15	0		0–4	0–1	0–1	—

Source: UEFA
Rules for classification: Group stage tiebreakers
14 September 2016
20:45

Lyon (France)	3–0	(Croatia) Dinamo Zagreb
Tolisso 13'; Ferri 49'; Cornet 57'	Report

Parc Olympique Lyonnais, Décines-Charpieu
Attendance: 43,754
Referee: Martin Strömbergsson (Sweden)
14 September 2016
20:45

Juventus (Italy)	0–0	(Spain) Sevilla
	Report

Juventus Stadium, Turin
Attendance: 33,261
Referee: Deniz Aytekin (Germany)

27 September 2016
20:45

Sevilla (Spain)	1–0	(France) Lyon
Ben Yedder 53'	Report

Ramón Sánchez Pizjuán, Seville
Attendance: 36,741
Referee: Bas Nijhuis (Netherlands)
27 September 2016
20:45

Dinamo Zagreb (Croatia)	0–4	(Italy) Juventus
	Report	Pjanić 24'; Higuaín 31'; Dybala 57'; Dani Alves 85'

Stadion Maksimir, Zagreb
Attendance: 23,875
Referee: Jorge Sousa (Portugal)

18 October 2016
20:45

Dinamo Zagreb (Croatia)	0–1	(Spain) Sevilla
	Report	Nasri 37'

Stadion Maksimir, Zagreb
Attendance: 6,021
Referee: Michael Oliver (England)
18 October 2016
20:45

Lyon (France)	0–1	(Italy) Juventus
	Report	Cuadrado 76'

Parc Olympique Lyonnais, Décines-Charpieu
Attendance: 53,907
Referee: Szymon Marciniak (Poland)

2 November 2016
20:45

Sevilla (Spain)	4–0	(Croatia) Dinamo Zagreb
Vietto 31'; Escudero 66'; Nzonzi 80'; Ben Yedder 87'	Report

Ramón Sánchez Pizjuán, Seville
Attendance: 35,215
Referee: Felix Zwayer (Germany)
2 November 2016
20:45

Juventus (Italy)	1–1	(France) Lyon
Higuaín 13' (pen.)	Report	Tolisso 85'

Juventus Stadium, Turin
Attendance: 40,356
Referee: Björn Kuipers (Netherlands)

22 November 2016
20:45

Dinamo Zagreb (Croatia)	0–1	(France) Lyon
	Report	Lacazette 72'

Stadion Maksimir, Zagreb
Attendance: 7,834
Referee: Pavel Královec (Czech Republic)
22 November 2016
20:45

Sevilla (Spain)	1–3	(Italy) Juventus
Pareja 9'	Report	Marchisio 45+2' (pen.); Bonucci 84'; Mandžukić 90+4'

Ramón Sánchez Pizjuán, Seville
Attendance: 38,942
Referee: Mark Clattenburg (England)

7 December 2016
20:45

Lyon (France)	0–0	(Spain) Sevilla
	Report

Parc Olympique Lyonnais, Décines-Charpieu
Attendance: 52,423
Referee: Jonas Eriksson (Sweden)
7 December 2016
20:45

Juventus (Italy)	2–0	(Croatia) Dinamo Zagreb
Higuaín 52'; Rugani 73'	Report

Juventus Stadium, Turin
Attendance: 39,380
Referee: Anthony Taylor (England)
