= 2016–17 UEFA Europa League knockout phase =

International football competition

The 2016–17 UEFA Europa League knockout phase began on 16 February and ended on 24 May 2017 with the final at Friends Arena in Solna, Sweden, to decide the champions of the 2016–17 UEFA Europa League. A total of 32 teams competed in the knockout phase.

Times up to 25 March 2017 (round of 32 and round of 16) were CET (UTC+1), thereafter (quarter-finals and beyond) times were CEST (UTC+2).

== Round and draw dates ==
The schedule of the competition was as follows (all draws were held at the UEFA headquarters in Nyon, Switzerland, unless stated otherwise).

Round	Draw date and time	First leg	Second leg
Round of 32	12 December 2016, 13:00	16 February 2017	23 February 2017
Round of 16	24 February 2017, 13:00	9 March 2017	16 March 2017
Quarter-finals	17 March 2017, 13:00	13 April 2017	20 April 2017
Semi-finals	21 April 2017, 13:00	4 May 2017	11 May 2017
Final	21 April 2017, 13:00	24 May 2017 at Friends Arena, Solna	

Matches could also be played on Tuesdays or Wednesdays instead of the regular Thursdays due to scheduling conflicts.

== Format ==
The knockout phase involved 32 teams: the 24 teams which qualified as winners and runners-up of each of the twelve groups in the group stage, and the eight third-placed teams from the Champions League group stage.

Each tie in the knockout phase, apart from the final, was played over two legs, with each team playing one leg at home. The team that scored more goals on aggregate over the two legs advanced to the next round. If the aggregate score was level, the away goals rule was applied, i.e. the team that scored more goals away from home over the two legs advanced. If away goals were also equal, then thirty minutes of extra time was played. The away goals rule was again applied after extra time, i.e. if there were goals scored during extra time and the aggregate score was still level, the visiting team advanced by virtue of more away goals scored. If no goals were scored during extra time, the tie was decided by penalty shoot-out. In the final, which was played as a single match, if scores were level at the end of normal time, extra time was played, followed by penalty shoot-out if scores remained tied.

The mechanism of the draws for each round was as follows:

- In the draw for the round of 32, the twelve group winners and the four third-placed teams from the Champions League group stage with the better group records were seeded, and the twelve group runners-up and the other four third-placed teams from the Champions League group stage were unseeded. The seeded teams were drawn against the unseeded teams, with the seeded teams hosting the second leg. Teams from the same group or the same association could not be drawn against each other.
- In the draws for the round of 16 onwards, there were no seedings, and teams from the same group or the same association could be drawn against each other.

On 17 July 2014, the UEFA emergency panel ruled that Ukrainian and Russian clubs would not be drawn against each other "until further notice" due to the political unrest between the countries.

== Qualified teams ==
=== Europa League group stage winners and runners-up ===
Group	Winners (Seeded in round of 32 draw)	Runners-up (Unseeded in round of 32 draw)
A	(Turkey) Fenerbahçe	(England) Manchester United
B	(Cyprus) APOEL	(Greece) Olympiacos
C	(France) Saint-Étienne	(Belgium) Anderlecht
D	(Russia) Zenit Saint Petersburg	(Netherlands) AZ
E	(Italy) Roma	(Romania) Astra Giurgiu
F	(Belgium) Genk	(Spain) Athletic Bilbao
G	(Netherlands) Ajax	(Spain) Celta Vigo
H	(Ukraine) Shakhtar Donetsk	(Belgium) Gent
I	(Germany) Schalke 04	(Russia) Krasnodar
J	(Italy) Fiorentina	(Greece) PAOK
K	(Czech Republic) Sparta Prague	(Israel) Hapoel Be'er Sheva
L	(Turkey) Osmanlıspor	(Spain) Villarreal

=== Champions League group stage third-placed teams ===
Pos	Grp	Team	Pld	W	D	L	GF	GA	GD	Pts	Seeding
1	G	(Denmark) Copenhagen	6	2	3	1	7	2	+5	9	Seeded in round of 32 draw
2	H	(France) Lyon	6	2	2	2	5	3	+2	8	Seeded in round of 32 draw
3	E	(England) Tottenham Hotspur	6	2	1	3	6	6	0	7	Seeded in round of 32 draw
4	B	(Turkey) Beşiktaş	6	1	4	1	9	14	−5	7	Seeded in round of 32 draw
5	D	(Russia) Rostov	6	1	2	3	6	12	−6	5	Unseeded in round of 32 draw
6	C	(Germany) Borussia Mönchengladbach	6	1	2	3	5	12	−7	5	Unseeded in round of 32 draw
7	F	(Poland) Legia Warsaw	6	1	1	4	9	24	−15	4	Unseeded in round of 32 draw
8	A	(Bulgaria) Ludogorets Razgrad	6	0	3	3	6	15	−9	3	Unseeded in round of 32 draw

Source: UEFA
Rules for classification: 1) Points; 2) Goal difference; 3) Goals scored; 4) Away goals scored; 5) Wins; 6) Away wins; 7) Disciplinary points; 8) Club coefficient (regulations Article 16.04).

== Bracket ==
Round of 32
(Bulgaria) Ludogorets Razgrad	1	0	1
(Denmark) Copenhagen	2	0	2
(Poland) Legia Warsaw	0	0	0
(Netherlands) Ajax	0	1	1
(Greece) PAOK	0	1	1
(Germany) Schalke 04	3	1	4
(Germany) Borussia Mönchengladbach	0	4	4
(Italy) Fiorentina	1	2	3
(Netherlands) AZ	1	1	2
(France) Lyon	4	7	11
(Spain) Villarreal	0	1	1
(Italy) Roma	4	0	4
(Greece) Olympiacos	0	3	3
(Turkey) Osmanlıspor	0	0	0
(Israel) Hapoel Be'er Sheva	1	1	2
(Turkey) Beşiktaş	3	2	5
(Spain) Celta Vigo (a.e.t.)	0	2	2
(Ukraine) Shakhtar Donetsk	1	0	1
(Russia) Krasnodar	1	1	2
(Turkey) Fenerbahçe	0	1	1
(Belgium) Gent	1	2	3
(England) Tottenham Hotspur	0	2	2
(Romania) Astra Giurgiu	2	0	2
(Belgium) Genk	2	1	3
(Spain) Athletic Bilbao	3	0	3
(Cyprus) APOEL	2	2	4
(Belgium) Anderlecht (a)	2	1	3
(Russia) Zenit Saint Petersburg	0	3	3
(Russia) Rostov	4	1	5
(Czech Republic) Sparta Prague	0	1	1
(England) Manchester United	3	1	4
(France) Saint-Étienne	0	0	0

Round of 16
(Denmark) Copenhagen	2	0	2
(Netherlands) Ajax	1	2	3
(Germany) Schalke 04 (a)	1	2	3
(Germany) Borussia Mönchengladbach	1	2	3
(France) Lyon	4	1	5
(Italy) Roma	2	2	4
(Greece) Olympiacos	1	1	2
(Turkey) Beşiktaş	1	4	5
(Spain) Celta Vigo	2	2	4
(Russia) Krasnodar	1	0	1
(Belgium) Gent	2	1	3
(Belgium) Genk	5	1	6
(Cyprus) APOEL	0	0	0
(Belgium) Anderlecht	1	1	2
(Russia) Rostov	1	0	1
(England) Manchester United	1	1	2

Quarter-finals
(Netherlands) Ajax (a.e.t.)	2	2	4
(Germany) Schalke 04	0	3	3
(France) Lyon (p)	2	1	3 (7)
(Turkey) Beşiktaş	1	2	3 (6)
(Spain) Celta Vigo	3	1	4
(Belgium) Genk	2	1	3
(Belgium) Anderlecht	1	1	2
(England) Manchester United (a.e.t.)	1	2	3

Semi-finals
(Netherlands) Ajax	4	1	5
(France) Lyon	1	3	4
(Spain) Celta Vigo	0	1	1
(England) Manchester United	1	1	2

Final
24 May – Solna
(Netherlands) Ajax	0
(England) Manchester United	2

== Round of 32 ==
The draw was held on 12 December 2016. The first legs were played on 16 February, and the second legs were played on 22 and 23 February 2017.

=== Summary ===
Team 1	Agg.	Team 2	1st leg	2nd leg
Athletic Bilbao (Spain)	3–4	(Cyprus) APOEL	3–2	0–2
Legia Warsaw (Poland)	0–1	(Netherlands) Ajax	0–0	0–1
Anderlecht (Belgium)	3–3 (a)	(Russia) Zenit Saint Petersburg	2–0	1–3
Astra Giurgiu (Romania)	2–3	(Belgium) Genk	2–2	0–1
Manchester United (England)	4–0	(France) Saint-Étienne	3–0	1–0
Villarreal (Spain)	1–4	(Italy) Roma	0–4	1–0
Ludogorets Razgrad (Bulgaria)	1–2	(Denmark) Copenhagen	1–2	0–0
Celta Vigo (Spain)	2–1	(Ukraine) Shakhtar Donetsk	0–1	2–0 (a.e.t.)
Olympiacos (Greece)	3–0	(Turkey) Osmanlıspor	0–0	3–0
Gent (Belgium)	3–2	(England) Tottenham Hotspur	1–0	2–2
Rostov (Russia)	5–1	(Czech Republic) Sparta Prague	4–0	1–1
Krasnodar (Russia)	2–1	(Turkey) Fenerbahçe	1–0	1–1
Borussia Mönchengladbach (Germany)	4–3	(Italy) Fiorentina	0–1	4–2
AZ (Netherlands)	2–11	(France) Lyon	1–4	1–7
Hapoel Be'er Sheva (Israel)	2–5	(Turkey) Beşiktaş	1–3	1–2
PAOK (Greece)	1–4	(Germany) Schalke 04	0–3	1–1

=== Matches ===
16 February 2017
21:05

Athletic Bilbao (Spain)	3–2	(Cyprus) APOEL
Merkis 38' (o.g.); Aduriz 61'; Williams 72'	Report	Efrem 36'; Gianniotas 89'

San Mamés, Bilbao
Attendance: 32,675
Referee: Jonas Eriksson (Sweden)
23 February 2017
19:00

APOEL (Cyprus)	2–0	(Spain) Athletic Bilbao
Sotiriou 46'; Gianniotas 54' (pen.)	Report

GSP Stadium, Nicosia
Attendance: 15,275
Referee: Vladislav Bezborodov (Russia)

APOEL won 4–3 on aggregate.

16 February 2017
21:05

Legia Warsaw (Poland)	0–0	(Netherlands) Ajax
	Report

Polish Army Stadium, Warsaw
Attendance: 28,742
Referee: David Fernández Borbalán (Spain)
23 February 2017
19:00

Ajax (Netherlands)	1–0	(Poland) Legia Warsaw
Viergever 49'	Report

Amsterdam Arena, Amsterdam
Attendance: 52,285
Referee: Anthony Taylor (England)

Ajax won 1–0 on aggregate.

16 February 2017
21:05

Anderlecht (Belgium)	2–0	(Russia) Zenit Saint Petersburg
Acheampong 5', 31'	Report

Constant Vanden Stock Stadium, Brussels
Attendance: 13,415
Referee: Michael Oliver (England)
23 February 2017
19:00

Zenit Saint Petersburg (Russia)	3–1	(Belgium) Anderlecht
Giuliano 24', 78'; Dzyuba 72'	Report	Kiese Thelin 90'

Petrovsky Stadium, Saint Petersburg
Attendance: 17,992
Referee: Anastasios Sidiropoulos (Greece)

3–3 on aggregate; Anderlecht won on away goals.

16 February 2017
19:00

Astra Giurgiu (Romania)	2–2	(Belgium) Genk
Budescu 43'; Seto 90'	Report	Castagne 25'; Trossard 83'

Stadionul Marin Anastasovici, Giurgiu
Attendance: 3,775
Referee: Svein Oddvar Moen (Norway)
23 February 2017
21:05

Genk (Belgium)	1–0	(Romania) Astra Giurgiu
Pozuelo 67'	Report

Luminus Arena, Genk
Attendance: 8,804
Referee: Serdar Gözübüyük (Netherlands)

Genk won 3–2 on aggregate.

16 February 2017
21:05

Manchester United (England)	3–0	(France) Saint-Étienne
Ibrahimović 15', 75', 88' (pen.)	Report

Old Trafford, Manchester
Attendance: 67,192
Referee: Pavel Královec (Czech Republic)
22 February 2017
18:00

Saint-Étienne (France)	0–1	(England) Manchester United
	Report	Mkhitaryan 17'

Stade Geoffroy-Guichard, Saint-Étienne
Attendance: 41,492
Referee: Deniz Aytekin (Germany)

Manchester United won 4–0 on aggregate.

16 February 2017
21:05

Villarreal (Spain)	0–4	(Italy) Roma
	Report	Emerson 32'; Džeko 65', 79', 86'

Estadio de la Cerámica, Villarreal
Attendance: 17,960
Referee: Danny Makkelie (Netherlands)
23 February 2017
19:00

Roma (Italy)	0–1	(Spain) Villarreal
	Report	Borré 15'

Stadio Olimpico, Rome
Attendance: 19,495
Referee: Felix Zwayer (Germany)

Roma won 4–1 on aggregate.

16 February 2017
19:00

Ludogorets Razgrad (Bulgaria)	1–2	(Denmark) Copenhagen
Keșerü 81'	Report	Anicet 2' (o.g.); Toutouh 53'

Vasil Levski National Stadium, Sofia (Note: Ludogorets Razgrad played their home match at Vasil Levski National Stadium, Sofia, instead of their regular stadium Ludogorets Arena, Razgrad.)
Attendance: 14,500
Referee: Ivan Bebek (Croatia)
23 February 2017
21:05

Copenhagen (Denmark)	0–0	(Bulgaria) Ludogorets Razgrad
	Report

Parken Stadium, Copenhagen
Attendance: 17,064
Referee: Miroslav Zelinka (Czech Republic)

Copenhagen won 2–1 on aggregate.

16 February 2017
19:00

Celta Vigo (Spain)	0–1	(Ukraine) Shakhtar Donetsk
	Report	Leschuk 27'

Balaídos, Vigo
Attendance: 18,318
Referee: Gediminas Mažeika (Lithuania)
23 February 2017
21:05

Shakhtar Donetsk (Ukraine)	0–2 (a.e.t.)	(Spain) Celta Vigo
	Report	Aspas 90+1' (pen.); Cabral 108'

Metalist Stadium, Kharkiv (Note: Shakhtar Donetsk played their home match at Metalist Stadium, Kharkiv, instead of their regular stadium Donbas Arena, Donetsk, due to the war conditions in Eastern Ukraine.)
Attendance: 33,117
Referee: Slavko Vinčić (Slovenia)

Celta Vigo won 2–1 on aggregate.

16 February 2017
19:00

Olympiacos (Greece)	0–0	(Turkey) Osmanlıspor
	Report

Karaiskakis Stadium, Piraeus
Attendance: 24,478
Referee: Ruddy Buquet (France)
23 February 2017
17:00

Osmanlıspor (Turkey)	0–3	(Greece) Olympiacos
	Report	Ansarifard 47', 86'; Elyounoussi 70'

Osmanlı Stadyumu, Ankara
Attendance: 17,500
Referee: István Vad (Hungary)

Olympiacos won 3–0 on aggregate.

16 February 2017
19:00

Gent (Belgium)	1–0	(England) Tottenham Hotspur
Perbet 59'	Report

Ghelamco Arena, Ghent
Attendance: 19,267
Referee: Benoît Bastien (France)
23 February 2017
21:05

Tottenham Hotspur (England)	2–2	(Belgium) Gent
Eriksen 10'; Wanyama 61'	Report	Kane 20' (o.g.); Perbet 82'

Wembley Stadium, London (Note: Tottenham Hotspur played their home match at Wembley Stadium, London, instead of their regular stadium White Hart Lane, London, due to renovation.)
Attendance: 80,465
Referee: Jorge Sousa (Portugal)

Gent won 3–2 on aggregate.

16 February 2017
19:00

Rostov (Russia)	4–0	(Czech Republic) Sparta Prague
Mevlja 15'; Poloz 38'; Noboa 40'; Azmoun 68'	Report

Olimp-2, Rostov-on-Don
Attendance: 6,160
Referee: Bas Nijhuis (Netherlands)
23 February 2017
21:05

Sparta Prague (Czech Republic)	1–1	(Russia) Rostov
Karavayev 84'	Report	Poloz 13'

Generali Arena, Prague
Attendance: 13,413
Referee: Hüseyin Göçek (Turkey)

Rostov won 5–1 on aggregate.

16 February 2017
17:00

Krasnodar (Russia)	1–0	(Turkey) Fenerbahçe
Claesson 4'	Report

Krasnodar Stadium, Krasnodar
Attendance: 32,460
Referee: Ivan Kružliak (Slovakia)
22 February 2017
18:00

Fenerbahçe (Turkey)	1–1	(Russia) Krasnodar
Souza 41'	Report	Smolov 7'

Şükrü Saracoğlu Stadium, Istanbul
Attendance: 21,788
Referee: Paweł Raczkowski (Poland)

Krasnodar won 2–1 on aggregate.

16 February 2017
19:00

Borussia Mönchengladbach (Germany)	0–1	(Italy) Fiorentina
	Report	Bernardeschi 44'

Borussia-Park, Mönchengladbach
Attendance: 41,863
Referee: Jesús Gil Manzano (Spain)
23 February 2017
21:05

Fiorentina (Italy)	2–4	(Germany) Borussia Mönchengladbach
Kalinić 16'; Valero 29'	Report	Stindl 44' (pen.), 47', 55'; Christensen 60'

Stadio Artemio Franchi, Florence
Attendance: 24,712
Referee: Artur Soares Dias (Portugal)

Borussia Mönchengladbach won 4–3 on aggregate.

16 February 2017
19:00

AZ (Netherlands)	1–4	(France) Lyon
Jahanbakhsh 68' (pen.)	Report	Tousart 26'; Lacazette 45+2', 57'; Ferri 90+5'

AFAS Stadion, Alkmaar
Attendance: 16,098
Referee: Bobby Madden (Scotland)
23 February 2017
21:05

Lyon (France)	7–1	(Netherlands) AZ
Fekir 5', 27', 78'; Cornet 17'; Darder 34'; Aouar 87'; Diakhaby 89'	Report	García 26'

Parc Olympique Lyonnais, Décines-Charpieu
Attendance: 25,743
Referee: Aleksei Kulbakov (Belarus)

Lyon won 11–2 on aggregate.

16 February 2017
21:05

Hapoel Be'er Sheva (Israel)	1–3	(Turkey) Beşiktaş
Barda 44'	Report	Soares 42' (o.g.); Tosun 60'; Hutchinson 90+3'

Turner Stadium, Be'er Sheva
Attendance: 15,347
Referee: Martin Atkinson (England)
23 February 2017
19:00

Beşiktaş (Turkey)	2–1	(Israel) Hapoel Be'er Sheva
Aboubakar 17'; Tosun 87'	Report	Nwakaeme 64'

Vodafone Arena, Istanbul
Attendance: 27,892
Referee: Matej Jug (Slovenia)

Beşiktaş won 5–2 on aggregate.

16 February 2017
21:05

PAOK (Greece)	0–3	(Germany) Schalke 04
	Report	Burgstaller 27'; Meyer 81'; Huntelaar 89'

Toumba Stadium, Thessaloniki
Attendance: 25,593
Referee: Xavier Estrada Fernández (Spain)
22 February 2017
18:00

Schalke 04 (Germany)	1–1	(Greece) PAOK
Schöpf 23'	Report	Nastasić 25' (o.g.)

Veltins-Arena, Gelsenkirchen
Attendance: 50,619
Referee: Luca Banti (Italy)

Schalke 04 won 4–1 on aggregate.

== Round of 16 ==
The draw was held on 24 February 2017. The first legs were played on 9 March, and the second legs were played on 16 March 2017.

=== Summary ===
Team 1	Agg.	Team 2	1st leg	2nd leg
Celta Vigo (Spain)	4–1	(Russia) Krasnodar	2–1	2–0
APOEL (Cyprus)	0–2	(Belgium) Anderlecht	0–1	0–1
Schalke 04 (Germany)	3–3 (a)	(Germany) Borussia Mönchengladbach	1–1	2–2
Lyon (France)	5–4	(Italy) Roma	4–2	1–2
Rostov (Russia)	1–2	(England) Manchester United	1–1	0–1
Olympiacos (Greece)	2–5	(Turkey) Beşiktaş	1–1	1–4
Gent (Belgium)	3–6	(Belgium) Genk	2–5	1–1
Copenhagen (Denmark)	2–3	(Netherlands) Ajax	2–1	0–2

=== Matches ===
9 March 2017
21:05

Celta Vigo (Spain)	2–1	(Russia) Krasnodar
Wass 50'; Beauvue 90'	Report	Claesson 56'

Balaídos, Vigo
Attendance: 18,414
Referee: Craig Thomson (Scotland)
16 March 2017
19:00

Krasnodar (Russia)	0–2	(Spain) Celta Vigo
	Report	Mallo 52'; Aspas 80'

Krasnodar Stadium, Krasnodar
Attendance: 33,318
Referee: Ruddy Buquet (France)

Celta Vigo won 4–1 on aggregate.

9 March 2017
19:00

APOEL (Cyprus)	0–1	(Belgium) Anderlecht
	Report	Stanciu 29'

GSP Stadium, Nicosia
Attendance: 19,327
Referee: Jorge Sousa (Portugal)
16 March 2017
21:05

Anderlecht (Belgium)	1–0	(Cyprus) APOEL
Acheampong 65'	Report

Constant Vanden Stock Stadium, Brussels
Attendance: 15,662
Referee: Aleksei Kulbakov (Belarus)

Anderlecht won 2–0 on aggregate.

9 March 2017
21:05

Schalke 04 (Germany)	1–1	(Germany) Borussia Mönchengladbach
Burgstaller 25'	Report	Hofmann 15'

Veltins-Arena, Gelsenkirchen
Attendance: 52,412
Referee: Björn Kuipers (Netherlands)
16 March 2017
21:05

Borussia Mönchengladbach (Germany)	2–2	(Germany) Schalke 04
Christensen 26'; Dahoud 45+2'	Report	Goretzka 54'; Bentaleb 68' (pen.)

Borussia-Park, Mönchengladbach
Attendance: 46,283
Referee: Mark Clattenburg (England)

3–3 on aggregate; Schalke 04 won on away goals.

9 March 2017
21:05

Lyon (France)	4–2	(Italy) Roma
Diakhaby 8'; Tolisso 47'; Fekir 74'; Lacazette 90+2'	Report	Salah 20'; Fazio 33'

Parc Olympique Lyonnais, Décines-Charpieu
Attendance: 50,588
Referee: Anthony Taylor (England)
16 March 2017
21:05

Roma (Italy)	2–1	(France) Lyon
Strootman 17'; Tousart 60' (o.g.)	Report	Diakhaby 16'

Stadio Olimpico, Rome
Attendance: 46,453
Referee: Viktor Kassai (Hungary)

Lyon won 5–4 on aggregate.

9 March 2017
19:00

Rostov (Russia)	1–1	(England) Manchester United
Bukharov 53'	Report	Mkhitaryan 35'

Olimp-2, Rostov-on-Don
Attendance: 14,223
Referee: Felix Zwayer (Germany)
16 March 2017
21:05

Manchester United (England)	1–0	(Russia) Rostov
Mata 70'	Report

Old Trafford, Manchester
Attendance: 64,361
Referee: Gediminas Mažeika (Lithuania)

Manchester United won 2–1 on aggregate.

9 March 2017
21:05

Olympiacos (Greece)	1–1	(Turkey) Beşiktaş
Cambiasso 36'	Report	Aboubakar 53'

Karaiskakis Stadium, Piraeus
Attendance: 25,515
Referee: Danny Makkelie (Netherlands)
16 March 2017
19:00

Beşiktaş (Turkey)	4–1	(Greece) Olympiacos
Aboubakar 10'; Babel 22', 75'; Tosun 84'	Report	Elyounoussi 31'

Vodafone Park, Istanbul
Attendance: 37,966
Referee: Michael Oliver (England)

Beşiktaş won 5–2 on aggregate.

9 March 2017
21:05

Gent (Belgium)	2–5	(Belgium) Genk
Kalu 27'; Coulibaly 61'	Report	Malinovskyi 21'; Colley 33'; Samatta 41', 72'; Uronen 45+2'

Ghelamco Arena, Ghent
Attendance: 17,112
Referee: Paolo Tagliavento (Italy)
16 March 2017
19:00

Genk (Belgium)	1–1	(Belgium) Gent
Castagne 20'	Report	L. Verstraete 84'

Luminus Arena, Genk
Attendance: 16,028
Referee: Alberto Undiano Mallenco (Spain)

Genk won 6–3 on aggregate.

9 March 2017
19:00

Copenhagen (Denmark)	2–1	(Netherlands) Ajax
Falk 1'; Cornelius 60'	Report	Dolberg 32'

Parken Stadium, Copenhagen
Attendance: 31,189
Referee: Artur Soares Dias (Portugal)
16 March 2017
21:05

Ajax (Netherlands)	2–0	(Denmark) Copenhagen
Traoré 23'; Dolberg 45+2' (pen.)	Report

Amsterdam Arena, Amsterdam
Attendance: 52,270
Referee: Ivan Kružliak (Slovakia)

Ajax won 3–2 on aggregate.

== Quarter-finals ==
The draw was held on 17 March 2017. The first legs were played on 13 April, and the second legs were played on 20 April 2017.

=== Summary ===
Team 1	Agg.	Team 2	1st leg	2nd leg
Anderlecht (Belgium)	2–3	(England) Manchester United	1–1	1–2 (a.e.t.)
Celta Vigo (Spain)	4–3	(Belgium) Genk	3–2	1–1
Ajax (Netherlands)	4–3	(Germany) Schalke 04	2–0	2–3 (a.e.t.)
Lyon (France)	3–3 (7–6 p)	(Turkey) Beşiktaş	2–1	1–2 (a.e.t.)

=== Matches ===
13 April 2017
21:05

Anderlecht (Belgium)	1–1	(England) Manchester United
Dendoncker 86'	Report	Mkhitaryan 37'

Constant Vanden Stock Stadium, Brussels
Attendance: 20,060
Referee: Felix Brych (Germany)
20 April 2017
21:05

Manchester United (England)	2–1 (a.e.t.)	(Belgium) Anderlecht
Mkhitaryan 10'; Rashford 107'	Report	Hanni 32'

Old Trafford, Manchester
Attendance: 71,496
Referee: Alberto Undiano Mallenco (Spain)

Manchester United won 3–2 on aggregate.

13 April 2017
21:05

Celta Vigo (Spain)	3–2	(Belgium) Genk
Sisto 15'; Aspas 18'; Guidetti 38'	Report	Boëtius 10'; Buffel 67'

Balaídos, Vigo
Attendance: 21,608
Referee: Clément Turpin (France)
20 April 2017
21:05

Genk (Belgium)	1–1	(Spain) Celta Vigo
Trossard 67'	Report	Sisto 63'

Luminus Arena, Genk
Attendance: 18,833
Referee: Willie Collum (Scotland)

Celta Vigo won 4–3 on aggregate.

13 April 2017
21:05

Ajax (Netherlands)	2–0	(Germany) Schalke 04
Klaassen 23' (pen.), 52'	Report

Amsterdam Arena, Amsterdam
Attendance: 52,384
Referee: Sergei Karasev (Russia)
20 April 2017
21:05

Schalke 04 (Germany)	3–2 (a.e.t.)	(Netherlands) Ajax
Goretzka 53'; Burgstaller 56'; Caligiuri 101'	Report	Viergever 111'; Younes 120'

Veltins-Arena, Gelsenkirchen
Attendance: 53,701
Referee: Ovidiu Hațegan (Romania)

Ajax won 4–3 on aggregate.

13 April 2017
21:50 (Note: The Lyon v Beşiktaş match, originally scheduled for 21:05, was delayed to 21:50 due to crowd disturbances.)

Lyon (France)	2–1	(Turkey) Beşiktaş
Tolisso 83'; Morel 85'	Report	Babel 15'

Parc Olympique Lyonnais, Décines-Charpieu
Attendance: 55,452
Referee: Antonio Mateu Lahoz (Spain)
20 April 2017
21:05

Beşiktaş (Turkey)	2–1 (a.e.t.)	(France) Lyon
Talisca 27', 58'	Report	Lacazette 34'
Penalties
Babel (penalty scored); Tosun (penalty scored); Hutchinson (penalty scored); Arslan (penalty scored); Talisca (penalty scored); Uysal (penalty scored); Tošić (penalty missed); Mitrović (penalty missed)	6–7	(penalty scored) Fekir; (penalty scored) Tolisso; (penalty scored) Ghezzal; (penalty scored) Rybus; (penalty scored) Valbuena; (penalty scored) Diakhaby; (penalty missed) Jallet; (penalty scored) Gonalons

Vodafone Arena, Istanbul
Attendance: 39,623
Referee: Milorad Mažić (Serbia)

3–3 on aggregate; Lyon won 7–6 on penalties.

== Semi-finals ==
The draw was held on 21 April 2017. The first legs were played on 3 and 4 May, and the second legs were played on 11 May 2017.

=== Summary ===
Team 1	Agg.	Team 2	1st leg	2nd leg
Ajax (Netherlands)	5–4	(France) Lyon	4–1	1–3
Celta Vigo (Spain)	1–2	(England) Manchester United	0–1	1–1

=== Matches ===
3 May 2017 (Note: The Ajax v Lyon match was scheduled on a Wednesday, as the Remembrance of the Dead took place in Amsterdam on 4 May.)
18:45

Ajax (Netherlands)	4–1	(France) Lyon
Traoré 25', 71'; Dolberg 34'; Younes 49'	Report	Valbuena 66'

Amsterdam Arena, Amsterdam
Attendance: 52,141
Referee: Gianluca Rocchi (Italy)
11 May 2017
21:05

Lyon (France)	3–1	(Netherlands) Ajax
Lacazette 45' (pen.), 45+1'; Ghezzal 81'	Report	Dolberg 27'

Parc Olympique Lyonnais, Décines-Charpieu
Attendance: 53,810
Referee: Szymon Marciniak (Poland)

Ajax won 5–4 on aggregate.

4 May 2017
21:05

Celta Vigo (Spain)	0–1	(England) Manchester United
	Report	Rashford 67'

Balaídos, Vigo
Attendance: 26,202
Referee: Sergei Karasev (Russia)
11 May 2017
21:05

Manchester United (England)	1–1	(Spain) Celta Vigo
Fellaini 17'	Report	Roncaglia 85'

Old Trafford, Manchester
Attendance: 75,138
Referee: Ovidiu Hațegan (Romania)

Manchester United won 2–1 on aggregate.

== Final ==
The final was played on 24 May 2017 at Friends Arena in Solna, Sweden. The "home" team (for administrative purposes) was determined by an additional draw held after the semi-final draw.

24 May 2017
20:45

Ajax (Netherlands)	0–2	(England) Manchester United
	Report	Pogba 18'; Mkhitaryan 48'

Friends Arena, Solna
Attendance: 46,961
Referee: Damir Skomina (Slovenia)
