= Croatia at the 2018 FIFA World Cup =

Croatia participated in the 2018 FIFA World Cup. This was their fifth appearance. Croatia managed to reach the final where they lost to France and finished second in the tournament.

== Qualifying ==
Croatia was in Group I of UEFA's World Cup qualifications. They played alongside Iceland, Ukraine, Turkey, Finland and Kosovo. Croatia finished as runner-up in the group and entered the second-round play-offs where the team beat Greece and qualified for the 2018 FIFA World Cup.

Croatia national team was led by manager Ante Čačić until 7 October 2017 when he was, due to a series of bad results, replaced by Zlatko Dalić.

Standings

Pos	Team	Pld	W	D	L	GF	GA	GD	Pts	Qualification	Iceland	Croatia	Ukraine	Turkey	Finland	Kosovo
1	Iceland	10	7	1	2	16	7	+9	22	Qualification to 2018 FIFA World Cup	—	1–0	2–0	2–0	3–2	2–0
2	Croatia	10	6	2	2	15	4	+11	20	Advance to second round	2–0	—	1–0	1–1	1–1	1–0
3	Ukraine	10	5	2	3	13	9	+4	17		1–1	0–2	—	2–0	1–0	3–0
4	Turkey	10	4	3	3	14	13	+1	15		0–3	1–0	2–2	—	2–0	2–0
5	Finland	10	2	3	5	9	13	−4	9		1–0	0–1	1–2	2–2	—	1–1
6	Kosovo	10	0	1	9	3	24	−21	1		1–2	0–6	0–2	1–4	0–1	—

Source: FIFA
Rules for classification: Qualification tiebreakers

The results of the group stage

5 September 2016	Croatia	1–1	Turkey	Zagreb, Croatia
20:45 (20:45 UTC+2)	Rakitić 44' (pen.)	Report (FIFA); Report (UEFA)	Çalhanoğlu 45+3'	Stadium: Stadion Maksimir, Zagreb; Attendance: 0 Referee: Szymon Marciniak (Poland)

6 October 2016	Kosovo	0–6	Croatia	Shkodër, Albania
20:45 (UTC+2)		Report (FIFA); Report (UEFA)	Mandžukić 6', 24', 35'; Mitrović 68'; Perišić 83'; Kalinić 90+2'	Stadium: Loro Boriçi Stadium; Attendance: 14,612; Referee: David Fernández Borbalán (Spain)

9 October 2016	Finland	0–1	Croatia	Tampere, Finland
19:00 (UTC+3)		Report (FIFA); Report (UEFA)	Mandžukić 18'	Stadium: Tampere Stadium; Attendance: 15,567; Referee: Ruddy Buquet (France)

12 November 2016	Croatia	2–0	Iceland	Zagreb, Croatia
18:00 (UTC+1)	Brozović 15', 90+1'	Report (FIFA); Report (UEFA)		Stadium: Stadion Maksimir, Zagreb; Attendance: 0 Referee: Gianluca Rocchi (Italy)

24 March 2017	Croatia	1–0	Ukraine	Zagreb, Croatia
20:45 (UTC+1)	Kalinić 38'	Report (FIFA); Report (UEFA)		Stadium: Stadion Maksimir, Zagreb; Attendance: 27,351; Referee: Antonio Mateu Lahoz (Spain)

11 June 2017	Iceland	1–0	Croatia	Reykjavík, Iceland
20:45 (18:45 UTC±0)	Magnússon 90'	Report (FIFA); Report (UEFA)		Stadium: Laugardalsvöllur; Referee: Alberto Undiano Mallenco (Spain)

3 September 2017	Croatia	1–0	Kosovo	Zagreb, Croatia
14:30 (14:30 UTC+2)	Vida 74'	Report (FIFA); Report (UEFA)		Stadium: Stadion Maksimir; Attendance: 6,838; Referee: Stefan Johannesson (Sweden)

5 September 2017	Turkey	1–0	Croatia	Eskişehir, Turkey
20:45 (21:45 UTC+3)	Tosun 75'	Report (FIFA); Report (UEFA)		Stadium: New Eskişehir Stadium; Attendance: 28,600; Referee: Viktor Kassai (Hungary)

6 October 2017	Croatia	1–1	Finland	Rijeka, Croatia
20:45 (20:45 UTC+2)	Mandžukić 57'	Report (FIFA); Report (UEFA)	Soiri 90'	Stadium: Stadion Rujevica; Attendance: 7,578; Referee: Daniel Stefanski (Poland)

9 October 2017	Ukraine	0–2	Croatia	Kyiv, Ukraine
20:45 (21:45 UTC+3)		Report (FIFA); Report (UEFA)	Kramarić 62' 70'	Stadium: Olympic Stadium; Attendance: 60,200; Referee: Felix Brych (Germany)

The results of the second-round play-off

9 November 2017	Croatia	4–1	Greece	Zagreb, Croatia
20:45 (20:45 UTC+2)	Modrić 13' (pen.); N. Kalinić 19'; Perišić 33'; Kramarić 49'	Report (FIFA); Report (UEFA)	Papastathopoulos 30'	Stadium: Stadion Maksimir; Attendance: 30,013; Referee: Gianluca Rocchi (Italy)

12 November 2017	Greece	0–0 (1–4 agg.)	Croatia	Piraeus, Greece
20:45 (21:45 UTC+3)		Report (FIFA); Report (UEFA)		Stadium: Karaiskakis Stadium; Attendance: 18,667; Referee: Björn Kuipers (Netherlands)

=== Players ===
Altogether 26 players appeared in the qualifying matches. Domagoj Vida is the only player that appeared in all 12 matches playing the full 90 minutes of all games. Mario Mandžukić was the top scorer with 5 achieved goals. Filip Bradarić, Duje Ćaleta-Car and Dominik Livaković did not appear in any of the qualifying matches but made the final World Cup squad.

Complete list of players in the qualifying matches

#	Name	Games played	Goals
1	Domagoj Vida	12	1
2	Mario Mandžukić	11	5
2	Marcelo Brozović	11	2
2	Andrej Kramarić	11	3
2	Ivan Perišić	11	1
6	Danijel Subašić	10	0
6	Šime Vrsaljko	10	0
6	Luka Modrić	10	0
9	Nikola Kalinić	9	2
9	Milan Badelj	9	0
9	Josip Pivarić	9	0
12	Ivan Rakitić	8	1
13	Mateo Kovačić	7	0
14	Matej Mitrović	6	1
14	Dejan Lovren	6	0
16	Marko Rog	5	0
17	Duje Čop	4	0
18	Ivan Strinić	3	0
18	Vedran Ćorluka	3	0
18	Mario Pašalić	3	0
21	Lovre Kalinić	2	0
21	Tin Jedvaj	2	0
21	Ante Rebić	2	0
24	Marko Pjaca	1	0
24	Ivan Santini	1	0
24	Nikola Vlašić	1	0

Source: Croatian Football Federation

Player was not selected for the 2018 FIFA World Cup squad

== World Cup preparation ==
23 March 2018 Friendly match	Peru	2–0	Croatia	Miami, United States
01:00 (UTC+1)	Carrillo 12'; Flores 48'; Yoshimar Yotun (yellow card) 57' (yellow-red card) 75'	Report		Stadium: Hard Rock Stadium; Attendance: 46,893; Referee: Ismail Elfath (United States)

27 March 2018 Friendly match	Mexico	0–1	Croatia	Dallas, United States
04:00 (UTC+1)		Report	Rakitić 62' (pen.)	Stadium: AT&T Stadium; Attendance: 79,128; Referee: Mario Alberto Escobar (Guatemala)

3 June 2018 Friendly match	Croatia	0–2	Brazil	Liverpool, England
16:00 (UTC+1)		Report	Neymar 69'; Firmino 90+4'	Stadium: Anfield; Attendance: 36,584; Referee: Michael Oliver (England)

8 June 2018 Friendly match	Croatia	2–1	Senegal	Osijek, Croatia
18:00 (UTC+2)	Perišić 63'; Kramarić 78'	Report	Sarr 48'	Stadium: Stadion Gradski vrt Attendance: 15,998; Referee: Ádám Farkas (Hungary)

== Draw ==
Croatia was drawn into Group D. Croatia's opponents in the first stage were Nigeria, Argentina and Iceland.

=== Squad ===
Coach: Zlatko Dalić

A 32-man preliminary squad was announced on 14 May 2018. The squad was reduced to 24 players on 21 May. The final squad was announced on 4 June.

No.	Pos.	Player	Date of birth (age)	Caps	Goals	Club
1	GK	Dominik Livaković	9 January 1995 (aged 23)	1	0	(Croatian Football Federation) Dinamo Zagreb
2	DF	Šime Vrsaljko	10 January 1992 (aged 26)	35	0	(Royal Spanish Football Federation) Atlético Madrid
3	DF	Ivan Strinić	17 July 1987 (aged 30)	43	0	(Italian Football Federation) Sampdoria
4	FW	Ivan Perišić	2 February 1989 (aged 29)	66	18	(Italian Football Federation) Inter Milan
5	DF	Vedran Ćorluka	5 February 1986 (aged 32)	99	4	(Russian Football Union) Lokomotiv Moscow
6	DF	Dejan Lovren	5 July 1989 (aged 28)	39	2	(The Football Association) Liverpool
7	MF	Ivan Rakitić	10 March 1988 (aged 30)	92	14	(Royal Spanish Football Federation) Barcelona
8	MF	Mateo Kovačić	6 May 1994 (aged 24)	41	1	(Royal Spanish Football Federation) Real Madrid
9	FW	Andrej Kramarić	19 June 1991 (aged 26)	31	9	(German Football Association) 1899 Hoffenheim
10	MF	Luka Modrić (captain)	9 September 1985 (aged 32)	106	12	(Royal Spanish Football Federation) Real Madrid
11	MF	Marcelo Brozović	16 November 1992 (aged 25)	35	6	(Italian Football Federation) Inter Milan
12	GK	Lovre Kalinić	3 April 1990 (aged 28)	11	0	(Royal Belgian Football Association) Gent
13	DF	Tin Jedvaj	28 November 1995 (aged 22)	12	0	(German Football Association) Bayer Leverkusen
14	MF	Filip Bradarić	11 January 1992 (aged 26)	4	0	(Croatian Football Federation) Rijeka
15	DF	Duje Ćaleta-Car	17 September 1996 (aged 21)	1	0	(Austrian Football Association) Red Bull Salzburg
16	FW	Nikola Kalinić	5 January 1988 (aged 30)	42	15	(Italian Football Federation) Milan
17	FW	Mario Mandžukić	21 May 1986 (aged 32)	83	30	(Italian Football Federation) Juventus
18	FW	Ante Rebić	21 September 1993 (aged 24)	16	1	(German Football Association) Eintracht Frankfurt
19	MF	Milan Badelj	25 February 1989 (aged 29)	38	1	(Italian Football Federation) Fiorentina
20	FW	Marko Pjaca	6 May 1995 (aged 23)	16	1	(German Football Association) Schalke 04
21	DF	Domagoj Vida	29 April 1989 (aged 29)	59	2	(Turkish Football Federation) Beşiktaş
22	DF	Josip Pivarić	30 January 1989 (aged 29)	19	0	(Ukrainian Association of Football) Dynamo Kyiv
23	GK	Danijel Subašić	27 October 1984 (aged 33)	38	0	(French Football Federation) Monaco

== Matches ==
=== Group stage ===
16 June 2018
21:00 KALT (UTC+2)

Croatia	2–0	Nigeria
Etebo 32' (o.g.); Modrić 71' (pen.)

Kaliningrad Stadium, Kaliningrad
Attendance: 31,136
Referee: Sandro Ricci (Brazil)
21 June 2018
21:00 MSK (UTC+3)

Argentina	0–3	Croatia
		Rebić 53'; Modrić 80'; Rakitić 90+1'

Nizhny Novgorod Stadium, Nizhny Novgorod
Attendance: 43,319
Referee: Ravshan Irmatov (Uzbekistan)
26 June 2018
21:00 MSK (UTC+3)

Iceland	1–2	Croatia
Sigurðsson 76' (pen.)		Badelj 53'; Perišić 90'

Rostov Arena, Rostov-on-Don
Attendance: 43,472
Referee: Antonio Mateu Lahoz (Spain)

=== Round of 16 ===
1 July 2018
21:00 MSK (UTC+3)

Croatia	1–1 (a.e.t.)	Denmark
Mandžukić 4'		M. Jørgensen 1'
Penalties
Badelj (penalty missed); Kramarić (penalty scored); Modrić (penalty scored); Pivarić (penalty missed); Rakitić (penalty scored)	3–2	(penalty missed) Eriksen; (penalty scored) Kjær; (penalty scored) Krohn-Dehli; (penalty missed) Schöne; (penalty missed) N. Jørgensen

Nizhny Novgorod Stadium, Nizhny Novgorod
Attendance: 40,851
Referee: Néstor Pitana (Argentina)

=== Quarter-finals ===
7 July 2018
21:00 MSK (UTC+3)

Russia	2–2 (a.e.t.)	Croatia
Cheryshev 31'; Fernandes 115'		Kramarić 39'; Vida 101'
Penalties
Smolov (penalty missed); Dzagoev (penalty scored); Fernandes (penalty missed); Ignashevich (penalty scored); Kuzyayev (penalty scored)	3–4	(penalty scored) Brozović; (penalty missed) Kovačić; (penalty scored) Modrić; (penalty scored) Vida; (penalty scored) Rakitić

Fisht Olympic Stadium, Sochi
Attendance: 44,287
Referee: Sandro Ricci (Brazil)

=== Semi-finals ===
11 July 2018
21:00 MSK (UTC+3)

Croatia	2–1 (a.e.t.)	England
Perišić 68'; Mandžukić 109'		Trippier 5'

Luzhniki Stadium, Moscow
Attendance: 78,011
Referee: Cüneyt Çakır (Turkey)

=== Final ===
15 July 2018
18:00 MSK (UTC+3)

France	4–2	Croatia
Mandžukić 18' (o.g.); Griezmann 38' (pen.); Pogba 59'; Mbappé 65'		Perišić 28'; Mandžukić 69'

Luzhniki Stadium, Moscow
Attendance: 78,011
Referee: Néstor Pitana (Argentina)

== Standings ==
Legend
Group winners and runners-up advanced to the round of 16

Pos	Team	Pld	W	D	L	GF	GA	GD	Pts	Qualification
1	Croatia	3	3	0	0	7	1	+6	9	Advance to knockout stage
2	Argentina	3	1	1	1	3	5	−2	4	Advance to knockout stage
3	Nigeria	3	1	0	2	3	4	−1	3	
4	Iceland	3	0	1	2	2	5	−3	1	

Source: FIFA
Rules for classification: Group stage tiebreakers
