= 2016–17 in Turkish football =

Football in Turkey
- Season: 2016–17

Men's football
- Süper Lig: Beşiktaş
- First League: Sivasspor
- Turkish Cup: Konyaspor
- Turkish Super Cup: Galatasaray

The 2016–17 season was the 112th season of competitive football in Turkey.

== Pre-season ==
League	Promoted to league	Relegated from league
Süper Lig	Adanaspor; Kardemir Karabükspor; Alanyaspor	Sivasspor; Eskişehirspor; Mersin İdman Yurdu
1.Lig	Ümraniyespor; Manisaspor; Bandırmaspor	1461 Trabzon; Kayseri Erciyesspor; Karşıyaka
2.Lig	Erzurum BB; Zonguldakspor; Etimesgut Belediyespor; Ofspor; Kastamonuspor; Niğde Belediyespor	Bayrampaşaspor; Pazarspor; Orduspor; Kartalspor; Ankara Demirspor; Tarsus İdman Yurdu
3.Lig	12 Bingölspor; Elaziz Belediyespor; Erbaaspor; Türk Metal Kırıkkalespor; Afjet Afyonspor; Halide Edip Adıvarspor; Kütahyaspor; Muğlaspor; Kocaelispor	Arsinspor; Gölbaşıspor; Turgutluspor; Kahramanmaraş Belediyespor; Zara Belediyespor; Ayvalıkgücü Belediyespor; Gaziosmanpaşaspor; Körfez İskenderunspor; Tavşanlı Linyitspor; Çine Madranspor; Sandıklıspor

== League tables ==
=== Süper Lig ===
Pos	Team	Pld	W	D	L	GF	GA	GD	Pts	Qualification or relegation
1	Beşiktaş (C)	34	23	8	3	73	30	+43	77	Qualification for the Champions League group stage
2	Başakşehir	34	21	10	3	63	28	+35	73	Qualification for the Champions League third qualifying round
3	Fenerbahçe	34	18	10	6	60	32	+28	64 (Note: Fenerbahçe ahead of Galatasaray on head-to-head points: Fenerbahçe 6 pts, Galatasaray 0 pts.)	Qualification for the Europa League third qualifying round
4	Galatasaray	34	20	4	10	65	40	+25	64	Qualification for the Europa League second qualifying round
5	Antalyaspor	34	17	7	10	47	40	+7	58	
6	Trabzonspor	34	14	9	11	39	34	+5	51	
7	Akhisar Belediyespor	34	14	6	14	46	42	+4	48	
8	Gençlerbirliği	34	12	10	12	33	34	−1	46	
9	Konyaspor	34	11	10	13	40	45	−5	43 (Note: Konyaspor ahead of Kasımpaşa and Kardemir Karabükspor on head-to-head points: Konyaspor 8 pts, Kasımpaşa 3 pts, Kardemir Karabükspor 3 pts. Kasımpaşa ahead of Kardemir Karabükspor on head-to-head goal difference.)	Qualification for the Europa League group stage (Note: Konyaspor qualified for the Europa League group stage by winning the 2016–17 Turkish Cup.)
10	Kasımpaşa	34	12	7	15	46	50	−4	43	
11	Kardemir Karabükspor	34	12	7	15	38	48	−10	43	
12	Alanyaspor	34	12	4	18	54	65	−11	40	
13	Osmanlıspor	34	9	11	14	37	45	−8	38 (Note: Osmanlıspor were ahead of Bursaspor and Kayserispor on head-to-head points: Osmanlıspor 6 pts, Bursaspor 5 pts, Kayserispor 4 pts.)	
14	Bursaspor	34	11	5	18	34	58	−24	38	
15	Kayserispor	34	10	8	16	47	58	−11	38	
16	Çaykur Rizespor (R)	34	10	6	18	44	53	−9	36	Relegation to TFF First League
17	Gaziantepspor (R)	34	7	5	22	30	65	−35	26	Relegation to TFF First League
18	Adanaspor (R)	34	6	7	21	33	62	−29	25	Relegation to TFF First League

Source: Süper Lig, Soccerway
Rules for classification: 1) Points; 2) Head-to-head points; 3) Head-to-head goal difference; 4) Head-to-head goals scored; 5) Goal difference; 6) Goals scored; 7) Play-off.
(C) Champions; (R) Relegated

=== 1.Lig ===
Pos	Team	Pld	W	D	L	GF	GA	GD	Pts	Qualification or relegation
1	Sivasspor (C, P)	34	17	11	6	51	27	+24	62	Promotion to the Süper Lig
2	Yeni Malatyaspor (P)	34	18	7	9	47	40	+7	61	Promotion to the Süper Lig
3	Eskişehirspor (Note: Eskişehirspor were deducted 3 points.)	34	16	11	7	62	44	+18	56	Qualification for the Süper Lig Playoffs
4	Boluspor	34	16	6	12	56	53	+3	54	Qualification for the Süper Lig Playoffs
5	Göztepe (O, P)	34	15	8	11	55	51	+4	53 (Note: Göztepe is ahead of Giresunspor and Altınordu on head-to-head points: Göztepe 10 pts, Giresunspor 5 pts, Altınordu 1 pt)	Qualification for the Süper Lig Playoffs
6	Giresunspor	34	15	8	11	40	34	+6	53	Qualification for the Süper Lig Playoffs
7	Altınordu	34	14	11	9	45	37	+8	53	
8	Ümraniyespor	34	12	12	10	42	38	+4	48	
9	Balıkesirspor	34	10	12	12	56	48	+8	42	
10	Elazığspor (Note: Elazığspor were deducted 6 points.)	34	12	11	11	43	35	+8	41	
11	Denizlispor (Note: Denizlispor were deducted 3 points.)	34	11	10	13	46	45	+1	40	
12	Manisaspor (Note: Manisaspor were deducted 3 points.)	34	11	9	14	47	53	−6	39	
13	Gaziantep B.B.	34	9	10	15	37	46	−9	37	
14	Adana Demirspor (Note: Adana Demirspor were deducted 3 points.)	34	8	15	11	47	51	−4	36 (Note: Adana Demirspor is ahead of Samsunspor and Şanlıurfaspor on head-to-head points: Adana Demirspor 8 pts, Samsunspor 7 pts, Şanlıurfaspor 1 pt)	
15	Samsunspor	34	9	9	16	27	46	−19	36	
16	Şanlıurfaspor (R)	34	9	9	16	38	46	−8	36	Relegation to the TFF Second League
17	Bandırmaspor (R)	34	9	8	17	43	52	−9	35	Relegation to the TFF Second League
18	Mersin İdmanyurdu (Note: Mersin İdmanyurdu were deducted 3 points.) (R)	34	6	11	17	35	71	−36	26	Relegation to the TFF Second League

Source: TFF First League
Rules for classification: 1) Points; 2) Head-to-head points; 3) Head-to-head goal difference; 4) Head-to-head goals scored; 5) Goal difference; 6) Goals scored
(C) Champions; (O) Play-off winners; (P) Promoted; (R) Relegated

=== 2.Lig ===
==== White Group ====
Pos	Team	Pld	W	D	L	GF	GA	GD	Pts	Qualification or relegation
1	İstanbulspor (P)	34	21	5	8	48	22	+26	68	Promotion to TFF First League
2	Amed	34	19	9	6	51	31	+20	66	Qualification to Promotion Playoffs
3	Erzurum BB (P)	34	17	10	7	56	33	+23	61	Qualification to Promotion Playoffs
4	Kocaeli Birlikspor	34	16	8	10	40	35	+5	56	Qualification to Promotion Playoffs
5	Sivas Belediyespor	34	14	11	9	44	35	+9	53	Qualification to Promotion Playoffs
6	Nazilli Belediyespor	34	13	10	11	41	44	−3	49 (Note: Nazilli Belediyespor ahead of Keçiörengücü on head-to-head points: Nazilli Belediyespor 2-1 Keçiörengücü, Keçiörengücü 0-0 Nazilli Belediyespor)	
7	Keçiörengücü	34	13	10	11	51	48	+3	49	
8	Zonguldak Kömürspor	34	12	11	11	48	42	+6	47	
9	Hacettepe	34	11	11	12	39	35	+4	44 (Note: Hacettepe ahead of Pendikspor on overall goal difference: Hacettepe 3-2 Pendikspor, Pendikspor 1-0 Hacettepe (Both teams are equal in head-to-head points))	
10	Pendikspor	34	12	8	14	43	47	−4	44	
11	Anadolu Selçukspor	34	12	6	16	31	40	−9	42 (Note: Anadolu Selçukspor ahead of Fatih Karagümrük on head-to-head points: Anadolu Selçukspor 3-2 Fatih Karagümrük, Fatih Karagümrük 0-1 Anadolu Selçukspor)	
12	Fatih Karagümrük	34	11	9	14	39	42	−3	42	
13	Bucaspor (Note: Bucaspor was deducted 3 points.)	34	12	7	15	43	55	−12	40 (Note: Bucaspor ahead of Kahramanmaraşspor on head-to-head points: Bucaspor 1-1 Kahramanmaraşspor, Kahramanmaraşspor 1-2 Bucaspor)	
14	Kahramanmaraşspor	34	9	13	12	37	43	−6	40	
15	Fethiyespor	34	9	11	14	35	44	−9	38	
16	Anadolu Üsküdar 1908 (R)	34	8	13	13	34	43	−9	37	Relegation to TFF Third League
17	Tepecikspor (R)	34	9	5	20	42	58	−16	32	Relegation to TFF Third League
18	Ofspor (R)	34	7	5	22	30	55	−25	26	Relegation to TFF Third League

Source: TFF Second League page (in Turkish)
(P) Promoted; (R) Relegated

==== Red Group ====
Pos	Team	Pld	W	D	L	GF	GA	GD	Pts	Qualification or relegation
1	MKE Ankaragücü (P)	34	22	6	6	58	28	+30	72	Promotion to TFF First League
2	Gümüşhanespor	34	20	5	9	53	29	+24	65	Qualification to Promotion Playoffs
3	Kastamonuspor	34	17	9	8	54	33	+21	60	Qualification to Promotion Playoffs
4	Hatayspor	34	16	11	7	39	25	+14	59	Qualification to Promotion Playoffs
5	Menemen Belediyespor	34	15	13	6	65	45	+20	58	Qualification to Promotion Playoffs
6	Karşıyaka	34	16	6	12	58	42	+16	54	
7	Sarıyer	34	14	9	11	50	41	+9	51 (Note: Sarıyer ahead of Etimesgut Belediyespor on head-to-head points: Sarıyer 1-0 Etimesgut Belediyespor, Etimesgut Belediyespor 1-2 Sarıyer)	
8	Etimesgut Belediyespor	34	15	6	13	41	32	+9	51	
9	Niğde Belediyespor	34	12	10	12	32	34	−2	46	
10	Eyüpspor	34	13	5	16	49	64	−15	44	
11	Tokatspor	34	10	12	12	34	37	−3	42	
12	İnegölspor	34	9	14	11	42	43	−1	41	
13	Tuzlaspor	34	10	9	15	36	42	−6	39	
14	Kırklarelispor	34	9	11	14	39	44	−5	38	
15	Bugsaşspor	34	7	16	11	33	37	−4	37 (Note: Bugsaşspor ahead of Aydınspor on overall goal difference: Bugsaşspor 0-1 Aydınspor, Aydınspor 0-1 Bugsaşspor (Both teams are equal in head-to-head points))	
16	Aydınspor (R)	34	9	10	15	38	48	−10	37	Relegation to TFF Third League
17	1461 Trabzon (R)	34	6	15	13	44	50	−6	33	Relegation to TFF Third League
18	Kayseri Erciyesspor (Note: Kayseri Erciyesspor was deducted 9 points.) (R)	34	1	3	30	21	112	−91	−3	Relegation to TFF Third League

Source: TFF Second League page (in Turkish)
(P) Promoted; (R) Relegated

== Turkish Cup ==
- Teams seeded for the group stages: Galatasaray (defending champions), Beşiktaş (1st in the Süper Lig), Fenerbahçe (2nd), and Konyaspor (3rd).
- Teams seeded for the play-off round: İstanbul Başakşehir (4th in the Süper Lig), Osmanlıspor (5th), Galatasaray (6th), Kasımpaşa (7th), Akhisar Belediyespor (8th), Antalyaspor (9th), Gençlerbirliği (10th), Bursaspor (11th), Trabzonspor (12th), Çaykur Rizespor (13th), Gaziantepspor (14th), Adanaspor (1.Lig champions), Kardemir Karabükspor (1.Lig runners-up), and Alanyaspor (promoted from the 1.Lig)
- Teams seeded for the second round: Sivasspor (16th in the Süper Lig), Eskişehirspor (17th), Mersin İdman Yurdu (18th), Adana Demirspor (4th in the 1.Lig), Elazığspor (5th), Balıkesirspor (6th), Giresunspor (7th), Gaziantep B.B. (8th), Samsunspor (9th), Altınordu (10th), Yeni Malatyaspor (11th), Boluspor (12th), Göztepe (13th), Şanlıurfaspor (14th), Denizlispor (15th), 1461 Trabzon (16th in the 1.Lig), Kayseri Erciyesspor (17th), Karşıyaka (18th),

=== Final ===
31 May 2017	İstanbul Başakşehir	0–0 (a.e.t.) (1–4 p)	Konyaspor	Eskişehir
21:30 TRT		Report		Stadium: New Eskişehir Stadium; Referee: Fırat Aydınus
	Penalties
	Belözoğlu (penalty scored); Epureanu (penalty missed); Ünder (penalty missed)		(penalty scored) Hora; (penalty scored) Bajić; (penalty scored) Vuković; (penalty scored) Skubic

== National team ==
=== Friendlies ===
31 August 2016 Friendly	Turkey	0–0	Russia	Antalya, Turkey
21:30 UTC+3				Stadium: Antalya Stadium; Attendance: 31,000; Referee: Damir Skomina (Slovenia)

27 March 2017 Friendly	Turkey	3–1	Moldova	Eskişehir, Turkey
19:15 UTC+3	Mor 14'; Çalık 24'; Ünder 52'		Gînsari 90+1'	Stadium: Eskişehir Stadium; Attendance: 34,930; Referee: Genc Nuza (Kosovo)

5 June 2017 Friendly	Macedonia	0–0	Turkey	Skopje, Macedonia
19:45 UTC+2				Stadium: Philip II Arena; Attendance: 6,000; Referee: Stanislav Todorov (Bulgaria)

=== 2018 FIFA World Cup qualification ===
Pos	Team	Pld	W	D	L	GF	GA	GD	Pts	Qualification	Iceland	Croatia	Ukraine	Turkey	Finland	Kosovo
1	Iceland	10	7	1	2	16	7	+9	22	Qualification to 2018 FIFA World Cup	—	1–0	2–0	2–0	3–2	2–0
2	Croatia	10	6	2	2	15	4	+11	20	Advance to second round	2–0	—	1–0	1–1	1–1	1–0
3	Ukraine	10	5	2	3	13	9	+4	17		1–1	0–2	—	2–0	1–0	3–0
4	Turkey	10	4	3	3	14	13	+1	15		0–3	1–0	2–2	—	2–0	2–0
5	Finland	10	2	3	5	9	13	−4	9		1–0	0–1	1–2	2–2	—	1–1
6	Kosovo	10	0	1	9	3	24	−21	1		1–2	0–6	0–2	1–4	0–1	—

Source: FIFA
Rules for classification: Qualification tiebreakers

5 September 2016 2018 FIFA World Cup Q	Croatia	1–1	Turkey	Zagreb, Croatia
20:45 UTC+2	Rakitić 44' (pen.)	Report (FIFA); Report (UEFA)	Çalhanoğlu 45+3'	Stadium: Stadion Maksimir; Attendance: 0 Referee: Szymon Marciniak (Poland)

6 October 2016 2018 FIFA World Cup Q	Turkey	2–2	Ukraine	Konya, Turkey
21:45 UTC+3	Tufan 45+1'; Çalhanoğlu 81' (pen.)	Report (FIFA); Report (UEFA)	Yarmolenko 24' (pen.); Kravets 27'	Stadium: Konya Büyükşehir Belediye Stadium; Attendance: 36,714; Referee: Manuel Gräfe (Germany)

9 October 2016 2018 FIFA World Cup Q	Iceland	2–0	Turkey	Reykjavík, Iceland
18:45 UTC+0	E. Bjarnason 42'; Finnbogason 44'	Report (FIFA); Report (UEFA)		Stadium: Laugardalsvöllur; Attendance: 9,775; Referee: Mark Clattenburg (England)

12 November 2016 2018 FIFA World Cup Q	Turkey	2–0	Kosovo	Antalya, Turkey
20:00 UTC+3	Yılmaz 51'; Şen 55'	Report (FIFA); Report (UEFA)		Stadium: Antalya Stadium; Attendance: 26,555; Referee: Tamás Bognár (Hungary)

24 March 2017 2018 FIFA World Cup Q	Turkey	2–0	Finland	Antalya, Turkey
20:00 UTC+3	Tosun 9', 13'	Report (FIFA); Report (UEFA)		Stadium: Antalya Stadium; Attendance: 28,990; Referee: Jesús Gil Manzano (Spain)

11 June 2017 2018 FIFA World Cup Q	Kosovo	1–4	Turkey	Shkodër, Albania
20:45 UTC+2	Rrahmani 22'	Report (FIFA); Report (UEFA)	Şen 6'; Ünder 31'; Yılmaz 61'; Tufan 82'	Stadium: Loro Boriçi Stadium; Attendance: 3,758; Referee: Miroslav Zelinka (Czech Republic)

== Turkish clubs in Europe ==
=== UEFA Champions League ===
==== Third qualifying round ====
Team 1	Agg.	Team 2	1st leg	2nd leg
Fenerbahçe (Turkey)	3–4	(France) Monaco	2–1	1–3

==== Group stage ====
===== Group B =====
Pos	Team	Pld	W	D	L	GF	GA	GD	Pts	Qualification	NAP	BEN	BES	DKV
1	(Italy) Napoli	6	3	2	1	11	8	+3	11	Advance to knockout phase	—	4–2	2–3	0–0
2	(Portugal) Benfica	6	2	2	2	10	10	0	8	Advance to knockout phase	1–2	—	1–1	1–0
3	(Turkey) Beşiktaş	6	1	4	1	9	14	−5	7	Transfer to Europa League	1–1	3–3	—	1–1
4	(Ukraine) Dynamo Kyiv	6	1	2	3	8	6	+2	5		1–2	0–2	6–0	—

Source: UEFA
Rules for classification: Group stage tiebreakers

=== UEFA Europa League ===
==== Second qualifying round ====
Team 1	Agg.	Team 2	1st leg	2nd leg
Zimbru Chișinău (Moldova)	2–7	(Turkey) Osmanlıspor	2–2	0–5

==== Third qualifying round ====
Team 1	Agg.	Team 2	1st leg	2nd leg
Osmanlıspor (Turkey)	3–0	(Estonia) Nõmme Kalju	1–0	2–0
İstanbul Başakşehir (Turkey)	2–2 (a)	(Croatia) Rijeka	0–0	2–2

==== Play-off Round ====
Team 1	Agg.	Team 2	1st leg	2nd leg
Midtjylland (Denmark)	0–3	(Turkey) Osmanlıspor	0–1	0–2
Fenerbahçe (Turkey)	5–0	(Switzerland) Grasshopper	3–0	2–0
İstanbul Başakşehir (Turkey)	1–4	(Ukraine) Shakhtar Donetsk	1–2	0–2

==== Group stage ====
===== Group A =====
Pos	Team	Pld	W	D	L	GF	GA	GD	Pts	Qualification	FEN	MU	FEY	ZOR
1	(Turkey) Fenerbahçe	6	4	1	1	8	6	+2	13	Advance to knockout phase	—	2–1	1–0	2–0
2	(England) Manchester United	6	4	0	2	12	4	+8	12	Advance to knockout phase	4–1	—	4–0	1–0
3	(Netherlands) Feyenoord	6	2	1	3	3	7	−4	7		0–1	1–0	—	1–0
4	(Ukraine) Zorya Luhansk	6	0	2	4	2	8	−6	2		1–1	0–2	1–1	—

Source: UEFA
Rules for classification: Group stage tiebreakers

===== Group H =====
Pos	Team	Pld	W	D	L	GF	GA	GD	Pts	Qualification	SHK	GNT	BRA	KON
1	(Ukraine) Shakhtar Donetsk	6	6	0	0	21	5	+16	18	Advance to knockout phase	—	5–0	2–0	4–0
2	(Belgium) Gent	6	2	2	2	9	13	−4	8	Advance to knockout phase	3–5	—	2–2	2–0
3	(Portugal) Braga	6	1	3	2	9	11	−2	6		2–4	1–1	—	3–1
4	(Turkey) Konyaspor	6	0	1	5	2	12	−10	1		0–1	0–1	1–1	—

Source: UEFA
Rules for classification: Group stage tiebreakers

===== Group L =====
Pos	Team	Pld	W	D	L	GF	GA	GD	Pts	Qualification	OSM	VIL	ZUR	STE
1	(Turkey) Osmanlıspor	6	3	1	2	10	7	+3	10	Advance to knockout phase	—	2–2	2–0	2–0
2	(Spain) Villarreal	6	2	3	1	9	8	+1	9	Advance to knockout phase	1–2	—	2–1	2–1
3	(Switzerland) Zürich	6	1	3	2	5	7	−2	6		2–1	1–1	—	0–0
4	(Romania) Steaua București	6	1	3	2	5	7	−2	6		2–1	1–1	1–1	—

Source: UEFA
Rules for classification: Group stage tiebreakers

==== Knockout phase ====
===== Round of 32 =====
Team 1	Agg.	Team 2	1st leg	2nd leg
Olympiacos (Greece)	3–0	(Turkey) Osmanlıspor	0–0	3–0
Krasnodar (Russia)	2–1	(Turkey) Fenerbahçe	1–0	1–1
Hapoel Be'er Sheva (Israel)	2–5	(Turkey) Beşiktaş	1–3	1–2

===== Round of 16 =====
Team 1	Agg.	Team 2	1st leg	2nd leg
Olympiacos (Greece)	2–5	(Turkey) Beşiktaş	1–1	1–4

===== Quarter-finals =====
Team 1	Agg.	Team 2	1st leg	2nd leg
Lyon (France)	3–3 (7–6 p)	(Turkey) Beşiktaş	2–1	1–2 (a.e.t.)
