= 2018 FIFA World Cup qualification – UEFA Group D =

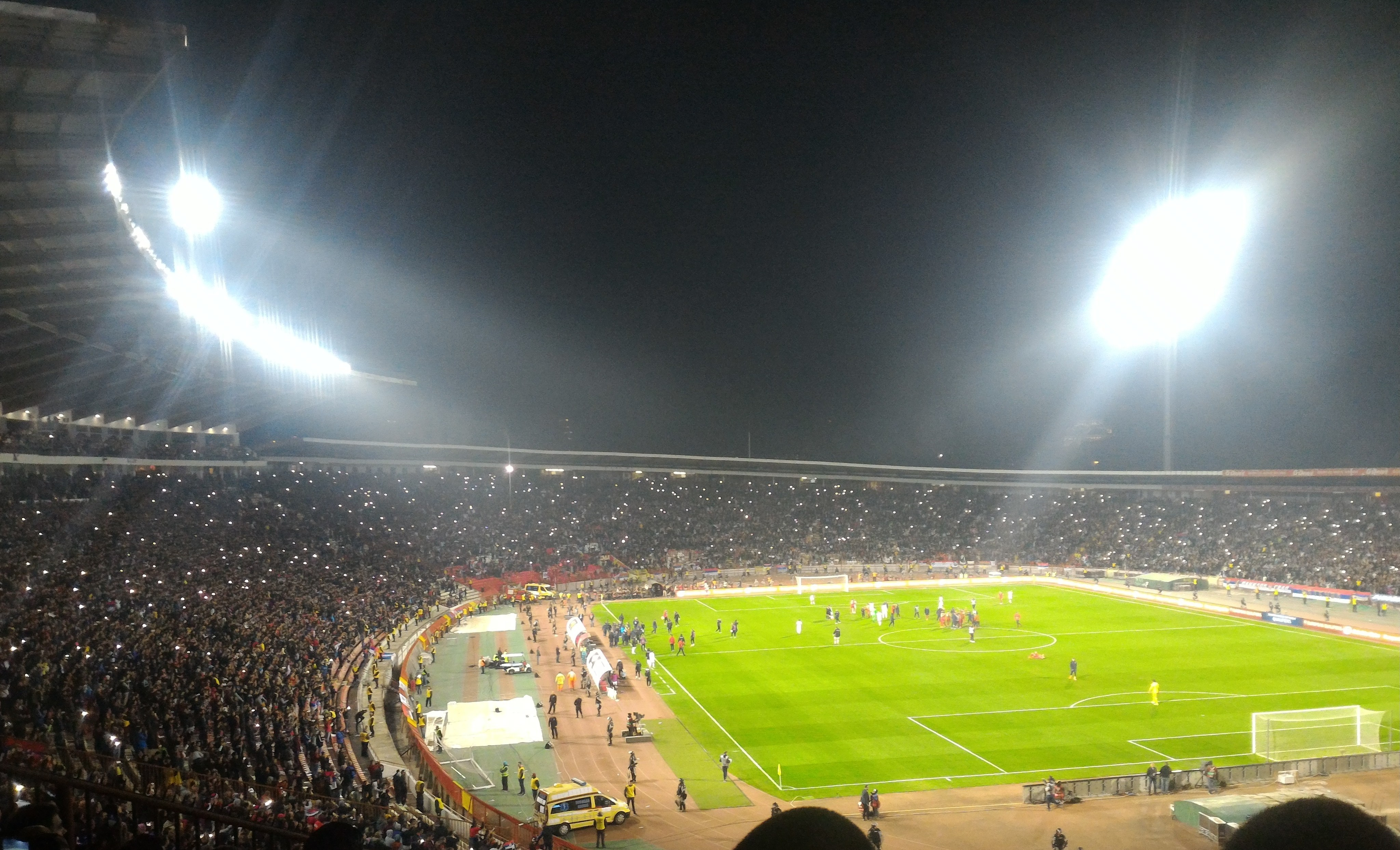
Serbia – Georgia 1–0, World Cup 2018 qualification match at Red Star Stadium

The 2018 FIFA World Cup qualification UEFA Group D was one of the nine UEFA groups for 2018 FIFA World Cup qualification. The group consisted of six teams: Wales, Austria, Serbia, Republic of Ireland, Moldova, and Georgia.

The draw for the first round (group stage) was held as part of the 2018 FIFA World Cup Preliminary Draw on 25 July 2015, starting 18:00 MSK (UTC+3), at the Konstantinovsky Palace in Strelna, Saint Petersburg, Russia.

The group winners, Serbia, qualified directly for the 2018 FIFA World Cup. The group runners-up, Republic of Ireland, advanced to the play-offs as one of the best eight runners-up.

== Standings ==
2018 FIFA World Cup qualification tiebreakers
In league format, the ranking of teams in each group was based on the following criteria (regulations Articles 20.6 and 20.7):
1. Points (3 points for a win, 1 point for a draw, 0 points for a loss)
2. Overall goal difference
3. Overall goals scored
4. Points in matches between tied teams
5. Goal difference in matches between tied teams
6. Goals scored in matches between tied teams
7. Away goals scored in matches between tied teams (if the tie was only between two teams in home-and-away league format)
8. Fair play points
  - first yellow card: minus 1 point
  - indirect red card (second yellow card): minus 3 points
  - direct red card: minus 4 points
  - yellow card and direct red card: minus 5 points
9. Drawing of lots by the FIFA Organising Committee

Pos	Team	Pld	W	D	L	GF	GA	GD	Pts	Qualification	Serbia	Ireland	Wales	Austria	Georgia	Moldova
1	Serbia	10	6	3	1	20	10	+10	21	Qualification to 2018 FIFA World Cup	—	2–2	1–1	3–2	1–0	3–0
2	Republic of Ireland	10	5	4	1	12	6	+6	19	Advance to second round	0–1	—	0–0	1–1	1–0	2–0
3	Wales	10	4	5	1	13	6	+7	17		1–1	0–1	—	1–0	1–1	4–0
4	Austria	10	4	3	3	14	12	+2	15		3–2	0–1	2–2	—	1–1	2–0
5	Georgia	10	0	5	5	8	14	−6	5		1–3	1–1	0–1	1–2	—	1–1
6	Moldova	10	0	2	8	4	23	−19	2		0–3	1–3	0–2	0–1	2–2	—

Source: FIFA
Rules for classification: Qualification tiebreakers

== Matches ==
The fixture list was confirmed by UEFA on 26 July 2015, the day following the draw. Times are CET/CEST, (Note: CET (UTC+1) for matches on 12 November 2016 and 24 March 2017, and CEST (UTC+2) for all other matches.) as listed by UEFA (local times are in parentheses).

5 September 2016
18:00
(20:00 UTC+4)

Georgia	1–2	Austria
Ananidze 78'	Report (FIFA); Report (UEFA)	Hinteregger 16'; Janko 42'

Boris Paichadze Dinamo Arena, Tbilisi
Attendance: 28,500
Referee: Aleksei Kulbakov (Belarus)
5 September 2016
20:45
(20:45 UTC+2)

Serbia	2–2	Republic of Ireland
Kostić 62'; Tadić 69' (pen.)	Report (FIFA); Report (UEFA)	Hendrick 3'; Murphy 80'

Red Star Stadium, Belgrade
Attendance: 7,896
Referee: Viktor Kassai (Hungary)
5 September 2016
20:45
(19:45 UTC+1)

Wales	4–0	Moldova
Vokes 38'; Allen 44'; Bale 51', 90+5' (pen.)	Report (FIFA); Report (UEFA)

Cardiff City Stadium, Cardiff
Attendance: 31,731
Referee: Liran Liany (Israel)

6 October 2016
20:45
(20:45 UTC+2)

Austria	2–2	Wales
Arnautović 28', 48'	Report (FIFA); Report (UEFA)	Allen 22'; Wimmer 45+1' (o.g.)

Ernst-Happel-Stadion, Vienna
Attendance: 44,200
Referee: Cüneyt Çakır (Turkey)
6 October 2016
20:45
(21:45 UTC+3)

Moldova	0–3	Serbia
	Report (FIFA); Report (UEFA)	Kostić 19'; Ivanović 37'; Tadić 59'

Zimbru Stadium, Chișinău
Attendance: 6,192
Referee: Aleksei Kulbakov (Belarus)
6 October 2016
20:45
(19:45 UTC+1)

Republic of Ireland	1–0	Georgia
Coleman 56'	Report (FIFA); Report (UEFA)

Aviva Stadium, Dublin
Attendance: 39,793
Referee: Tony Chapron (France)

9 October 2016
18:00
(17:00 UTC+1)

Wales	1–1	Georgia
Bale 10'	Report (FIFA); Report (UEFA)	Okriashvili 57'

Cardiff City Stadium, Cardiff
Attendance: 32,652
Referee: Paolo Mazzoleni (Italy)
9 October 2016
20:45
(21:45 UTC+3)

Moldova	1–3	Republic of Ireland
Bugaiov 45+1'	Report (FIFA); Report (UEFA)	Long 2'; McClean 69', 76'

Zimbru Stadium, Chișinău
Attendance: 6,089
Referee: Jakob Kehlet (Denmark)
9 October 2016
20:45
(20:45 UTC+2)

Serbia	3–2	Austria
A. Mitrović 6', 23'; Tadić 74'	Report (FIFA); Report (UEFA)	Sabitzer 16'; Janko 62'

Red Star Stadium, Belgrade
Attendance: 14,200
Referee: Jonas Eriksson (Sweden)

12 November 2016
18:00
(18:00 UTC+1)

Austria	0–1	Republic of Ireland
	Report (FIFA); Report (UEFA)	McClean 48'

Ernst-Happel-Stadion, Vienna
Attendance: 48,500
Referee: Sergei Karasev (Russia)
12 November 2016
18:00
(21:00 UTC+4)

Georgia	1–1	Moldova
Qazaishvili 16'	Report (FIFA); Report (UEFA)	Gațcan 78'

Boris Paichadze Dinamo Arena, Tbilisi
Attendance: 40,642
Referee: Georgi Kabakov (Bulgaria)
12 November 2016
20:45
(19:45 UTC±0)

Wales	1–1	Serbia
Bale 30'	Report (FIFA); Report (UEFA)	A. Mitrović 86'

Cardiff City Stadium, Cardiff
Attendance: 32,879
Referee: Alberto Undiano Mallenco (Spain)

24 March 2017
18:00
(21:00 UTC+4)

Georgia	1–3	Serbia
Kacharava 6'	Report (FIFA); Report (UEFA)	Tadić 45' (pen.); A. Mitrović 64'; Gaćinović 86'

Boris Paichadze Dinamo Arena, Tbilisi
Attendance: 31,328
Referee: Felix Zwayer (Germany)
24 March 2017
20:45
(20:45 UTC+1)

Austria	2–0	Moldova
Arnautović 75'; Harnik 90'	Report (FIFA); Report (UEFA)

Ernst-Happel-Stadion, Vienna
Attendance: 21,000
Referee: István Vad (Hungary)
24 March 2017
20:45
(19:45 UTC±0)

Republic of Ireland	0–0	Wales
	Report (FIFA); Report (UEFA)

Aviva Stadium, Dublin
Attendance: 49,989
Referee: Nicola Rizzoli (Italy)

11 June 2017
18:00
(19:00 UTC+3)

Moldova	2–2	Georgia
Gînsari 15'; Dedov 36'	Report (FIFA); Report (UEFA)	Merebashvili 66'; Qazaishvili 70'

Zimbru Stadium, Chișinău
Attendance: 4,803
Referee: Andreas Ekberg (Sweden)
11 June 2017
18:00
(17:00 UTC+1)

Republic of Ireland	1–1	Austria
Walters 85'	Report (FIFA); Report (UEFA)	Hinteregger 31'

Aviva Stadium, Dublin
Attendance: 50,000
Referee: David Fernández Borbalán (Spain)
11 June 2017
20:45
(20:45 UTC+2)

Serbia	1–1	Wales
A. Mitrović 74'	Report (FIFA); Report (UEFA)	Ramsey 35' (pen.)

Red Star Stadium, Belgrade
Attendance: 46,673
Referee: Jorge Sousa (Portugal)

2 September 2017
18:00
(20:00 UTC+4)

Georgia	1–1	Republic of Ireland
Qazaishvili 34'	Report (FIFA); Report (UEFA)	Duffy 4'

Boris Paichadze Dinamo Arena, Tbilisi
Attendance: 19,669
Referee: Ivan Kružliak (Slovakia)
2 September 2017
18:00
(18:00 UTC+2)

Serbia	3–0	Moldova
Gaćinović 20'; Kolarov 30'; A. Mitrović 81'	Report (FIFA); Report (UEFA)

Partizan Stadium, Belgrade
Attendance: 9,974
Referee: Tamás Bognár (Hungary)
2 September 2017
20:45
(19:45 UTC+1)

Wales	1–0	Austria
Woodburn 74'	Report (FIFA); Report (UEFA)

Cardiff City Stadium, Cardiff
Attendance: 32,633
Referee: Ovidiu Hațegan (Romania)

5 September 2017
20:45
(20:45 UTC+2)

Austria	1–1	Georgia
Schaub 43'	Report (FIFA); Report (UEFA)	Gvilia 8'

Ernst-Happel-Stadion, Vienna
Attendance: 13,400
Referee: Orel Grinfeeld (Israel)
5 September 2017
20:45
(21:45 UTC+3)

Moldova	0–2	Wales
	Report (FIFA); Report (UEFA)	Robson-Kanu 80'; Ramsey 90+3'

Zimbru Stadium, Chișinău
Attendance: 10,272
Referee: Paweł Raczkowski (Poland)
5 September 2017
20:45
(19:45 UTC+1)

Republic of Ireland	0–1	Serbia
	Report (FIFA); Report (UEFA)	Kolarov 55'

Aviva Stadium, Dublin
Attendance: 50,153
Referee: Cüneyt Çakır (Turkey)

6 October 2017
18:00
(20:00 UTC+4)

Georgia	0–1	Wales
	Report (FIFA); Report (UEFA)	Lawrence 49'

Boris Paichadze Dinamo Arena, Tbilisi
Attendance: 22,290
Referee: Jesús Gil Manzano (Spain)
6 October 2017
20:45
(20:45 UTC+2)

Austria	3–2	Serbia
Burgstaller 25'; Arnautović 76'; Schaub 89'	Report (FIFA); Report (UEFA)	Milivojević 11'; Matić 83'

Ernst-Happel-Stadion, Vienna
Attendance: 42,400
Referee: Pavel Královec (Czech Republic)
6 October 2017
20:45
(19:45 UTC+1)

Republic of Ireland	2–0	Moldova
Murphy 2', 19'	Report (FIFA); Report (UEFA)

Aviva Stadium, Dublin
Attendance: 50,560
Referee: Bas Nijhuis (Netherlands)

9 October 2017
20:45
(21:45 UTC+3)

Moldova	0–1	Austria
	Report (FIFA); Report (UEFA)	Schaub 69'

Zimbru Stadium, Chișinău
Attendance: 5,542
Referee: Bart Vertenten (Belgium)
9 October 2017
20:45
(20:45 UTC+2)

Serbia	1–0	Georgia
Prijović 74'	Report (FIFA); Report (UEFA)

Red Star Stadium, Belgrade
Attendance: 42,000
Referee: Paweł Gil (Poland)
9 October 2017
20:45
(19:45 UTC+1)

Wales	0–1	Republic of Ireland
	Report (FIFA); Report (UEFA)	McClean 57'

Cardiff City Stadium, Cardiff
Attendance: 32,711
Referee: Damir Skomina (Slovenia)

== Goalscorers ==
There were 71 goals scored in 30 matches, for an average of 2.37 goals per match.

6 goals

- (Serbia) Aleksandar Mitrović

4 goals

- (Austria) Marko Arnautović
- (Republic of Ireland) James McClean
- (Serbia) Dušan Tadić
- (Wales) Gareth Bale

3 goals

- (Austria) Louis Schaub
- (Georgia (country)) Valeri Qazaishvili
- (Republic of Ireland) Daryl Murphy

2 goals

- (Austria) Martin Hinteregger
- (Austria) Marc Janko
- (Serbia) Mijat Gaćinović
- (Serbia) Aleksandar Kolarov
- (Serbia) Filip Kostić
- (Wales) Joe Allen
- (Wales) Aaron Ramsey

1 goal

- (Austria) Guido Burgstaller
- (Austria) Martin Harnik
- (Austria) Marcel Sabitzer
- (Georgia (country)) Jano Ananidze
- (Georgia (country)) Valerian Gvilia
- (Georgia (country)) Nika Kacharava
- (Georgia (country)) Giorgi Merebashvili
- (Georgia (country)) Tornike Okriashvili
- (Moldova) Igor Bugaiov
- (Moldova) Alexandru Dedov
- (Moldova) Alexandru Gațcan
- (Moldova) Radu Gînsari
- (Republic of Ireland) Séamus Coleman
- (Republic of Ireland) Shane Duffy
- (Republic of Ireland) Jeff Hendrick
- (Republic of Ireland) Shane Long
- (Republic of Ireland) Jonathan Walters
- (Serbia) Branislav Ivanović
- (Serbia) Nemanja Matić
- (Serbia) Luka Milivojević
- (Serbia) Aleksandar Prijović
- (Wales) Tom Lawrence
- (Wales) Hal Robson-Kanu
- (Wales) Sam Vokes
- (Wales) Ben Woodburn

1 own goal

- (Austria) Kevin Wimmer (against Wales)

== Discipline ==
A player was automatically suspended for the next match for the following offences:

- Receiving a red card (red card suspensions could be extended for serious offences)
- Receiving two yellow cards in two different matches (yellow card suspensions were carried forward to the play-offs, but not the finals or any other future international matches)

The following suspensions were served during the qualifying matches:

Player	Team	Offence(s)	Suspended for match(es)
Aleksandar Kolarov	Serbia	(yellow card) (yellow-red card) vs Portugal in UEFA Euro 2016 qualifying (11 October 2015)	vs Republic of Ireland (5 September 2016)
Nemanja Matić	Serbia	(red card) vs Portugal in UEFA Euro 2016 qualifying (11 October 2015)	vs Republic of Ireland (5 September 2016) vs Moldova (6 October 2016) vs Austria (9 October 2016)
Shane Duffy	Republic of Ireland	(red card) vs France in UEFA Euro 2016 (26 June 2016)	vs Serbia (5 September 2016)
Jeff Hendrick	Republic of Ireland	(yellow card) vs Serbia (5 September 2016); (yellow card) vs Georgia (6 October 2016)	vs Moldova (9 October 2016)
Andrei Cojocari	Moldova	(yellow card) vs Serbia (6 October 2016); (yellow card) vs Republic of Ireland (9 October 2016)	vs Georgia (12 November 2016)
Alexandru Dedov	Moldova	(yellow card) vs Wales (5 September 2016); (yellow card) vs Republic of Ireland (9 October 2016)	vs Georgia (12 November 2016)
Aleksandar Kolarov	Serbia	(yellow card) vs Moldova (6 October 2016); (yellow card) vs Austria (9 October 2016)	vs Wales (12 November 2016)
Julian Baumgartlinger	Austria	(yellow card) vs Serbia (9 November 2016); (yellow card) vs Republic of Ireland (12 November 2016)	vs Moldova (24 March 2017)
Murtaz Daushvili	Georgia	(yellow card) vs Wales (9 October 2016); (yellow card) vs Moldova (12 November 2016)	vs Serbia (24 March 2017)
Tornike Okriashvili	Georgia	(yellow card) vs Wales (9 October 2016); (yellow card) vs Moldova (12 November 2016)	vs Serbia (24 March 2017)
Robbie Brady	Republic of Ireland	(yellow card) vs Serbia (5 September 2016); (yellow card) vs Austria (12 November 2016)	vs Wales (24 March 2017)
Aleksandar Katai	Serbia	(yellow card) vs Republic of Ireland (5 September 2016); (yellow card) vs Wales (12 November 2016)	vs Georgia (24 March 2017)
Matija Nastasić	Serbia	(yellow card) vs Republic of Ireland (5 September 2016); (yellow card) vs Wales (12 November 2016)	vs Georgia (24 March 2017)
Marko Arnautović	Austria	(yellow card) vs Wales (6 October 2016); (yellow card) vs Moldova (24 March 2017)	vs Republic of Ireland (11 June 2017)
Stefan Ilsanker	Austria	(yellow card) vs Serbia (9 October 2016); (yellow card) vs Moldova (24 March 2017)	vs Republic of Ireland (11 June 2017)
Alexandru Gațcan	Moldova	(yellow card) vs Republic of Ireland (9 October 2016); (yellow card) vs Austria (24 March 2017)	vs Georgia (11 June 2017)
Gareth Bale	Wales	(yellow card) vs Serbia (12 November 2016); (yellow card) vs Republic of Ireland (24 March 2017)	vs Serbia (11 June 2017)
Neil Taylor	Wales	(red card) vs Republic of Ireland (24 March 2017)	vs Serbia (11 June 2017) vs Austria (2 September 2017)
Jaba Kankava	Georgia	(yellow card) vs Serbia (24 March 2017); (yellow card) vs Moldova (11 June 2017)	vs Republic of Ireland (2 September 2017)
Vitalie Bordian	Moldova	(yellow card) vs Georgia (12 November 2016); (yellow card) vs Georgia (11 June 2017)	vs Serbia (2 September 2017)
Luka Milivojević	Serbia	(yellow card) vs Austria (9 October 2016); (yellow card) vs Wales (11 June 2017)	vs Moldova (2 September 2017)
Vladimir Stojković	Serbia	(yellow card) vs Wales (12 November 2016); (yellow card) vs Wales (11 June 2017)	vs Moldova (2 September 2017)
Joe Allen	Wales	(yellow card) vs Serbia (12 November 2016); (yellow card) vs Serbia (11 June 2017)	vs Austria (2 September 2017)
Robbie Brady	Republic of Ireland	(yellow card) vs Austria (11 June 2017); (yellow card) vs Serbia (5 September 2017)	vs Moldova (6 October 2017)
James McClean	Republic of Ireland	(yellow card) vs Georgia (2 September 2017); (yellow card) vs Serbia (5 September 2017)	vs Moldova (6 October 2017)
Nikola Maksimović	Serbia	(red card) vs Republic of Ireland (5 September 2017)	vs Austria (6 October 2017)
Aleksandar Dragović	Austria	(yellow card) vs Republic of Ireland (12 November 2016); (yellow card) vs Serbia (6 October 2017)	vs Moldova (9 October 2017)
Alexandru Gațcan	Moldova	(red card) vs Republic of Ireland (6 October 2017)	vs Austria (9 October 2017)
