= 2018 FIFA World Cup qualification – UEFA Group G =

The 2018 FIFA World Cup qualification UEFA Group G was one of the nine UEFA groups for 2018 FIFA World Cup qualification. The group consisted of six teams: Spain, Italy, Albania, Israel, Macedonia, and Liechtenstein.

The draw for the first round (group stage) was held as part of the 2018 FIFA World Cup Preliminary Draw on 25 July 2015, starting 18:00 MSK (UTC+3), at the Konstantinovsky Palace in Strelna, Saint Petersburg, Russia.

The group winners, Spain, qualified directly for the 2018 FIFA World Cup. The group runners-up, Italy, advanced to the play-offs as one of the best eight runners-up.

== Standings ==
2018 FIFA World Cup qualification tiebreakers
In league format, the ranking of teams in each group was based on the following criteria (regulations Articles 20.6 and 20.7):
1. Points (3 points for a win, 1 point for a draw, 0 points for a loss)
2. Overall goal difference
3. Overall goals scored
4. Points in matches between tied teams
5. Goal difference in matches between tied teams
6. Goals scored in matches between tied teams
7. Away goals scored in matches between tied teams (if the tie was only between two teams in home-and-away league format)
8. Fair play points
  - first yellow card: minus 1 point
  - indirect red card (second yellow card): minus 3 points
  - direct red card: minus 4 points
  - yellow card and direct red card: minus 5 points
9. Drawing of lots by the FIFA Organising Committee

Pos	Team	Pld	W	D	L	GF	GA	GD	Pts	Qualification	Spain	Italy	Albania	Israel	North Macedonia	Liechtenstein
1	Spain	10	9	1	0	36	3	+33	28	Qualification to 2018 FIFA World Cup	—	3–0	3–0	4–1	4–0	8–0
2	Italy	10	7	2	1	21	8	+13	23	Advance to second round	1–1	—	2–0	1–0	1–1	5–0
3	Albania	10	4	1	5	10	13	−3	13		0–2	0–1	—	0–3	2–1	2–0
4	Israel	10	4	0	6	10	15	−5	12		0–1	1–3	0–3	—	0–1	2–1
5	Macedonia	10	3	2	5	15	15	0	11		1–2	2–3	1–1	1–2	—	4–0
6	Liechtenstein	10	0	0	10	1	39	−38	0		0–8	0–4	0–2	0–1	0–3	—

Source: FIFA
Rules for classification: Qualification tiebreakers

== Matches ==
The fixture list was confirmed by UEFA on 26 July 2015, the day following the draw. Times are CET/CEST, (Note: CET (UTC+1) for matches on 12 November 2016 and 24 March 2017, and CEST (UTC+2) for all other matches.) as listed by UEFA (local times are in parentheses).

5 September 2016
20:45
(20:45 UTC+2)

Albania	2–1 (Note: The Albania v Macedonia match was suspended after 76 minutes due to adverse weather conditions, with the score 1–1 at the time. The match was resumed on 6 September 2016, 14:00 UTC+2.)	Macedonia
Sadiku 9'; Balaj 89'	Report (FIFA); Report (UEFA); Report (MacedonianFootball)	Alioski 51'

Loro Boriçi Stadium, Shkodër
Attendance: 14,667
Referee: Hüseyin Göçek (Turkey)
5 September 2016
20:45
(21:45 UTC+3)

Israel	1–3	Italy
Ben Haim II 35'	Report (FIFA); Report (UEFA)	Pellè 14'; Candreva 31' (pen.); Immobile 83'

Sammy Ofer Stadium, Haifa
Attendance: 29,300
Referee: Sergei Karasev (Russia)
5 September 2016
20:45
(20:45 UTC+2)

Spain	8–0	Liechtenstein
Costa 10', 66'; Roberto 55'; Silva 59', 90+1'; Vitolo 60'; Morata 82', 83'	Report (FIFA); Report (UEFA)

Reino de León, León
Attendance: 12,139
Referee: Simon Lee Evans (Wales)

6 October 2016
20:45
(20:45 UTC+2)

Italy	1–1	Spain
De Rossi 82' (pen.)	Report (FIFA); Report (UEFA)	Vitolo 55'

Juventus Stadium, Turin
Attendance: 38,470
Referee: Felix Brych (Germany)
6 October 2016
20:45
(20:45 UTC+2)

Liechtenstein	0–2	Albania
	Report (FIFA); Report (UEFA)	Jehle 12' (o.g.); Balaj 71'

Rheinpark Stadion, Vaduz
Attendance: 5,864
Referee: Tamás Bognar (Hungary)
6 October 2016
20:45
(20:45 UTC+2)

Macedonia	1–2	Israel
Nestorovski 63'	Report (FIFA); Report (UEFA); Report (MacedonianFootball)	Hemed 25'; Ben Haim II 43'

Philip II Arena, Skopje
Attendance: 6,500
Referee: Andre Marriner (England)

9 October 2016
18:00
(19:00 UTC+3)

Israel	2–1	Liechtenstein
Hemed 4', 16'	Report (FIFA); Report (UEFA)	Göppel 49'

Teddy Stadium, Jerusalem
Attendance: 9,000
Referee: Clayton Pisani (Malta)
9 October 2016
20:45
(20:45 UTC+2)

Albania	0–2	Spain
	Report (FIFA); Report (UEFA)	Costa 55'; Nolito 63'

Loro Boriçi Stadium, Shkodër
Attendance: 15,245
Referee: Bas Nijhuis (Netherlands)
9 October 2016
20:45
(20:45 UTC+2)

Macedonia	2–3	Italy
Nestorovski 57'; Hasani 59'	Report (FIFA); Report (UEFA)	Belotti 24'; Immobile 75', 90+2'

Philip II Arena, Skopje
Attendance: 19,195
Referee: Danny Makkelie (Netherlands)

12 November 2016
20:45
(20:45 UTC+1)

Albania	0–3	Israel
	Report (FIFA); Report (UEFA)	Zahavi 18' (pen.); Einbinder 66'; Atar 83'

Elbasan Arena, Elbasan (Note: The venue of the Albania v Israel match was moved from Loro Boriçi Stadium, Shkodër to Elbasan Arena, Elbasan due to a planned terrorist attack.)
Attendance: 7,600
Referee: Deniz Aytekin (Germany)
12 November 2016
20:45
(20:45 UTC+1)

Liechtenstein	0–4	Italy
	Report (FIFA); Report (UEFA)	Belotti 11', 44'; Immobile 12'; Candreva 32'

Rheinpark Stadion, Vaduz
Attendance: 5,864
Referee: Ivan Bebek (Croatia)
12 November 2016
20:45
(20:45 UTC+1)

Spain	4–0	Macedonia
Velkovski 34' (o.g.); Vitolo 63'; Monreal 84'; Aduriz 85'	Report (FIFA); Report (UEFA)

Los Cármenes, Granada
Attendance: 16,622
Referee: Robert Schörgenhofer (Austria)

24 March 2017
20:45
(20:45 UTC+1)

Italy	2–0	Albania
De Rossi 12' (pen.); Immobile 71'	Report (FIFA); Report (UEFA)

Stadio Renzo Barbera, Palermo
Attendance: 33,136
Referee: Slavko Vinčić (Slovenia)
24 March 2017
20:45
(20:45 UTC+1)

Liechtenstein	0–3	Macedonia
	Report (FIFA); Report (UEFA)	Nikolov 43'; Nestorovski 68', 73'

Rheinpark Stadion, Vaduz
Attendance: 4,517
Referee: Jonathan Lardot (Belgium)
24 March 2017
20:45
(20:45 UTC+1)

Spain	4–1	Israel
Silva 13'; Vitolo 45+1'; Costa 51'; Isco 88'	Report (FIFA); Report (UEFA)	Refaelov 76'

El Molinón, Gijón
Attendance: 20,321
Referee: Michael Oliver (England)

11 June 2017
20:45
(21:45 UTC+3)

Israel	0–3	Albania
	Report (FIFA); Report (UEFA)	Sadiku 22', 44'; Memushaj 71'

Sammy Ofer Stadium, Haifa
Attendance: 15,150
Referee: Aleksei Kulbakov (Belarus)
11 June 2017
20:45
(20:45 UTC+2)

Italy	5–0	Liechtenstein
Insigne 35'; Belotti 52'; Éder 75'; Bernardeschi 83'; Gabbiadini 90+1'	Report (FIFA); Report (UEFA)

Stadio Friuli, Udine
Attendance: 20,514
Referee: Kevin Clancy (Scotland)
11 June 2017
20:45
(20:45 UTC+2)

Macedonia	1–2	Spain
Ristovski 66'	Report (FIFA); Report (UEFA)	Silva 15'; Costa 27'

Philip II Arena, Skopje
Attendance: 20,675
Referee: Paweł Gil (Poland)

2 September 2017
18:00
(18:00 UTC+2)

Albania	2–0	Liechtenstein
Roshi 54'; Agolli 78'	Report (FIFA); Report (UEFA)

Elbasan Arena, Elbasan
Attendance: 5,500
Referee: Sergey Lapochkin (Russia)
2 September 2017
20:45
(21:45 UTC+3)

Israel	0–1	Macedonia
	Report (FIFA); Report (UEFA)	Pandev 73'

Sammy Ofer Stadium, Haifa
Attendance: 11,350
Referee: Aleksei Eskov (Russia)
2 September 2017
20:45
(20:45 UTC+2)

Spain	3–0	Italy
Isco 14', 40'; Morata 77'	Report (FIFA); Report (UEFA)

Santiago Bernabéu, Madrid
Attendance: 73,628
Referee: Björn Kuipers (Netherlands)

5 September 2017
20:45
(20:45 UTC+2)

Italy	1–0	Israel
Immobile 53'	Report (FIFA); Report (UEFA)

Mapei Stadium – Città del Tricolore, Reggio Emilia
Attendance: 15,507
Referee: Benoît Bastien (France)
5 September 2017
20:45
(20:45 UTC+2)

Liechtenstein	0–8	Spain
	Report (FIFA); Report (UEFA)	Ramos 3'; Morata 15', 54'; Isco 16'; Silva 39'; Aspas 51', 63'; Göppel 89' (o.g.)

Rheinpark Stadion, Vaduz
Attendance: 5,864
Referee: Ivaylo Stoyanov (Bulgaria)
5 September 2017
20:45
(20:45 UTC+2)

Macedonia	1–1	Albania
Trajkovski 78' (pen.)	Report (FIFA); Report (UEFA)	Roshi 53'

Stadion Mladost, Strumica
Attendance: 3,493
Referee: Jonas Eriksson (Sweden)

6 October 2017
20:45
(20:45 UTC+2)

Italy	1–1	Macedonia
Chiellini 40'	Report (FIFA); Report (UEFA)	Trajkovski 77'

Stadio Olimpico Grande Torino, Turin
Attendance: 22,603
Referee: Tiago Martins (Portugal)
6 October 2017
20:45
(20:45 UTC+2)

Liechtenstein	0–1	Israel
	Report (FIFA); Report (UEFA)	Tibi 22'

Rheinpark Stadion, Vaduz
Attendance: 3,498
Referee: Arnold Hunter (Northern Ireland)
6 October 2017
20:45
(20:45 UTC+2)

Spain	3–0	Albania
Rodrigo 16'; Isco 24'; Thiago 27'	Report (FIFA); Report (UEFA)

José Rico Pérez, Alicante
Attendance: 25,397
Referee: Aleksei Eskov (Russia)

9 October 2017
20:45
(20:45 UTC+2)

Albania	0–1	Italy
	Report (FIFA); Report (UEFA)	Candreva 73'

Loro Boriçi Stadium, Shkodër
Attendance: 14,718
Referee: Svein Oddvar Moen (Norway)
9 October 2017
20:45
(21:45 UTC+3)

Israel	0–1	Spain
	Report (FIFA); Report (UEFA)	Illarramendi 76'

Teddy Stadium, Jerusalem
Attendance: 28,700
Referee: Craig Thomson (Scotland)
9 October 2017
20:45
(20:45 UTC+2)

Macedonia	4–0	Liechtenstein
Musliu 36'; Trajkovski 38'; Bardhi 67'; Ademi 69'	Report (FIFA); Report (UEFA)

Stadion Mladost, Strumica
Attendance: 4,518
Referee: Laurent Kopriwa (Luxembourg)

== Goalscorers ==
There were 93 goals scored in 30 matches, for an average of 3.1 goals per match.

6 goals

- (Italy) Ciro Immobile

5 goals

- (Spain) Diego Costa
- (Spain) Isco
- (Spain) Álvaro Morata
- (Spain) David Silva

4 goals

- (Italy) Andrea Belotti
- (North Macedonia) Ilija Nestorovski
- (Spain) Vitolo

3 goals

- (Albania) Armando Sadiku
- (Israel) Tomer Hemed
- (Italy) Antonio Candreva
- (North Macedonia) Aleksandar Trajkovski

2 goals

- (Albania) Bekim Balaj
- (Albania) Odise Roshi
- (Israel) Tal Ben Haim II
- (Italy) Daniele De Rossi
- (Spain) Iago Aspas

1 goal

- (Albania) Ansi Agolli
- (Albania) Ledian Memushaj
- (Israel) Eliran Atar
- (Israel) Dan Einbinder
- (Israel) Lior Refaelov
- (Israel) Eytan Tibi
- (Israel) Eran Zahavi
- (Italy) Federico Bernardeschi
- (Italy) Giorgio Chiellini
- (Italy) Éder
- (Italy) Manolo Gabbiadini
- (Italy) Lorenzo Insigne
- (Italy) Graziano Pellè
- (Liechtenstein) Maximilian Göppel
- (North Macedonia) Arijan Ademi
- (North Macedonia) Ezgjan Alioski
- (North Macedonia) Enis Bardhi
- (North Macedonia) Ferhan Hasani
- (North Macedonia) Visar Musliu
- (North Macedonia) Boban Nikolov
- (North Macedonia) Goran Pandev
- (North Macedonia) Stefan Ristovski
- (Spain) Aritz Aduriz
- (Spain) Asier Illarramendi
- (Spain) Nacho Monreal
- (Spain) Nolito
- (Spain) Sergio Ramos
- (Spain) Sergi Roberto
- (Spain) Rodrigo
- (Spain) Thiago

1 own goal

- (Liechtenstein) Maximilian Göppel (against Spain)
- (Liechtenstein) Peter Jehle (against Albania)
- (North Macedonia) Darko Velkovski (against Spain)

== Discipline ==
A player was automatically suspended for the next match for the following offences:

- Receiving a red card (red card suspensions could be extended for serious offences)
- Receiving two yellow cards in two different matches (yellow card suspensions were carried forward to the play-offs, but not the finals or any other future international matches)

The following suspensions were served during the qualifying matches:

Player	Team	Offence(s)	Suspended for match(es)
Giorgio Chiellini	Italy	(yellow card) (yellow-red card) vs Israel (5 September 2016)	vs Spain (6 October 2016)
Eytan Tibi	Israel	(red card) vs Macedonia (6 October 2016)	vs Liechtenstein (9 October 2016)
Marco Parolo	Italy	(yellow card) vs Spain (6 October 2016); (yellow card) vs Macedonia (9 October 2016)	vs Liechtenstein (12 November 2016)
Nicolas Hasler	Liechtenstein	(yellow card) vs Spain (5 September 2016); (yellow card) vs Israel (9 October 2016)	vs Italy (12 November 2016)
Etrit Berisha	Albania	(red card) vs Israel (12 November 2016)	vs Italy (24 March 2017) vs Israel (11 June 2017)
Berat Djimsiti	Albania	(red card) vs Israel (12 November 2016)	vs Italy (24 March 2017)
David Goresh	Israel	(yellow card) vs Macedonia (6 October 2016); (yellow card) vs Albania (12 November 2016)	vs Spain (24 March 2017)
Daniel Kaufmann	Liechtenstein	(yellow card) vs Spain (5 September 2016); (yellow card) vs Italy (12 November 2016)	vs Macedonia (24 March 2017)
Yves Oehri	Liechtenstein	(yellow card) vs Albania (6 October 2016); (yellow card) vs Italy (12 November 2016)	vs Macedonia (24 March 2017)
Ezgjan Alioski	Macedonia	(yellow card) vs Italy (9 October 2016); (yellow card) vs Spain (12 November 2016)	vs Liechtenstein (24 March 2017)
Ansi Agolli	Albania	(yellow card) vs Spain (9 October 2016); (yellow card) vs Italy (24 March 2017)	vs Israel (11 June 2017)
Michele Polverino	Liechtenstein	(yellow card) vs Spain (5 September 2016); (yellow card) vs Italy (11 June 2017)	vs Albania (2 September 2017)
Leonardo Bonucci	Italy	(yellow card) vs Spain (6 October 2016); (yellow card) vs Spain (2 September 2017)	vs Israel (5 September 2017)
Eljif Elmas	Macedonia	(yellow card) vs Spain (11 June 2017); (yellow card) vs Israel (2 September 2017)	vs Albania (5 September 2017)
Burim Kukeli	Albania	(yellow card) vs Italy (24 March 2017); (yellow card) vs Macedonia (5 September 2017)	vs Spain (6 October 2017)
Mërgim Mavraj	Albania	(yellow card) vs Spain (9 October 2016); (yellow card) vs Macedonia (5 September 2017)	vs Spain (6 October 2017)
Odise Roshi	Albania	(yellow card) vs Italy (24 March 2017); (yellow card) vs Macedonia (5 September 2017)	vs Spain (6 October 2017)
Almog Cohen	Israel	(yellow card) vs Macedonia (6 October 2016); (yellow card) vs Italy (5 September 2017)	vs Liechtenstein (6 October 2017)
Kire Ristevski	Macedonia	(yellow card) vs Spain (11 June 2017); (yellow card) vs Albania (5 September 2017)	vs Italy (6 October 2017)
Sergio Busquets	Spain	(yellow card) vs Italy (6 October 2016); (yellow card) vs Liechtenstein (5 September 2017)	vs Albania (6 October 2017)
Azdren Llullaku	Albania	(yellow card) vs Israel (12 November 2016); (yellow card) vs Spain (6 October 2017)	vs Italy (9 October 2017)
Taulant Xhaka	Albania	(yellow card) vs Israel (12 November 2016); (yellow card) vs Spain (6 October 2017)	vs Italy (9 October 2017)
Marcel Büchel	Liechtenstein	(yellow card) vs Israel (9 October 2016); (yellow card) vs Israel (6 October 2017)	vs Macedonia (9 October 2017)
Franz Burgmeier	Liechtenstein	(yellow card) vs Albania (6 October 2016); (yellow card) vs Israel (6 October 2017)	vs Macedonia (9 October 2017)
Nicolas Hasler	Liechtenstein	(yellow card) vs Macedonia (24 March 2017); (yellow card) vs Israel (6 October 2017)	vs Macedonia (9 October 2017)
Stefan Spirovski	Macedonia	(yellow card) vs Italy (9 October 2016); (yellow card) vs Italy (6 October 2017)	vs Liechtenstein (9 October 2017)
Gerard Piqué	Spain	(yellow card) vs Italy (6 October 2016); (yellow card) vs Albania (6 October 2017)	vs Israel (9 October 2017)
David Silva	Spain	(yellow card) vs Macedonia (11 June 2017); (yellow card) vs Albania (6 October 2017)	vs Israel (9 October 2017)
