= 2018 FIFA World Cup qualification (UEFA) =

Tournament details
- Dates: 4 September 2016 – 14 November 2017
- Teams: 54 (from 1 confederation)

Tournament statistics
- Matches played: 278
- Goals scored: 807 (2.9 per match)
- Attendance: 5,866,771 (21,103 per match)
- Top scorer(s): (Poland) Robert Lewandowski (16 goals)

The European section of the 2018 FIFA World Cup qualification acted as qualifiers for the 2018 FIFA World Cup, held in Russia, for national teams that were members of the Union of European Football Associations (UEFA). Apart from Russia, who qualified automatically as hosts, a total of 13 slots in the final tournament were available for UEFA teams.

The qualifying format was confirmed by the UEFA Executive Committee meeting on 22–23 March 2015 in Vienna.

The qualification process started on 4 September 2016, almost two months after UEFA Euro 2016, and ended on 14 November 2017. Belgium, England, France, Germany, Iceland (for the first time), Poland, Portugal, Serbia, and Spain qualified in the first round by winning their groups. Croatia, Denmark, Sweden and Switzerland qualified by winning their play-offs.

Four-time champions Italy did not qualify for the 2018 FIFA World Cup, missing out on qualification for the first time since 1958 after losing in the play-offs to Sweden, while the three-time FIFA World Cup runners-up Netherlands did not qualify for the tournament for the first time since 2002 after finishing third in 2014, and second in 2010. Iceland, with 335,000 inhabitants, became the smallest country ever to qualify for a FIFA World Cup.

== Entrants ==
Apart from Russia, which qualified automatically as hosts, all remaining 52 FIFA-affiliated national teams from UEFA at the registration deadline of January 2015 entered qualification.

Gibraltar, despite being a UEFA member since 2013, was not a FIFA member at the time of the registration deadline, and thus was not eligible to enter qualification for the FIFA World Cup. They appealed to the Court of Arbitration for Sport to challenge FIFA's refusal to grant membership in order to enter World Cup qualifying. In May 2016, the CAS found in Gibraltar's favour and ordered that FIFA put Gibraltar forward for FIFA membership, which would permit Gibraltar to take part in the qualifiers if membership was granted.

Kosovo became a UEFA member on 3 May 2016, and together with Gibraltar, applied for membership in the FIFA Congress in 12–13 May 2016. FIFA confirmed that in the case both associations succeeded in becoming a member, they would be entitled to participate in the 2018 FIFA World Cup qualifiers, with UEFA tasked to integrate them into the competition.

On 13 May 2016, both Kosovo and Gibraltar were officially admitted as FIFA members, thus allowing them to compete. UEFA created a task force to discuss how to integrate the two teams into the competition, and on 9 June 2016 UEFA announced that Kosovo would be assigned to Group I, to avoid meeting Bosnia and Herzegovina for security reasons, and Gibraltar would play in Group H.

== Format ==
The qualification structure was as follows:

- First round (group stage): 54 teams were divided into nine groups of six teams each to play home-and-away round-robin matches. The winners of each group qualified for the 2018 FIFA World Cup, and the eight best runners-up advanced to the second round (play-offs).
- Second round (play-offs): Eight best runners-up from the first round played against one other team over two legs, home and away. The draw for these matches was held on 17 October 2017. The first legs were played on 9–11 November, and the second legs were played on 12–14 November 2017 — the winners of each tie qualified for the World Cup.

Qualifying matches started in September 2016, following UEFA Euro 2016, and finished in November 2017.

Round	Matchday	Date
First round (group stage)	Matchday 1	4–6 September 2016
First round (group stage)	Matchday 2	6–8 October 2016
First round (group stage)	Matchday 3	9–11 October 2016
First round (group stage)	Matchday 4	11–13 November 2016
First round (group stage)	Matchday 5	24–26 March 2017
First round (group stage)	Matchday 6	9–11 June 2017
First round (group stage)	Matchday 7	31 August – 2 September 2017
First round (group stage)	Matchday 8	3–5 September 2017
First round (group stage)	Matchday 9	5–7 October 2017
First round (group stage)	Matchday 10	8–10 October 2017

Round	Matchday	Date
Second round (play-offs)	First leg	9–11 November 2017
Second round (play-offs)	Second leg	12–14 November 2017

The scheduling of qualifying matches, which UEFA centralised, followed the "Week of Football" concept first used for UEFA Euro 2016 qualifying:

- Matches take place from Thursday to Tuesday.
- Kick-off times are largely set at 18:00 and 20:45 CET/CEST on Saturdays and Sundays, and 20:45 CET/CEST on Thursdays, Fridays, Mondays, and Tuesdays.
- On double-header matchweeks, teams play on Thursday and Sunday, Friday and Monday, or Saturday and Tuesday.
- Matches in the same group are played on the same day.

The fixture list was confirmed by UEFA on 26 July 2015, the day following the draw.

== First round ==
=== Seeding ===
The draw for the first round (group stage) occurred as part of the 2018 FIFA World Cup Preliminary Draw on 25 July 2015, starting 18:00 MSK (UTC+3), at the Konstantinovsky Palace in Strelna, Saint Petersburg, Russia.

The seeding was based on the July 2015 FIFA World Rankings. The 52 teams were seeded into six pots:

- Pot 1 contains the teams ranked 1–9.
- Pot 2 contains the teams ranked 10–18.
- Pot 3 contains the teams ranked 19–27.
- Pot 4 contains the teams ranked 28–36.
- Pot 5 contains the teams ranked 37–45.
- Pot 6 contains the teams ranked 46–52.

Each six-team group contained one team from each of the six pots, while each five-team group contained one team from each of the first five pots.

Due to the centralization of media rights for European qualifiers, the following teams were drawn into groups with six teams: England, France, Germany, Italy, Spain, and the Netherlands. Both the Netherlands and France were drawn together in Group A, and both Spain and Italy were drawn together in Group G.

In consideration of the political relations between Armenia and Azerbaijan, UEFA requested that FIFA maintain the current UEFA policy not to draw these teams into the same qualification groups (since the two teams were in the same seeding pot, this would not have happened regardless of the request).

Pot 1
Team	Rank
Germany	2
Belgium	3
Netherlands	5
Portugal	7
Romania	8
England	9
Wales	10
Spain	12
Croatia	14

Pot 4
Team	Rank
Turkey	48
Slovenia	49
Israel	51
Republic of Ireland	52
Norway	67
Bulgaria	68
Faroe Islands	74
Montenegro	81
Estonia	82

Pot 2
Team	Rank
Slovakia	15
Austria	15
Italy	17
Switzerland	18
Czech Republic	20
France	22
Iceland	23
Denmark	24
Bosnia and Herzegovina	26

Pot 5
Team	Rank
Cyprus	85
Latvia	87
Armenia	89
Finland	90
Belarus	100
Macedonia	105
Azerbaijan	108
Lithuania	110
Moldova	124

Pot 3
Team	Rank
Ukraine	27
Scotland	29
Poland	30
Hungary	31
Sweden	33
Albania	36
Northern Ireland	37
Serbia	43
Greece	44

Pot 6
Team	Rank
Kazakhstan	142
Luxembourg	146
Liechtenstein	147
Georgia	153
Malta	158
San Marino	192
Andorra	202

The football associations of Gibraltar and Kosovo became members of FIFA after the draw had taken place but before any games had been played. It was decided that both would be added to the World Cup qualifying process in Groups H and I, making those groups up to six teams each; due to the disputed political status of Kosovo, for security reasons, it was decided that Kosovo could not play against Bosnia and Herzegovina or Serbia, which meant Kosovo was added to Group I and Gibraltar to Group H. Gibraltar and Spain had previously been kept separate from each other in UEFA Euro 2016 qualifying as a result of the disputed status of Gibraltar.

The hosts Russia were originally to be partnered with five-team Group H for friendlies. However, with the admission of Kosovo and Gibraltar, all groups were filled to contain six teams and the Russia friendlies against Group H teams were cancelled. UEFA vice-president Hryhoriy Surkis said that the UEFA management would deal with the issue of finding opponents for Russia to play friendlies.

=== Summary ===
Winner of each group qualified directly for the 2018 FIFA World Cup
The eight best runners-up among all nine groups advanced to the second round (play-offs)
Other teams were eliminated after the first round

Group A	Group B	Group C	Group D	Group E	Group F	Group G	Group H	Group I
France	Portugal	Germany	Serbia	Poland	England	Spain	Belgium	Iceland
Sweden	Switzerland	Northern Ireland	Republic of Ireland	Denmark	Slovakia	Italy	Greece	Croatia
Netherlands Bulgaria Luxembourg Belarus	Hungary Faroe Islands Latvia Andorra	Czech Republic Norway Azerbaijan San Marino	Wales Austria Georgia Moldova	Montenegro Romania Armenia Kazakhstan	Scotland Slovenia Lithuania Malta	Albania Israel Macedonia Liechtenstein	Bosnia and Herzegovina Estonia Cyprus Gibraltar	Ukraine Turkey Finland Kosovo

=== Groups ===
2018 FIFA World Cup qualification tiebreakers
In league format, the ranking of teams in each group was based on the following criteria (regulations Articles 20.6 and 20.7):
1. Points (3 points for a win, 1 point for a draw, 0 points for a loss)
2. Overall goal difference
3. Overall goals scored
4. Points in matches between tied teams
5. Goal difference in matches between tied teams
6. Goals scored in matches between tied teams
7. Away goals scored in matches between tied teams (if the tie was only between two teams in home-and-away league format)
8. Fair play points
  - first yellow card: minus 1 point
  - indirect red card (second yellow card): minus 3 points
  - direct red card: minus 4 points
  - yellow card and direct red card: minus 5 points
9. Drawing of lots by the FIFA Organising Committee

==== Group A ====
Pos	Team	Pld	W	D	L	GF	GA	GD	Pts	Qualification	France	Sweden	Netherlands	Bulgaria	Luxembourg	Belarus
1	France	10	7	2	1	18	6	+12	23	Qualification to 2018 FIFA World Cup	—	2–1	4–0	4–1	0–0	2–1
2	Sweden	10	6	1	3	26	9	+17	19	Advance to second round	2–1	—	1–1	3–0	8–0	4–0
3	Netherlands	10	6	1	3	21	12	+9	19		0–1	2–0	—	3–1	5–0	4–1
4	Bulgaria	10	4	1	5	14	19	−5	13		0–1	3–2	2–0	—	4–3	1–0
5	Luxembourg	10	1	3	6	8	26	−18	6		1–3	0–1	1–3	1–1	—	1–0
6	Belarus	10	1	2	7	6	21	−15	5		0–0	0–4	1–3	2–1	1–1	—

Source: FIFA

==== Group B ====
Pos	Team	Pld	W	D	L	GF	GA	GD	Pts	Qualification	Portugal	Switzerland	Hungary	Faroe Islands	Latvia	Andorra
1	Portugal	10	9	0	1	32	4	+28	27	Qualification to 2018 FIFA World Cup	—	2–0	3–0	5–1	4–1	6–0
2	Switzerland	10	9	0	1	23	7	+16	27	Advance to second round	2–0	—	5–2	2–0	1–0	3–0
3	Hungary	10	4	1	5	14	14	0	13		0–1	2–3	—	1–0	3–1	4–0
4	Faroe Islands	10	2	3	5	4	16	−12	9		0–6	0–2	0–0	—	0–0	1–0
5	Latvia	10	2	1	7	7	18	−11	7		0–3	0–3	0–2	0–2	—	4–0
6	Andorra	10	1	1	8	2	23	−21	4		0–2	1–2	1–0	0–0	0–1	—

Source: FIFA

==== Group C ====
Pos	Team	Pld	W	D	L	GF	GA	GD	Pts	Qualification	Germany		Czech Republic	Norway	Azerbaijan	San Marino
1	Germany	10	10	0	0	43	4	+39	30	Qualification to 2018 FIFA World Cup	—	2–0	3–0	6–0	5–1	7–0
2	Northern Ireland	10	6	1	3	17	6	+11	19	Advance to second round	1–3	—	2–0	2–0	4–0	4–0
3	Czech Republic	10	4	3	3	17	10	+7	15		1–2	0–0	—	2–1	0–0	5–0
4	Norway	10	4	1	5	17	16	+1	13		0–3	1–0	1–1	—	2–0	4–1
5	Azerbaijan	10	3	1	6	10	19	−9	10		1–4	0–1	1–2	1–0	—	5–1
6	San Marino	10	0	0	10	2	51	−49	0		0–8	0–3	0–6	0–8	0–1	—

Source: FIFA

==== Group D ====
Pos	Team	Pld	W	D	L	GF	GA	GD	Pts	Qualification	Serbia	Ireland	Wales	Austria	Georgia	Moldova
1	Serbia	10	6	3	1	20	10	+10	21	Qualification to 2018 FIFA World Cup	—	2–2	1–1	3–2	1–0	3–0
2	Republic of Ireland	10	5	4	1	12	6	+6	19	Advance to second round	0–1	—	0–0	1–1	1–0	2–0
3	Wales	10	4	5	1	13	6	+7	17		1–1	0–1	—	1–0	1–1	4–0
4	Austria	10	4	3	3	14	12	+2	15		3–2	0–1	2–2	—	1–1	2–0
5	Georgia	10	0	5	5	8	14	−6	5		1–3	1–1	0–1	1–2	—	1–1
6	Moldova	10	0	2	8	4	23	−19	2		0–3	1–3	0–2	0–1	2–2	—

Source: FIFA

==== Group E ====
Pos	Team	Pld	W	D	L	GF	GA	GD	Pts	Qualification	Poland	Denmark	Montenegro	Romania	Armenia	Kazakhstan
1	Poland	10	8	1	1	28	14	+14	25	Qualification to 2018 FIFA World Cup	—	3–2	4–2	3–1	2–1	3–0
2	Denmark	10	6	2	2	20	8	+12	20	Advance to second round	4–0	—	0–1	1–1	1–0	4–1
3	Montenegro	10	5	1	4	20	12	+8	16		1–2	0–1	—	1–0	4–1	5–0
4	Romania	10	3	4	3	12	10	+2	13		0–3	0–0	1–1	—	1–0	3–1
5	Armenia	10	2	1	7	10	26	−16	7		1–6	1–4	3–2	0–5	—	2–0
6	Kazakhstan	10	0	3	7	6	26	−20	3		2–2	1–3	0–3	0–0	1–1	—

Source: FIFA

==== Group F ====
Pos	Team	Pld	W	D	L	GF	GA	GD	Pts	Qualification	England	Slovakia	Scotland	Slovenia	Lithuania	Malta
1	England	10	8	2	0	18	3	+15	26	Qualification to 2018 FIFA World Cup	—	2–1	3–0	1–0	2–0	2–0
2	Slovakia	10	6	0	4	17	7	+10	18		0–1	—	3–0	1–0	4–0	3–0
3	Scotland	10	5	3	2	17	12	+5	18		2–2	1–0	—	1–0	1–1	2–0
4	Slovenia	10	4	3	3	12	7	+5	15		0–0	1–0	2–2	—	4–0	2–0
5	Lithuania	10	1	3	6	7	20	−13	6		0–1	1–2	0–3	2–2	—	2–0
6	Malta	10	0	1	9	3	25	−22	1		0–4	1–3	1–5	0–1	1–1	—

Source: FIFA

==== Group G ====
Pos	Team	Pld	W	D	L	GF	GA	GD	Pts	Qualification	Spain	Italy	Albania	Israel	North Macedonia	Liechtenstein
1	Spain	10	9	1	0	36	3	+33	28	Qualification to 2018 FIFA World Cup	—	3–0	3–0	4–1	4–0	8–0
2	Italy	10	7	2	1	21	8	+13	23	Advance to second round	1–1	—	2–0	1–0	1–1	5–0
3	Albania	10	4	1	5	10	13	−3	13		0–2	0–1	—	0–3	2–1	2–0
4	Israel	10	4	0	6	10	15	−5	12		0–1	1–3	0–3	—	0–1	2–1
5	Macedonia	10	3	2	5	15	15	0	11		1–2	2–3	1–1	1–2	—	4–0
6	Liechtenstein	10	0	0	10	1	39	−38	0		0–8	0–4	0–2	0–1	0–3	—

Source: FIFA

==== Group H ====
Pos	Team	Pld	W	D	L	GF	GA	GD	Pts	Qualification	Belgium	Greece	Bosnia and Herzegovina	Estonia	Cyprus	Gibraltar
1	Belgium	10	9	1	0	43	6	+37	28	Qualification to 2018 FIFA World Cup	—	1–1	4–0	8–1	4–0	9–0
2	Greece	10	5	4	1	17	6	+11	19	Advance to second round	1–2	—	1–1	0–0	2–0	4–0
3	Bosnia and Herzegovina	10	5	2	3	24	13	+11	17		3–4	0–0	—	5–0	2–0	5–0
4	Estonia	10	3	2	5	13	19	−6	11		0–2	0–2	1–2	—	1–0	4–0
5	Cyprus	10	3	1	6	9	18	−9	10		0–3	1–2	3–2	0–0	—	3–1
6	Gibraltar	10	0	0	10	3	47	−44	0		0–6	1–4	0–4	0–6	1–2	—

Source: FIFA

==== Group I ====
Pos	Team	Pld	W	D	L	GF	GA	GD	Pts	Qualification	Iceland	Croatia	Ukraine	Turkey	Finland	Kosovo
1	Iceland	10	7	1	2	16	7	+9	22	Qualification to 2018 FIFA World Cup	—	1–0	2–0	2–0	3–2	2–0
2	Croatia	10	6	2	2	15	4	+11	20	Advance to second round	2–0	—	1–0	1–1	1–1	1–0
3	Ukraine	10	5	2	3	13	9	+4	17		1–1	0–2	—	2–0	1–0	3–0
4	Turkey	10	4	3	3	14	13	+1	15		0–3	1–0	2–2	—	2–0	2–0
5	Finland	10	2	3	5	9	13	−4	9		1–0	0–1	1–2	2–2	—	1–1
6	Kosovo	10	0	1	9	3	24	−21	1		1–2	0–6	0–2	1–4	0–1	—

Source: FIFA

=== Ranking of second-placed teams ===
When the draw was made, groups H and I had one team fewer than the other groups so it was decided that matches against the last-placed team in each of the six-team groups would not be included in the ranking of the second-placed teams. Although the admission of Kosovo and Gibraltar made all teams have equal groups, this rule was not amended. As a result, only eight matches played by each team were counted in the second-placed table.

The eight best runners-up were determined by the following parameters, in this order:

1. Highest number of points
2. Goal difference
3. Highest number of goals scored
4. Fair play points
5. Drawing of lots

Pos	Grp	Team	Pld	W	D	L	GF	GA	GD	Pts	Qualification
1	B	Switzerland	8	7	0	1	18	6	+12	21	Advance to second round (play-offs)
2	G	Italy	8	5	2	1	12	8	+4	17	Advance to second round (play-offs)
3	E	Denmark	8	4	2	2	13	6	+7	14	Advance to second round (play-offs)
4	I	Croatia	8	4	2	2	8	4	+4	14	Advance to second round (play-offs)
5	A	Sweden	8	4	1	3	18	9	+9	13	Advance to second round (play-offs)
6	C	Northern Ireland	8	4	1	3	10	6	+4	13	Advance to second round (play-offs)
7	H	Greece	8	3	4	1	9	5	+4	13	Advance to second round (play-offs)
8	D	Republic of Ireland	8	3	4	1	7	5	+2	13	Advance to second round (play-offs)
9	F	Slovakia	8	4	0	4	11	6	+5	12	

Source: FIFA
Rules for classification: Counting only matches against teams ranked first to fifth in the group, 1) Points; 2) Goal difference; 3) Goals scored; 4) Fair play points; 5) Drawing of lots.

== Second round ==
The eight best group runners-up contested the second round, where they were paired into four two-legged (home-and-away) fixtures.

=== Seeding and draw ===
The draw for the second round (play-offs) was held on 17 October 2017, 14:00 CEST (UTC+2), at the FIFA headquarters in Zürich, Switzerland. The eight teams were seeded by FIFA World Rankings published on 16 October 2017, rather than qualifying record, with the top four teams in Pot 1, and the remaining four teams in Pot 2. It so happened that the top four teams by qualifying record were the same as the top four by FIFA World Ranking. Teams from Pot 1 played teams from Pot 2 on a home and away basis, with the order of legs decided by draw.

Pot 1	Pot 2
Switzerland (11); Italy (15); Croatia (18); Denmark (19)	Northern Ireland (23); Sweden (25); Republic of Ireland (26); Greece (47)

=== Matches ===
The first legs were played on 9–11 November, and the second legs were played on 12–14 November 2017. The winners of each tie qualified for the World Cup.

Team 1	Agg.	Team 2	1st leg	2nd leg
Switzerland	1–0	Northern Ireland	1–0	0–0
Croatia	4–1	Greece	4–1	0–0
Denmark	5–1	Republic of Ireland	0–0	5–1
Sweden	1–0	Italy	1–0	0–0

== Qualified teams ==
The following 14 teams from UEFA qualified for the final tournament.

Team	Qualified as	Qualified on	Previous appearances in FIFA World Cup^{1}
Russia	Hosts	2 December 2010	10 (1958^{2}, 1962^{2}, 1966^{2}, 1970^{2}, 1982^{2}, 1986^{2}, 1990^{2}, 1994, 2002, 2014)
France	Group A winners	10 October 2017	14 (1930, 1934, 1938, 1954, 1958, 1966, 1978, 1982, 1986, **1998**, 2002, 2006, 2010, 2014)
Portugal	Group B winners	10 October 2017	6 (1966, 1986, 2002, 2006, 2010, 2014)
Germany	Group C winners	5 October 2017	18 (1934, 1938, **1954**^{3}, 1958^{3}, 1962^{3}, 1966^{3}, 1970^{3}, **1974**^{3}, 1978^{3}, 1982^{3}, 1986^{3}, **1990**^{3}, 1994, 1998, 2002, 2006, 2010, **2014**)
Serbia	Group D winners	9 October 2017	11 (1930^{4}, 1950^{4}, 1954^{4}, 1958^{4}, 1962^{4}, 1974^{4}, 1982^{4}, 1990^{4}, 1998^{4}, 2006^{4}, 2010)
Poland	Group E winners	8 October 2017	7 (1938, 1974, 1978, 1982, 1986, 2002, 2006)
England	Group F winners	5 October 2017	14 (1950, 1954, 1958, 1962, **1966**, 1970, 1982, 1986, 1990, 1998, 2002, 2006, 2010, 2014)
Spain	Group G winners	6 October 2017	14 (1934, 1950, 1962, 1966, 1978, 1982, 1986, 1990, 1994, 1998, 2002, 2006, **2010**, 2014)
Belgium	Group H winners	3 September 2017	12 (1930, 1934, 1938, 1954, 1970, 1982, 1986, 1990, 1994, 1998, 2002, 2014)
Iceland	Group I winners	9 October 2017	0 (debut)
Switzerland	Second round (play-off) winners	12 November 2017	10 (1934, 1938, 1950, 1954, 1962, 1966, 1994, 2006, 2010, 2014)
Croatia	Second round (play-off) winners	12 November 2017	4 (1998, 2002, 2006, 2014)
Denmark	Second round (play-off) winners	14 November 2017	4 (1986, 1998, 2002, 2010)
Sweden	Second round (play-off) winners	13 November 2017	11 (1934, 1938, 1950, 1958, 1970, 1974, 1978, 1990, 1994, 2002, 2006)

^{1} Bold indicates champions for that year. Italic indicates hosts for that year.
^{2} Competed as Soviet Union.
^{3} Competed as West Germany. A separate team for East Germany also participated in qualifications during this time, having only competed in 1974.
^{4} From 1930 to 1998, Serbia competed as Yugoslavia, while in 2006 as Serbia and Montenegro.

== Top goalscorers ==
There were 807 goals scored in 278 matches, for an average of 2.9 goals per match.

16 goals

- (Poland) Robert Lewandowski

15 goals

- (Portugal) Cristiano Ronaldo

11 goals

- (Belgium) Romelu Lukaku
- (Denmark) Christian Eriksen

9 goals

- (Portugal) André Silva

8 goals

- (Sweden) Marcus Berg

7 goals

- (Montenegro) Stevan Jovetić

6 goals

- (Belgium) Eden Hazard
- (Greece) Kostas Mitroglou
- (Italy) Ciro Immobile
- (Netherlands) Arjen Robben
- (Serbia) Aleksandar Mitrović
- (Ukraine) Andriy Yarmolenko

Below are full goalscorer lists for all groups and the play-off rounds:

- Group A
- Group B
- Group C
- Group D
- Group E
- Group F
- Group G
- Group H
- Group I
- Play-offs

== Branding ==
UEFA unveiled the branding for the qualifiers on 15 April 2013. It shows a national jersey inside a heart, and represents Europe, honour and ambition. The same branding was also used for the European qualifiers for the UEFA Euro 2016.
