= 2018 FIFA World Cup qualification – UEFA second round =

The UEFA second round was contested by the best eight runners-up from the nine first round groups from the UEFA segment of the qualification tournament for the 2018 FIFA World Cup final tournament. The winners — Croatia, Denmark, Sweden, and Switzerland — of each of four home and away ties joined the group winners in the World Cup in Russia. These pairs of matches, also commonly known as the playoffs, were held in November 2017. The losers were Greece, Italy, Northern Ireland and Republic of Ireland.

The draw for the ties was held in Zürich on 17 October 2017, with the October 2017 FIFA World Rankings being used in deciding which of the teams would be seeded.

== Qualified teams ==
The eight best runners-up from the UEFA first round qualified for the play-offs; at the time of the draw, with two groups having one team fewer than the others, matches against the sixth-placed team in each First Round group were discarded in this ranking even after the admission of Gibraltar and Kosovo, and with all groups now containing six teams. As a result, eight matches played by each team counted for the purposes of ranking the runners-up.

=== Ranking of the runner-up teams ===
The eight best runners-up were determined by the following parameters, in this order:

1. Highest number of points
2. Goal difference
3. Highest number of goals scored
4. Fair play points
5. Drawing of lots

Pos	Grp	Team	Pld	W	D	L	GF	GA	GD	Pts	Qualification
1	B	Switzerland	8	7	0	1	18	6	+12	21	Advance to second round (play-offs)
2	G	Italy	8	5	2	1	12	8	+4	17	Advance to second round (play-offs)
3	E	Denmark	8	4	2	2	13	6	+7	14	Advance to second round (play-offs)
4	I	Croatia	8	4	2	2	8	4	+4	14	Advance to second round (play-offs)
5	A	Sweden	8	4	1	3	18	9	+9	13	Advance to second round (play-offs)
6	C	Northern Ireland	8	4	1	3	10	6	+4	13	Advance to second round (play-offs)
7	H	Greece	8	3	4	1	9	5	+4	13	Advance to second round (play-offs)
8	D	Republic of Ireland	8	3	4	1	7	5	+2	13	Advance to second round (play-offs)
9	F	Slovakia	8	4	0	4	11	6	+5	12	

Source: FIFA

== Seeding and draw ==
The second round draw took place on 17 October 2017 at 14:00 CEST (UTC+2), at the FIFA headquarters in Zürich, Switzerland. Teams were seeded based on October 2017 FIFA World Rankings (shown below in brackets), with each tie seeing a seeded team drawn against an unseeded team. Each tie's order of legs was decided as part of the draw.

The draw was conducted by Mexican TV presenter Vanessa Huppenkothen with the assistance of former Spain international Fernando Hierro.

Pot 1	Pot 2
Switzerland (11); Italy (15); Croatia (18); Denmark (19)	Northern Ireland (23); Sweden (25); Republic of Ireland (26); Greece (47)

== Matches ==
The first legs were played on 9–11 November, and the second legs were played on 12–14 November 2017.

Team 1	Agg.	Team 2	1st leg	2nd leg
Switzerland	1–0	Northern Ireland	1–0	0–0
Croatia	4–1	Greece	4–1	0–0
Denmark	5–1	Republic of Ireland	0–0	5–1
Sweden	1–0	Italy	1–0	0–0

9 November 2017
19:45 UTC+0

Northern Ireland	0–1	Switzerland
	Report (FIFA); Report (UEFA)	Rodríguez 58' (pen.)

Windsor Park, Belfast
Attendance: 18,269
Referee: Ovidiu Hațegan (Romania)
12 November 2017
18:00 UTC+1

Switzerland	0–0	Northern Ireland
	Report (FIFA); Report (UEFA)

St. Jakob-Park, Basel
Attendance: 36,000
Referee: Felix Brych (Germany)

Switzerland won 1–0 on aggregate and qualified for the 2018 FIFA World Cup.

9 November 2017
20:45 UTC+1

Croatia	4–1	Greece
Modrić 13' (pen.); N. Kalinić 19'; Perišić 33'; Kramarić 49'	Report (FIFA); Report (UEFA)	Papastathopoulos 30'

Stadion Maksimir, Zagreb
Attendance: 30,013
Referee: Gianluca Rocchi (Italy)
12 November 2017
21:45 UTC+2

Greece	0–0	Croatia
	Report (FIFA); Report (UEFA)

Karaiskakis Stadium, Piraeus
Attendance: 18,667
Referee: Björn Kuipers (Netherlands)

Croatia won 4–1 on aggregate and qualified for the 2018 FIFA World Cup.

11 November 2017
20:45 UTC+1

Denmark	0–0	Republic of Ireland
	Report (FIFA); Report (UEFA)

Parken Stadium, Copenhagen
Attendance: 36,189
Referee: Milorad Mažić (Serbia)
14 November 2017
19:45 UTC+0

Republic of Ireland	1–5	Denmark
Duffy 6'	Report (FIFA); Report (UEFA)	A. Christensen 29'; Eriksen 32', 63', 74'; Bendtner 90' (pen.)

Aviva Stadium, Dublin
Attendance: 50,000
Referee: Szymon Marciniak (Poland)

Denmark won 5–1 on aggregate and qualified for the 2018 FIFA World Cup.

10 November 2017
20:45 UTC+1

Sweden	1–0	Italy
Johansson 61'	Report (FIFA); Report (UEFA)

Friends Arena, Solna
Attendance: 49,193
Referee: Cüneyt Çakır (Turkey)
13 November 2017
20:45 UTC+1

Italy	0–0	Sweden
	Report (FIFA); Report (UEFA)

San Siro, Milan
Attendance: 72,696
Referee: Antonio Mateu Lahoz (Spain)

Sweden won 1–0 on aggregate and qualified for the 2018 FIFA World Cup.

== Goalscorers ==
There were 13 goals scored in 8 matches, for an average of 1.62 goals per match.

3 goals

- (Denmark) Christian Eriksen

1 goal

- (Croatia) Nikola Kalinić
- (Croatia) Andrej Kramarić
- (Croatia) Luka Modrić
- (Croatia) Ivan Perišić
- (Denmark) Nicklas Bendtner
- (Denmark) Andreas Christensen
- (Greece) Sokratis Papastathopoulos
- (Republic of Ireland) Shane Duffy
- (Sweden) Jakob Johansson
- (Switzerland) Ricardo Rodríguez

== Discipline ==
A player was automatically suspended for the next match for the following offences:

- Receiving a red card (red card suspensions could be extended for serious offences)
- Receiving two yellow cards in two different matches (yellow card suspensions were carried forward to the play-offs, but not the finals or any other future international matches)

The following suspensions were served during the qualifying matches:

Player	Team	Offence(s)	Suspended for match(es)
David Meyler	Republic of Ireland	(yellow card) vs Wales (24 March 2017); (yellow card) vs Wales (9 October 2017)	vs Denmark (11 November 2017)
Mikael Lustig	Sweden	(yellow card) vs Netherlands (6 September 2016); (yellow card) vs Netherlands (9 October 2017)	vs Italy (10 November 2017)
Corry Evans	Northern Ireland	(yellow card) vs Azerbaijan (11 November 2016); (yellow card) vs Switzerland (9 November 2017)	vs Switzerland (12 November 2017)
Marco Verratti	Italy	(yellow card) vs Spain (2 September 2017); (yellow card) vs Sweden (10 November 2017)	vs Sweden (13 November 2017)
