= Loro Boriçi Stadium =

Multi-purpose stadium in Shkodër, Albania

- Stadiumi Loro Boriçi (sq)
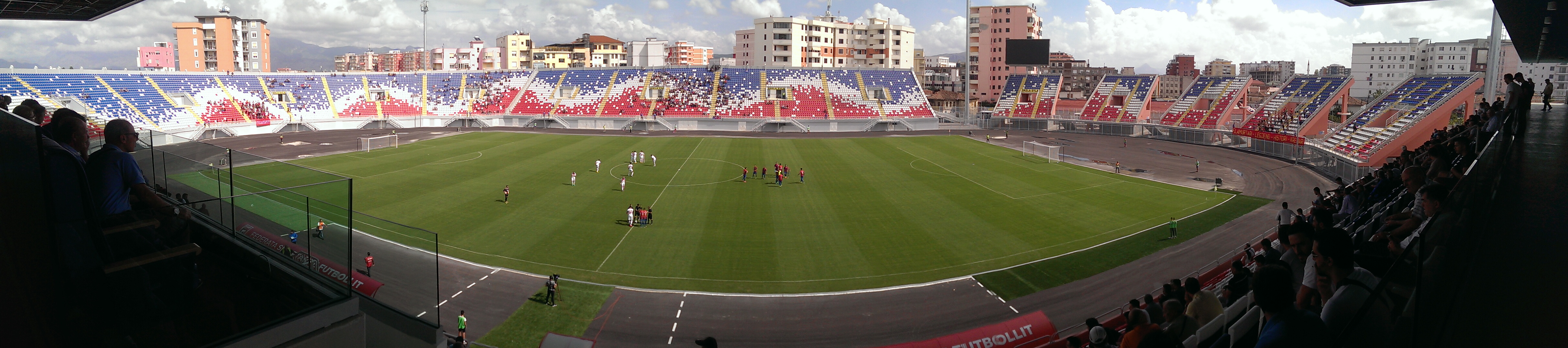
- UEFA
- Interactive map of Loro Boriçi Stadium
- Former names: Vojo Kushi Stadium (1952–1990)
- Address: Rruga Djepaxhijej 2, 4001
- Location: Shkodër, Albania
- Coordinates: 42°04′12″N 19°30′24″E
- Owner: Shkodër Municipality
- Operator: Albanian Football Association and Vllaznia
- Capacity: 16,022
- Surface: Grass
- Scoreboard: LED
- Record attendance: 16,000
- Field size: 105 by 68 metres (114.8 yd × 74.4 yd)

Construction
- Groundbreaking: 27 May 1950
- Built: 1950–1952
- Opened: 1 May 1952; 74 years ago (original stadium); 29 August 2016; 10 years ago (rebuilt stadium)
- Renovated: 1988, 2001, 2016
- Cost: €17 million (2015–16 rebuild cost)
- Architect: Bolles+Wilson

Tenants
- Vllaznia (1952–present); Albania national football team (2003–2019)

The Loro Boriçi Stadium (Albanian: Stadiumi "Loro Boriçi"), previously known as Vojo Kushi Stadium (Albanian: Stadiumi Vojo Kushi), is a multi-purpose stadium in Shkodër, Albania, which is used mostly for football matches and is the home ground of Vllaznia. The stadium has a capacity of around 16,000 seated.

== History ==
On 17 May 1950, the construction of the stadium started and on 1 May 1952, the stadium was inaugurated and was named after Vojo Kushi, who was an Albanian partisan, hero of Albania. In 1990, during the fall of communism in Albania, the stadium was renamed in honour of football coach and former player Loro Boriçi (1922–1984). Between 2015 and 2016 the stadium was rebuilt into a modern all-seater stadium with a capacity of 16,022. The stadium is also the second largest stadium in Albania behind the Qemal Stafa Stadium in Tirana.

=== 2015 Reconstruction ===
The stadium was last renovated in 2001. In October 2014, the Prime Minister of Albania, Edi Rama announced the reconstruction of the stadium. On 3 May 2015, the construction work officially started, bringing the stadium to a renewed capacity of 18,100.

=== International matches ===
==== Albania ====
On 29 March 2003, it hosted a UEFA Euro 2004 qualifying match of Albania against Russia and finished with a 3–1 win.

#	Date	Competition	Opponent	Score	Att.	Ref
1.	29 March 2003	UEFA Euro 2004 qualifying	Russia	3–1	16,000	
2.	7 February 2007	Friendly	Macedonia	0–1	7,000	
3.	24 March 2007	UEFA Euro 2008 qualifying	Slovenia	0–0	12,000	
4.	10 August 2011	Friendly	Montenegro	3–2	5,000	
5.	31 August 2016	Friendly	Morocco	0–0	—N/a	
6.	5 September 2016	2018 FIFA World Cup qualification	Macedonia	2–1	14,667	
7.	9 October 2016	2018 FIFA World Cup qualification	Spain	0–2	15,425	
8.	9 October 2017	2018 FIFA World Cup qualification	Italy	0–1	14,718	
9.	17 November 2018	2018–19 UEFA Nations League	Scotland	0–4	8,632	
10.	22 March 2019	UEFA Euro 2020 qualifying	Turkey	0–2	11,730	

==== Kosovo ====
After stadiums in Mitrovica and Pristina were under renovation and do not meet UEFA standards. Kosovo played the qualifying matches of the 2018 FIFA World Cup in Loro Boriçi Stadium. On 6 October 2016, it hosted the first qualifying match of Kosovo against Croatia and finished with a 0–6 biggest defeat.

#	Date	Competition	Opponent	Score	Att.	Ref
1.	6 October 2016	2018 FIFA World Cup qualification	Croatia	0–6	14,612	
2.	24 March 2017	2018 FIFA World Cup qualification	Iceland	1–2	6,832	
3.	11 June 2017	2018 FIFA World Cup qualification	Turkey	1–4	6,000	
4.	5 September 2017	2018 FIFA World Cup qualification	Finland	0–1	2,446	
5.	6 October 2017	2018 FIFA World Cup qualification	Ukraine	0–2	1,261	

== Notes and references ==
=== Notes ===
1. After stadiums in Mitrovica and Pristina were under renovation and do not meet UEFA standards. Kosovo played the qualifying matches of the 2018 FIFA World Cup in Loro Boriçi Stadium.
