= 2018 FIFA World Cup qualification – UEFA Group I =

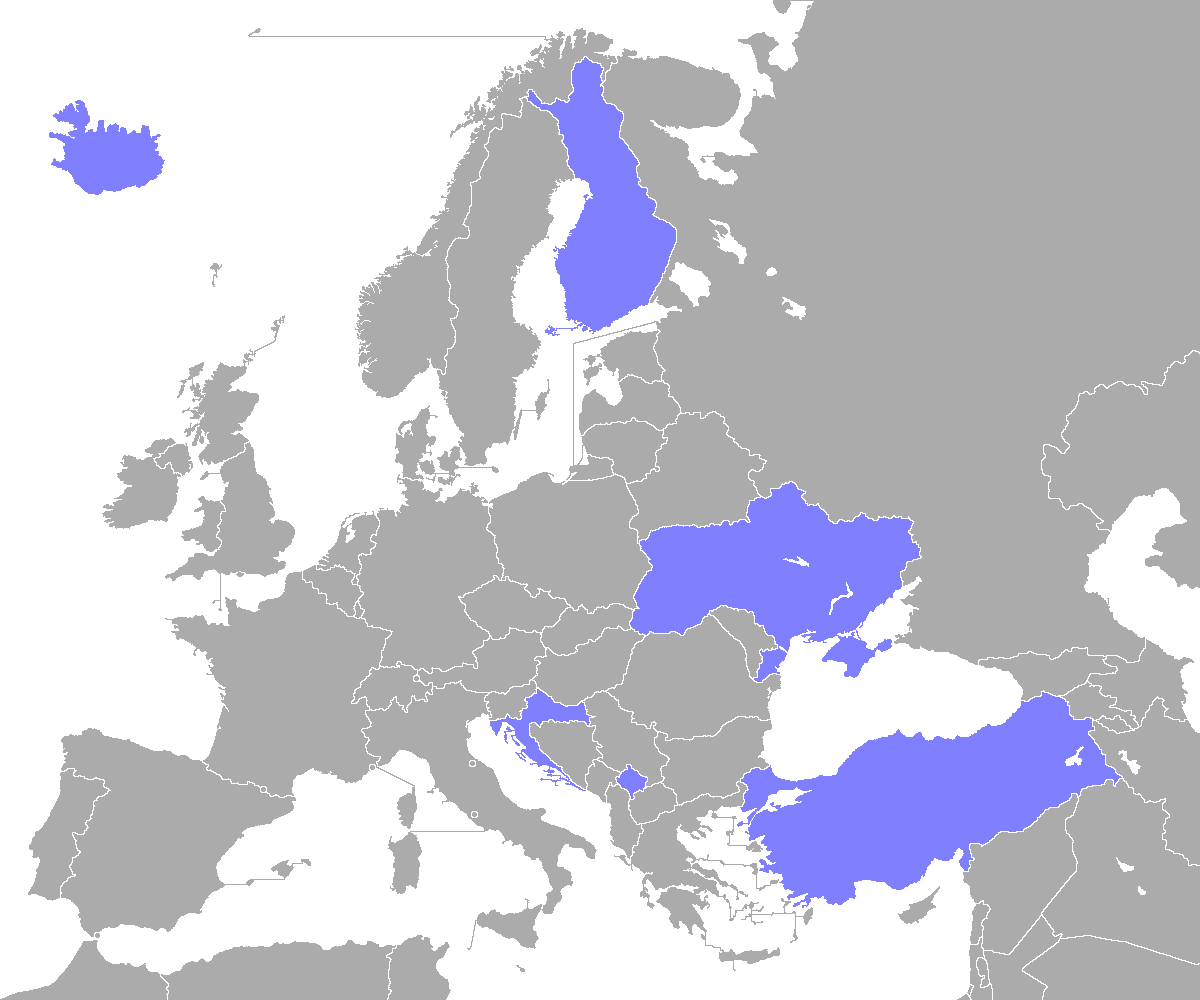
2018 World Cup Qualifiers UEFA, Group I.

The 2018 FIFA World Cup qualification UEFA Group I was one of the nine UEFA groups for 2018 FIFA World Cup qualification. The group consisted of six teams: Croatia, Iceland, Ukraine, Turkey, Finland, and Kosovo.

The draw for the first round (group stage) was held as part of the 2018 FIFA World Cup Preliminary Draw on 25 July 2015, starting 18:00 MSK (UTC+3), at the Konstantinovsky Palace in Strelna, Saint Petersburg, Russia. Kosovo was added to the group after the draw, after becoming FIFA members together with Gibraltar in May 2016, and UEFA decided not to put Kosovo in group H as the UEFA Emergency Panel considered that Bosnia and Herzegovina and Serbia should not play against Kosovo for security reasons.

The group winners, Iceland, qualified directly for the 2018 FIFA World Cup. The group runners-up, Croatia, advanced to the play-offs as one of the best 8 runners-up. This was the first time Ukraine was eliminated after the first round, as the team had been eliminated in 1998, 2002, 2010 and 2014 after the play-offs, and qualified in 2006.

== Standings ==
2018 FIFA World Cup qualification tiebreakers
In league format, the ranking of teams in each group was based on the following criteria (regulations Articles 20.6 and 20.7):
1. Points (3 points for a win, 1 point for a draw, 0 points for a loss)
2. Overall goal difference
3. Overall goals scored
4. Points in matches between tied teams
5. Goal difference in matches between tied teams
6. Goals scored in matches between tied teams
7. Away goals scored in matches between tied teams (if the tie was only between two teams in home-and-away league format)
8. Fair play points
  - first yellow card: minus 1 point
  - indirect red card (second yellow card): minus 3 points
  - direct red card: minus 4 points
  - yellow card and direct red card: minus 5 points
9. Drawing of lots by the FIFA Organising Committee

Pos	Team	Pld	W	D	L	GF	GA	GD	Pts	Qualification	Iceland	Croatia	Ukraine	Turkey	Finland	Kosovo
1	Iceland	10	7	1	2	16	7	+9	22	Qualification to 2018 FIFA World Cup	—	1–0	2–0	2–0	3–2	2–0
2	Croatia	10	6	2	2	15	4	+11	20	Advance to second round	2–0	—	1–0	1–1	1–1	1–0
3	Ukraine	10	5	2	3	13	9	+4	17		1–1	0–2	—	2–0	1–0	3–0
4	Turkey	10	4	3	3	14	13	+1	15		0–3	1–0	2–2	—	2–0	2–0
5	Finland	10	2	3	5	9	13	−4	9		1–0	0–1	1–2	2–2	—	1–1
6	Kosovo	10	0	1	9	3	24	−21	1		1–2	0–6	0–2	1–4	0–1	—

Source: FIFA
Rules for classification: Qualification tiebreakers

== Matches ==
The fixture list prior to the inclusion of Kosovo was confirmed by UEFA on 26 July 2015, the day following the draw. Times are CET/CEST, (Note: CET (UTC+1) for matches on 12 November 2016 and 24 March 2017, and CEST (UTC+2) for all other matches.) as listed by UEFA (local times are in parentheses).

5 September 2016
20:45
(20:45 UTC+2)

Croatia	1–1	Turkey
Rakitić 44' (pen.)	Report (FIFA); Report (UEFA)	Çalhanoğlu 45+3'

Stadion Maksimir, Zagreb
Attendance: 0 (Note: Croatia were sanctioned by FIFA to play two home matches (against Turkey on 5 September 2016 and against Iceland on 12 November 2016) without spectators for two cases of discriminatory chants by fans, which occurred during friendly matches against Israel on 23 March 2016 and against Hungary on 26 March 2016, having already been sanctioned for similar incidents by FIFA and UEFA.)
Referee: Szymon Marciniak (Poland)
5 September 2016
20:45
(21:45 UTC+3)

Finland	1–1	Kosovo
Arajuuri 18'	Report (FIFA); Report (UEFA)	V. Berisha 60' (pen.)

Veritas Stadion, Turku
Attendance: 7,571
Referee: Ivan Kružliak (Slovakia)
5 September 2016
20:45
(21:45 UTC+3)

Ukraine	1–1	Iceland
Yarmolenko 41'	Report (FIFA); Report (UEFA)	Finnbogason 6'

Olympic Stadium, Kyiv
Attendance: 0 (Note: Ukraine were sanctioned by FIFA to play one home match (against Iceland on 5 September 2016) without spectators for racist behaviour in the 2014 FIFA World Cup qualifying match against San Marino at Arena Lviv, Lviv. In addition, the Football Federation of Ukraine were ordered not to play any of its 2018 FIFA World Cup qualifying matches at Arena Lviv.)
Referee: Clément Turpin (France)

6 October 2016
20:45
(18:45 UTC±0)

Iceland	3–2	Finland
Árnason 37'; Finnbogason 90+1'; R. Sigurðsson 90+6'	Report (FIFA); Report (UEFA)	Pukki 21'; Lod 39'

Laugardalsvöllur, Reykjavík
Attendance: 9,548
Referee: Svein Oddvar Moen (Norway)
6 October 2016
20:45
(20:45 UTC+2)

Kosovo	0–6	Croatia
	Report (FIFA); Report (UEFA)	Mandžukić 6', 24', 35'; Mitrović 68'; Perišić 83'; N. Kalinić 90+2'

Loro Boriçi Stadium, Shkodër (Albania) (Note: Kosovo play their home matches at Loro Boriçi Stadium, Shkodër in Albania instead of their regular stadium, City Stadium, Pristina in Kosovo.)
Attendance: 14,612
Referee: David Fernández Borbalán (Spain)
6 October 2016
20:45
(21:45 UTC+3)

Turkey	2–2	Ukraine
Tufan 45+1'; Çalhanoğlu 81' (pen.)	Report (FIFA); Report (UEFA)	Yarmolenko 24' (pen.); Kravets 27'

Torku Arena, Konya
Attendance: 36,714
Referee: Manuel Gräfe (Germany)

9 October 2016
18:00
(19:00 UTC+3)

Finland	0–1	Croatia
	Report (FIFA); Report (UEFA)	Mandžukić 18'

Tampere Stadium, Tampere
Attendance: 15,567
Referee: Ruddy Buquet (France)
9 October 2016
18:00
(18:00 UTC+2)

Ukraine	3–0	Kosovo
Kravets 31'; Yarmolenko 81'; Rotan 87'	Report (FIFA); Report (UEFA)

Józef Piłsudski Stadium, Kraków (Poland) (Note: The Ukraine v Kosovo match was played in a neutral venue due to Ukraine's non-recognition of Kosovo's travel documents.)
Attendance: 999
Referee: Kevin Blom (Netherlands)
9 October 2016
20:45
(18:45 UTC±0)

Iceland	2–0	Turkey
T. Bjarnason 42'; Finnbogason 44'	Report (FIFA); Report (UEFA)

Laugardalsvöllur, Reykjavík
Attendance: 9,775
Referee: Mark Clattenburg (England)

12 November 2016
18:00
(18:00 UTC+1)

Croatia	2–0	Iceland
Brozović 15', 90+1'	Report (FIFA); Report (UEFA)

Stadion Maksimir, Zagreb
Attendance: 0
Referee: Gianluca Rocchi (Italy)
12 November 2016
18:00 (Note: The home matches of Turkey against Kosovo and Finland were changed to 18:00 CET (20:00 local time) due to the decision of the Turkish government to use the UTC+3 time zone all year round starting from September 2016.)
(20:00 UTC+3)

Turkey	2–0	Kosovo
Yılmaz 51'; Şen 55'	Report (FIFA); Report (UEFA)

New Antalya Stadium, Antalya
Attendance: 26,555
Referee: Tamás Bognár (Hungary)
12 November 2016
20:45
(21:45 UTC+2)

Ukraine	1–0	Finland
Kravets 25'	Report (FIFA); Report (UEFA)

Chornomorets Stadium, Odesa
Attendance: 26,482
Referee: Jorge Sousa (Portugal)

24 March 2017
18:00
(20:00 UTC+3)

Turkey	2–0	Finland
Tosun 9', 13'	Report (FIFA); Report (UEFA)

New Antalya Stadium, Antalya
Attendance: 28,990
Referee: Jesús Gil Manzano (Spain)
24 March 2017
20:45
(20:45 UTC+1)

Croatia	1–0	Ukraine
N. Kalinić 38'	Report (FIFA); Report (UEFA)

Stadion Maksimir, Zagreb
Attendance: 27,351
Referee: Antonio Mateu Lahoz (Spain)
24 March 2017
20:45
(20:45 UTC+1)

Kosovo	1–2	Iceland
Nuhiu 52'	Report (FIFA); Report (UEFA)	B. Sigurðarson 25'; G. Sigurðsson 35' (pen.)

Loro Boriçi Stadium, Shkodër (Albania)
Attendance: 6,832
Referee: Artur Soares Dias (Portugal)

11 June 2017
18:00
(19:00 UTC+3)

Finland	1–2	Ukraine
Pohjanpalo 72'	Report (FIFA); Report (UEFA)	Konoplyanka 51'; Besyedin 75'

Tampere Stadium, Tampere
Attendance: 8,723
Referee: Alon Yefet (Israel)
11 June 2017
20:45
(18:45 UTC±0)

Iceland	1–0	Croatia
Magnússon 90'	Report (FIFA); Report (UEFA)

Laugardalsvöllur, Reykjavík
Attendance: 9,775
Referee: Alberto Undiano Mallenco (Spain)
11 June 2017
20:45
(20:45 UTC+2)

Kosovo	1–4	Turkey
Rrahmani 22'	Report (FIFA); Report (UEFA)	Şen 7'; Ünder 31'; Yılmaz 61'; Tufan 82'

Loro Boriçi Stadium, Shkodër (Albania)
Attendance: 3,758
Referee: Miroslav Zelinka (Czech Republic)

2 September 2017
18:00
(19:00 UTC+3)

Finland	1–0	Iceland
Ring 8'	Report (FIFA); Report (UEFA)

Tampere Stadium, Tampere
Attendance: 15,835
Referee: Pavel Královec (Czech Republic)
2 September 2017
20:45
(20:45 UTC+2)

Croatia	1–0 (Note: The Croatia v Kosovo match was suspended after 21 minutes due to torrential rain, with the score 0–0 at the time. The match was resumed on 3 September, 14:30 UTC+2.)	Kosovo
Vida 74'	Report (FIFA); Report (UEFA)

Stadion Maksimir, Zagreb
Attendance: 6,839
Referee: Stefan Johannesson (Sweden)
2 September 2017
20:45
(21:45 UTC+3)

Ukraine	2–0	Turkey
Yarmolenko 18', 42'	Report (FIFA); Report (UEFA)

Metalist Stadium, Kharkiv
Attendance: 36,796
Referee: David Fernández Borbalán (Spain)

5 September 2017
20:45
(18:45 UTC±0)

Iceland	2–0	Ukraine
G. Sigurðsson 47', 66'	Report (FIFA); Report (UEFA)

Laugardalsvöllur, Reykjavík
Attendance: 9,769
Referee: Willie Collum (Scotland)
5 September 2017
20:45
(20:45 UTC+2)

Kosovo	0–1	Finland
	Report (FIFA); Report (UEFA)	Pukki 83'

Loro Boriçi Stadium, Shkodër (Albania)
Attendance: 2,446
Referee: Manuel Schüttengruber (Austria)
5 September 2017
20:45
(21:45 UTC+3)

Turkey	1–0	Croatia
Tosun 75'	Report (FIFA); Report (UEFA)

New Eskişehir Stadium, Eskişehir
Attendance: 28,600
Referee: Viktor Kassai (Hungary)

6 October 2017
20:45
(20:45 UTC+2)

Croatia	1–1	Finland
Mandžukić 57'	Report (FIFA); Report (UEFA)	Soiri 90'

Stadion Rujevica, Rijeka
Attendance: 7,578
Referee: Daniel Stefański (Poland)
6 October 2017
20:45
(20:45 UTC+2)

Kosovo	0–2	Ukraine
	Report (FIFA); Report (UEFA)	Paqarada 60' (o.g.); Yarmolenko 88'

Loro Boriçi Stadium, Shkodër (Albania)
Attendance: 1,261
Referee: Craig Pawson (England)
6 October 2017
20:45
(21:45 UTC+3)

Turkey	0–3	Iceland
	Report (FIFA); Report (UEFA)	Guðmundsson 32'; Bjarnason 39'; Árnason 50'

New Eskişehir Stadium, Eskişehir
Attendance: 30,390
Referee: Szymon Marciniak (Poland)

9 October 2017
20:45
(21:45 UTC+3)

Finland	2–2	Turkey
Arajuuri 76'; Pohjanpalo 88'	Report (FIFA); Report (UEFA)	Tosun 57', 83'

Veritas Stadion, Turku
Attendance: 6,612
Referee: Benoît Bastien (France)
9 October 2017
20:45
(18:45 UTC±0)

Iceland	2–0	Kosovo
G. Sigurðsson 40'; Guðmundsson 68'	Report (FIFA); Report (UEFA)

Laugardalsvöllur, Reykjavík
Attendance: 9,775
Referee: Harald Lechner (Austria)
9 October 2017
20:45
(21:45 UTC+3)

Ukraine	0–2	Croatia
	Report (FIFA); Report (UEFA)	Kramarić 62', 70'

Olympic Stadium, Kyiv
Attendance: 60,200
Referee: Felix Brych (Germany)

== Goalscorers ==
There were 70 goals scored in 30 matches, for an average of 2.33 goals per match.

6 goals

- (Ukraine) Andriy Yarmolenko

5 goals

- (Croatia) Mario Mandžukić
- (Turkey) Cenk Tosun

4 goals

- (Iceland) Gylfi Sigurðsson

3 goals

- (Iceland) Alfreð Finnbogason
- (Ukraine) Artem Kravets

2 goals

- (Croatia) Marcelo Brozović
- (Croatia) Nikola Kalinić
- (Croatia) Andrej Kramarić
- (Finland) Paulus Arajuuri
- (Finland) Joel Pohjanpalo
- (Finland) Teemu Pukki
- (Iceland) Kári Árnason
- (Iceland) Jóhann Berg Guðmundsson
- (Turkey) Hakan Çalhanoğlu
- (Turkey) Volkan Şen
- (Turkey) Ozan Tufan
- (Turkey) Burak Yılmaz

1 goal

- (Croatia) Matej Mitrović
- (Croatia) Ivan Perišić
- (Croatia) Ivan Rakitić
- (Croatia) Domagoj Vida
- (Finland) Robin Lod
- (Finland) Alexander Ring
- (Finland) Pyry Soiri
- (Iceland) Birkir Bjarnason
- (Iceland) Theódór Elmar Bjarnason
- (Iceland) Hörður Björgvin Magnússon
- (Iceland) Björn Bergmann Sigurðarson
- (Iceland) Ragnar Sigurðsson
- (Kosovo) Valon Berisha
- (Kosovo) Atdhe Nuhiu
- (Kosovo) Amir Rrahmani
- (Turkey) Cengiz Ünder
- (Ukraine) Artem Besyedin
- (Ukraine) Yevhen Konoplyanka
- (Ukraine) Ruslan Rotan

1 own goal

- (Kosovo) Leart Paqarada (against Ukraine)

== Discipline ==
A player was automatically suspended for the next match for the following offences:

- Receiving a red card (red card suspensions could be extended for serious offences)
- Receiving two yellow cards in two different matches (yellow card suspensions were carried forward to the play-offs, but not the finals or any other future international matches)

The following suspensions were served during the qualifying matches:

Player	Team	Offence(s)	Suspended for match(es)
Aron Gunnarsson	Iceland	(yellow card) vs Ukraine (5 September 2016); (yellow card) vs Finland (6 October 2016)	vs Turkey (9 October 2016)
Niklas Moisander	Finland	(yellow card) vs Iceland (6 October 2016); (yellow card) vs Croatia (9 October 2016)	vs Ukraine (12 November 2016)
Hekuran Kryeziu	Kosovo	(yellow card) vs Finland (5 September 2016); (yellow card) vs Ukraine (9 October 2016)	vs Turkey (12 November 2016)
Emre Mor	Turkey	(yellow card) vs Ukraine (6 October 2016); (yellow card) vs Iceland (9 October 2016)	vs Kosovo (12 November 2016)
Ivan Perišić	Croatia	(red card) vs Iceland (12 November 2016)	vs Ukraine (24 March 2017)
Thomas Lam	Finland	(yellow card) vs Kosovo (5 September 2016); (yellow card) vs Ukraine (12 November 2016)	vs Turkey (24 March 2017)
Theódór Elmar Bjarnason	Iceland	(yellow card) vs Ukraine (9 October 2016); (yellow card) vs Croatia (12 November 2016)	vs Kosovo (24 March 2017)
Enis Alushi	Kosovo	(yellow card) vs Finland (5 September 2016); (yellow card) vs Turkey (12 November 2016)	vs Iceland (24 March 2017)
Eduard Sobol	Ukraine	(yellow card) vs Turkey (6 October 2016); (yellow card) vs Finland (12 November 2016)	vs Croatia (24 March 2017)
Paulus Arajuuri	Finland	(yellow card) vs Iceland (6 October 2016); (yellow card) vs Turkey (24 March 2017)	vs Ukraine (11 June 2017)
Alexander Ring	Finland	(yellow card) vs Croatia (9 October 2016); (yellow card) vs Turkey (24 March 2017)	vs Ukraine (11 June 2017)
Bernard Berisha	Kosovo	(yellow card) (yellow-red card) vs Turkey (11 June 2017)	vs Croatia (2 September 2017)
Burak Yılmaz	Turkey	(yellow card) vs Kosovo (12 November 2016); (yellow card) vs Kosovo (11 June 2017)	vs Ukraine (2 September 2017)
Yaroslav Rakitskiy	Ukraine	(yellow card) vs Finland (12 November 2016); (yellow card) vs Finland (11 June 2017)	vs Turkey (2 September 2017)
Jere Uronen	Finland	(yellow card) vs Turkey (24 March 2017); (yellow card) vs Iceland (2 September 2017)	vs Kosovo (5 September 2017)
Rúrik Gíslason	Iceland	(yellow card) (yellow-red card) vs Finland (2 September 2017)	vs Ukraine (5 September 2017)
Milan Badelj	Croatia	(yellow card) vs Iceland (12 November 2016); (yellow card) vs Turkey (5 September 2017)	vs Finland (6 October 2017)
Robin Lod	Finland	(yellow card) vs Iceland (2 September 2017); (yellow card) vs Kosovo (5 September 2017)	vs Croatia (6 October 2017)
Emil Hallfreðsson	Iceland	(yellow card) vs Finland (2 September 2017); (yellow card) vs Ukraine (5 September 2017)	vs Turkey (6 October 2017)
Bernard Berisha	Kosovo	(yellow card) vs Turkey (11 June 2017); (yellow card) vs Finland (5 September 2017)	vs Ukraine (6 October 2017)
Valon Berisha	Kosovo	(yellow card) vs Ukraine (9 October 2016); (yellow card) vs Finland (5 September 2017)	vs Ukraine (6 October 2017)
Hakan Çalhanoğlu	Turkey	(yellow card) vs Ukraine (6 October 2016); (yellow card) vs Croatia (5 September 2017)	vs Iceland (6 October 2017)
Viktor Kovalenko	Ukraine	(yellow card) vs Finland (11 June 2017); (yellow card) vs Iceland (5 September 2017)	vs Kosovo (6 October 2017)
Oleksandr Zinchenko	Ukraine	(yellow card) vs Finland (12 November 2016); (yellow card) vs Iceland (5 September 2017)	vs Kosovo (6 October 2017)
Hekuran Kryeziu	Kosovo	(yellow card) vs Iceland (24 March 2017); (yellow card) vs Ukraine (6 October 2017)	vs Iceland (9 October 2017)
Caner Erkin	Turkey	(yellow card) vs Ukraine (6 October 2016); (yellow card) vs Iceland (6 October 2017)	vs Finland (9 October 2017)
Artem Kravets	Ukraine	(yellow card) vs Finland (12 November 2016); (yellow card) vs Kosovo (6 October 2017)	vs Croatia (9 October 2017)
Ivan Ordets	Ukraine	(yellow card) vs Turkey (6 October 2016); (yellow card) vs Kosovo (6 October 2017)	vs Croatia (9 October 2017)
