= New Eskişehir Stadium =

Football stadium in Eskişehir, Turkey

Coordinates: 39°45′44″N 30°28′4″E

Fethi Heper Stadium
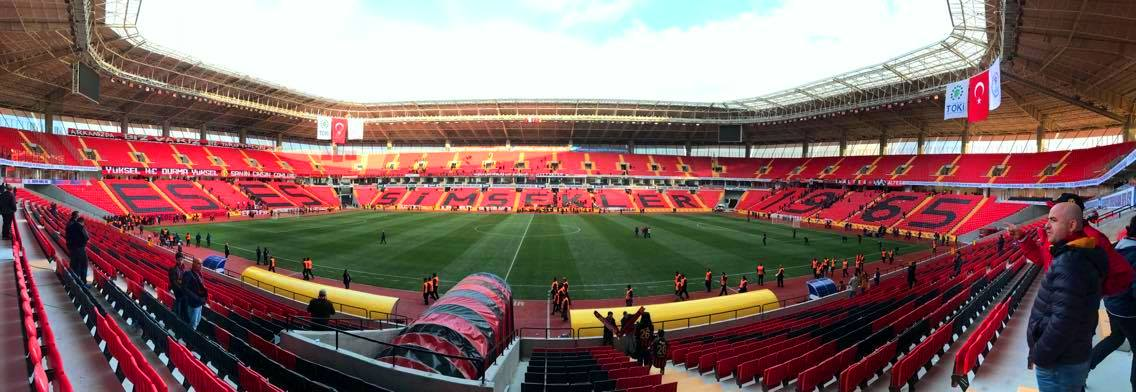
- Interactive map of Fethi Heper Stadium
- Full name: Prof. Dr. Fethi Heper Stadium
- Location: Eskişehir, Turkey
- Operator: Eskişehirspor
- Capacity: 32,500 List: 34,930 (2016–2019) 32,507 (2019–2020) 32,500 (2020–)
- Executive suites: 54
- Record attendance: 34,930 (Turkey-Moldova, 27 March 2017)

Construction
- Groundbreaking: 23 August 2013
- Built: 2013–2016
- Opened: 20 November 2016
- Architects: HSY Yapı & Aras İnşaat

Tenants
- Eskişehirspor; Turkey national football team (selected matches)

The Fethi Heper Stadium (Turkish: Fethi Heper Stadyumu) is a stadium in Eskişehir, Turkey. It opened to the public in late 20 November 2016 and has a capacity of 32,500 spectators. Named after the club's top goal scorer Fethi Heper, it is the home ground of Eskişehirspor. It replaced the club's former home, Eskişehir Atatürk Stadium.

Despite the locals many requests and promises made by the AKP government for the stadium to be renamed to New Eskişehir Atatürk Stadium, the stadium was renamed to Fethi Heper Stadium in 2025.

== Matches ==
=== Turkish National Team ===
Fethi Heper Stadium is one of the main home stadiums of the Turkish national Football team.

Date	Time (CEST)	Team #1	Res.	Team #2	Round	Attendance
27 March 2017	18:15	Turkey	3–1	Moldova	Friendly	34,930
5 September 2017	20:45	Turkey	1–0	Croatia	2018 FIFA World Cup qualifying	28,600
6 October 2017	20:45	Turkey	0–3	Iceland	2018 FIFA World Cup qualifying	30,390
25 March 2019	19:00	Turkey	4–0	Moldova	UEFA Euro 2020 qualifying	29,456
8 September 2023	20:45	Turkey	1–1	Armenia	UEFA Euro 2024 qualifying	31,740

== See also ==
- Lists of stadiums
- List of football stadiums in Turkey
