= 2016–17 Maccabi Tel Aviv F.C. season =

Maccabi Tel Aviv
2016–17 season
- Chairman: Mitchell Goldhar
- Stadium: Netanya Stadium (temporary)
- Premier League: 2nd
- State Cup: Runners-up
- Toto Cup: Quarter-final
- Europa League: Group stage
- Top goalscorer: League: Viðar Örn Kjartansson (19); All: Viðar Örn Kjartansson (24)
Home colours	Away colours	Third colours

The 2016–17 season is Maccabi Tel Aviv's 110th season since its establishment in 1906, and 69th since the establishment of the State of Israel. During the 2016–17 campaign the club have competed in the Israeli Premier League, State Cup, Toto Cup, UEFA Europa League.

== First team ==
No.	Pos.	Nation	Player
1	GK	ISR	Daniel Lifshitz
2	DF	ISR	Eli Dasa
3	DF	ISR	Yuval Spungin
4	DF	BRA	Ramon Roma
5	MF	ARG	Óscar Scarione
6	MF	ISR	Gal Alberman (Captain)
9	FW	ISL	Viðar Kjartansson
10	FW	ISR	Barak Yitzhaki
11	FW	ISR	Tal Ben Haim II
13	MF	ISR	Sheran Yeini
14	MF	POR	Rúben Micael
15	MF	ISR	Dor Micha
17	FW	ISR	Sagiv Yehezkel

No.	Pos.	Nation	Player
18	DF	ISR	Eitan Tibi
19	GK	BRA	Daniel Tenenbaum
20	DF	ISR	Omri Ben Harush
21	DF	BLR	Egor Filipenko
22	MF	ISR	Avi Rikan
23	MF	ISR	Eyal Golasa
25	FW	USA	Aaron Schoenfeld
26	DF	ISR	Tal Ben Haim I
29	MF	BRA	Marcelo Dos Santos
31	GK	ISR	Barak Levi
45	MF	ISR	Eliel Peretz
51	MF	ISR	Yossi Benayoun
95	GK	SRB	Predrag Rajković

== Transfers ==
=== Summer ===
In:

No.	Pos.	Nation	Player
—	MF	ISR	Yossi Benayoun (from (Israel) Maccabi Haifa)
—	DF	BLR	Egor Filipenko (from (Spain) Málaga CF)
—	GK	ISR	Daniel Lifshitz (from (Israel) Hapoel Ra'anana)
—	MF	ISR	Eyal Golasa (from (Greece) PAOK)
5	MF	ARG	Óscar Scarione (from (Turkey) Kasımpaşa S.K.)
-	FW	ISL	Viðar Kjartansson (from (Sweden) Malmö FF)
-	FW	BRA	Daniel Miller Tenenbaum (on loan from (Brazil) Clube de Regatas do Flamengo)
—	FW	ISR	Sagiv Yehezkel (from (Israel) Hapoel Tel Aviv)

Out:

No.	Pos.	Nation	Player
—	MF	ISR	Eran Zahavi (to (China) Guangzhou R&F F.C.)
—	DF	ESP	Carlos Garcia (to (Turkey) Alanyaspor)
—	FW	NGA	Lanry Kahinda (to (United Arab Emirates) Dibba Al-Fujairah Club)
—	GK	ISR	Haviv Ohayon (on loan to (England) Watford)
—	MF	ISR	Shlomi Azulay (on loan to (Israel) Hapoel Ironi Kiryat Shmona)
—	FW	POR	Orlando Sá (to (Belgium) Standard Liège)
—	FW	ISR	Raz Itzhak (on loan to (Israel) Beitar Tel Aviv Ramla)
—	FW	ISR	Matan Hozez (on loan to (Israel) Hapoel Ashkelon)

=== Winter ===
In:

No.	Pos.	Nation	Player
—	MF	BRA	Marcelo (from (Brazil) Esporte Clube Vitória)
—	DF	BRA	Ramon (on loan from (Brazil) Esporte Clube Vitória)
—	DF	ISR	Sheran Yeini (from (Netherlands) SBV Vitesse)
—	MF	POR	Rúben Micael (on loan from (China) Shijiazhuang Ever Bright)
—	FW	ISR	Aaron Schoenfeld (from (Israel) Hapoel Tel Aviv)

Out:

No.	Pos.	Nation	Player
—	FW	ISR	Eden Ben Basat (to (Israel) [Hapoel Haifa)
—	MF	ISR	Dor Peretz (on loan to (Israel) [Hapoel Haifa)
—	MF	BIH	Haris Medunjanin (to (United States) Philadelphia Union)
—	MF	NGA	Nosa Igiebor (to (Turkey) Çaykur Rizespor)

== Pre-season and friendlies ==
19 June 2016 Training Camp	Maccabi Tel Aviv (Israel)	3–0	(Slovakia) Dunajská Streda	Leoben, Austria
19:00	Itzhaki 19' (pen.); Sá 21'; Ben Basat 71'

23 June 2016 Training Camp	Maccabi Tel Aviv (Israel)	1–0	(Hungary) Paksi FC	Leoben, Austria
19:00	Sá 16'

== UEFA Europa League ==
=== First qualifying round ===
30 June 2016 First leg	Maccabi Tel Aviv (Israel)	3–0	(Slovenia) ND Gorica	Netanya, Israel
	Igeibor 13', 69'; Sá 45'		Škarabot (yellow card) 11'	Stadium: Netanya Stadium

7 July 2016 Second leg	ND Gorica (Slovenia)	0–1	(Israel) Maccabi Tel Aviv	Nova Gorica, Slovenia
			Benayoun 10'; Ben Haim DF (yellow card) 73'	Stadium: Sports Park

=== Second qualifying round ===
14 July 2016 First leg	FC Kairat (Kazakhstan)	1–1	(Israel) Maccabi Tel Aviv	Almaty, Kazakhstan
17:45	Alberman (yellow card) 55'; Benayoun 90'		Arshavin 29'; Marković (yellow card) 59'; Islamkhan (yellow card) 90+3' (yellow-red card) 90+3'	Stadium: Almaty Central Stadium

21 July 2016 Second leg	Maccabi Tel Aviv (Israel)	2–1	(Kazakhstan) FC Kairat	Netanya, Israel
20:00	Ben Haim FW 5' (yellow card) 22'; Igiebor (yellow card) 41'; Alberman 86'; Rajković (yellow card) 90+2'; Micha (yellow card) 90+3'		Lunin (yellow card) 24'; Gohou (yellow card) 53' (goal) 64'; Kuat 59'	Stadium: Netanya Stadium

=== Third qualifying round ===
28 July 2016 First leg	CS Pandurii Târgu Jiu (Romania)	1–3	(Israel) Maccabi Tel Aviv	Drobeta-Turnu Severin, Romania
21:00	Herea 30'; Voiculeț (yellow card) 43'		Ben Haim FW 6' (yellow card) 38'; Igiebor 49'; D. Peretz (yellow card) 51'; Rikan (yellow card) 62'; Micha 77'; E. Peretz (yellow card) 81'	Stadium: Stadionul Municipal

4 August 2016 Second leg	Maccabi Tel Aviv (Israel)	2–1	(Romania) CS Pandurii Târgu Jiu	Netanya, Israel
	Igiebor 24'; Scarione 80'		Pleașcă 57'	Stadium: Netanya Stadium

=== Playoff round ===
18 August 2016 First leg	Maccabi Tel Aviv (Israel)	2–1	(Croatia) HNK Hajduk Split	Netanya, Israel
20:00	Alberman 8'; Tibi (yellow card) 31'; Scarione 78'; Ben Haim FW (yellow card) 88'		Nižić (yellow card) 53'; Said 55'; Futács (yellow card) 67'; Gentsoglou (yellow card) 82'	Stadium: Netanya Stadium

25 August 2016 Second leg	HNK Hajduk Split (Croatia)	2–1 (3–4 p)	(Israel) Maccabi Tel Aviv	Split, Croatia
	Ćosić 40,59'; Ismajli (yellow card) 53'		Micha (yellow card) 31'; Ben Haim DF (yellow card) 39'; Scarione 52'; Dasa (yellow card) 99'	Stadium: Stadion Poljud
	Penalties
	Vlašić (penalty scored); Tudor (penalty missed); Ohandza (penalty missed); Gentsoglou (penalty scored); Sušić (penalty scored); Ćosić (penalty missed)		Itzhaki (penalty scored); Ben Haim DF (penalty missed); Scarione (penalty missed); Sá (penalty scored); Medunjanin (penalty scored); Rikan (penalty scored)

==== Group stage ====
Pos	Team	Pld	W	D	L	GF	GA	GD	Pts	Qualification	ZEN	AZ	MTA	DUN
1	(Russia) Zenit Saint Petersburg	6	5	0	1	17	8	+9	15	Advance to knockout phase	—	5–0	2–0	2–1
2	(Netherlands) AZ	6	2	2	2	6	10	−4	8	Advance to knockout phase	3–2	—	1–2	1–1
3	(Israel) Maccabi Tel Aviv	6	2	1	3	7	9	−2	7		3–4	0–0	—	2–1
4	(Republic of Ireland) Dundalk	6	1	1	4	5	8	−3	4		1–2	0–1	1–0	—

Source: UEFA
Rules for classification: Group stage tiebreakers

15 September 2016	Maccabi Tel Aviv (Israel)	3–4	(Russia) Zenit Saint Petersburg	Netanya, Israel
20:00	Medunjanin 26', 70' (yellow card) 86'; Kjartansson 50'; Rajković (yellow card) 77'; Dasa (yellow card) 79' (red card) 81'; Micha (yellow card) 83'	Report	Kokorin (yellow card) 19' (goal) 77'; García (yellow card) 57'; Witsel (yellow card) 60'; Maurício 84'; Giuliano 86'; Đorđević 90+2'	Stadium: Netanya Stadium; Referee: Ivan Kružliak (Slovakia)

29 September 2016	Dundalk (Republic of Ireland)	1–0	(Israel) Maccabi Tel Aviv	Dublin, Ireland
21:05	Kilduff 72'; Shields (yellow card) 89'	Report	Ben Haim FW (yellow card) 81'; Ben Haim DF (yellow card) 90'	Stadium: Tallaght Stadium; Referee: Andris Treimanis (Latvia)

20 October 2016	AZ (Netherlands)	1–2	(Israel) Maccabi Tel Aviv	Alkmaar, Netherlands
21:05	Mühren 72'	Report	Scarione 24'; Ben Harush (yellow card) 35'; Medunjanin (yellow card) 67'; Golasa 82'	Stadium: AFAS Stadion; Referee: István Kovács (Romania)

3 November 2016	Maccabi Tel Aviv (Israel)	0–0	(Netherlands) AZ	Netanya, Israel
19:00	Tibi (yellow card) 44'; Dasa (yellow card) 50'; Kjartansson (yellow card) 69'; Benayoun (yellow card) 85'	Report	Luckassen (yellow card) 53'; Johansson (yellow card) 85'	Stadium: Netanya Stadium; Referee: Davide Massa (Italy)

24 November 2016	Zenit Saint Petersburg (Russia)	2–0	(Israel) Maccabi Tel Aviv	Saint Petersburg, Russia
17:00	Kokorin 44'; Criscito (yellow card) 74'; Witsel (yellow card) 79'; A. Kerzhakov 90+1'	Report	Peretz (yellow card) 83'; Yehezkel (yellow card) 88'; Igiebor (yellow card) 89'	Stadium: Petrovsky Stadium; Referee: Aleksandar Stavrev (Macedonia)

8 December 2016	Maccabi Tel Aviv (Israel)	2–1	(Republic of Ireland) Dundalk	Netanya, Israel
19:00	Golasa (yellow card) 10'; Ben Haim II 21' (pen.); Micha 38'	Report	Rogers (yellow card) 20'; Dasa 27' (o.g.); Horgan (yellow card) 75'	Stadium: Netanya Stadium; Referee: Robert Schörgenhofer (Austria)

== Israeli Premier League ==
=== Regular season ===
21 August 2016 1	Maccabi Tel Aviv	3–1	Hapoel Kfar Saba	Jerusalem
20:45	Nosa IgiebordIgiebor (yellow card) 40'; Ben Basat 45'; Ben Haim FW 55' (pen.), 69'; Tibi (yellow card) 75'; Benayoun (yellow card) 90'		Levi (yellow card) 48'; Tchibota 77'	Stadium: Teddy Stadium

28 August 2016 2	F.C. Ashdod	1–2	Maccabi Tel Aviv	Ashdod
21:00	Kinda 40'		Scarione 1'; Ben Haim FW 21'; Alberman (yellow card) 67'; Dasa (yellow card) 87'	Stadium: Yud-Alef Stadium

11 September 2016 3	Maccabi Tel Aviv	2–2	Beitar Jerusalem	Netanya
20:45	Peretz (yellow card) 38'; Igiebor 59' (yellow card) 74'; Ben Haim FW 72' (pen.); Scarione (yellow card) 82'		Shechter (yellow card) 36'; Vered 42'; Abuhatzira 90+4'	Stadium: Netanya Stadium

18 September 2016 4	Hapoel Ra'anana	0–3	Maccabi Tel Aviv	Netanya
20:15			Ben Haim FW (yellow card) 15' (goal) 25', 53'; Rikan 53'; Alberman (yellow card) 55'	Stadium: Netanya Stadium

25 September 2016 5	Maccabi Tel Aviv	5–0	Hapoel Tel Aviv	Netanya
21:00	Igiebor 5'; Ben Haim FW 55', 64' (yellow card) 59'; Kjartansson 75', 83'		Yadin (yellow card) 63'; Shish (yellow card) 63'	Stadium: Netanya Stadium

21 September 2016 6	Bnei Sakhnin	0–3	Maccabi Tel Aviv	Sakhnin
21:00			Scarione 26' (pen.), 88'; Kjartansson 47'	Stadium: Doha Stadium

24 October 2016 7	Maccabi Tel Aviv	0–2	Maccabi Haifa	Netanya
21:00			Atar 16'; Kahat (yellow card) 42'; Kagelmacher 72'	Stadium: Netanya Stadium

30 October 2016 8	Hapoel Be'er Sheva	2–0	Maccabi Tel Aviv	Be'er Sheva
21:00	Sahar 28'; Radi (yellow card) 48'; Buzaglo 62'		Alberman (yellow card) 60'	Stadium: Turner Stadium

6 November 2016 9	Maccabi Tel Aviv	0–0	Maccabi Petah Tikva	Netanya
20:45	Micha (yellow card) 81'		Zhairi (yellow card) 5'; Allyson (yellow card) 42'; Kanyuk (yellow card) 49'; Amos (yellow card) 68'; Elo (yellow card) 82'	Stadium: Netanya Stadium

20 November 2016 10	Ironi Kiryat Shmona	1–2	Maccabi Tel Aviv	Kiryat Shmona
20:15	N'Douassel 5'; Kassio (yellow card) 22'; Shamir (yellow card) 54'; Brossou (yellow card) 55'		Kjartansson 38', 90+3'; Rikan (yellow card) 75'; Igiebor (yellow card) 88'	Stadium: Kiryat Shmona

27 November 2016 11	Bnei Yehuda Tel Aviv	1–0	Maccabi Tel Aviv	Rishon LeZion
20:45	Zhairi (yellow card) 52'; Buzaglo 80'		Tibi (yellow card) 6'	Stadium: Haberfeld Stadium

3 December 2016 12	Maccabi Tel Aviv	0–0	Hapoel Ashkelon	Netanya
18:00	Izrin (yellow card) 29'; Oremuš (yellow card) 57'		Golasa (yellow card) 32'; Ben Haim FW (yellow card) 47'; Rajković (yellow card) 80'; Ben Harush (yellow card) 90+2'	Stadium: Netanya Stadium

11 December 2016 13	Hapoel Haifa	2–4	Maccabi Tel Aviv	Haifa
20:15	Lala 51'; Maman 70'		Rikan (yellow card) 21'; Yehezkel (yellow card) 25'; Micha 34' (yellow card) 44'; Fishler 39' (o.g.); Igeibor (yellow card) 65'; Alberman 79'; Kjartansson 88'	Stadium: Sammy Ofer Stadium

17 December 2016 14	Hapoel Kfar Saba	1–1	Maccabi Tel Aviv	Kfar Saba
16:00	Elbaz 36'; Matović (yellow card) 89'		Yitzhaki 14'; Ben Haim FW (yellow card) 47' (red card) 83'; Ben Haim DF (yellow card) 55'; Dasa (yellow card) 75'; Rajković (yellow card) 89'	Stadium: Levita Stadium

24 December 2016 15	Maccabi Tel Aviv	1–0	F.C. Ashdod	Netanya
18:15	Golasa (yellow card) 32'; Filipenko (yellow card) 40'; Yitzhaki 52'		Zrihan (yellow card) 33'	Stadium: Netanya Stadium

2 January 2017 16	Beitar Jerusalem	1–0	Maccabi Tel Aviv	Jerusalem
21:00	Shechter 38' (pen.); Cohen (yellow card) 72'		Filipenko (yellow card) 37'; Ben Haim DF (yellow card) 43'	Stadium: Teddy Stadium

11 January 2017 17	Maccabi Tel Aviv	4–1	Hapoel Ra'anana	Netanya
20:00	Benayoun 5'; Yitzhaki (yellow card) 21' (goal) 37'; Ben Haim FW 54' (pen.); Rikan (yellow card) 63'; Kjartansson 69'		Babayev (yellow card) 21'; Shaker 51' (yellow card) 60'; Binyamin (yellow card) 52'; Kola (yellow card) 83'	Stadium: Netanya Stadium

16 January 2017 18	Hapoel Tel Aviv	0–1	Maccabi Tel Aviv	Petah Tikva
21:05	Verta (yellow card) 54'; Shish (yellow card) 63'; Reichert (yellow card) 82'		Kjartansson 8'; Tibi (yellow card) 71'; Micha (yellow card) 86'	Stadium: HaMoshava Stadium

22 January 2017 19	Maccabi Tel Aviv	2–1	Bnei Sakhnin	Netanya
21:00	Scarione 15', 78'; Itzhaki (yellow card) 60'; Alberman (yellow card) 63'		Georginho (yellow card) 39' (goal) 73'; Safouri (yellow card) 50' (red card) 90+2'	Stadium: Netanya Stadium

30 January 2017 20	Maccabi Haifa	2–2	Maccabi Tel Aviv	Haifa
21:00	Damari 11'; Kagelmacher (yellow card) 29'; Alushi (yellow card) 34'; Vacek (yellow card) 50'; Kahat 87'		Golasa (yellow card) 15'; Alberman (yellow card) 42'; Kjartansson 66', 90' (yellow card) 73'; Itzhaki (yellow card) 70'; Dasa (yellow card) 90'	Stadium: Sammy Ofer Stadium

4 February 2017 21	Maccabi Tel Aviv	1-0	Hapoel Be'er Sheva	Netanya
21:00	Kjartansson 9'; Alberman (yellow card) 50'; Micha (yellow card) 78'; Dasa (yellow card) 85'; Schoenfeld (yellow card) 90'		Buzaglo (yellow card) 38'; Barda (yellow card) 38'; Taha (yellow card) 48'; Turjeman (yellow card) 68'; Ogu (yellow card) 68'	Stadium: Netanya Stadium

13 February 2017 22	Maccabi Tel Aviv	1-0	Maccabi Petah Tikva	Petah Tikva
21:00	Itzhaki 57'; Marcelo (yellow card) 86'; Scarione (yellow card) 90'		Danino (yellow card) 59'; Kanyuk (yellow card) 61'	Stadium: HaMoshava

18 February 2017 23	Maccabi Tel Aviv	1-0	Ironi Kiryat Shmona	Netanya
20:30	Ben Haim DF (yellow card) 25'; Kjartansson 45', 66', 83'; Yeini (yellow card) 81'		Gozlan (yellow card) 74'	Stadium: Netanya Stadium

25 February 2017 24	Bnei Yehuda Tel Aviv	0-2	Maccabi Tel Aviv	Petah Tikva
20:30	Azuz (yellow card) 35'		Itzhaki 10'; Ben Haim FW (yellow card) 56'; Dasa (yellow card) 87'; Kjartansson 90+2'	Stadium: HaMoshava Stadium

5 March 2017 25	Hapoel Ashkelon	1-2	Maccabi Tel Aviv	Ashkelon
20:15	Izrin (yellow card) 16'; Lingane (yellow card) 33'; Ivančić 90'		Ben Haim FW 16' (pen.); Yeini (yellow card) 18'; Rikan (yellow card) 21'; Itzhaki 50'	Stadium: Sala Stadium

12 March 2017 26	Maccabi Tel Aviv	1-0	Hapoel Haifa	Netanya
20:15	Peretz o.g.' (24); Dasa (yellow card) 63'; Marcelo (yellow card) 90'		Roash (yellow card) 73'

==== Regular season table ====
Pos	Team	Pld	W	D	L	GF	GA	GD	Pts	Qualification or relegation
1	Hapoel Be'er Sheva	26	18	5	3	54	13	+41	59	Qualification for the Championship round
2	Maccabi Tel Aviv	26	17	5	4	45	19	+26	56	Qualification for the Championship round
3	Maccabi Petah Tikva	26	13	9	4	36	23	+13	48	Qualification for the Championship round
4	Beitar Jerusalem	26	10	10	6	34	27	+7	40	Qualification for the Championship round
5	Bnei Sakhnin	26	10	9	7	26	26	0	39	Qualification for the Championship round

Source: Israel Football Association, Soccerway
Rules for classification: 1) Points; 2) Goal difference; 3) Matches won; 4) Goals scored; 5) Head-to-head points; 6) Head-to-head goal difference; 7) Head-to-head goals scored; 8) Play-off.

=== Play-off ===
18 March 2017 27	Maccabi Tel Aviv	3-0	Bnei Sakhnin	Netanya
18:15	Dasa (yellow card) 36'; Itzhaki 56'; Micael 72'; Ben Haim FW 77'		Khalaila (yellow card) 24'; Zbidat (yellow card) 84'	Stadium: Netanya Stadium

1 April 2017 28	Hapoel Be'er Sheva	1-0	Maccabi Tel Aviv	Be'er Sheva
21:10	Sahar 22' (pen.); Vitor (yellow card) 52'		Ben Haim DF (yellow card) 57'; Itzhaki (yellow card) 59'	Stadium: Turner Stadium

9 April 2017 29	Maccabi Tel Aviv	3-0	Maccabi Haifa	Netanya
21:00	Ben Haim FW 28' (72); Micha 38'		Vermouth (yellow card) 75'	Stadium: Netanya Stadium

15 April 2017 30	Maccabi Tel Aviv	2-0	Maccabi Petah Tikva	Netanya
20:30	Amos 10' (o.g.); Micael (yellow card) 34'; Ben Haim FW (yellow card) 41' (goal) 59'; Golasa (yellow card) 56'		Romário (yellow card) 27'; Zhairi (yellow card) 34'; Cuéllar (yellow card) 83'	Stadium: Netanya Stadium

22 April 2017 31	Beitar Jerusalem	1-1	Maccabi Tel Aviv	Jerusalem
21:00	Vered 45'; Rueda (yellow card) 61'; Ezra (yellow card) 71'		Filipenko (yellow card) 13'; Ben Haim FW 14'; Schoenfeld (yellow card) 48'; Rajković (yellow card) 86'	Stadium: Teddy Stadium

25 April 2017 32	Bnei Sakhnin	1-3	Maccabi Tel Aviv	Sakhnin
19:45	Ottman 78'; Sagas (yellow card) 81'		Alberman (yellow card) 36'; Golasa 48'; Kjartansson 57', 89'; Yehezkel (yellow card) 68'	Stadium: Doha Stadium

29 April 2017 33	Maccabi Tel Aviv	1-2	Hapoel Be'er Sheva	Netanya
21:00	Ben Haim DF (yellow card) 9'; Kjartansson 23'; Micha (yellow card) 39'; Micael (yellow card) 81'		Bitton (yellow card) 9'; Korhut (yellow card) 34'; Melikson 57' (yellow card) 58'; Ogu (yellow card) 81' (goal) 89'	Stadium: Netanya Stadium

7 May 2017 34	Maccabi Haifa	0-2	Maccabi Tel Aviv	Haifa
20:10	Alushi (yellow card) 20'; Lavi (yellow card) 43'; Ben David (yellow card) 45'; Kahat (yellow card) 68'		Kjartansson 4'; Rikan 40'; Rajković (yellow card) 45'; Ben Haim DF (yellow card) 60'; Yeini (yellow card) 87'; Golasa (yellow card) 88'	Stadium: Sammy Ofer Stadium

14 May 2017 35	Maccabi Petah Tikva	2-1	Maccabi Tel Aviv	Petah Tikva
20:15	Peser (yellow card) 67'; Salomon 73'; Cohen 90+3'		Alberman (yellow card) 27'; Rikan 59'	Stadium: HaMoshava Stadium

20 May 2017 36	Maccabi Tel Aviv	0-2	Beitar Jerusalem	Netanya
	Ben Haim FW (yellow card) 54'; Ben Haim DF (yellow card) 63'; Dasa (yellow card) 90'		Sabo 12'; Shechter 19'	Stadium: Netanya Stadium

==== Championship round table ====
Pos	Team	Pld	W	D	L	GF	GA	GD	Pts	Qualification
1	Hapoel Be'er Sheva (C, Q)	36	26	7	3	73	18	+55	85	Qualification for the Champions League second qualifying round
2	Maccabi Tel Aviv (Q)	36	22	6	8	61	28	+33	72	Qualification for the Europa League first qualifying round
3	Beitar Jerusalem (Q)	36	16	12	8	53	36	+17	60	Qualification for the Europa League first qualifying round
4	Maccabi Petah Tikva	36	15	11	10	42	34	+8	56	
5	Bnei Sakhnin	36	13	9	14	32	46	−14	48	
6	Maccabi Haifa	36	12	9	15	34	41	−7	45	

Source: Israel Football Association, Soccerway
Rules for classification: 1) Points; 2) Goal difference; 3) Matches won; 4) Goals scored; 5) Head-to-head points; 6) Head-to-head goal difference; 7) Head-to-head goals scored; 8) Play-off.
(C) Champions; (Q) Qualified for the phase indicated

== Israel State Cup ==
7 January 2017 Eighth round	Bnei Lod	0–3	Maccabi Tel Aviv	Lod
18:30	Abu Siam (yellow card) 25'; Reuven (yellow card) 29'; Ninu (yellow card) 45'; Azberga (yellow card) 55'		Kjartansson 23', 26'; Benayoun 58'	Stadium: Lod Municipal Stadium

25 January 2017 Round of 16	Maccabi Tel Aviv	1–1 (4–2 p)	Hapoel Ra'anana	Netanya
19:00	Yehezkel (yellow card) 56'; Kjartansson 102'; Yitzhaki (yellow card) 117'		Gabai (yellow card) 76'; Babayev (yellow card) 107'; Abuhatzira 120' (pen.)	Stadium: Netanya Stadium
	Penalties
	Medunjanin (penalty scored); Yitzhaki (penalty scored); Kjartansson (penalty scored); Peretz (penalty scored)		Nimni (penalty scored); Binyamin (penalty missed); Yanko (penalty scored); Kola (penalty missed)

8 February 2017 qouater final first leg	Maccabi Tel Aviv	1-0	Maccabi Petah Tikva	Petah Tikva
21:00	Yeini (yellow card) 41'; Ben Haim FW (76)		Melamed (yellow card) 44'; Monroy (yellow card) 90+2'	Stadium: HaMoshava

1 March 2017 quarter final second leg	Maccabi Petah Tikva	1-2	Maccabi Tel Aviv	Netanya
21:00	Magbo (yellow card) 38'; Melamed 54' (yellow card) 57'; Solomon (yellow card) 66'; Danino (yellow card) 68'; Romário (yellow card) 75' (red card) 81'; Cuéllar (yellow card) 89'		Kjartansson 50'; Tibi (yellow card) 74'; Scarione 90' (pen.); Ben Haim FW (yellow card) 90'	Stadium: Netanya

5 April 2017 semi final	Beitar Jerusalem	1-2	Maccabi Tel Aviv	Haifa
20:40	Conte (yellow card) 43'; Mori (yellow card) 45+2'; Ezra 89'		Schoenfeld 18' (yellow card) 69'; Micha 60'; Yeini (yellow card) 72'	Stadium: Sammy Ofer Stadium

25 May 2017 final	Bnei Yehuda Tel Aviv	0-0 (3–4 p)	Maccabi Tel Aviv	Jerusalem
21:00	Kandil (yellow card) 2'; Cohen (yellow card) 39'; Mršić (yellow card) 54'		Micael (yellow card) 79'; Dasa (yellow card) 98'; Golasa (yellow card) 101'; Alberman (yellow card) 105'	Stadium: Teddy Stadium
	Penalties
	Valskis (penalty missed); Jovanović (penalty scored); Buzaglo (penalty scored); Gordana (penalty missed); Cohen (penalty scored); Finish (penalty scored)		Alberman (penalty scored); Rikan (penalty scored); Kjartansson (penalty scored); Scarione (penalty missed); Benayoun (penalty missed); Ben Haim I (penalty missed)

== Toto Cup ==
=== Group stage ===
Pos	Team	Pld	W	D	L	GF	GA	GD	Pts	Qualification or relegation
1	Maccabi Tel Aviv	4	3	0	1	7	2	+5	9	Qualified to Quarter-finals
2	Bnei Yehuda	4	2	1	1	5	5	0	7	Qualified to Quarter-finals
3	Hapoel Tel Aviv	4	1	2	1	2	2	0	5	Qualified to Quarter-finals
4	Maccabi Petah Tikva	4	1	1	2	3	3	0	4	
5	Hapoel Ra'anana	4	0	2	2	1	6	−5	2	

Updated to match(es) played on 15 August 2016. Source: Israel Football Association
Rules for classification: 1) points; 2) goal difference; 3) number of wins; 4) goals scored; 5) head to head; 6)deciding match.

31 July 2016 1	Maccabi Tel Aviv	1–0	Maccabi Petah Tikva	Netanya
21:00	Golasa (yellow card) 2'; Ben Basat 61'		Romário (yellow card) 88'	Stadium: Netanya Stadium

7 August 2016 2	Bnei Yehuda Tel Aviv	2–1	Maccabi Tel Aviv	Petah Tikva
21:00	Mršić 14'; Buzaglo 62'; Tomas (yellow card) 88'		Ben Basat (yellow card) 40'; Sá 74'	Stadium: HaMoshava Stadium

10 August 2016 3	Maccabi Tel Aviv	3–0	Hapoel Ra'anana	Netanya
21:00	Igiebor 14'; Dasa (yellow card) 20' (red card) 45'; Micha 61'; Ben Harush (yellow card) 72'; Sá 90'		Babayev (yellow card) 65'	Stadium: Netanya Stadium

16 August 2016 4	Hapoel Tel Aviv	0–2	Maccabi Tel Aviv	Petah Tikva
19:30	Šovšić (yellow card) 40'; Gorobsov (yellow card) 47'; Gotlieb (yellow card) 90'		Ben Basat 9'; Benayoun 11'	Stadium: HaMoshava Stadium

=== Quarter final ===
27 October 2016 First leg	Maccabi Tel Aviv	3–2	Hapoel Ironi Kiryat Shmona	Netanya
21:00	Micha 5'; Ben Basat 43', 69'; Filipenko (yellow card) 51'; Dasa (yellow card) 77'; Lifshitz (yellow card) 83'		N'Douassel 54'; Kriaf 75'	Stadium: Netanya Stadium

30 November 2016 Second leg	Hapoel Ironi Kiryat Shmona	1–0 (3–3 agg.)	Maccabi Tel Aviv	Kiryat Shmona
21:00	Abed 30'		Ben Haim DF (yellow card) 71'

== Squad statistics ==
=== Appearances and goals ===
No.	Pos	Nat	Player	Total		Premier League		State Cup		Toto Cup		UEFA Europa League	
No.	Pos	Nat	Player	Apps	Goals	Apps	Goals	Apps	Goals	Apps	Goals	Apps	Goals
1	DF	(Israel) ISR	Daniel Lifshitz	2	0	1	0	0	0	1	0	0	0
2	DF	(Israel) ISR	Eli Dasa	51	0	31	0	5	0	5	0	10	0
3	DF	(Israel) ISR	Yuval Spungin	10	0	5	0	1	0	4	0	0	0
4	DF	(Brazil) BRA	Ramon Menezes Roma	3	0	3	0	0	0	0	0	0	0
5	MF	(Argentina) ARG	Ezequiel Óscar Scarione	35	9	19	5	4	1	5	0	7	3
6	MF	(Israel) ISR	Gal Alberman	52	2	31	1	4	0	5	0	12	1
9	FW	(Iceland) ISL	Viðar Örn Kjartansson	44	24	33	19	4	4	2	0	5	1
10	FW	(Israel) ISR	Barak Itzhaki	41	7	26	7	4	0	5	0	6	0
11	FW	(Israel) ISR	Tal Ben Haim	52	18	31	14	5	1	4	0	12	3
13	DF	(Israel) ISR	Sheran Yeini	20	0	16	0	4	0	0	0	0	0
14	MF	(Portugal) POR	Rúben Micael	19	1	15	1	4	0	0	0	0	0
15	MF	(Israel) ISR	Dor Micha	55	7	34	2	6	1	3	2	12	2
17	FW	(Israel) ISR	Sagiv Yehezkel	14	0	9	0	2	0	2	0	1	0
18	DF	(Israel) ISR	Eitan Tibi	50	0	26	0	5	0	6	0	13	0
20	DF	(Israel) ISR	Omri Ben Harush	26	0	12	0	2	0	3	0	9	0
21	DF	(Belarus) BLR	Egor Filipenko	33	0	17	0	3	0	6	0	7	0
22	DF	(Israel) ISR	Avi Rikan	30	3	15	3	2	0	5	0	8	0
23	MF	(Israel) ISR	Eyal Golasa	34	2	23	1	2	0	5	0	4	1
25	FW	(Israel) ISR	Aaron Schoenfeld	12	1	10	0	2	1	0	0	0	0
26	DF	(Israel) ISR	Tal Ben Haim	48	0	31	0	4	0	4	0	9	0
29	MF	(Brazil) BRA	Marcelo	5	0	3	0	2	0	0	0	0	0
45	MF	(Israel) ISR	Eliel Peretz	18	0	8	0	2	0	6	0	2	0
51	MF	(Israel) ISR	Yossi Benayoun	48	5	29	1	4	1	4	1	11	2
95	GK	(Serbia) SRB	Predrag Rajković	57	0	35	0	6	0	2	0	14	0
Players away from Maccabi Tel Aviv on loan:
16	MF	(Israel) ISR	Shlomi Azulay	1	0	0	0	0	0	1	0	0	0
55	GK	(Israel) ISR	Haviv Ohayon	3	0	0	0	0	0	3	0	0	0
42	MF	(Israel) ISR	Dor Peretz	18	0	3	0	2	0	6	0	7	0
Players who appeared for Maccabi Tel Aviv that left during the season:
31	DF	(Spain) ESP	Carlos García	1	0	0	0	0	0	0	0	1	0
70	FW	(Portugal) POR	Orlando Sá	10	3	0	0	0	0	3	2	7	1
9	FW	(Israel) ISR	Eden Ben Basat	24	5	10	1	1	0	4	4	9	0
4	MF	(Bosnia and Herzegovina) BIH	Haris Medunjanin	37	2	18	0	2	0	3	0	14	2
40	MF	(Nigeria) NGA	Nosa Igiebor	32	7	15	2	0	0	3	1	14	4
