= 2016–17 in Czech football =

Football in Czech Republic
- Season: 2016–17

Men's football
- Czech First League: Slavia Prague
- Czech National Football League: Sigma Olomouc
- Czech Cup: Zlín

Women's football
- Czech First Division: Slavia Praha

The 2016–17 season is the 24th season of competitive football in the Czech Republic.

== Promotion and relegation ==
=== Pre–season ===
League	Promoted to League	Relegated from League
Czech First League	MFK Karviná; FC Hradec Králové	SK Sigma Olomouc; FC Baník Ostrava
Czech National Football League	1. SK Prostějov; MFK Vítkovice	SK Sigma Olomouc; FK Slavoj Vyšehrad
Czech First Division (women)	FC Zbrojovka Brno; Hradec Králové	FK Bohemians Prague; SK DFO Pardubice

=== Post–season ===
League	Promoted to League	Relegated from League
Czech First League	SK Sigma Olomouc; FC Baník Ostrava	FC Hradec Králové; 1. FK Příbram
Czech National Football League	FK Olympia Prague	1. SK Prostějov
Czech First Division (women)	Lokomotiva Brno H. H.	FC Zbrojovka Brno

== National Teams ==
=== Czech Republic national football team ===
==== 2018 FIFA World Cup qualifying UEFA Group C ====
Pos	Team	Pld	W	D	L	GF	GA	GD	Pts	Qualification
1	Germany	10	10	0	0	43	4	+39	30	Qualification to 2018 FIFA World Cup
2	Northern Ireland	10	6	1	3	17	6	+11	19	Advance to second round
3	Czech Republic	10	4	3	3	17	10	+7	15	
4	Norway	10	4	1	5	17	16	+1	13	
5	Azerbaijan	10	3	1	6	10	19	−9	10	
6	San Marino	10	0	0	10	2	51	−49	0	

Source: FIFA
Rules for classification: Qualification tiebreakers

Win Draw Loss

4 September 2016	Czech Republic	0–0	Northern Ireland	Generali Arena, Prague
20:45 (20:45 UTC+2)		Report (FIFA); Report (UEFA)		Attendance: 10,731; Referee: Anastasios Sidiropoulos (Greece)

8 October 2016	Germany	3–0	Czech Republic	Volksparkstadion, Hamburg
20:45 (20:45 UTC+2)	Müller 13', 65'; Kroos 49'	Report (FIFA); Report (UEFA)		Attendance: 51,299; Referee: Ovidiu Hațegan (Romania)

11 October 2016	Czech Republic	0–0	Azerbaijan	Municipal Stadium, Ostrava
20:45 (20:45 UTC+2)		Report (FIFA); Report (UEFA)		Attendance: 12,148; Referee: Matej Jug (Slovenia)

11 November 2016	Czech Republic	2–1	Norway	Eden Arena, Prague
20:45 (20:45 UTC+1)	Krmenčík 11'; Zmrhal 47'	Report (FIFA); Report (UEFA)	King 87'	Attendance: 16,411; Referee: Bas Nijhuis (Netherlands)

26 March 2017	San Marino	0–6	Czech Republic	San Marino Stadium, Serravalle
18:00 (18:00 UTC+2)		Report (FIFA); Report (UEFA)	Barák 17', 24'; Darida 19', 77' (pen.); Gebre Selassie 26'; Krmenčík 43'	Attendance: 1,023; Referee: Kristo Tohver (Estonia)

10 June 2017	Norway	1–1	Czech Republic	Ullevaal Stadion, Oslo
20:45 (20:45 UTC+2)	Søderlund 55' (pen.)	Report (FIFA); Report (UEFA)	Gebre Selassie 36'	Attendance: 12,179; Referee: Andre Marriner (England)

==== Friendly matches ====
Win Draw Loss

15 November 2016	Czech Republic	1-1	Denmark	Městský stadion, Mladá Boleslav
14:30 (14:30 UTC+1)	Barák 8'	Report	Jørgensen 38'	Attendance: 1,763; Referee: Manuel Schüttengruber (Austria)

=== Czech Republic women's national football team ===
==== UEFA Women's Euro 2017 qualifying ====
Pos	Team	Pld	W	D	L	GF	GA	GD	Pts	Qualification
1	Switzerland	8	8	0	0	34	3	+31	24	Final tournament
2	Italy	8	6	0	2	26	8	+18	18	Final tournament
3	Czech Republic	8	3	1	4	13	18	−5	10	
4	Northern Ireland	8	2	1	5	10	22	−12	7	
5	Georgia	8	0	0	8	2	34	−32	0	

Source: UEFA
Rules for classification: Qualification tiebreakers

3 August 2016	Northern Ireland	1–1	Czech Republic	Mourneview Park, Lurgan
20:30	Furness 55' (pen.)	Report	Chlastáková 35'	Attendance: 332; Referee: Sara Persson (Sweden)

20 September 2016	Italy	3–1	Czech Republic	Stadio Silvio Piola, Vercelli
19:00	Mauro 6', 14'; Guagni 62'	Report	Voňková 13'	Attendance: 2,731; Referee: Sandra Bastos (Portugal)

==== Cyprus Women's Cup ====
Team	Pld	W	D	L	GF	GA	GD	Pts
Republic of Ireland	3	2	1	0	3	0	+3	7
Wales	3	1	1	1	2	1	+1	4
Hungary	3	1	1	1	2	3	−1	4
Czech Republic	3	0	1	2	1	4	−3	1

Win Draw Loss

1 March 2017 Group Stage	Czech Republic	0–2	Republic of Ireland	Tasos Markos Stadium
14:30			Stephanie Roche 25'; Áine O'Gorman 87'

3 March 2017 Group Stage	Wales	0–0	Czech Republic	Tasos Markos Stadium
14:30

6 March 2017 Group Stage	Czech Republic	1–2	Hungary	Tasos Markos Stadium
17:30

8 March 2017 11th Place Game	Italy	6–2	Czech Republic	GSZ Stadium, Larnaca
11:00	Girelli 38', 40'; Parisi 45'; Bonansea 49'; Gabbiadini 55'; Giugliano 90+3'	Report	Chlastáková 9'; Svitková 83' (pen.)

==== Friendly matches ====
Win Draw Loss

24 October 2016	Slovenia	1-0	Czech Republic	National Training Center, Poprad
11:00 (11:00 UTC+1)		Report

== League season ==
=== Men ===
==== Czech First League ====
===== Standings =====
Pos	Team	Pld	W	D	L	GF	GA	GD	Pts	Qualification or relegation
1	Slavia Prague (C)	30	20	9	1	65	22	+43	69	Qualification for the Champions League third qualifying round
2	Viktoria Plzeň	30	20	7	3	47	21	+26	67	Qualification for the Champions League third qualifying round
3	Sparta Prague	30	16	9	5	47	26	+21	57	Qualification for the Europa League third qualifying round
4	Mladá Boleslav	30	13	10	7	47	37	+10	49	Qualification for the Europa League second qualifying round
5	Teplice	30	13	9	8	38	25	+13	48	
6	Fastav Zlín	30	11	8	11	34	35	−1	41	Qualification for the Europa League group stage (Note: Fastav Zlín qualified for the Europa League group stage by winning the 2016–17 Czech Cup.)
7	Dukla Prague	30	11	7	12	39	35	+4	40	
8	Jablonec	30	9	12	9	43	38	+5	39 (Note: Head-to-head record: Slovan 1–1 Jablonec, Jablonec 3–0 Slovan.)	
9	Slovan Liberec	30	10	9	11	31	28	+3	39	
10	Karviná	30	9	7	14	39	49	−10	34	
11	Zbrojovka Brno	30	6	14	10	32	45	−13	32 (Note: Head-to-head record: Zbrojovka 1–0 Slovácko, Slovácko 0–0 Zbrojovka .)	
12	Slovácko	30	6	14	10	29	38	−9	32	
13	Bohemians 1905	30	7	7	16	22	39	−17	28	
14	Vysočina Jihlava	30	6	9	15	26	47	−21	27 (Note: Head-to-head record: Hradec 1–0 Jihlava, Jihlava 3–1 Hradec.)	
15	Hradec Králové (R)	30	8	3	19	29	51	−22	27	Relegation to FNL
16	Příbram (R)	30	6	4	20	29	61	−32	22	Relegation to FNL

Source: Fortuna liga, Soccerway
Rules for classification: 1) Points; 2) Head-to-head points; 3) Head-to-head goal difference; 4) Head-to-head goals scored; 5) Goal difference; 6) Goals scored; 7) Play-off (only if deciding champion, UEFA competitions, or relegation); 8) Draw.
(C) Champions; (R) Relegated

==== Czech National Football League ====
===== Standings =====
Pos	Team	Pld	W	D	L	GF	GA	GD	Pts	Promotion or relegation
1	Sigma Olomouc (C, P)	30	21	6	3	59	22	+37	69	Promotion to 2017–18 I. liga
2	Baník Ostrava (P)	30	18	10	2	48	20	+28	64	Promotion to 2017–18 I. liga
3	Opava	30	19	6	5	61	33	+28	63	
4	Vlašim	30	16	6	8	61	34	+27	54	
5	Dynamo České Budějovice	30	12	10	8	39	31	+8	46	
6	Znojmo	30	11	8	11	49	47	+2	41	
7	Pardubice	30	10	9	11	31	33	−2	39	
8	Ústí nad Labem	30	10	7	13	34	41	−7	37	
9	Viktoria Žižkov (Note: Viktoria Žižkov were deducted 3 points after the season due to late payments of debts to the Czech FA.)	30	10	9	11	49	41	+8	36	
10	Táborsko	30	9	9	12	38	48	−10	36	
11	Varnsdorf	30	10	5	15	44	46	−2	35	
12	Fotbal Třinec	30	9	6	15	40	52	−12	33	
13	Baník Sokolov	30	7	11	12	28	44	−16	32	
14	Vítkovice	30	9	4	17	35	47	−12	31	
15	Frýdek-Místek (Note: Frýdek-Místek were spared from relegation after MSFL winners SK Uničov and next three best-placed teams refused promotion.)	30	7	8	15	40	57	−17	29	
16	Prostějov (R)	30	3	3	24	20	80	−60	12	Relegation to 2017–18 MSFL

Source: Fortuna národní liga
Rules for classification: 1) Points; 2) Goal difference; 3) Goals scored.
(C) Champions; (P) Promoted; (R) Relegated

=== Women ===
==== Czech First Division ====
===== Czech First Division Standings =====
Regular Season

Pos	Team	Pld	W	D	L	GF	GA	GD	Pts	Qualification or relegation
1	Slavia Praha	14	12	2	0	84	8	+76	38	Championship round
2	Sparta Praha	14	11	2	1	72	6	+66	35	Championship round
3	Slovácko	14	10	1	3	46	17	+29	31	Championship round
4	Slovan Liberec	14	6	0	8	21	36	−15	18	Championship round
5	Viktoria Plzeň	14	5	2	7	20	41	−21	17	Relegation round
6	Dukla Praha	14	5	1	8	19	29	−10	16	Relegation round
7	Hradec Králové	14	2	0	12	12	62	−50	6	Relegation round
8	Brno	14	1	0	13	11	86	−75	3	Relegation round

Updated to match(es) played on 16 April 2017. Source: Soccerway
Rules for classification: 1) Points; 2) Goal difference; 3) Number of goals scored

Championship Round

League table

Pos	Team	Pld	W	D	L	GF	GA	GD	Pts	Qualification or relegation
1	Slavia Praha (C, Q)	6	6	0	0	113	12	+101	37	2017–18 UEFA Women's Champions League
2	Sparta Praha (Q)	6	3	1	2	90	12	+78	28	2017–18 UEFA Women's Champions League
3	Slovácko	6	2	1	3	57	31	+26	23	
4	Liberec	6	0	0	6	23	72	−49	9	

Updated to match(es) played on 3 June 2017. Source: Soccerway
Rules for classification: 1) Points; 2) Goal difference; 3) Number of goals scored
(C) Champions; (Q) Qualified for the phase indicated

Relegation Group

League table

Pos	Team	Pld	W	D	L	GF	GA	GD	Pts	Qualification or relegation
1	Dukla Praha	6	4	1	1	32	32	0	21	
2	Viktoria Plzeň	6	3	2	1	32	45	−13	20	
3	Hradec Králové	6	2	1	3	25	73	−48	10	
4	Zbrojovka Brno (R)	6	1	0	5	15	110	−95	5	Relegation to 2017–18 II.liga

Updated to match(es) played on 4 June 2017. Source: Soccerway
Rules for classification: 1) Points; 2) Goal difference; 3) Number of goals scored
(R) Relegated

== Czech clubs in Europe ==
=== UEFA Champions League ===
==== Third qualifying round ====
Team 1	Agg.	Team 2	1st leg	2nd leg
Viktoria Plzeň (Czech Republic)	1–1 (a)	(Azerbaijan) Qarabağ	0–0	1–1
Sparta Prague (Czech Republic)	1–3	(Romania) Steaua București	1–1	0–2

==== Play-off round ====
Team 1	Agg.	Team 2	1st leg	2nd leg
Ludogorets Razgrad (Bulgaria)	4–2	(Czech Republic) Viktoria Plzeň	2–0	2–2

=== UEFA Europa League ===
==== Second qualifying round ====
Team 1	Agg.	Team 2	1st leg	2nd leg
Levadia Tallinn (Estonia)	3–3 (a)	(Czech Republic) Slavia Prague	3–1	0–2

==== Third qualifying round ====
Team 1	Agg.	Team 2	1st leg	2nd leg
Slavia Prague (Czech Republic)	1–1 (a)	(Portugal) Rio Ave	0–0	1–1
Shkëndija (North Macedonia)	2–1	(Czech Republic) Mladá Boleslav	2–0	0–1
Admira Wacker Mödling (Austria)	1–4	(Czech Republic) Slovan Liberec	1–2	0–2

==== Group stage ====
===== Group E =====
Pos	Team	Pld	W	D	L	GF	GA	GD	Pts	Qualification	ROM	AG	PLZ	AW
1	(Italy) Roma	6	3	3	0	16	7	+9	12	Advance to knockout phase	—	4–0	4–1	3–3
2	(Romania) Astra Giurgiu	6	2	2	2	7	10	−3	8	Advance to knockout phase	0–0	—	1–1	2–3
3	(Czech Republic) Viktoria Plzeň	6	1	3	2	7	10	−3	6		1–1	1–2	—	3–2
4	Austria Wien	6	1	2	3	11	14	−3	5		2–4	1–2	0–0	—

Source: UEFA

===== Group J =====
Pos	Team	Pld	W	D	L	GF	GA	GD	Pts	Qualification	FIO	PAOK	QRB	LIB
1	(Italy) Fiorentina	6	4	1	1	15	6	+9	13	Advance to knockout phase	—	2–3	5–1	3–0
2	(Greece) PAOK	6	3	1	2	7	6	+1	10	Advance to knockout phase	0–0	—	0–1	2–0
3	(Azerbaijan) Qarabağ	6	2	1	3	7	12	−5	7		1–2	2–0	—	2–2
4	(Czech Republic) Slovan Liberec	6	1	1	4	7	12	−5	4		1–3	1–2	3–0	—

Source: UEFA

===== Group K =====
Pos	Team	Pld	W	D	L	GF	GA	GD	Pts	Qualification	SPP	HBS	SOU	INT
1	(Czech Republic) Sparta Prague	6	4	0	2	8	6	+2	12	Advance to knockout phase	—	2–0	1–0	3–1
2	(Israel) Hapoel Be'er Sheva	6	2	2	2	6	6	0	8	Advance to knockout phase	0–1	—	0–0	3–2
3	(England) Southampton	6	2	2	2	6	4	+2	8		3–0	1–1	—	2–1
4	(Italy) Internazionale	6	2	0	4	7	11	−4	6		2–1	0–2	1–0	—

Source: UEFA

==== Knockout phase ====
===== Round of 32 =====
Team 1	Agg.	Team 2	1st leg	2nd leg
Rostov (Russia)	5–1	(Czech Republic) Sparta Prague	4–0	1–1

=== UEFA Women's Champions League ===
==== Round of 32 ====
Team 1	Agg.	Team 2	1st leg	2nd leg
Twente (Netherlands)	5-1	(Czech Republic) Sparta Praha	2-1	3–1
Apollon Limassol (Cyprus)	3-4	(Czech Republic) Slavia Praha	1-1	2-3

==== Round of 16 ====
Team 1	Agg.	Team 2	1st leg	2nd leg
Slavia Praha (Czech Republic)	1-6	(Sweden) Rosengård	1-3	0-3
