= Haviv Ohayon =

Israeli footballer (born 1998)

Haviv Ohayon חביב אוחיון
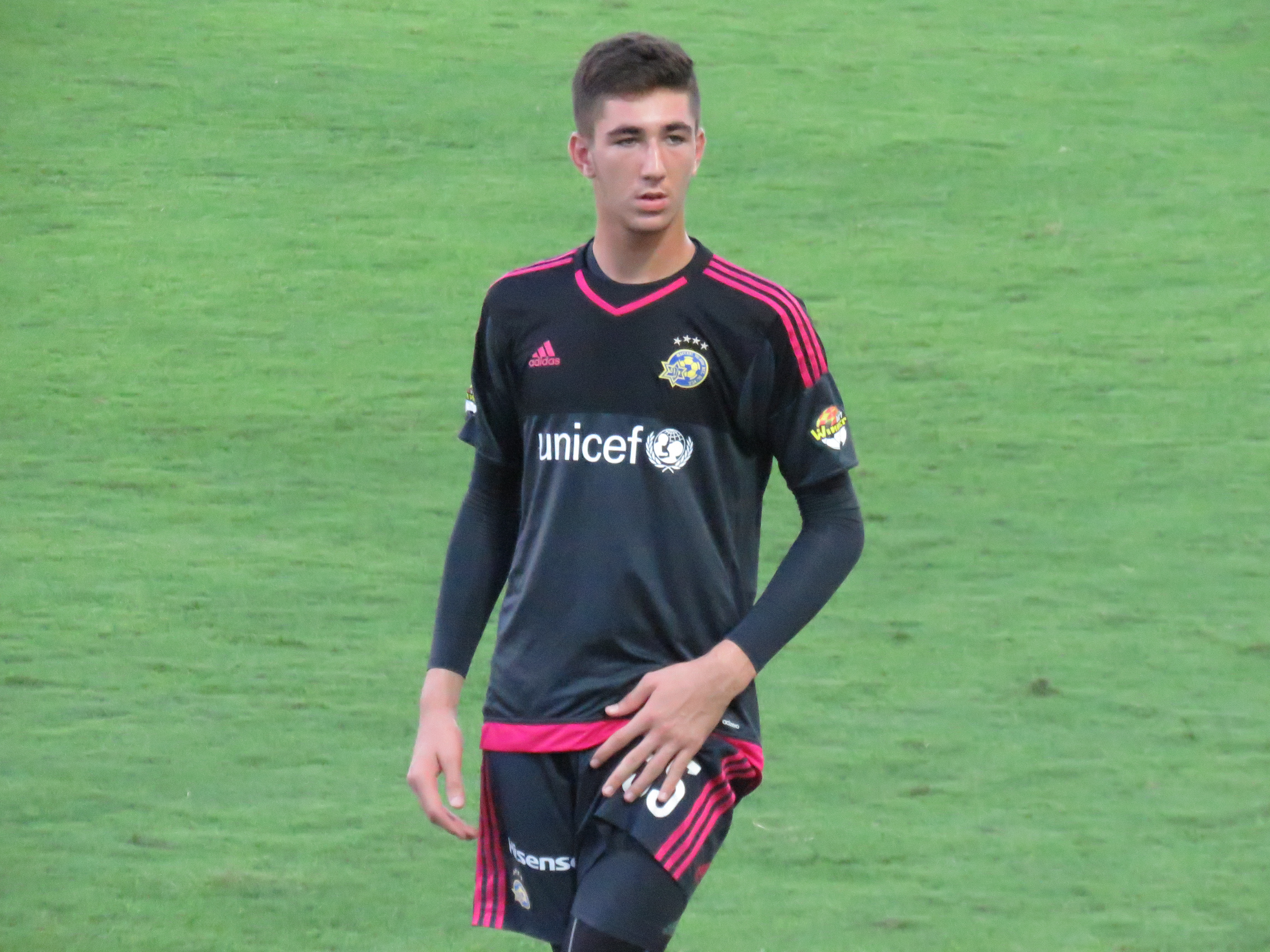

Personal information
- Full name: Haviv Ohayon
- Date of birth: 17 August 1998 (age 28)
- Place of birth: Petah Tikva, Israel
- Height: 1.95 m (6 ft 5 in)
- Position: Goalkeeper

Team information
- Current team: Hapoel Hadera

Youth career
- 2007–2011: Maccabi Petah Tikva
- 2011–2013: Hapoel Hod HaSharon
- 2013–: Maccabi Tel Aviv
- 2016–2017: → Watford U23s (loan)

Senior career*
Years	Team	Apps	(Gls)
2014–	Maccabi Tel Aviv	0	(0)
2019–	→ Hapoel Hadera (loan)	7	(0)

International career
2013–2014	Israel U-16	8	(0)
2013–2015	Israel U-17	11	(0)
2015–2016	Israel U-18	5	(0)
2015–	Israel U-19	12	(0)
- * Club domestic league appearances and goals as of 1 June 2019

Haviv Ohayon (Hebrew: חביב אוחיון; born 17 August 1998) is an Israeli footballer who plays for Hapoel Hadera on loan from Maccabi Tel Aviv.

== Career ==
Seen as a precocious talent, Ohayon joined the Maccabi Tel Aviv senior team at the age of 17 and became their third goalkeeper behind Juan Pablo Colinas and Barak Levi. On 10 August 2015 he made his debut in a 3–0 loss to Maccabi Petah Tikva.

Following a trial with English Premier League side Watford in January 2016, Ohayon joined the club's under-23 team on loan in the following August. Meanwhile, he also extended his Maccabi Tel Aviv contract for another five years.

In 2019, he stopped playing for years due to suffering a head injury at the beach.

== Trophies ==
Maccabi Tel Aviv

- Israeli Premier League (1): 2014–15
- Israel State Cup (1): 2014-15
- Toto Cup (1): 2014–15

== Club career statistics ==
As of match played 27 November 2016

Appearances and goals by club, season and competition
Club	Season	League		Cup		League Cup		Europe		Total	
Club	Season	Apps	Goals	Apps	Goals	Apps	Goals	Apps	Goals	Apps	Goals
Maccabi Tel Aviv	2015–16	0	0	0	0	2	0	0 (Note: Appearance(s) in UEFA Europa League)	0	2	0
Maccabi Tel Aviv	2016–17	0	0	0	0	3	0	0	0	3	0
Career total		0	0	0	0	5	0	0	0	5	0
