= Orlando Sá =

Portuguese former professional footballer

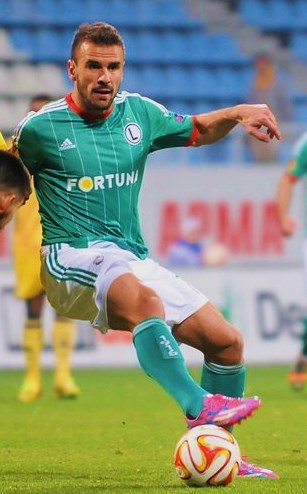
- Sá playing for Legia Warsaw in 2014

Personal information
- Full name: Orlando Carlos Braga de Sá
- Date of birth: 26 May 1988 (age 38)
- Place of birth: Barcelos, Portugal
- Height: 1.88 m (6 ft 2 in)
- Position: Striker

Youth career
- 1999–2004: Esposende
- 2004–2007: Braga

Senior career*
| Years | Team | Apps | (Gls) |
| 2007–2009 | Braga | 10 | (2) |
| 2007–2008 | → Maria Fonte (loan) | 26 | (6) |
| 2009–2011 | Porto | 2 | (0) |
| 2010–2011 | → Nacional (loan) | 16 | (3) |
| 2011–2012 | Fulham | 7 | (1) |
| 2012–2014 | AEL Limassol | 39 | (18) |
| 2014–2015 | Legia Warsaw | 33 | (14) |
| 2014 | Legia Warsaw II | 1 | (2) |
| 2015–2016 | Reading | 19 | (5) |
| 2016 | Maccabi Tel Aviv | 10 | (2) |
| 2016–2018 | Standard Liège | 52 | (26) |
| 2018 | Henan Jianye | 5 | (1) |
| 2018–2020 | Standard Liège | 18 | (1) |
| 2020–2021 | Málaga | 18 | (0) |
| Total | | 256 | (81) |

International career
| 2007 | Portugal U19 | 9 | (0) |
| 2008 | Portugal U20 | 9 | (3) |
| 2008–2010 | Portugal U21 | 6 | (7) |
| 2010–2011 | Portugal U23 | 2 | (2) |
| 2009 | Portugal | 1 | (0) |
- * Club domestic league appearances and goals

Orlando Carlos Braga de Sá (born 26 May 1988) is a Portuguese former professional footballer who played as a striker.

After spending his early career with Braga and Porto, appearing sparingly for both, he travelled abroad in 2011, going on to represent clubs in England, Cyprus, Poland, Israel, Belgium, China and Spain and win the Ekstraklasa and the Polish Cup with Legia Warsaw.

Sá earned one cap for Portugal.

== Club career ==
=== Braga ===
Sá was born in Barcelos, Braga District. He finished his youth career with S.C. Braga, and was promoted to the first team for the 2007–08 season only to be loaned immediately to lowly SC Maria da Fonte (third division).

Sá returned to Braga in 2008, making his Primeira Liga debut on 5 January 2009 by playing one minute in a 2–0 home win against C.F. Os Belenenses. He scored his first goal in the competition on 8 March, as a late substitute in a 2–2 draw at C.F. Estrela da Amadora.

During his spell, Sá attracted the attention of English club Chelsea, but nothing ever materialised.

=== Porto ===
On 1 June 2009, Sá moved to league champions FC Porto for an estimated fee of €3 million; Braga retained 20% economic rights on any future transfer fee, with an additional 20% being held by unknown parties. Having arrived still injured from his previous club, he only made his competitive debut on 2 January 2010, starting in a 2–0 away victory over U.D. Oliveirense in the fourth round of the Taça de Portugal.

Sá spent 2010–11 on loan to C.D. Nacional, appearing sparingly due to injury and technical decisions. His highlight was scoring the winner in a 2–1 home defeat of S.L. Benfica on 21 August 2010, and he finished the season with seven official goals, including two for the Portugal under-23 team.

=== Fulham ===
At the end of the 2011 transfer window, Sá joined Premier League club Fulham on a free transfer, with Porto retaining 25% of his economic rights. He made his official debut for his new team in a Football League Cup tie against Chelsea at Stamford Bridge on 21 September (penalty shootout loss), and first appeared in the Premier League at West Bromwich Albion three days later, playing the full 90 minutes in a 0–0 draw.

Sá scored his only goal on 31 December 2011, putting the visitors ahead in the seventh minute of an eventual 1–1 draw at Norwich City. Early into the season, he struggled with the pace of the English game, but went on to adapt physically after a few months in the country, also stating he was improving his ability in the English language.

Before the 2012–13 campaign started, Sá said he was going to improve at Fulham and told the club's official website: "I feel that this is a really important pre-season for me, I want to be really prepared ahead of the new campaign because I want this year to be my year. I hope that I can score more goals like the one I got against Norwich. That was a good moment for me and I hope I will have many more moments like the one I experienced at Carrow Road". On 30 June 2012, however, his contract was terminated by mutual agreement.

=== AEL Limassol ===
On 30 July 2012, Sá signed a three-year deal with AEL Limassol. He scored his first goal in European competition on 6 December, helping his team achieve a 3–0 home win against Olympique de Marseille in the group stage of the UEFA Europa League.

Sá kickstarted the 2013–14 campaign by netting five times in only three Cypriot First Division matches. Coincidentally, the three opponents that suffered his accuracy in the first round of matches, Ethnikos Achna FC, APOEL FC and Enosis Neon Paralimni FC, met the same fate in the second.

=== Legia Warsaw ===
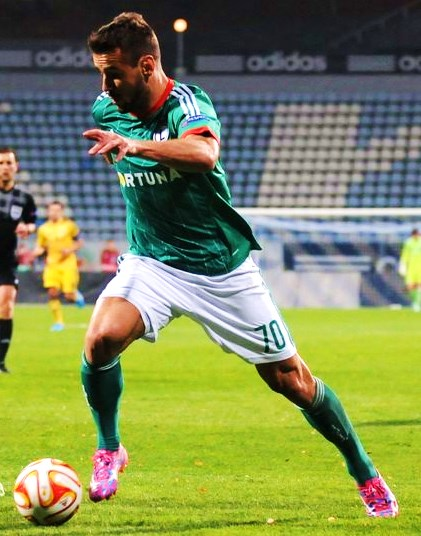
Sá in action for Legia in October 2014

On 14 February 2014, Sá moved to Poland by joining Legia Warsaw on a three-and-a-half-year contract. He had arrived in Warsaw to undergo a medical the previous day.

Sá made his Ekstraklasa debut on 22 February 2014, in a 3–0 win over Górnik Zabrze. He scored his first goal on the last day of the season to contribute to the 3–1 victory at Zagłębie Lubin, and the Legionaires went on to win their tenth national championship.

=== Reading ===
On 29 June 2015, Sá agreed to a three-year deal at Reading. He made his debut for the club on 8 August in the season opener away to Birmingham City, having an added-time penalty saved by Tomasz Kuszczak in the 2–1 Championship defeat.

Sá scored his first goal on 29 August, heading home in a 3–1 away win against Brentford. In the following match, he grabbed a hat-trick in a 5–1 rout of Ipswich Town at the Madejski Stadium. He totalled five goals from 21 appearances across all competitions, with his presence eventually limited by new manager Brian McDermott.

=== Maccabi and Standard ===
On 26 January 2016, Sá signed a three-and-a-half-year contract with Maccabi Tel Aviv F.C. for an undisclosed fee. On 31 August, however, he joined Standard Liège for four seasons. He scored a career-best 17 goals – 20 in all competitions – in his debut campaign with the latter, but they could only finish ninth in the Belgian Pro League.

On 28 February 2018, Sá transferred to Henan Jianye F.C. in the Chinese Super League. Five months later, however, he rejoined Standard.

=== Málaga ===
Sá moved teams and countries again on 13 August 2020, after agreeing to a one-year deal with Málaga CF of the Spanish Segunda División. On 26 May 2021, exactly on his 33rd birthday, he announced his retirement from professional football due to an achilles tendon injury.

== International career ==
On 18 November 2008, in one of his first caps for the Portugal under-21 team, Sá scored a hat-trick against Spain in a 4–1 friendly home win. In February of the following year, he was surprisingly called up to the senior squad by coach Carlos Queiroz for a friendly with Finland, and replaced Hugo Almeida at the hour mark in an eventual 1–0 victory in Faro.

== Personal life ==
Sá married pop singer Teresa Villa-Lobos.

== Career statistics ==
As of 14 July 2016

Appearances and goals by club, season and competition
| Club | Season | League | | | National cup (Note: Includes Taça de Portugal, Cypriot Cup, Polish Cup, FA Cup, Israel State Cup) | | League cup (Note: Includes Taça da Liga, EFL Cup) | | Continental | | Other | | Total | |
| Club | Season | Division | Apps | Goals | Apps | Goals | Apps | Goals | Apps | Goals | Apps | Goals | Apps | Goals |
|---|---|---|---|---|---|---|---|---|---|---|---|---|---|---|
| Braga | 2007–08 | Primeira Liga | 0 | 0 | 0 | 0 | 0 | 0 | 0 | 0 | — | | 0 | 0 |
| Braga | 2008–09 | Primeira Liga | 10 | 2 | 0 | 0 | 0 | 0 | 5 (Note: Four appearances in UEFA Cup, one appearance in UEFA Intertoto Cup) | 0 | — | | 15 | 2 |
| Braga | Total | | 10 | 2 | 0 | 0 | 0 | 0 | 5 | 0 | — | | 15 | 2 |
| Maria Fonte | 2007–08 | Segunda Divisão | 26 | 6 | 2 | 0 | — | | — | | — | | 28 | 6 |
| Porto | 2009–10 | Primeira Liga | 2 | 0 | 3 | 0 | 5 | 1 | 0 | 0 | — | | 10 | 1 |
| Nacional | 2010–11 | Primeira Liga | 16 | 3 | 1 | 2 | 2 | 0 | — | | — | | 19 | 5 |
| Fulham | 2011–12 | Premier League | 7 | 1 | 0 | 0 | 1 | 0 | 4 (Note: Appearances in UEFA Europa League) | 0 | — | | 12 | 1 |
| AEL Limassol | 2012–13 | Cypriot First Division | 20 | 5 | 6 | 1 | — | | 5 | 1 | 1 (Note: Appearance in Cypriot Super Cup) | 0 | 32 | 7 |
| AEL Limassol | 2013–14 | Cypriot First Division | 19 | 13 | 0 | 0 | — | | — | | — | | 19 | 13 |
| AEL Limassol | Total | | 39 | 18 | 6 | 1 | — | | 5 | 1 | 1 | 0 | 51 | 20 |
| Legia Warsaw | 2013–14 | Ekstraklasa | 7 | 1 | 0 | 0 | — | | — | | — | | 7 | 1 |
| Legia Warsaw | 2014–15 | Ekstraklasa | 26 | 13 | 2 | 0 | — | | 7 (Note: One appearance in UEFA Champions League, six appearances and one goal in UEFA Europa League) | 1 | — | | 35 | 14 |
| Legia Warsaw | Total | | 33 | 14 | 2 | 0 | — | | 7 | 1 | — | | 42 | 15 |
| Legia Warsaw II | 2013–14 | III liga, group A | 1 | 2 | — | | — | | — | | — | | 1 | 2 |
| Reading | 2015–16 | Championship | 19 | 5 | 1 | 0 | 1 | 0 | — | | — | | 21 | 5 |
| Maccabi Tel Aviv | 2015–16 | Israeli Premier League | 10 | 2 | 2 | 1 | 0 | 0 | — | | — | | 12 | 3 |
| Maccabi Tel Aviv | 2016–17 | Israeli Premier League | 0 | 0 | 0 | 0 | 0 | 0 | 3 | 1 | — | | 3 | 1 |
| Maccabi Tel Aviv | Total | | 10 | 2 | 2 | 1 | — | | 3 | 1 | — | | 15 | 4 |
| Career total | | | 163 | 53 | 17 | 4 | 9 | 1 | 24 | 3 | 1 | 0 | 214 | 61 |

== Honours ==
Porto

- Taça de Portugal: 2009–10

Legia Warsaw

- Ekstraklasa: 2013–14
- Polish Cup: 2014–15
