= Aneta Pospíšilová =

Czech footballer

Personal information
- Date of birth: 9 December 1991 (age 34)
- Place of birth: Czechoslovakia
- Height: 1.60 m (5 ft 3 in)
- Position: Forward

Senior career*
Years	Team	Apps	(Gls)
- Zbrojovka Brno

International career^{‡}
2009	Czech Republic	1	(0)
- * Club domestic league appearances and goals ‡ National team caps and goals as of 31 December 2011

Aneta Pospíšilová is a Czech football player, who played for Zbrojovka Brno in the Czech First Division.

She is a member of the Czech national team. She made her debut for the national team on 25 October 2009 in a match against Wales.
