= 2016–17 UEFA Europa League group stage =

International football competition

The 2016–17 UEFA Europa League group stage began on 15 September and ended on 9 December 2016. A total of 48 teams competed in the group stage to decide 24 of the 32 places in the knockout phase of the 2016–17 UEFA Europa League.

== Draw ==
The draw was held on 26 August 2016, 13:00 CEST, at the Grimaldi Forum in Monaco. The 48 teams were drawn into twelve groups of four, with the restriction that teams from the same association could not be drawn against each other. For the draw, the teams were seeded into four pots based on their 2016 UEFA club coefficients.

Moreover, the draw was controlled for teams from the same association in order to split the teams evenly into the two sets of groups (A–F, G–L) for maximum television coverage.

The fixtures were decided after the draw. On each matchday, six groups played their matches at 19:00 CEST/CET, while the other six groups played their matches at 21:05 CEST/CET, with the two sets of groups (A–F, G–L) alternating between each matchday. There were other restrictions: for example, teams from the same city in general did not play at home on the same matchday (UEFA tried to avoid teams from the same city playing at home on the same day, due to logistics and crowd control), and teams in certain countries (e.g. Russia) did not play at home on the last matchday (due to cold weather and simultaneous kick-off times).

On 17 July 2014, the UEFA emergency panel ruled that Ukrainian and Russian clubs would not be drawn against each other "until further notice" due to the political unrest between the countries. Therefore, Ukrainian clubs Shakhtar Donetsk (Pot 1) and Zorya Luhansk (Pot 4) and Russian clubs Zenit Saint Petersburg (Pot 1) and Krasnodar (Pot 3) could not be drawn into the same group.

== Teams ==
Below were the participating teams (with their 2016 UEFA club coefficients), grouped by their seeding pot. They included 16 teams which entered in this stage, the 22 winners of the play-off round, and the 10 losers of the Champions League play-off round.

Key to colours
Group winners and runners-up advanced to the round of 32

Pot 1
Team	Notes	Coeff
(Germany) Schalke 04		96.035
(Russia) Zenit Saint Petersburg		93.216
(England) Manchester United		82.256
(Ukraine) Shakhtar Donetsk		81.976
(Spain) Athletic Bilbao		75.142
(Greece) Olympiacos		70.940
(Spain) Villarreal		60.142
(Netherlands) Ajax		58.112
(Italy) Internazionale		58.087
(Italy) Fiorentina		57.087
(Belgium) Anderlecht		54.000
(Czech Republic) Viktoria Plzeň		44.585

Pot 2
Team	Notes	Coeff
(Netherlands) AZ		43.612
(Portugal) Braga		43.116
(Austria) Red Bull Salzburg		42.520
(Italy) Roma		41.587
(Turkey) Fenerbahçe		40.920
(Czech Republic) Sparta Prague		40.585
(Greece) PAOK		37.440
(Romania) Steaua București		36.576
(Belgium) Genk		36.000
(Cyprus) APOEL		35.935
(Belgium) Standard Liège		27.500
(France) Saint-Étienne		26.049

Pot 3
Team	Notes	Coeff
(Belgium) Gent		25.000
(Switzerland) Young Boys		24.755
(Russia) Krasnodar		24.216
(Austria) Rapid Wien		23.520
(Czech Republic) Slovan Liberec		22.085
(Spain) Celta Vigo		21.142
(Israel) Maccabi Tel Aviv		20.225
(Netherlands) Feyenoord		19.112
Austria Wien		19.020
(Germany) Mainz 05		18.035
(Switzerland) Zürich		17.755
(England) Southampton		16.756

Pot 4
Team	Notes	Coeff
(Greece) Panathinaikos		14.940
(Italy) Sassuolo		14.087
(Azerbaijan) Qarabağ		13.475
(Kazakhstan) Astana		12.575
(France) Nice		12.049
(Ukraine) Zorya Luhansk		11.976
(Romania) Astra Giurgiu		11.076
(Turkey) Konyaspor		6.920
(Turkey) Osmanlıspor		6.920
(Azerbaijan) Gabala		5.225
(Israel) Hapoel Be'er Sheva		4.725
(Republic of Ireland) Dundalk		2.590

Notes

1. ^{EL-PO} Winners of the play-off round.
2. ^{CL-CR} Losers of the Champions League play-off round (Champions Route).
3. ^{CL-LR} Losers of the Champions League play-off round (League Route).

== Format ==
In each group, teams played against each other home-and-away in a round-robin format. The group winners and runners-up advanced to the round of 32, where they were joined by the eight third-placed teams from the Champions League group stage.

=== Tiebreakers ===
The teams were ranked according to points (3 points for a win, 1 point for a draw, 0 points for a loss). If two or more teams were equal on points on completion of the group matches, the following criteria were applied in the order given to determine the rankings (regulations Article 16.01):

1. higher number of points obtained in the group matches played among the teams in question;
2. superior goal difference from the group matches played among the teams in question;
3. higher number of goals scored in the group matches played among the teams in question;
4. higher number of goals scored away from home in the group matches played among the teams in question;
5. if, after having applied criteria 1 to 4 (to a set of three or more teams), a subset of those teams still had an equal ranking, criteria 1 to 4 were reapplied exclusively to the matches between the tied teams in question to determine their final rankings. If this procedure did not lead to a decision, criteria 6 to 12 applied;
6. superior goal difference in all group matches;
7. higher number of goals scored in all group matches;
8. higher number of away goals scored in all group matches;
9. higher number of wins in all group matches;
10. higher number of away wins in all group matches;
11. lower disciplinary points total based only on yellow and red cards received in all group matches (red card = 3 points, yellow card = 1 point, expulsion for two yellow cards in one match = 3 points);
12. higher club coefficient.

== Groups ==
The matchdays were 15 September, 29 September, 20 October, 3 November, 24 November, and 8 December 2016. The match kickoff times were 19:00 and 21:05 CEST/CET, except for certain matches in Azerbaijan, Kazakhstan and Russia. The match kickoff times for matchdays 5 and 6 in Turkey, and all simultaneous matches in the same group on matchday 6, were changed to 17:00 CET due to the decision of the Turkish government to use the UTC+3 time zone all year round starting from September 2016.

Times up to 29 October 2016 (matchdays 1–3) were CEST (UTC+2), thereafter (matchdays 4–6) times were CET (UTC+1).

=== Group A ===
Pos	Team	Pld	W	D	L	GF	GA	GD	Pts	Qualification	FEN	MU	FEY	ZOR
1	(Turkey) Fenerbahçe	6	4	1	1	8	6	+2	13	Advance to knockout phase	—	2–1	1–0	2–0
2	(England) Manchester United	6	4	0	2	12	4	+8	12	Advance to knockout phase	4–1	—	4–0	1–0
3	(Netherlands) Feyenoord	6	2	1	3	3	7	−4	7		0–1	1–0	—	1–0
4	(Ukraine) Zorya Luhansk	6	0	2	4	2	8	−6	2		1–1	0–2	1–1	—

Source: UEFA
Rules for classification: Group stage tiebreakers
15 September 2016
19:00

Feyenoord (Netherlands)	1–0	(England) Manchester United
Vilhena 79'	Report

De Kuip, Rotterdam
Attendance: 31,000
Referee: Jesús Gil Manzano (Spain)
15 September 2016
19:00

Zorya Luhansk (Ukraine)	1–1	(Turkey) Fenerbahçe
Hrechyshkin 52'	Report	Kjær 90+5'

Chornomorets Stadium, Odesa (Note: Zorya Luhansk played their home matches at Chornomorets Stadium, Odesa, instead of their regular stadium Avanhard Stadium, Luhansk, due to the war conditions in Eastern Ukraine.)
Attendance: 16,000
Referee: István Kovács (Romania)

29 September 2016
21:05

Fenerbahçe (Turkey)	1–0	(Netherlands) Feyenoord
Emenike 18'	Report

Şükrü Saracoğlu Stadium, Istanbul
Attendance: 16,500
Referee: Jonas Eriksson (Sweden)
29 September 2016
21:05

Manchester United (England)	1–0	(Ukraine) Zorya Luhansk
Ibrahimović 69'	Report

Old Trafford, Manchester
Attendance: 58,179
Referee: Orel Grinfeld (Israel)

20 October 2016
21:05

Manchester United (England)	4–1	(Turkey) Fenerbahçe
Pogba 31' (pen.), 45+1'; Martial 34' (pen.); Lingard 48'	Report	Van Persie 83'

Old Trafford, Manchester
Attendance: 73,063
Referee: Benoît Bastien (France)
20 October 2016
21:05

Feyenoord (Netherlands)	1–0	(Ukraine) Zorya Luhansk
Jørgensen 55'	Report

De Kuip, Rotterdam
Attendance: 35,000
Referee: Andris Treimanis (Latvia)

3 November 2016
19:00

Fenerbahçe (Turkey)	2–1	(England) Manchester United
Sow 2'; Lens 59'	Report	Rooney 89'

Şükrü Saracoğlu Stadium, Istanbul
Attendance: 35,378
Referee: Milorad Mažić (Serbia)
3 November 2016
19:00

Zorya Luhansk (Ukraine)	1–1	(Netherlands) Feyenoord
Forster 44'	Report	Jørgensen 15'

Chornomorets Stadium, Odesa
Attendance: 16,855
Referee: Jakob Kehlet (Denmark)

24 November 2016
17:00

Fenerbahçe (Turkey)	2–0	(Ukraine) Zorya Luhansk
Stoch 59'; Kjær 67'	Report

Şükrü Saracoğlu Stadium, Istanbul
Attendance: 16,145
Referee: Harald Lechner (Austria)
24 November 2016
21:05

Manchester United (England)	4–0	(Netherlands) Feyenoord
Rooney 35'; Mata 69'; Jones 75' (o.g.); Lingard 90+2'	Report

Old Trafford, Manchester
Attendance: 64,628
Referee: Manuel Gräfe (Germany)

8 December 2016
19:00

Feyenoord (Netherlands)	0–1	(Turkey) Fenerbahçe
	Report	Sow 22'

De Kuip, Rotterdam
Attendance: 32,000
Referee: David Fernández Borbalán (Spain)
8 December 2016
19:00

Zorya Luhansk (Ukraine)	0–2	(England) Manchester United
	Report	Mkhitaryan 48'; Ibrahimović 88'

Chornomorets Stadium, Odesa
Attendance: 25,900
Referee: Tamás Bognár (Hungary)

=== Group B ===
Pos	Team	Pld	W	D	L	GF	GA	GD	Pts	Qualification	APO	OLY	YB	AST
1	(Cyprus) APOEL	6	4	0	2	8	6	+2	12	Advance to knockout phase	—	2–0	1–0	2–1
2	(Greece) Olympiacos	6	2	2	2	7	6	+1	8	Advance to knockout phase	0–1	—	1–1	4–1
3	(Switzerland) Young Boys	6	2	2	2	7	4	+3	8		3–1	0–1	—	3–0
4	(Kazakhstan) Astana	6	1	2	3	5	11	−6	5		2–1	1–1	0–0	—

Source: UEFA
Rules for classification: Group stage tiebreakers
15 September 2016
19:00

Young Boys (Switzerland)	0–1	(Greece) Olympiacos
	Report	Cambiasso 42'

Stade de Suisse, Bern
Attendance: 11,132
Referee: Serhiy Boyko (Ukraine)
15 September 2016
19:00

APOEL (Cyprus)	2–1	(Kazakhstan) Astana
Vinícius 75'; de Camargo 87'	Report	Maksimović 45+1'

GSP Stadium, Nicosia
Attendance: 12,008
Referee: Aleksandar Stavrev (Macedonia)

29 September 2016
17:00

Astana (Kazakhstan)	0–0	(Switzerland) Young Boys
	Report

Astana Arena, Astana
Attendance: 21,328
Referee: Simon Lee Evans (Wales)
29 September 2016
21:05

Olympiacos (Greece)	0–1	(Cyprus) APOEL
	Report	Sotiriou 10'

Karaiskakis Stadium, Piraeus
Attendance: 24,378
Referee: Paweł Gil (Poland)

20 October 2016
21:05

Olympiacos (Greece)	4–1	(Kazakhstan) Astana
Figueiras 25'; Elyounoussi 33'; Sebá 34', 65'	Report	Kabananga 54'

Karaiskakis Stadium, Piraeus
Attendance: 21,480
Referee: Tobias Stieler (Germany)
20 October 2016
21:05

Young Boys (Switzerland)	3–1	(Cyprus) APOEL
Hoarau 18', 52', 82' (pen.)	Report	Efrem 14'

Stade de Suisse, Bern
Attendance: 9,553
Referee: Tobias Welz (Germany)

3 November 2016
17:00

Astana (Kazakhstan)	1–1	(Greece) Olympiacos
Despotović 8'	Report	Sebá 30'

Astana Arena, Astana
Attendance: 12,158
Referee: Orel Grinfeld (Israel)
3 November 2016
19:00

APOEL (Cyprus)	1–0	(Switzerland) Young Boys
Sotiriou 69'	Report

GSP Stadium, Nicosia
Attendance: 12,761
Referee: Sébastien Delferière (Belgium)

24 November 2016
17:00

Astana (Kazakhstan)	2–1	(Cyprus) APOEL
Aničić 59'; Despotović 84'	Report	Efrem 31'

Astana Arena, Astana
Attendance: 9,143
Referee: Kevin Blom (Netherlands)
24 November 2016
21:05

Olympiacos (Greece)	1–1	(Switzerland) Young Boys
Fortounis 48'	Report	Hoarau 58'

Karaiskakis Stadium, Piraeus
Attendance: 24,131
Referee: Miroslav Zelinka (Czech Republic)

8 December 2016
19:00

Young Boys (Switzerland)	3–0	(Kazakhstan) Astana
Frey 63'; Hoarau 66'; Schick 71'	Report

Stade de Suisse, Bern
Attendance: 7,616
Referee: Clayton Pisani (Malta)
8 December 2016
19:00

APOEL (Cyprus)	2–0	(Greece) Olympiacos
da Costa 19' (o.g.); de Camargo 83'	Report

GSP Stadium, Nicosia
Attendance: 14,779
Referee: Carlos del Cerro Grande (Spain)

=== Group C ===
Pos	Team	Pld	W	D	L	GF	GA	GD	Pts	Qualification	SET	AND	MNZ	QAB
1	(France) Saint-Étienne	6	3	3	0	8	5	+3	12	Advance to knockout phase	—	1–1	0–0	1–0
2	(Belgium) Anderlecht	6	3	2	1	16	8	+8	11	Advance to knockout phase	2–3	—	6–1	3–1
3	(Germany) Mainz 05	6	2	3	1	8	10	−2	9		1–1	1–1	—	2–0
4	(Azerbaijan) Gabala	6	0	0	6	5	14	−9	0		1–2	1–3	2–3	—

Source: UEFA
Rules for classification: Group stage tiebreakers
15 September 2016
19:00

Mainz 05 (Germany)	1–1	(France) Saint-Étienne
Bungert 57'	Report	Berić 88'

Opel Arena, Mainz
Attendance: 20,275
Referee: Svein Oddvar Moen (Norway)
15 September 2016
19:00

Anderlecht (Belgium)	3–1	(Azerbaijan) Gabala
Teodorczyk 14'; Rafael 41' (o.g.); Capel 77'	Report	Dabo 20'

Constant Vanden Stock Stadium, Brussels
Attendance: 11,638
Referee: Harald Lechner (Austria)

29 September 2016
17:00

Gabala (Azerbaijan)	2–3	(Germany) Mainz 05
Qurbanov 57' (pen.); Zenjov 62'	Report	Muto 41'; Córdoba 68'; Öztunalı 78'

Bakcell Arena, Baku (Note: Gabala played their home matches at Bakcell Arena, Baku, instead of their regular stadium City Stadium, Qabala, which did not meet UEFA requirements.)
Attendance: 6,500
Referee: Gediminas Mažeika (Lithuania)
29 September 2016
21:05

Saint-Étienne (France)	1–1	(Belgium) Anderlecht
Roux 90+4'	Report	Tielemans 62' (pen.)

Stade Geoffroy-Guichard, Saint-Étienne
Attendance: 23,258
Referee: Vladislav Bezborodov (Russia)

20 October 2016
21:05

Saint-Étienne (France)	1–0	(Azerbaijan) Gabala
Ricardinho 70' (o.g.)	Report

Stade Geoffroy-Guichard, Saint-Étienne
Attendance: 22,855
Referee: Ali Palabıyık (Turkey)
20 October 2016
21:05

Mainz 05 (Germany)	1–1	(Belgium) Anderlecht
Mallı 10' (pen.)	Report	Teodorczyk 65'

Opel Arena, Mainz
Attendance: 21,317
Referee: Jesús Gil Manzano (Spain)

3 November 2016
19:00

Gabala (Azerbaijan)	1–2	(France) Saint-Étienne
Qurbanov 39'	Report	Tannane 45+1'; Berić 53'

Bakcell Arena, Baku
Attendance: 5,600
Referee: Carlos del Cerro Grande (Spain)
3 November 2016
19:00

Anderlecht (Belgium)	6–1	(Germany) Mainz 05
Stanciu 9', 41'; Tielemans 62'; Teodorczyk 89', 90+4' (pen.); Bruno 90+2'	Report	De Blasis 15'

Constant Vanden Stock Stadium, Brussels
Attendance: 13,275
Referee: Andreas Ekberg (Sweden)

24 November 2016
17:00

Gabala (Azerbaijan)	1–3	(Belgium) Anderlecht
Ricardinho 15' (pen.)	Report	Tielemans 11'; Bruno 90'; Teodorczyk 90+4'

Bakcell Arena, Baku
Attendance: 4,500
Referee: Ievgenii Aranovskyi (Ukraine)
24 November 2016
21:05

Saint-Étienne (France)	0–0	(Germany) Mainz 05
	Report

Stade Geoffroy-Guichard, Saint-Étienne
Attendance: 21,750
Referee: Bas Nijhuis (Netherlands)

8 December 2016
19:00

Mainz 05 (Germany)	2–0	(Azerbaijan) Gabala
Hack 30'; De Blasis 40'	Report

Opel Arena, Mainz
Attendance: 12,860
Referee: Simon Lee Evans (Wales)
8 December 2016
19:00

Anderlecht (Belgium)	2–3	(France) Saint-Étienne
Chipciu 21'; Stanciu 31'	Report	Søderlund 62', 67'; Monnet-Paquet 74'

Constant Vanden Stock Stadium, Brussels
Attendance: 13,583
Referee: István Kovács (Romania)

=== Group D ===
Pos	Team	Pld	W	D	L	GF	GA	GD	Pts	Qualification	ZEN	AZ	MTA	DUN
1	(Russia) Zenit Saint Petersburg	6	5	0	1	17	8	+9	15	Advance to knockout phase	—	5–0	2–0	2–1
2	(Netherlands) AZ	6	2	2	2	6	10	−4	8	Advance to knockout phase	3–2	—	1–2	1–1
3	(Israel) Maccabi Tel Aviv	6	2	1	3	7	9	−2	7		3–4	0–0	—	2–1
4	(Republic of Ireland) Dundalk	6	1	1	4	5	8	−3	4		1–2	0–1	1–0	—

Source: UEFA
Rules for classification: Group stage tiebreakers
15 September 2016
19:00

AZ (Netherlands)	1–1	(Republic of Ireland) Dundalk
Wuytens 61'	Report	Kilduff 89'

AFAS Stadion, Alkmaar
Attendance: 10,003
Referee: Clayton Pisani (Malta)
15 September 2016
19:00

Maccabi Tel Aviv (Israel)	3–4	(Russia) Zenit Saint Petersburg
Medunjanin 26', 70'; Kjartansson 50'	Report	Kokorin 77'; Maurício 84'; Giuliano 86'; Đorđević 90+2'

Netanya Stadium, Netanya (Note: Maccabi Tel Aviv played their home matches at Netanya Stadium, Netanya, instead of their regular stadium Bloomfield Stadium, Tel Aviv.)
Attendance: 10,855
Referee: Ivan Kružliak (Slovakia)

29 September 2016
21:05

Zenit Saint Petersburg (Russia)	5–0	(Netherlands) AZ
Kokorin 26', 59'; Giuliano 48'; Criscito 66' (pen.); Shatov 80'	Report

Petrovsky Stadium, Saint Petersburg
Attendance: 15,275
Referee: Xavier Estrada Fernández (Spain)
29 September 2016
21:05

Dundalk (Republic of Ireland)	1–0	(Israel) Maccabi Tel Aviv
Kilduff 72'	Report

Tallaght Stadium, Tallaght (Note: Dundalk played their home matches at Tallaght Stadium, Tallaght, instead of their regular stadium Oriel Park, Dundalk.)
Attendance: 5,543
Referee: Andris Treimanis (Latvia)

20 October 2016
21:05

Dundalk (Republic of Ireland)	1–2	(Russia) Zenit Saint Petersburg
Benson 52'	Report	Mak 71'; Giuliano 77'

Tallaght Stadium, Tallaght
Attendance: 5,500
Referee: Miroslav Zelinka (Czech Republic)
20 October 2016
21:05

AZ (Netherlands)	1–2	(Israel) Maccabi Tel Aviv
Mühren 72'	Report	Scarione 24'; Golasa 82'

AFAS Stadion, Alkmaar
Attendance: 12,016
Referee: István Kovács (Romania)

3 November 2016
19:00

Zenit Saint Petersburg (Russia)	2–1	(Republic of Ireland) Dundalk
Giuliano 42', 78'	Report	Horgan 52'

Petrovsky Stadium, Saint Petersburg
Attendance: 17,723
Referee: Luca Banti (Italy)
3 November 2016
19:00

Maccabi Tel Aviv (Israel)	0–0	(Netherlands) AZ
	Report

Netanya Stadium, Netanya
Attendance: 11,356
Referee: Davide Massa (Italy)

24 November 2016
17:00

Zenit Saint Petersburg (Russia)	2–0	(Israel) Maccabi Tel Aviv
Kokorin 44'; A. Kerzhakov 90+1'	Report

Petrovsky Stadium, Saint Petersburg
Attendance: 15,843
Referee: Aleksandar Stavrev (Macedonia)
24 November 2016
21:05

Dundalk (Republic of Ireland)	0–1	(Netherlands) AZ
	Report	Weghorst 9'

Tallaght Stadium, Tallaght
Attendance: 5,500
Referee: István Vad (Hungary)

8 December 2016
19:00

AZ (Netherlands)	3–2	(Russia) Zenit Saint Petersburg
Rienstra 7'; Haps 43'; Tanković 68'	Report	Giuliano 58'; Wuytens 80' (o.g.)

AFAS Stadion, Alkmaar
Attendance: 13,713
Referee: Svein Oddvar Moen (Norway)
8 December 2016
19:00

Maccabi Tel Aviv (Israel)	2–1	(Republic of Ireland) Dundalk
Ben Haim II 21' (pen.); Micha 38'	Report	Dasa 27' (o.g.)

Netanya Stadium, Netanya
Attendance: 9,891
Referee: Robert Schörgenhofer (Austria)

=== Group E ===
Pos	Team	Pld	W	D	L	GF	GA	GD	Pts	Qualification	ROM	AG	PLZ	AW
1	(Italy) Roma	6	3	3	0	16	7	+9	12	Advance to knockout phase	—	4–0	4–1	3–3
2	(Romania) Astra Giurgiu	6	2	2	2	7	10	−3	8	Advance to knockout phase	0–0	—	1–1	2–3
3	(Czech Republic) Viktoria Plzeň	6	1	3	2	7	10	−3	6		1–1	1–2	—	3–2
4	Austria Wien	6	1	2	3	11	14	−3	5		2–4	1–2	0–0	—

Source: UEFA
Rules for classification: Group stage tiebreakers
15 September 2016
19:00

Viktoria Plzeň (Czech Republic)	1–1	(Italy) Roma
Bakoš 11'	Report	Perotti 4' (pen.)

Doosan Arena, Plzeň
Attendance: 10,326
Referee: Ruddy Buquet (France)
15 September 2016
19:00

Astra Giurgiu (Romania)	2–3	Austria Wien
Alibec 18'; Săpunaru 74'	Report	Holzhauser 16' (pen.); Friesenbichler 33'; Grünwald 58'

Arena Națională, Bucharest (Note: Astra Giurgiu played their home matches at Arena Națională, Bucharest, instead of their regular stadium Stadionul Marin Anastasovici, Giurgiu.)
Attendance: 3,300
Referee: Andreas Ekberg (Sweden)

29 September 2016
21:05

Austria Wien	0–0	(Czech Republic) Viktoria Plzeň
	Report

Ernst-Happel-Stadion, Vienna (Note: Austria Wien played their home matches at Ernst-Happel-Stadion, Vienna, instead of their regular stadium Franz Horr Stadium, Vienna.)
Attendance: 16,509
Referee: John Beaton (Scotland)
29 September 2016
21:05

Roma (Italy)	4–0	(Romania) Astra Giurgiu
Strootman 15'; Fazio 45+2'; Fabrício 47' (o.g.); Salah 55'	Report

Stadio Olimpico, Rome
Attendance: 13,509
Referee: Aliyar Aghayev (Azerbaijan)

20 October 2016
21:05

Roma (Italy)	3–3	Austria Wien
El Shaarawy 19', 34'; Florenzi 69'	Report	Holzhauser 16'; Prokop 82'; Kayode 84'

Stadio Olimpico, Rome
Attendance: 16,478
Referee: Vladislav Bezborodov (Russia)
20 October 2016
21:05

Viktoria Plzeň (Czech Republic)	1–2	(Romania) Astra Giurgiu
Hořava 86'	Report	Alibec 41'; Hořava 64' (o.g.)

Doosan Arena, Plzeň
Attendance: 9,440
Referee: Aleksei Eskov (Russia)

3 November 2016
19:00

Austria Wien	2–4	(Italy) Roma
Kayode 2'; Grünwald 89'	Report	Džeko 5', 65'; De Rossi 15'; Nainggolan 78'

Ernst-Happel-Stadion, Vienna
Attendance: 32,751
Referee: Xavier Estrada Fernández (Spain)
3 November 2016
19:00

Astra Giurgiu (Romania)	1–1	(Czech Republic) Viktoria Plzeň
Stan 19'	Report	Krmenčík 25'

Arena Națională, Bucharest
Attendance: 1,450
Referee: Alon Yefet (Israel)

24 November 2016
21:05

Roma (Italy)	4–1	(Czech Republic) Viktoria Plzeň
Džeko 11', 61', 88'; Matějů 82' (o.g.)	Report	Zeman 18'

Stadio Olimpico, Rome
Attendance: 13,789
Referee: Tobias Stieler (Germany)
24 November 2016
21:05

Austria Wien	1–2	(Romania) Astra Giurgiu
Rotpuller 57'	Report	Florea 79'; Budescu 88' (pen.)

Ernst-Happel-Stadion, Vienna
Attendance: 14,127
Referee: Paweł Raczkowski (Poland)

8 December 2016
19:00

Viktoria Plzeň (Czech Republic)	3–2	Austria Wien
Hořava 44'; Ďuriš 72', 84'	Report	Holzhauser 19' (pen.); Rotpuller 40'

Doosan Arena, Plzeň
Attendance: 9,117
Referee: Serhiy Boyko (Ukraine)
8 December 2016
19:00

Astra Giurgiu (Romania)	0–0	(Italy) Roma
	Report

Arena Națională, Bucharest
Attendance: 7,100
Referee: Hüseyin Göçek (Turkey)

=== Group F ===
Pos	Team	Pld	W	D	L	GF	GA	GD	Pts	Qualification	GNK	ATH	RW	SAS
1	(Belgium) Genk	6	4	0	2	13	9	+4	12	Advance to knockout phase	—	2–0	1–0	3–1
2	(Spain) Athletic Bilbao	6	3	1	2	10	11	−1	10	Advance to knockout phase	5–3	—	1–0	3–2
3	(Austria) Rapid Wien	6	1	3	2	7	8	−1	6		3–2	1–1	—	1–1
4	(Italy) Sassuolo	6	1	2	3	9	11	−2	5		0–2	3–0	2–2	—

Source: UEFA
Rules for classification: Group stage tiebreakers
15 September 2016
19:00

Rapid Wien (Austria)	3–2	(Belgium) Genk
Schwab 51'; Joelinton 59'; Colley 60' (o.g.)	Report	Bailey 29', 90' (pen.)

Allianz Stadion, Vienna
Attendance: 21,800
Referee: Kevin Blom (Netherlands)
15 September 2016
19:00

Sassuolo (Italy)	3–0	(Spain) Athletic Bilbao
Lirola 60'; Defrel 75'; Politano 82'	Report

Mapei Stadium – Città del Tricolore, Reggio Emilia
Attendance: 7,032
Referee: Paweł Raczkowski (Poland)

29 September 2016
21:05

Athletic Bilbao (Spain)	1–0	(Austria) Rapid Wien
Beñat 59'	Report

San Mamés, Bilbao
Attendance: 34,039
Referee: Tony Chapron (France)
29 September 2016
21:05

Genk (Belgium)	3–1	(Italy) Sassuolo
Karelis 8'; Bailey 25'; Buffel 61'	Report	Politano 65'

Luminus Arena, Genk
Attendance: 9,130
Referee: Liran Liany (Israel)

20 October 2016
21:05

Genk (Belgium)	2–0	(Spain) Athletic Bilbao
Brabec 40'; Ndidi 83'	Report

Luminus Arena, Genk
Attendance: 9,530
Referee: Stefan Johannesson (Sweden)
20 October 2016
21:05

Rapid Wien (Austria)	1–1	(Italy) Sassuolo
Schaub 7'	Report	Schrammel 66' (o.g.)

Allianz Stadion, Vienna
Attendance: 22,200
Referee: Hugo Miguel (Portugal)

3 November 2016
19:00

Athletic Bilbao (Spain)	5–3	(Belgium) Genk
Aduriz 8', 24' (pen.), 44' (pen.), 74', 90+4' (pen.)	Report	Bailey 28'; Ndidi 51'; Sušić 80'

San Mamés, Bilbao
Attendance: 33,417
Referee: Martin Atkinson (England)
3 November 2016
19:00

Sassuolo (Italy)	2–2	(Austria) Rapid Wien
Defrel 34'; Pellegrini 45+2'	Report	Jelić 86'; Kvilitaia 90'

Mapei Stadium – Città del Tricolore, Reggio Emilia
Attendance: 7,838
Referee: Craig Pawson (England)

24 November 2016
21:05

Genk (Belgium)	1–0	(Austria) Rapid Wien
Karelis 11'	Report

Luminus Arena, Genk
Attendance: 9,406
Referee: Ivan Kružliak (Slovakia)
24 November 2016
21:05

Athletic Bilbao (Spain)	3–2	(Italy) Sassuolo
García 10'; Aduriz 58'; Lekue 79'	Report	Balenziaga 2' (o.g.); Ragusa 83'

San Mamés, Bilbao
Attendance: 37,806
Referee: Viktor Kassai (Hungary)

8 December 2016
19:00

Rapid Wien (Austria)	1–1	(Spain) Athletic Bilbao
Joelinton 72'	Report	Saborit 84'

Allianz Stadion, Vienna
Attendance: 21,500
Referee: Serdar Gözübüyük (Netherlands)
9 December 2016 (Note: The Sassuolo v Genk match, originally scheduled on 8 December 2016, 19:00, was postponed to the following day due to heavy fog.)
12:30

Sassuolo (Italy)	0–2	(Belgium) Genk
	Report	Heynen 58'; Trossard 80'

Mapei Stadium – Città del Tricolore, Reggio Emilia
Attendance: 1,154
Referee: Orel Grinfeld (Israel)

=== Group G ===
Pos	Team	Pld	W	D	L	GF	GA	GD	Pts	Qualification	AJX	CLT	STL	PAN
1	(Netherlands) Ajax	6	4	2	0	11	6	+5	14	Advance to knockout phase	—	3–2	1–0	2–0
2	(Spain) Celta Vigo	6	2	3	1	10	7	+3	9	Advance to knockout phase	2–2	—	1–1	2–0
3	(Belgium) Standard Liège	6	1	4	1	8	6	+2	7		1–1	1–1	—	2–2
4	(Greece) Panathinaikos	6	0	1	5	3	13	−10	1		1–2	0–2	0–3	—

Source: UEFA
Rules for classification: Group stage tiebreakers
15 September 2016
21:05

Standard Liège (Belgium)	1–1	(Spain) Celta Vigo
Dossevi 3'	Report	Rossi 13'

Stade Maurice Dufrasne, Liège
Attendance: 10,723
Referee: Hüseyin Göçek (Turkey)
15 September 2016
21:05

Panathinaikos (Greece)	1–2	(Netherlands) Ajax
Berg 5'	Report	Traoré 33'; Riedewald 67'

Leoforos Alexandras Stadium, Athens
Attendance: 13,019
Referee: Andre Marriner (England)

29 September 2016
19:00

Ajax (Netherlands)	1–0	(Belgium) Standard Liège
Dolberg 28'	Report

Amsterdam Arena, Amsterdam
Attendance: 31,352
Referee: Paolo Mazzoleni (Italy)
29 September 2016
19:00

Celta Vigo (Spain)	2–0	(Greece) Panathinaikos
Guidetti 84'; Wass 89'	Report

Balaídos, Vigo
Attendance: 15,726
Referee: Luca Banti (Italy)

20 October 2016
19:00

Celta Vigo (Spain)	2–2	(Netherlands) Ajax
Fontàs 29'; Orellana 82'	Report	Ziyech 22'; Younes 71'

Balaídos, Vigo
Attendance: 18,397
Referee: Ivan Kružliak (Slovakia)
20 October 2016
19:00

Standard Liège (Belgium)	2–2	(Greece) Panathinaikos
Edmilson 45+1' (pen.); Belfodil 82'	Report	Ibarbo 12', 36'

Stade Maurice Dufrasne, Liège
Attendance: 14,463
Referee: Daniel Stefański (Poland)

3 November 2016
21:05

Ajax (Netherlands)	3–2	(Spain) Celta Vigo
Dolberg 41'; Ziyech 68'; Younes 71'	Report	Guidetti 79'; Aspas 86'

Amsterdam Arena, Amsterdam
Attendance: 44,545
Referee: Paweł Raczkowski (Poland)
3 November 2016
21:05

Panathinaikos (Greece)	0–3	(Belgium) Standard Liège
	Report	Cissé 61'; Belfodil 76', 90+3'

Leoforos Alexandras Stadium, Athens
Attendance: 10,837
Referee: Serhiy Boyko (Ukraine)

24 November 2016
19:00

Celta Vigo (Spain)	1–1	(Belgium) Standard Liège
Aspas 8'	Report	Laifis 81'

Balaídos, Vigo
Attendance: 16,470
Referee: Benoît Bastien (France)
24 November 2016
19:00

Ajax (Netherlands)	2–0	(Greece) Panathinaikos
Schöne 40'; Tete 50'	Report

Amsterdam Arena, Amsterdam
Attendance: 41,011
Referee: Aleksei Eskov (Russia)

8 December 2016
21:05

Standard Liège (Belgium)	1–1	(Netherlands) Ajax
Raman 85'	Report	El Ghazi 27'

Stade Maurice Dufrasne, Liège
Attendance: 20,344
Referee: Bobby Madden (Scotland)
8 December 2016
21:05

Panathinaikos (Greece)	0–2	(Spain) Celta Vigo
	Report	Guidetti 4'; Orellana 76' (pen.)

Leoforos Alexandras Stadium, Athens
Attendance: 4,005
Referee: Andris Treimanis (Latvia)

=== Group H ===
Pos	Team	Pld	W	D	L	GF	GA	GD	Pts	Qualification	SHK	GNT	BRA	KON
1	(Ukraine) Shakhtar Donetsk	6	6	0	0	21	5	+16	18	Advance to knockout phase	—	5–0	2–0	4–0
2	(Belgium) Gent	6	2	2	2	9	13	−4	8	Advance to knockout phase	3–5	—	2–2	2–0
3	(Portugal) Braga	6	1	3	2	9	11	−2	6		2–4	1–1	—	3–1
4	(Turkey) Konyaspor	6	0	1	5	2	12	−10	1		0–1	0–1	1–1	—

Source: UEFA
Rules for classification: Group stage tiebreakers
15 September 2016
21:05

Konyaspor (Turkey)	0–1	(Ukraine) Shakhtar Donetsk
	Report	Ferreyra 75'

Torku Arena, Konya
Attendance: 26,860
Referee: Robert Schörgenhofer (Austria)
15 September 2016
21:05

Braga (Portugal)	1–1	(Belgium) Gent
Pinto 24'	Report	Milićević 6'

Estádio Municipal, Braga
Attendance: 8,903
Referee: Benoît Bastien (France)

29 September 2016
19:00

Gent (Belgium)	2–0	(Turkey) Konyaspor
Sayef 17'; Neto 33'	Report

Ghelamco Arena, Ghent
Attendance: 15,870
Referee: István Vad (Hungary)
29 September 2016
19:00

Shakhtar Donetsk (Ukraine)	2–0	(Portugal) Braga
Stepanenko 5'; Kovalenko 56'	Report

Arena Lviv, Lviv (Note: Shakhtar Donetsk played their home matches at Arena Lviv, Lviv, instead of their regular stadium, Donbas Arena in Donetsk, due to the war in Donbas.)
Attendance: 11,938
Referee: Tobias Stieler (Germany)

20 October 2016
19:00

Shakhtar Donetsk (Ukraine)	5–0	(Belgium) Gent
Kovalenko 12'; Ferreyra 30'; Bernard 46'; Taison 75'; Malyshev 85'	Report

Arena Lviv, Lviv
Attendance: 10,505
Referee: Anthony Taylor (England)
20 October 2016
19:00

Konyaspor (Turkey)	1–1	(Portugal) Braga
Milošević 9'	Report	Hassan 55'

Torku Arena, Konya
Attendance: 24,968
Referee: Aliyar Aghayev (Azerbaijan)

3 November 2016
21:05

Gent (Belgium)	3–5	(Ukraine) Shakhtar Donetsk
Coulibaly 1'; Perbet 83'; Milićević 89'	Report	Marlos 36' (pen.); Taison 41'; Stepanenko 45+3'; Fred 68'; Ferreyra 87'

Ghelamco Arena, Ghent
Attendance: 14,526
Referee: Aleksei Kulbakov (Belarus)
3 November 2016
21:05

Braga (Portugal)	3–1	(Turkey) Konyaspor
Velázquez 34'; Eduardo 45+1'; Horta 90+7'	Report	Rangelov 30'

Estádio Municipal, Braga
Attendance: 7,729
Referee: Alexandru Tudor (Romania)

24 November 2016
19:00

Shakhtar Donetsk (Ukraine)	4–0	(Turkey) Konyaspor
Bardakcı 11' (o.g.); Dentinho 36'; Eduardo 66'; Bernard 74'	Report

Arena Lviv, Lviv
Attendance: 10,021
Referee: Kevin Clancy (Scotland)
24 November 2016
19:00

Gent (Belgium)	2–2	(Portugal) Braga
Coulibaly 32'; Milićević 40'	Report	Stojiljković 14'; Hassan 36'

Ghelamco Arena, Ghent
Attendance: 19,650
Referee: Vladislav Bezborodov (Russia)

8 December 2016
17:00

Konyaspor (Turkey)	0–1	(Belgium) Gent
	Report	Coulibaly 90+4'

Torku Arena, Konya
Attendance: 10,720
Referee: Jakob Kehlet (Denmark)
8 December 2016
17:00

Braga (Portugal)	2–4	(Ukraine) Shakhtar Donetsk
Stojiljković 43'; Vukčević 89'	Report	Kryvtsov 22', 62'; Taison 39', 66'

Estádio Municipal, Braga
Attendance: 15,084
Referee: Ali Palabıyık (Turkey)

=== Group I ===
Pos	Team	Pld	W	D	L	GF	GA	GD	Pts	Qualification	SCH	KRA	SAL	NCE
1	(Germany) Schalke 04	6	5	0	1	9	3	+6	15	Advance to knockout phase	—	2–0	3–1	2–0
2	(Russia) Krasnodar	6	2	1	3	8	8	0	7	Advance to knockout phase	0–1	—	1–1	5–2
3	(Austria) Red Bull Salzburg	6	2	1	3	6	6	0	7		2–0	0–1	—	0–1
4	(France) Nice	6	2	0	4	5	11	−6	6		0–1	2–1	0–2	—

Source: UEFA
Rules for classification: Group stage tiebreakers
15 September 2016
21:05

Red Bull Salzburg (Austria)	0–1	(Russia) Krasnodar
	Report	Joãozinho 37'

Red Bull Arena, Wals-Siezenheim
Attendance: 6,507
Referee: Miroslav Zelinka (Czech Republic)
15 September 2016
21:05

Nice (France)	0–1	(Germany) Schalke 04
	Report	Rahman 75'

Allianz Riviera, Nice
Attendance: 21,378
Referee: Alberto Undiano Mallenco (Spain)

29 September 2016
19:00

Schalke 04 (Germany)	3–1	(Austria) Red Bull Salzburg
Goretzka 15'; Ćaleta-Car 47' (o.g.); Höwedes 58'	Report	Soriano 72'

Veltins-Arena, Gelsenkirchen
Attendance: 48,374
Referee: Serdar Gözübüyük (Netherlands)
29 September 2016
19:00

Krasnodar (Russia)	5–2	(France) Nice
Smolov 22'; Joãozinho 33', 65' (pen.); Ari 86', 90+3'	Report	Balotelli 43'; Cyprien 71'

Kuban Stadium, Krasnodar
Attendance: 10,750
Referee: Ivan Bebek (Croatia)

20 October 2016
19:00

Krasnodar (Russia)	0–1	(Germany) Schalke 04
	Report	Konoplyanka 11'

Krasnodar Stadium, Krasnodar
Attendance: 33,550
Referee: Mark Clattenburg (England)
20 October 2016
19:00

Red Bull Salzburg (Austria)	0–1	(France) Nice
	Report	Pléa 13'

Red Bull Arena, Wals-Siezenheim
Attendance: 9,473
Referee: Ievgenii Aranovskyi (Ukraine)

3 November 2016
21:05

Schalke 04 (Germany)	2–0	(Russia) Krasnodar
Caiçara 25'; Bentaleb 28'	Report

Veltins-Arena, Gelsenkirchen
Attendance: 42,210
Referee: Slavko Vinčić (Slovenia)
3 November 2016
21:05

Nice (France)	0–2	(Austria) Red Bull Salzburg
	Report	Hwang Hee-chan 72', 73'

Allianz Riviera, Nice
Attendance: 17,582
Referee: Hüseyin Göçek (Turkey)

24 November 2016
19:00

Krasnodar (Russia)	1–1	(Austria) Red Bull Salzburg
Smolov 85'	Report	Dabbur 37'

Krasnodar Stadium, Krasnodar
Attendance: 19,150
Referee: Liran Liany (Israel)
24 November 2016
19:00

Schalke 04 (Germany)	2–0	(France) Nice
Konoplyanka 14'; Aogo 80' (pen.)	Report

Veltins-Arena, Gelsenkirchen
Attendance: 51,504
Referee: Aliyar Aghayev (Azerbaijan)

8 December 2016
21:05

Red Bull Salzburg (Austria)	2–0	(Germany) Schalke 04
Schlager 22'; Radošević 90+4'	Report

Red Bull Arena, Wals-Siezenheim
Attendance: 23,133
Referee: Radu Petrescu (Romania)
8 December 2016
21:05

Nice (France)	2–1	(Russia) Krasnodar
Bosetti 64' (pen.); Le Marchand 77'	Report	Smolov 52'

Allianz Riviera, Nice
Attendance: 12,722
Referee: Sandro Schärer (Switzerland)

=== Group J ===
Pos	Team	Pld	W	D	L	GF	GA	GD	Pts	Qualification	FIO	PAOK	QRB	LIB
1	(Italy) Fiorentina	6	4	1	1	15	6	+9	13	Advance to knockout phase	—	2–3	5–1	3–0
2	(Greece) PAOK	6	3	1	2	7	6	+1	10	Advance to knockout phase	0–0	—	0–1	2–0
3	(Azerbaijan) Qarabağ	6	2	1	3	7	12	−5	7		1–2	2–0	—	2–2
4	(Czech Republic) Slovan Liberec	6	1	1	4	7	12	−5	4		1–3	1–2	3–0	—

Source: UEFA
Rules for classification: Group stage tiebreakers
15 September 2016
17:00

Qarabağ (Azerbaijan)	2–2	(Czech Republic) Slovan Liberec
Míchel 7'; Sadygov 90+4'	Report	Sýkora 1'; Baroš 68'

Dalga Arena, Baku (Note: Qarabağ played their home matches at Dalga Arena, Baku, and Tofiq Bahramov Republican Stadium, Baku, instead of their regular stadium Azersun Arena, Baku.)
Attendance: 6,200
Referee: Stephan Klossner (Switzerland)
15 September 2016
21:05

PAOK (Greece)	0–0	(Italy) Fiorentina
	Report

Toumba Stadium, Thessaloniki
Attendance: 20,904
Referee: Slavko Vinčić (Slovenia)

29 September 2016
19:00

Fiorentina (Italy)	5–1	(Azerbaijan) Qarabağ
Babacar 39', 45+2'; Kalinić 43'; Zárate 63', 78'	Report	Ndlovu 90+2'

Stadio Artemio Franchi, Florence
Attendance: 14,145
Referee: Oliver Drachta (Austria)
29 September 2016
19:00

Slovan Liberec (Czech Republic)	1–2	(Greece) PAOK
Komlichenko 1'	Report	Athanasiadis 10' (pen.), 82'

Stadion u Nisy, Liberec
Attendance: 8,880
Referee: Tamás Bognár (Hungary)

20 October 2016
19:00

Slovan Liberec (Czech Republic)	1–3	(Italy) Fiorentina
Ševčík 58'	Report	Kalinić 8', 23'; Babacar 70'

Stadion u Nisy, Liberec
Attendance: 9,037
Referee: Serdar Gözübüyük (Netherlands)
20 October 2016
19:00

Qarabağ (Azerbaijan)	2–0	(Greece) PAOK
Quintana 56'; Amirguliyev 87'	Report

Tofiq Bahramov Republican Stadium, Baku
Attendance: 26,784
Referee: Alon Yefet (Israel)

3 November 2016
21:05

Fiorentina (Italy)	3–0	(Czech Republic) Slovan Liberec
Iličić 30' (pen.); Kalinić 43'; Cristóforo 73'	Report

Stadio Artemio Franchi, Florence
Attendance: 11,583
Referee: Aleksandar Stavrev (Macedonia)
3 November 2016
21:05

PAOK (Greece)	0–1	(Azerbaijan) Qarabağ
	Report	Míchel 69'

Toumba Stadium, Thessaloniki
Attendance: 11,476
Referee: John Beaton (Scotland)

24 November 2016
19:00

Slovan Liberec (Czech Republic)	3–0	(Azerbaijan) Qarabağ
Vůch 11'; Komlichenko 57' (pen.), 63'	Report

Stadion u Nisy, Liberec
Attendance: 4,942
Referee: Stefan Johannesson (Sweden)
24 November 2016
19:00

Fiorentina (Italy)	2–3	(Greece) PAOK
Bernardeschi 33'; Babacar 50'	Report	Shakhov 5'; Djalma 26'; Rodrigues 90+3'

Stadio Artemio Franchi, Florence
Attendance: 12,793
Referee: Stephan Klossner (Switzerland)

8 December 2016
17:00

Qarabağ (Azerbaijan)	1–2	(Italy) Fiorentina
Reynaldo 73'	Report	Vecino 60'; Chiesa 76'

Tofiq Bahramov Republican Stadium, Baku
Attendance: 21,750
Referee: Ivan Bebek (Croatia)
8 December 2016
17:00

PAOK (Greece)	2–0	(Czech Republic) Slovan Liberec
Rodrigues 29'; Pelkas 67'	Report

Toumba Stadium, Thessaloniki
Attendance: 11,463
Referee: Andre Marriner (England)

=== Group K ===
Pos	Team	Pld	W	D	L	GF	GA	GD	Pts	Qualification	SPP	HBS	SOU	INT
1	(Czech Republic) Sparta Prague	6	4	0	2	8	6	+2	12	Advance to knockout phase	—	2–0	1–0	3–1
2	(Israel) Hapoel Be'er Sheva	6	2	2	2	6	6	0	8	Advance to knockout phase	0–1	—	0–0	3–2
3	(England) Southampton	6	2	2	2	6	4	+2	8		3–0	1–1	—	2–1
4	(Italy) Internazionale	6	2	0	4	7	11	−4	6		2–1	0–2	1–0	—

Source: UEFA
Rules for classification: Group stage tiebreakers
15 September 2016
21:05

Internazionale (Italy)	0–2	(Israel) Hapoel Be'er Sheva
	Report	Vítor 54'; Buzaglo 69'

San Siro, Milan
Attendance: 16,778
Referee: Jakob Kehlet (Denmark)
15 September 2016
21:05

Southampton (England)	3–0	(Czech Republic) Sparta Prague
Austin 5' (pen.), 27'; Rodriguez 90+2'	Report

St Mary's Stadium, Southampton
Attendance: 25,125
Referee: Manuel Gräfe (Germany)

29 September 2016
19:00

Sparta Prague (Czech Republic)	3–1	(Italy) Internazionale
V. Kadlec 7', 25'; Holek 76'	Report	Palacio 71'

Generali Arena, Prague
Attendance: 14,651
Referee: Artur Soares Dias (Portugal)
29 September 2016
19:00

Hapoel Be'er Sheva (Israel)	0–0	(England) Southampton
	Report

Turner Stadium, Be'er Sheva
Attendance: 16,138
Referee: Stefan Johannesson (Sweden)

20 October 2016
19:00

Hapoel Be'er Sheva (Israel)	0–1	(Czech Republic) Sparta Prague
	Report	Pulkrab 71'

Turner Stadium, Be'er Sheva
Attendance: 15,607
Referee: Ivan Bebek (Croatia)
20 October 2016
19:00

Internazionale (Italy)	1–0	(England) Southampton
Candreva 67'	Report

San Siro, Milan
Attendance: 26,719
Referee: Gediminas Mažeika (Lithuania)

3 November 2016
21:05

Sparta Prague (Czech Republic)	2–0	(Israel) Hapoel Be'er Sheva
B. Bitton 23' (o.g.); Lafata 38'	Report

Generali Arena, Prague
Attendance: 12,891
Referee: István Vad (Hungary)
3 November 2016
21:05

Southampton (England)	2–1	(Italy) Internazionale
Van Dijk 64'; Nagatomo 70' (o.g.)	Report	Icardi 33'

St Mary's Stadium, Southampton
Attendance: 30,389
Referee: Paweł Gil (Poland)

24 November 2016
19:00

Hapoel Be'er Sheva (Israel)	3–2	(Italy) Internazionale
Maranhão 58'; Nwakaeme 71' (pen.); Sahar 90+3'	Report	Icardi 13'; Brozović 25'

Turner Stadium, Be'er Sheva
Attendance: 15,973
Referee: Xavier Estrada Fernández (Spain)
24 November 2016
19:00

Sparta Prague (Czech Republic)	1–0	(England) Southampton
Costa 11'	Report

Generali Arena, Prague
Attendance: 17,429
Referee: Jesús Gil Manzano (Spain)

8 December 2016
21:05

Internazionale (Italy)	2–1	(Czech Republic) Sparta Prague
Éder 23', 90'	Report	Mareček 54'

San Siro, Milan
Attendance: 6,449
Referee: Bart Vertenten (Belgium)
8 December 2016
21:05

Southampton (England)	1–1	(Israel) Hapoel Be'er Sheva
Van Dijk 90+1'	Report	Buzaglo 79'

St Mary's Stadium, Southampton
Attendance: 30,416
Referee: Paolo Tagliavento (Italy)

=== Group L ===
Pos	Team	Pld	W	D	L	GF	GA	GD	Pts	Qualification	OSM	VIL	ZUR	STE
1	(Turkey) Osmanlıspor	6	3	1	2	10	7	+3	10	Advance to knockout phase	—	2–2	2–0	2–0
2	(Spain) Villarreal	6	2	3	1	9	8	+1	9	Advance to knockout phase	1–2	—	2–1	2–1
3	(Switzerland) Zürich	6	1	3	2	5	7	−2	6		2–1	1–1	—	0–0
4	(Romania) Steaua București	6	1	3	2	5	7	−2	6		2–1	1–1	1–1	—

Source: UEFA
Rules for classification: Group stage tiebreakers
15 September 2016
21:05

Osmanlıspor (Turkey)	2–0	(Romania) Steaua București
Diabaté 64' (pen.); Umar 74'	Report

Osmanlı Stadyumu, Ankara
Attendance: 11,807
Referee: Tobias Welz (Germany)
15 September 2016
21:05

Villarreal (Spain)	2–1	(Switzerland) Zürich
Pato 28'; Jonathan 45+1'	Report	Sadiku 2'

El Madrigal, Villarreal
Attendance: 16,384
Referee: Sébastien Delferière (Belgium)

29 September 2016
19:00

Zürich (Switzerland)	2–1	(Turkey) Osmanlıspor
Schönbächler 45+1'; Čavušević 79'	Report	Maher 73'

Letzigrund, Zürich
Attendance: 7,473
Referee: Aleksei Eskov (Russia)
29 September 2016
19:00

Steaua București (Romania)	1–1	(Spain) Villarreal
Sulley 19'	Report	Borré 9'

Arena Națională, Bucharest
Attendance: 13,231
Referee: Ievgenii Aranovskyi (Ukraine)

20 October 2016
19:00

Steaua București (Romania)	1–1	(Switzerland) Zürich
Golubović 63'	Report	Koné 86'

Arena Națională, Bucharest
Attendance: 13,154
Referee: Tamás Bognár (Hungary)
20 October 2016
19:00

Osmanlıspor (Turkey)	2–2	(Spain) Villarreal
Rusescu 23', 24'	Report	N'Diaye 56'; Pato 74'

Osmanlı Stadyumu, Ankara
Attendance: 11,692
Referee: Liran Liany (Israel)

3 November 2016
21:05

Zürich (Switzerland)	0–0	(Romania) Steaua București
	Report

Letzigrund, Zürich
Attendance: 8,060
Referee: Robert Schörgenhofer (Austria)
3 November 2016
21:05

Villarreal (Spain)	1–2	(Turkey) Osmanlıspor
Rodri 48'	Report	Webó 8'; Rusescu 75'

El Madrigal, Villarreal
Attendance: 15,386
Referee: Harald Lechner (Austria)

24 November 2016
19:00

Steaua București (Romania)	2–1	(Turkey) Osmanlıspor
Momčilović 68'; Tamaș 86'	Report	Ndiaye 30'

Arena Națională, Bucharest
Attendance: 6,020
Referee: Paolo Mazzoleni (Italy)
24 November 2016
19:00

Zürich (Switzerland)	1–1	(Spain) Villarreal
Rodríguez 87' (pen.)	Report	Soriano 14'

Letzigrund, Zürich
Attendance: 10,069
Referee: Davide Massa (Italy)

8 December 2016
17:00

Osmanlıspor (Turkey)	2–0	(Switzerland) Zürich
Delarge 73'; Kılıçaslan 89'	Report

Osmanlı Stadyumu, Ankara
Attendance: 10,250
Referee: Matej Jug (Slovenia)
8 December 2016
17:00

Villarreal (Spain)	2–1	(Romania) Steaua București
Sansone 16'; Trigueros 88'	Report	Achim 55'

El Madrigal, Villarreal
Attendance: 19,471
Referee: Manuel Gräfe (Germany)
