= Hen Reuven =

Israeli footballer

Hen Reuven חן ראובן
Personal information
- Full name: Hen Reuven
- Date of birth: January 29, 1992 (age 34)
- Place of birth: Hadera, Israel
- Position: Left back

Team information
- Current team: Beitar Pardes Hanna

Youth career
- 2006–2008: Beitar Tubruk
- 2008–2012: Maccabi Netanya

Senior career*
Years	Team	Apps	(Gls)
2011–2013	Maccabi Netanya	10	(1)
2012–2013	→ Sektzia Ness Ziona (loan)	20	(0)
2013–2016	Hapoel Herzliya	85	(20)
2016–2019	Hapoel Bnei Lod	76	(10)
2019	Nordia Jerusalem	7	(0)
2019–2020	Hapoel Ashdod	8	(1)
2020–2021	Hapoel Baqa al-Gharbiyye	32	(10)
2021–2022	Maccabi Herzliya	11	(1)
2022	Ahva Reineh	0	(0)
2022	Hapoel Migdal HaEmek	0	(0)
2024–	Beitar Pardes Hanna	14	(10)
- * Club domestic league appearances and goals as of 1 June 2024

Hen Reuven (Hebrew: חן ראובן) is an Israeli footballer currently playing for Beitar Pardes Hanna.
