= FC Zbrojovka Brno (women) =

Brno
- Full name: FC Zbrojovka Brno
- Nickname(s): Zbrojovačky
- Founded: 2006
- Dissolved: 2018 (merged with SK Líšeň)
- Ground: Brněnské Ivanovice
- Manager: Michal Odehnal
- League: Second Division
- 2017-18: 5th
- Website: http://www.fczbrno.eu
Home colours

FC Zbrojovka Brno was a Czech women's football team from Brno, representing FC Zbrojovka Brno in the Czech Second Division. It was founded in 2006. Since its establishment, the club's best finish in the First Division is fourth, which it achieved in 2007–08 and 2009–10.

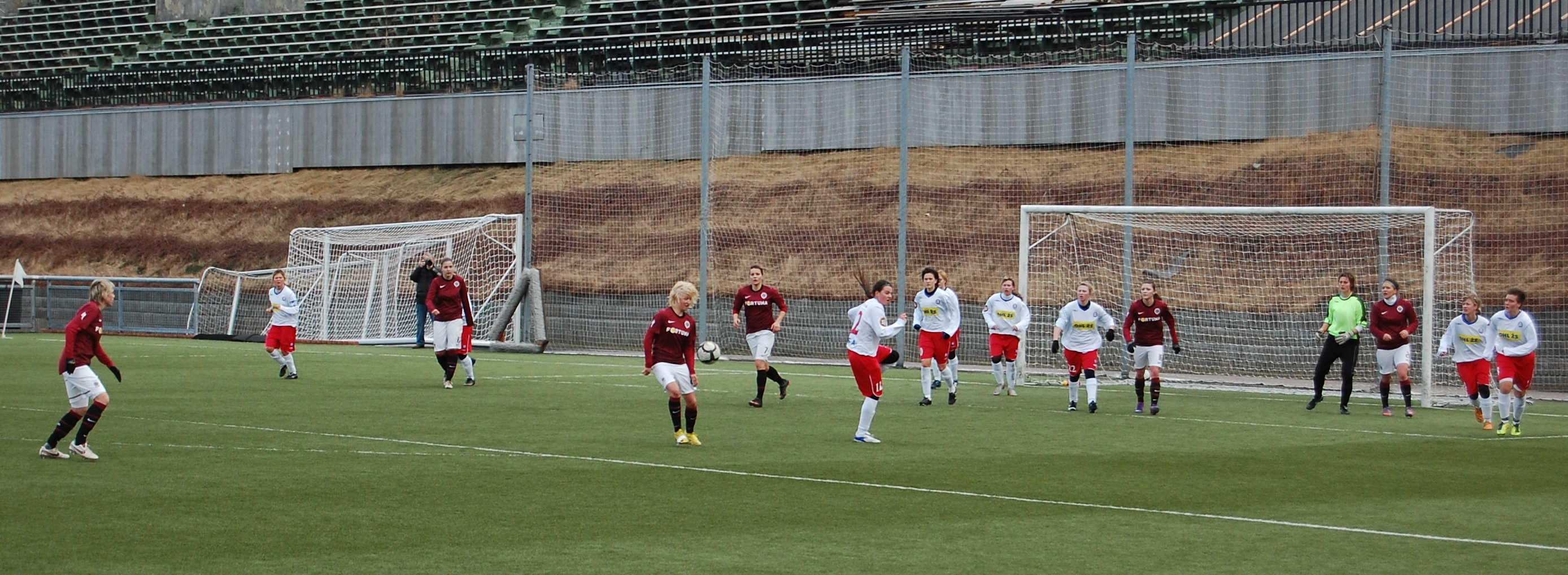
Brno (in white shirts) against Sparta

== Honours ==
In the Czech Republic

- Moravian Football League (2): 2013–14, 2014–15

== Previous seasons ==
In the 2012-13 season, team relegated into the Moravian Football League. In the 2016-17 season, team promoted back into the Czech First Division due to FK Bohemians Prague not signed to the Czech First Division.

- 2006–2013 Czech First Division
- 2013–2015 Moravian Football League
- 2015–2016 Czech Second Division
- 2016–2017 Czech First Division
- 2017–2018 Czech Second Division

== Last squad ==
As of 13 February 2012

Note: Flags indicate national team as defined under FIFA eligibility rules; some limited exceptions apply. Players may hold more than one non-FIFA nationality.

No.	Pos.	Nation	Player
—	GK	(Czech Republic) CZE	Kristýna Hádlíková
—	GK	(Czech Republic) CZE	Kristýna Rusňáková
—	DF	(Czech Republic) CZE	Eva Juříková
—	DF	(Czech Republic) CZE	Iveta Tanenbergerová
—	DF	(Czech Republic) CZE	Jitka Remešová
—	DF	(Czech Republic) CZE	Marcela Žampová
—	DF	(Czech Republic) CZE	Vendula Tomšíková
—	MF	(Czech Republic) CZE	Kateřina Junáková
—	MF	(Czech Republic) CZE	Kateřina Vejlupková
—	MF	(Czech Republic) CZE	Lenka Černá
—	MF	(Czech Republic) CZE	Leona Klíčová

No.	Pos.	Nation	Player
—	MF	(Czech Republic) CZE	Martina Koláčková (captain)
—	MF	(Czech Republic) CZE	Pavlína Válková
—	MF	(Czech Republic) CZE	Tereza Bezděková
—	FW	(Czech Republic) CZE	Aneta Pospíšilová
—	FW	(Czech Republic) CZE	Jana Soušková
—	FW	(Czech Republic) CZE	Kristýna Burešová
—	FW	(Czech Republic) CZE	Kristýna Vodičková
—	FW	(Czech Republic) CZE	Lucie Florková
—	FW	(Czech Republic) CZE	Monika Šilhárová
—	FW	(Czech Republic) CZE	Petra Čechová
