= Robert Schörgenhofer =

Austrian football referee

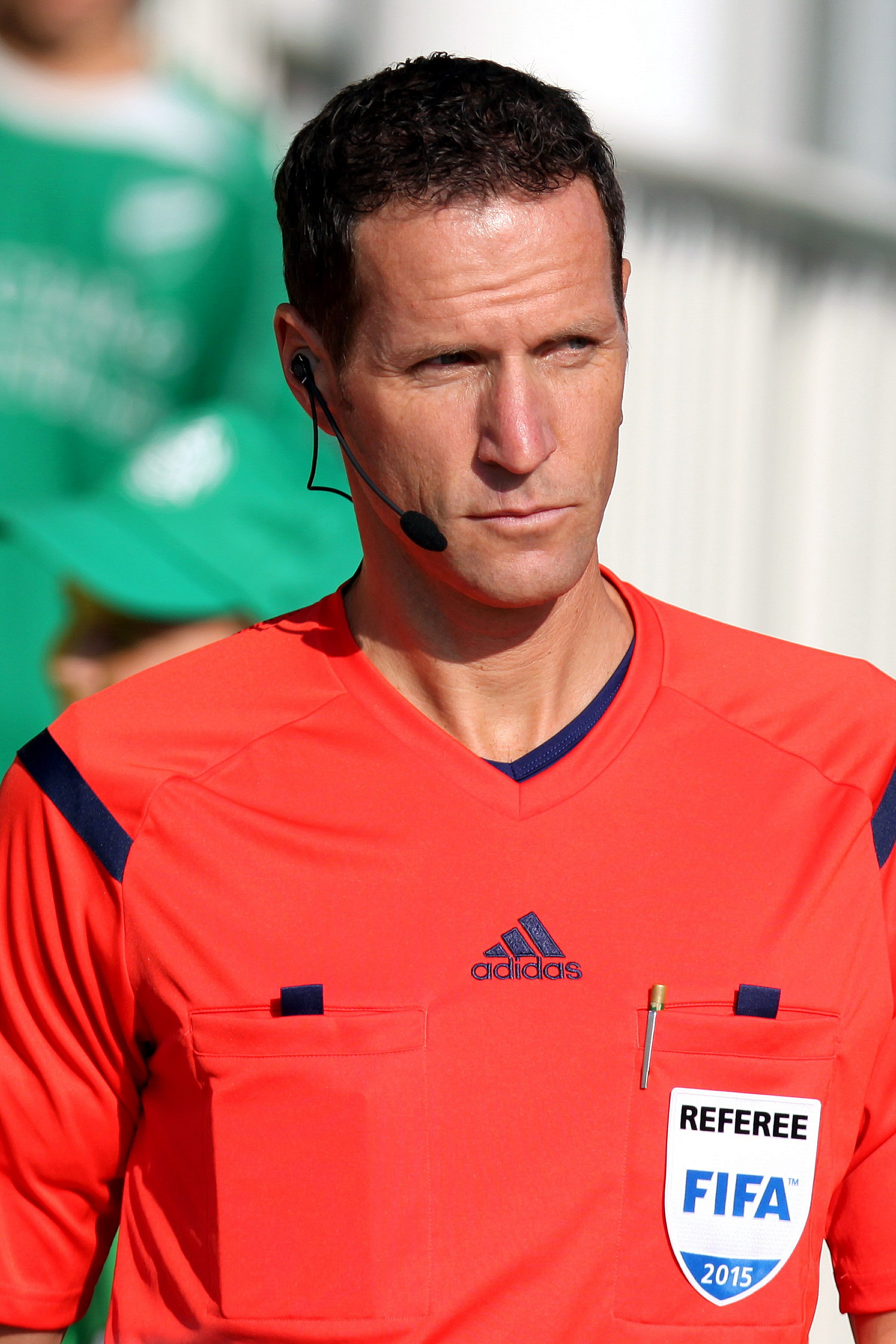
Robert Schörgenhofer in 2015

Robert Schörgenhofer (born 12 February 1973 in Vorarlberg) is an Austrian football referee. He refereed at the 2012–13 UEFA Europa League.

Schörgenhofer became a FIFA referee in 2007. He has officiated at the 2011 FIFA U-20 World Cup and qualifying matches for the 2010, 2014 and 2018 World Cups.
