= Oscar Scarione =

Argentine footballer

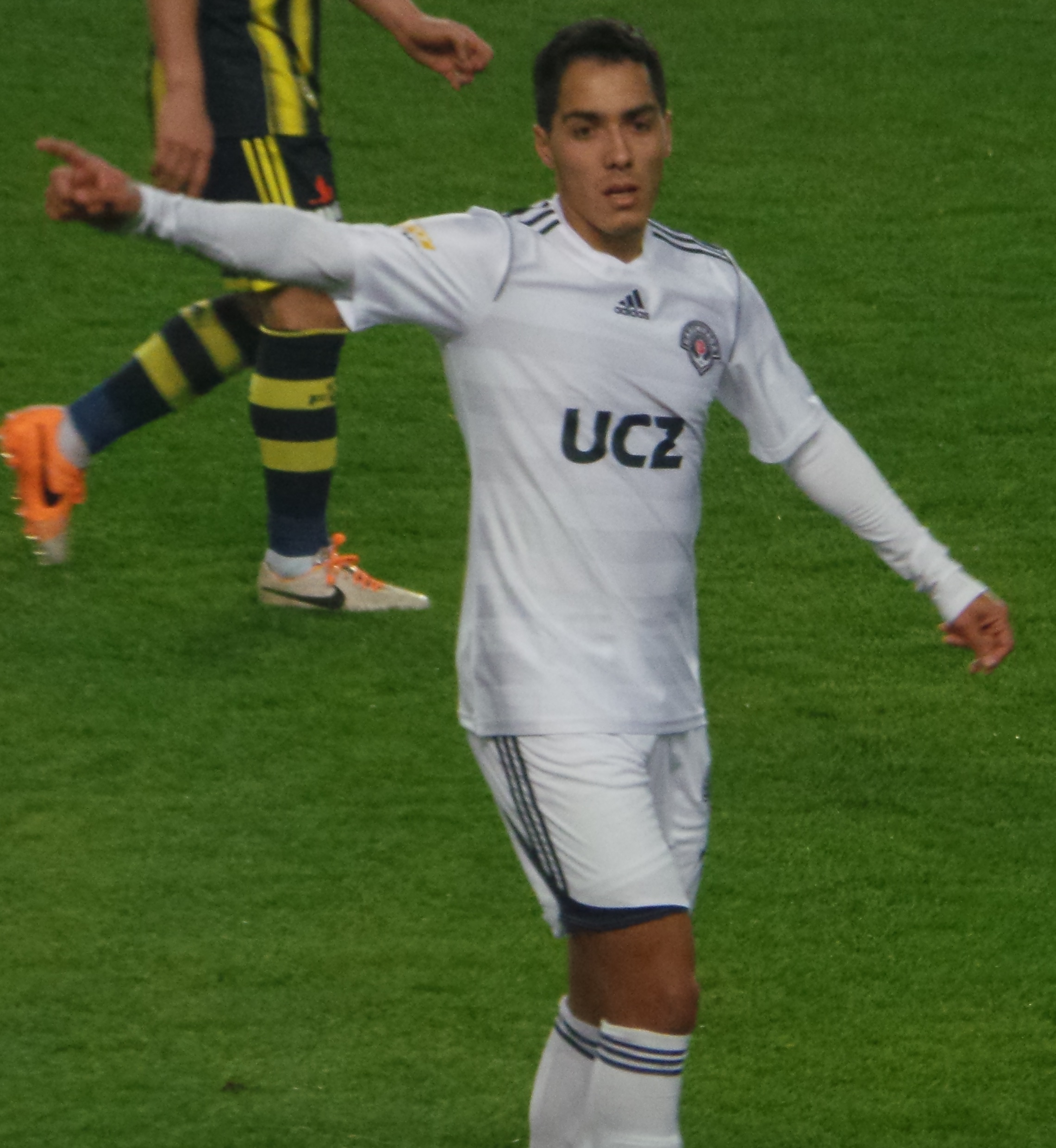

Personal information
- Full name: Ezequiel Oscar Scarione
- Date of birth: 14 July 1985 (age 41)
- Place of birth: José Clemente Paz, Argentina
- Height: 1.79 m (5 ft 10 in)
- Position: Midfielder

Youth career
- –2002: Boca Juniors

Senior career*
Years	Team	Apps	(Gls)
2002–2004	Boca Juniors	2	(0)
2004–2006	Deportivo Cuenca	23	(8)
2006–2011	Thun	115	(46)
2009	→ FC Luzern (loan)	18	(1)
2011–2013	St. Gallen	88	(42)
2013–2016	Kasımpaşa	94	(40)
2016–2017	Maccabi Tel Aviv	19	(5)
2017–2019	Göztepe	17	(2)
2019–2020	Ankaragücü	19	(4)

International career
2006	Argentina U-20	7	(3)
- * Club domestic league appearances and goals as of 25 July 2020

Ezequiel Oscar Scarione (born 14 July 1985) is an Argentine former professional footballer.

== Club career ==
Scarione began his career Boca Juniors and was promoted to the first team in 2002. In 2004 he transferred to Deportivo Cuenca. Scarione left Deportivo Cuenca in 2006 and moved to Switzerland-based club FC Thun where he played 42 games and scored 7 goals. On 8 January 2009, he joined FC Luzern on loan. In July 2009 he returned to Switzerland signing with St. Gallen to play in the 2009–10 season in the Swiss Challenge League, winning the Championship and achieving immediate promotion to the Swiss Super League for the 2010–11 season.

On 12 July 2016, Scarione signed for Maccabi Tel Aviv on a free transfer.

In July 2017, Scarione signed a contract with Göztepe in Turkey.

On 31 January 2019, Scarione joined Süper Lig side Ankaragücü on a four-month deal. He made his debut for Ankaragücü in a 3–0 home win against Kasımpaşa on 11 February 2019.

== International career ==
In 2006, Scarione played for the Argentina national under-20 football team.

== Honours ==
Individual

- Swiss Super League Top goalacorers: 2012–13
