= 2016–17 Videoton FC season =

Videoton
2016–17 season
- Owner: István Garancsi
- Manager: Henning Berg
- Stadium: Pancho Aréna (Note: Videoton continued to play their home matches at the Pancho Aréna in Felcsút, instead of their regular stadium, the Sóstói Stadion in Székesfehérvár, built in 1967 which was demolished to make way to the newly built Sóstói Stadion.) (Temporary stadium)
- Nemzeti Bajnokság I: 2nd
- Magyar Kupa: Round of 32
- UEFA Europa League: Third qualifying round
- Top goalscorer: League: Marko Šćepović (13); All: Marko Šćepović (16)
- Highest home attendance: 3,208 v Ferencváros (20 May 2017, Nemzeti Bajnokság I)
- Lowest home attendance: 1,423 v Debrecen (21 August 2016, Nemzeti Bajnokság I)
- Average home league attendance: 2,073
- Biggest win: 6–1 v Makó (Away, 26 October 2016, Magyar Kupa )
- Biggest defeat: 0–2 v Zaria Bălți (Away, 7 July 2016, UEFA Europa League); 0–2 v Diósgyőr (Away, 15 October 2016, Nemzeti Bajnokság I)

The 2016–17 season was Videoton Football Club's 48th competitive season, 17th consecutive season in the Nemzeti Bajnokság I and 74th season in existence as a football club. In addition to the domestic league, Videoton participated in that season's editions of the Magyar Kupa and the UEFA Europa League.

== Squad ==
Squad at end of season

Note: Flags indicate national team as defined under FIFA eligibility rules; some limited exceptions apply. Players may hold more than one non-FIFA nationality.

No.	Pos.	Nation	Player
1	GK	HUN	Tamás Horváth
3	DF	BRA	Paulo Vinícius
5	DF	HUN	Attila Fiola
6	DF	HUN	András Fejes
7	FW	SRB	Danko Lazović
8	MF	HUN	Zsolt Pölöskei
9	FW	CRO	Mirko Marić
10	MF	HUN	István Kovács
11	DF	FRA	Loïc Négo
13	GK	HUN	Illés Zöldesi
14	MF	HUN	Zsombor Bévárdi
17	MF	HUN	Máté Pátkai
22	DF	CPV	Stopira

No.	Pos.	Nation	Player
23	DF	HUN	Roland Juhász
25	MF	HUN	Patrik Schiller
27	MF	HUN	Ádám Bódi
30	DF	HUN	Roland Szolnoki
31	MF	HUN	Dávid Barczi
33	MF	HUN	József Varga
44	FW	SRB	Marko Šćepović
49	MF	HUN	Krisztián Géresi
74	GK	HUN	Ádám Kovácsik
75	DF	HUN	Bence Varga
88	MF	BIH	Anel Hadžić
99	MF	BIH	Asmir Suljić

== Transfers ==
=== Transfers in ===
Transfer window	Pos.	No.	Player	From
Summer	DF	–	(Hungary) Dénes Baksa	(Hungary) Puskás Akadémia
Summer	DF	5	(Hungary) Attila Fiola	(Hungary) Puskás Akadémia
Summer	FW	7	(Serbia) Danko Lazović	Free agent (Note: Previous club Olimpija Ljubljana.)
Summer	GK	13	(Hungary) Illés Zöldesi	(Hungary) Diósgyőr
Summer	MF	14	(Hungary) Zsombor Bévárdi	(Hungary) Puskás Akadémia
Summer	MF	27	(Hungary) Ádám Bódi	(Hungary) Debrecen
Summer	MF	31	(Hungary) Dávid Barczi	(Hungary) Diósgyőr
Summer	MF	33	(Hungary) József Varga	(Hungary) Debrecen
Summer	MF	39	(Hungary) András Lénárt	(Hungary) Győr
Summer	FW	44	(Serbia) Marko Šćepović	(Greece) Olympiacos
Summer	DF	75	(Hungary) Bence Varga	Youth team
Summer	MF	88	(Bosnia and Herzegovina) Anel Hadžić	Free agent (Note: Previous club Eskişehirspor.)
Winter	FW	9	(Croatia) Mirko Marić	(Croatia) Dinamo Zagreb

=== Transfers out ===
Transfer window	Pos.	No.	Player	To
Summer	FW	–	(Hungary) Patrik Paudits	(Hungary) Csákvár
Summer	GK	–	(Slovakia) Tomáš Tujvel	(Hungary) Mezőkövesd
Summer	MF	–	(Hungary) Donát Zsótér	(Belgium) Sint-Truidense
Summer	GK	1	(Serbia) Filip Pajović	Released
Summer	MF	5	(Hungary) Tibor Heffler	(Hungary) Puskás Akadémia
Summer	MF	11	(Hungary) Tamás Koltai	(Hungary) Paks
Summer	FW	14	(Hungary) Gergely Rudolf	Released (Note: Joined Nyíregyháza.)
Summer	DF	18	(Hungary) Ádám Lang	(France) Dijon
Summer	MF	33	(Croatia) Dinko Trebotić	Released (Note: Joined Bnei Yehuda.)
Summer	GK	42	(Hungary) Péter Gábor	(Hungary) Pécs
Summer	FW	88	(Hungary) Zsolt Haraszti	(Hungary) Paks
Winter	FW	9	(Hungary) Róbert Feczesin	(South Korea) Jeonnam Dragons
Winter	MF	16	(Portugal) Filipe Oliveira	Released (Note: Joined Anorthosis Famagusta.)

=== Loans in ===
Transfer window	Pos.	No.	Player	From	End date
Summer	FW	–	(Croatia) Ante Solomun	(Croatia) Lučko	End of season

=== Loans out ===
Transfer window	Pos.	No.	Player	To	End date
Summer	DF	95	(Hungary) Márton Lorentz	(Hungary) Soroksár	End of season
Winter	MF	15	(Hungary) Viktor Sejben	(Hungary) Csákvár	End of season
Winter	MF	46	(Hungary) Ádám Simon	(Hungary) Gyirmót	End of season

== Competitions ==
=== Overview ===
Competition	First match	Last match	Starting round	Final position	Record							
Competition	First match	Last match	Starting round	Final position	Pld	W	D	L	GF	GA	GD	Win %
Nemzeti Bajnokság I	17 July 2016	27 May 2017	Matchday 1	2nd	33	18	8	7	65	28	+37	54.55
Magyar Kupa	14 September 2016	30 November 2016	Round of 128	Round of 32	3	2	0	1	11	3	+8	66.67
UEFA Europa League	30 June 2016	4 August 2016	First qualifying round	Third qualifying round	6	2	2	2	7	5	+2	33.33
Total					42	22	10	10	83	36	+47	52.38

Source: Competitions

=== Nemzeti Bajnokság I ===
==== League table ====
Pos	Team	Pld	W	D	L	GF	GA	GD	Pts	Qualification or relegation
1	Honvéd (C)	33	20	5	8	55	30	+25	65	Qualification for the Champions League second qualifying round
2	Videoton	33	18	8	7	65	28	+37	62	Qualification for the Europa League first qualifying round (Note: Ferencváros qualified for the Europa League first qualifying round by winning the 2016–17 Magyar Kupa.)
3	Vasas	33	15	7	11	50	40	+10	52	Qualification for the Europa League first qualifying round
4	Ferencváros	33	14	10	9	54	44	+10	52	Qualification for the Europa League first qualifying round
5	Paks	33	11	12	10	41	37	+4	45	

Source: Hungarian Football Federation (in Hungarian), Soccerway
Rules for classification: 1) Points; 2) Matches won; 3) Goal difference; 4) Goals scored; 5) Head-to-head points; 6) Head-to-head goal difference; 7) Head-to-head away goals scored; 8) Fairplay; 9) Draw.
(C) Champions

==== Results summary ====
Overall								Home						Away					
Pld	W	D	L	GF	GA	GD	Pts	W	D	L	GF	GA	GD	W	D	L	GF	GA	GD
33	18	8	7	65	28	+37	62	12	2	3	45	14	+31	6	6	4	20	14	+6

Source: Hungarian Football Federation

==== Results by round ====
Round	1	2	3	4	5	6	7	8	9	10	11	12	13	14	15	16	17	18	19	20	21	22	23	24	25	26	27	28	29	30	31	32	33
Ground	H	A	H	A	H	A	H	H	A	H	A	A	H	A	H	A	H	A	A	H	A	H	H	A	H	A	H	A	H	H	A	H	A
Result	L	D	L	W	W	L	W	W	W	D	W	L	W	D	W	L	W	W	D	W	D	W	W	D	L	W	D	D	W	W	W	W	L
Position	9	8	11	9	7	7	6	4	4	4	2	3	2	3	2	2	2	2	1	1	2	1	1	1	2	1	2	2	2	2	2	2	2
Points	0	1	1	4	7	7	10	13	16	17	20	20	23	24	27	27	30	33	34	37	38	41	44	45	45	48	49	50	53	56	59	62	62

Source: Matches
A = Away; H = Home; W = Win; D = Draw; L = Loss

==== Matches ====
17 July 2016 1	Videoton	1–2	Diósgyőr	Felcsút
18:00 CEST (UTC+2)	Feczesin 2'; Suljić (yellow card) 42'; Juhász (yellow card) 62'; Pátkai (yellow card) 73'	Report	Bognár 17', 39'; Ternován (yellow card) 43'; Nikházi (yellow card) 56'; Lázár (red card) 80'; Daushvili (yellow card) 82'	Stadium: Pancho Aréna; Attendance: 2,069; Referee: Sándor Andó-Szabó; Assistant referees: Georgiou Theodoros, Péter Kóbor; Fourth official: Balázs Huszár; Goal-line assistants: Csaba Pintér, Katalin Kulcsár

24 July 2016 2	Paks	1–1	Videoton	Paks
18:00 CEST (UTC+2)	Szabó (yellow card) 11'; Gévay 52', (yellow card) 55'	Report	Feczesin 26', (yellow card) 55'; Pátkai (yellow card) 30'; Négo (yellow card) 31'	Stadium: Fehérvári úti Stadion; Attendance: 2,136; Referee: Ferenc Karakó; Assistant referees: Oszkár Lémon, Balázs Buzás; Fourth official: Gábor Kormányos II; Goal-line assistants: Zoltán Iványi, János Takács

31 July 2016 3	Videoton	1–2	Vasas	Felcsút
18:00 CEST (UTC+2)	Szolnoki (yellow card) 25'; Simon (yellow card) 53'; Vinícius (yellow card) 72', (goal) 90+4'	Report	Debreceni (yellow card) 16'; Szivacski (yellow card) 31'; Korcsmár (yellow card) 56', (goal) 70'; Berecz (yellow card) 76'; Pavlov 81'	Stadium: Pancho Aréna; Attendance: 1,901; Referee: Viktor Kassai; Assistant referees: György Ring, Dr. Zsolt Varga; Fourth official: Tamás Márkus; Goal-line assistants: Balázs Berke, Gyöngyi Gaál

7 August 2016 4	Gyirmót	0–4	Videoton	Győr
18:00 CEST (UTC+2)	Völgyi (yellow card) 62'	Report	Suljić (yellow card) 32'; Juhász 47'; Lazović 59'; Pátkai 75'; Feczesin 89'	Stadium: Ménfői úti Stadion; Attendance: 2,000; Referee: Ferenc Karakó; Assistant referees: Georgiou Theodoros, Balázs Huszár; Fourth official: Péter Kóbor; Goal-line assistants: Péter Solymosi, János Takács

13 August 2016 5	Videoton	2–0	Mezőkövesd	Felcsút
18:00 CEST (UTC+2)	Suljić (yellow card) 3'; Pátkai 9'; Lazović 13'	Report	Vošahlík (yellow card) 4'; Pauljević (yellow card) 67'	Stadium: Pancho Aréna; Attendance: 1,539; Referee: Zsolt Szabó; Assistant referees: Vencel Tóth II, Balázs Farkas; Fourth official: Georgiou Theodoros; Goal-line assistants: István Vad, Gyöngyi Gaál

16 August 2016 6	MTK	1–0	Videoton	Dunaújváros (Note: The match was played at the Dunaújvárosi Stadion in Dunaújváros, instead of MTK regular stadium, the Hidegkuti Nándor Stadion in Budapest, built in 1947 which was demolished to make way to the newly built Hidegkuti Nándor Stadion.)
18:00 CEST (UTC+2)	Borbély (yellow card) 31'; Vadnai (yellow card) 38'; Torghelle (yellow card) 59', (goal) 64'; Poór (yellow card) 90'	Report	Pátkai (yellow card) 18'; Suljić (yellow card) 83'	Stadium: Dunaújvárosi Stadion; Attendance: 704; Referee: Csaba Pintér; Assistant referees: Balázs Huszár, Balázs Szalai; Fourth official: Arnold Kepe; Goal-line assistants: Attila Molnár, Katalin Kulcsár

21 August 2016 7	Videoton	5–1	Debrecen	Felcsút
20:00 CEST (UTC+2)	Lang 23', 57'; Géresi 33'; Feczesin 73', 90+2'	Report	Varga (yellow card) 7'; Ferenczi 14'	Stadium: Pancho Aréna; Attendance: 1,423; Referee: Zoltán Iványi; Assistant referees: Balázs Buzás, János Medovarszki; Fourth official: Dániel Szalai; Goal-line assistants: Balázs Berke, Attila Molnár

10 September 2016 8	Videoton	3–0	Haladás	Felcsút
18:00 CEST (UTC+2)	Stopira 51'; Feczesin 72'; Géresi 90'	Report	L. Kovács (yellow card) 55'; Halmosi (yellow card) 58'	Stadium: Pancho Aréna; Attendance: 2,183; Referee: Péter Solymosi; Assistant referees: Péter Berettyán, Oszkár Lémon; Fourth official: Zoltán Horváth; Goal-line assistants: Zsolt Szabó, Katalin Kulcsár

17 September 2016 9	Újpest	3–4	Videoton	Budapest (Note: The match was played at the Illovszky Rudolf Stadion in Budapest, instead of Újpest regular stadium, the Szusza Ferenc Stadion in Budapest, due to the renovation work.)
18:30 CEST (UTC+2)	Windecker 54'; Diarra 57', (yellow card) 72'; Bardhi 90+2'	Report	Lazović 21'; Géresi 29'; Stopira 45'; Négo (yellow card) 51'; Vinícius (yellow card) 65'; Pátkai 70'; Oliveira (yellow card) 71'	Stadium: Illovszky Rudolf Stadion; Attendance: 3,500; Referee: Zoltán Iványi; Assistant referees: István Albert, Gábor Erős; Fourth official: János Medovarszki; Goal-line assistants: János Takács, Eszter Urbán

21 September 2016 10	Videoton	1–1	Ferencváros	Felcsút
20:00 CEST (UTC+2)	Pátkai (yellow card) 2'; Šćepović 53'; J. Varga (yellow card) 82'	Report	Nagy (yellow card) 18'; Čukić (yellow card) 29'; Hajnal (yellow card) 42'; Lovrencsics (yellow card) 62'; Nalepa (yellow card) 65'; Djuricin 83'	Stadium: Pancho Aréna; Attendance: 3,112; Referee: Sándor Andó-Szabó; Assistant referees: Dr. Zsolt Varga, Tamás Márkus; Fourth official: Dániel Szalai; Goal-line assistants: Balázs Berke, Ádám Németh

24 September 2016 11	Honvéd	1–2	Videoton	Budapest
18:00 CEST (UTC+2)	Lanzafame 47', (yellow card) 66'; Baráth (yellow card) 75'	Report	Négo (yellow card) 13'; Juhász 35'; Géresi 52'; Stopira (yellow card) 81'	Stadium: Bozsik József Stadion; Attendance: 2,051; Referee: Balázs Berke; Assistant referees: Dr. Zsolt Varga, Balázs Buzás; Fourth official: Balázs Szert; Goal-line assistants: Ádám Farkas, Gyöngyi Gaál

15 October 2016 12	Diósgyőr	2–0	Videoton	Miskolc
18:00 CEST (UTC+2)	Novothny 73'; Lipták (yellow card) 77'; Elek 79'; Nikházi (yellow card) 79'	Report	Lazović (yellow card) 37'; Juhász (yellow card) 73'; Négo (yellow card) 77'; Varga (yellow card) 87'	Stadium: Diósgyőri Stadion; Attendance: 2,472; Referee: Viktor Kassai; Assistant referees: Vencel Tóth II, Dániel Szalai; Fourth official: Róbert Horváth; Goal-line assistants: Ferenc Karakó, Eszter Urbán

22 October 2016 13	Videoton	5–1	Paks	Felcsút
15:30 CEST (UTC+2)	Géresi 11'; Šćepović 24', 38'; Hadžić 48'; Négo (yellow card) 58'; Lazović 62'; Szolnoki (yellow card) 81'; Juhász (yellow card) 84'	Report	Hahn 4'; Szabó (red card) 43'; Kecskés (red card) 50'	Stadium: Pancho Aréna; Attendance: 1,446; Referee: Ádám Farkas; Assistant referees: Péter Berettyán, Attila Kelemen; Fourth official: Zoltán Horváth; Goal-line assistants: Tamás Bognár, Róbert Nagy

29 October 2016 14	Vasas	1–1	Videoton	Budapest
17:45 CEST (UTC+2)	Korcsmár (yellow card) 23'; Sağlık (yellow card) 34'; Remili 37'; Kleisz (yellow card) 52'; Ristevski (yellow card) 73'; Király (yellow card) 90+4'	Report	Szolnoki (yellow card) 11'; Fiola (yellow card) 24'; Stopira (yellow card) 79'; Lazović 90+2'; Hadžić (yellow card) 90+2'	Stadium: Illovszky Rudolf Stadion; Attendance: 5,045; Referee: Zoltán Iványi; Assistant referees: Róbert Horváth, Gábor Kormányos II; Fourth official: János Medovarszki; Goal-line assistants: Péter Solymosi, János Takács

5 November 2016 15	Videoton	4–0	Gyirmót	Felcsút
15:30 CET (UTC+1)	Feczesin 3', 34'; Šćepović 16', 59'	Report		Stadium: Pancho Aréna; Attendance: 1,461; Referee: Sándor Andó-Szabó; Assistant referees: Balázs Huszár, Péter Kóbor; Fourth official: Georgiou Theodoros; Goal-line assistants: Tamás Bognár, Tibor Gyarmati II

19 November 2016 16	Mezőkövesd	2–1	Videoton	Mezőkövesd
15:30 CET (UTC+1)	Kink 9'; Szeles (yellow card) 18'; Střeštík 86'	Report	Lazović (yellow card) 17'; Šćepović 27'; Pátkai (yellow card) 33'; Hadžić (yellow card) 41'; Négo (yellow card) 56'	Stadium: Városi Stadion; Attendance: 2,005; Referee: István Vad; Assistant referees: István Albert, Péter Berettyán; Fourth official: Balázs Farkas; Goal-line assistants: Szabolcs Szilasi, Gyöngyi Gaál

26 November 2016 17	Videoton	2–0	MTK	Felcsút
18:00 CET (UTC+1)	Hadžić (yellow card) 6'; Lazović (yellow card) 29', (goal) 70', 90'; Vinícius (yellow card) 45'; Juhász (yellow card) 67'; I. Kovács (yellow card) 79'	Report	Poór (yellow card) 16'; Vogyicska (yellow card) 31'; Ramos (yellow card) 43'	Stadium: Pancho Aréna; Attendance: 1,498; Referee: Ádám Farkas; Assistant referees: Vencel Tóth II, Balázs Szert; Fourth official: Tamás Márkus; Goal-line assistants: János Takács, Róbert Nagy

3 December 2016 18	Debrecen	0–1	Videoton	Debrecen
18:00 CET (UTC+1)	Jovanović (yellow card) 70'; Völgyi (yellow card) 75'	Report	Hadžić 61'	Stadium: Nagyerdei Stadion; Attendance: 1,814; Referee: József Erdős; Assistant referees: Tamás Márkus, Balázs Farkas; Fourth official: János Medovarszki; Goal-line assistants: Ferenc Karakó, Ádám Németh

10 December 2016 19	Haladás	1–1	Videoton	Sopron (Note: The match was played at the Káposztás utcai Stadion in Sopron, instead of Haladás regular stadium, the Rohonci út in Szombathely, which was demolished to make way to the newly built Haladás Sportkomplexum.)
15:30 CET (UTC+1)	Halmosi (yellow card) 30'; Gaál 57'; T. Kiss (yellow card) 60'; Hegedűs (yellow card) 76'; Jagodics (yellow card) 90'	Report	Šćepović 15', (yellow card) 83'; Stopira (yellow card) 56'; Hadžić (yellow card) 59'; Lazović (yellow card) 82'; Szolnoki (yellow card) 88'	Stadium: Káposztás utcai Stadion; Attendance: 1,410; Referee: István Vad; Assistant referees: Balázs Szalai, Zoltán Horváth; Fourth official: Oszkár Lémon; Goal-line assistants: Szabolcs Szilasi, Attila Molnár

18 February 2017 20	Videoton	5–1	Újpest	Felcsút
15:30 CET (UTC+1)	Hadžić 32'; Šćepović 58', 83'; Suljić 64'; Stopira 84'	Report	Perović 7'; Kálnoki-Kis (yellow card) 17'; Diarra (red card) 65'	Stadium: Pancho Aréna; Attendance: 2,179; Referee: Péter Solymosi; Assistant referees: Dr. Zsolt Varga, Tamás Márkus; Fourth official: Balázs Buzás; Goal-line assistants: Zoltán Iványi, Attila Molnár

25 February 2017 21	Ferencváros	0–0	Videoton	Budapest
18:00 CET (UTC+1)	Sternberg (yellow card) 33'; Botka (yellow card) 71'	Report	Varga (yellow card) 37'; Hadžić (yellow card) 55'	Stadium: Groupama Arena; Attendance: 8,725; Referee: Zsolt Szabó; Assistant referees: Péter Berettyán, Georgiou Theodoros; Fourth official: István Albert; Goal-line assistants: Zoltán Iványi, Tibor Gyarmati II

4 March 2017 22	Videoton	3–0	Honvéd	Felcsút
15:30 CET (UTC+1)	Lazović 38', 85'; Juhász (yellow card) 40'; Varga (yellow card) 67'; Šćepović 76', (yellow card) 79'	Report	Lovrić (red card) 61'; D. Bobál (yellow card) 75'; Kabangu (yellow card) 88'	Stadium: Pancho Aréna; Attendance: 2,749; Referee: Sándor Andó-Szabó; Assistant referees: Balázs Farkas, Balázs Szert; Fourth official: Gábor Varga Jr. Goal-line assistants: Zoltán Iványi, Ádám Németh

11 March 2017 23	Videoton	2–0	Diósgyőr	Felcsút
15:30 CET (UTC+1)	Vinícius 33'; Jagodinskis 36' (o.g.); Négo (yellow card) 74'	Report	Karan (yellow card) 10'; Novothny (yellow card) 58'; Szalóczy (yellow card) 76'	Stadium: Pancho Aréna; Attendance: 2,455; Referee: Balázs Berke; Assistant referees: György Ring, Georgiou Theodoros; Fourth official: Dániel Szalai; Goal-line assistants: Ferenc Karakó, Eszter Urbán

1 April 2017 24	Paks	0–0	Videoton	Paks
18:00 CEST (UTC+2)	Kulcsár (yellow card) 66'; Gévay (yellow card) 90'	Report		Stadium: Fehérvári úti Stadion; Attendance: 2,487; Referee: József Erdős; Assistant referees: Péter Kóbor, Róbert Horváth; Fourth official: Balázs Huszár; Goal-line assistants: Róbert Nagy, Péter Zierkelbach

8 April 2017 25	Videoton	1–2	Vasas	Felcsút
18:00 CEST (UTC+2)	Burmeister 45' (o.g.); Szolnoki (yellow card) 57'; Lazović (red card) 78'; Pátkai (yellow card) 80'	Report	Remili 6'; Ádám (yellow card) 27'; Ristevski (yellow card) 30'; Vaskó (yellow card) 68'; Hangya (red card) 78'; James (red card) 83'; Burmeister (yellow card) 87'; Murka 90+3'	Stadium: Pancho Aréna; Attendance: 2,469; Referee: Zsolt Szabó; Assistant referees: György Ring, Dr. Zsolt Varga; Fourth official: Tamás Márkus; Goal-line assistants: Péter Solymosi, Ádám Radványi

12 April 2017 26	Gyirmót	0–1	Videoton	Győr
18:00 CEST (UTC+2)	Bojović (yellow card) 34'; Radeljić (yellow card) 51'; Antonov (yellow card) 86'; Bori (red card) 90+2'	Report	Šćepović 35'	Stadium: Ménfői úti Stadion; Attendance: 965; Referee: Gergely Szőts; Assistant referees: Georgiou Theodoros, Róbert Horváth; Fourth official: Balázs Huszár; Goal-line assistants: Balázs Berke, Tibor Gyarmati II

15 April 2017 27	Videoton	1–1	Mezőkövesd	Felcsút
18:00 CEST (UTC+2)	Suljić 25'; Fiola (yellow card) 68'; Juhász (yellow card) 73'	Report	Hudák (yellow card) 7'; Molnár 27'; Gohér (yellow card) 59'; Bačelić-Grgić (yellow card) 73'; Tujvel (yellow card) 81'; Egerszegi (yellow card) 83'	Stadium: Pancho Aréna; Attendance: 1,651; Referee: Péter Solymosi; Assistant referees: István Albert, Balázs Buzás; Fourth official: Arnold Kepe; Goal-line assistants: Attila Molnár, Gyöngyi Gaál

22 April 2017 28	MTK	1–1	Videoton	Budapest
18:00 CEST (UTC+2)	Kolomoyets 9', (yellow card) 27'; Borbély (yellow card) 11'; Torghelle (yellow card) 46'; Kanta (yellow card) 47'; Grgić (yellow card) 78'; Petković (yellow card) 82'	Report	Marić 6'; Fiola (yellow card) 59'	Stadium: Hidegkuti Nándor Stadion; Attendance: 1,908; Referee: Csaba Pintér; Assistant referees: Georgiou Theodoros, Balázs Szert; Fourth official: Zoltán Horváth; Goal-line assistants: Ádám Németh, Ádám Radványi

29 April 2017 29	Videoton	3–2	Debrecen	Felcsút
20:30 CEST (UTC+2)	Mészáros 9' (o.g.); Šćepović 58'; Hadžić 81'	Report	Tőzsér (yellow card) 33'; Könyves 34'; Brković (yellow card) 70'; Handžić (yellow card) 83'	Stadium: Pancho Aréna; Attendance: 1,847; Referee: Tamás Bognár; Assistant referees: Péter Kóbor, Balázs Szalai; Fourth official: Krisztián Király; Goal-line assistants: József Erdős, Szabolcs Szilasi

6 May 2017 30	Videoton	2–0	Haladás	Felcsút
18:00 CEST (UTC+2)	Négo 16'; Géresi 86'	Report	Jagodics (yellow card) 62'	Stadium: Pancho Aréna; Attendance: 2,058; Referee: Péter Solymosi; Assistant referees: Balázs Farkas, Róbert Horváth; Fourth official: Oszkár Lémon; Goal-line assistants: János Takács, Eszter Urbán

13 May 2017 31	Újpest	0–3	Videoton	Budapest
20:30 CEST (UTC+2)	Diarra (red card) 28'; Kálnoki-Kis (yellow card) 31'; Windecker (yellow card) 59'	Report	Négo 14'; Stopira 16'; Šćepović 42'; Varga (yellow card) 77'	Stadium: Szusza Ferenc Stadion; Attendance: 2,160; Referee: Ferenc Karakó; Assistant referees: Péter Berettyán, Dr. Zsolt Varga; Fourth official: Tamás Márkus; Goal-line assistants: Balázs Berke, Róbert Nagy

20 May 2017 32	Videoton	4–1	Ferencváros	Felcsút
20:30 CEST (UTC+2)	Lazović 36'; Stopira 42'; Koch 45' (o.g.); Marić 90+3'	Report	Négo 7' (o.g.); Koch (yellow card) 23'; Hajnal (yellow card) 32'; Moutari (yellow card) 62'	Stadium: Pancho Aréna; Attendance: 3,208; Referee: Zoltán Iványi; Assistant referees: István Albert, Balázs Buzás; Fourth official: Gábor Takács; Goal-line assistants: Balázs Berke, Szabolcs Szilasi

27 May 2017 33	Honvéd	1–0	Videoton	Budapest
19:00 CEST (UTC+2)	Lanzafame (yellow card) 41'; Eppel 60'; Zsótér (yellow card) 68'; Vasiljević (yellow card) 83'	Report	Lazović (yellow card) 41'; Vinícius (yellow card) 90+3'	Stadium: Bozsik József Stadion; Attendance: 8,500; Referee: Tamás Bognár; Assistant referees: Balázs Buzás, Balázs Szert; Fourth official: János Medovarszki; Goal-line assistants: Ferenc Karakó, János Takács

=== Magyar Kupa ===
14 September 2016 Round of 128	Pécs	0–4	Videoton	Pécs
18:00 CEST (UTC+2)	Krapecz (yellow card) 60'	Report	Šćepović 2', 33', 35'; Hadžić 10'; Szolnoki (yellow card) 75'; Fiola (yellow card) 84'	Stadium: Stadion PMFC; Attendance: 500; Referee: Gábor Barna; Assistant referees: Balázs Kiss, Attila Nagy

26 October 2016 Round of 64	Makó	1–6	Videoton	Makó
13:30 CEST (UTC+2)	Széll 26'	Report	Feczesin 5', 37'; Bódi 13'; I. Kovács 42'; Bévárdi 57'; Pölöskei 63'	Stadium: Erdei Ferenc téri Sporttelep; Attendance: 400; Referee: Gábor Oláh; Assistant referees: Zoltán Pápai, Norbert Bornemissza

30 November 2016 Round of 32	Budafok	2–1	Videoton	Budapest
12:00 CET (UTC+1)	Grúz 29', (yellow card) 64'; Ladányi (yellow card) 51'; D. Kovács 84'; Csizmadia (yellow card) 88'	Report	Bódi 67'	Stadium: Promontor utcai Stadion; Attendance: 200; Referee: Attila Molnár; Assistant referees: Gábor Erős, Balázs Szalai; Fourth official: Bálint Dolnegó

=== UEFA Europa League ===
==== Qualifying rounds ====
===== First qualifying round =====
30 June 2016 First leg	Videoton (Hungary)	3–0	(Moldova) Zaria Bălți	Felcsút, Hungary
18:00 CEST (UTC+2)	Géresi 18'; Négo (yellow card) 55'; Feczesin 88', 90+4', (yellow card) 90+3'	Report	Picușceac (yellow card) 34' (yellow-red card) 53'; Novicov (yellow card) 35'; Suvorov (red card) 90+2'	Stadium: Pancho Aréna; Attendance: 2,321; Referee: Enea Jorgji (Albania); Assistant referees: Ermal Barushi (Albania), Rejdi Avdo (Albania); Fourth official: Klajdi Kola (Albania)

7 July 2016 Second leg	Zaria Bălți (Moldova)	2–0 (2–3 agg.)	(Hungary) Videoton	Chișinău, Moldova (Note: The match was played at the Zimbru Stadium in Chișinău, instead of Zaria Bălți regular stadium, the Stadionul Orășenesc in Bălți.)
20:00 EEST (UTC+3)	Mihaliov 9'; Gómez (yellow card) 26'; Ovseanicov 29'; Onica (yellow card) 47'	Report	Simon (yellow card) 78'; Szolnoki (yellow card) 85'	Stadium: Zimbru Stadium; Attendance: 2,097; Referee: Fyodor Zammit (Malta); Assistant referees: Duncan Sultana (Malta), Roberto Vella (Malta); Fourth official: Glen Tonna (Malta)
Note: Videoton won 3–2 on aggregate.

===== Second qualifying round =====
14 July 2016 First leg	Videoton (Hungary)	2–0	(Serbia) Čukarički	Felcsút, Hungary
20:30 CEST (UTC+2)	Bódi 58'; Négo (yellow card) 68' (yellow-red card) 80'; Feczesin (yellow card) 86'; Suljić 90+2'	Report	Kajević (yellow card) 30'; Lagator (yellow card) 63'; Matić (yellow card) 87'	Stadium: Pancho Aréna; Attendance: 1,858; Referee: Mads-Kristoffer Kristoffersen (Denmark); Assistant referees: Lars Rix (Denmark), D. Wollenberg Rasmussen (Denmark); Fourth official: Jens Maae (Denmark)

21 July 2016 Second leg	Čukarički (Serbia)	1–1 (1–3 agg.)	(Hungary) Videoton	Belgrade, Serbia
20:30 CEST (UTC+2)	Fofana 13'; Regan (yellow card) 71'; Matić (yellow card) 83'; Mandić (yellow card) 87'	Report	Simon (yellow card) 62'; Géresi 76'; Szolnoki (yellow card) 83'	Stadium: Čukarički Stadium; Attendance: 1,653; Referee: Alexandre Boucaut (Belgium); Assistant referees: Jimmy Cremers (Belgium), Kristof Meers (Belgium); Fourth official: Christof Dierick (Belgium)
Note: Videoton won 3–1 on aggregate.

===== Third qualifying round =====
28 July 2016 First leg	Videoton (Hungary)	0–1	(Denmark) Midtjylland	Felcsút, Hungary
20:30 CEST (UTC+2)	Pátkai (yellow card) 47'; Oliveira (yellow card) 88'	Report	Kristensen (yellow card) 16'; Novák 55'; Onuachu (yellow card) 77'	Stadium: Pancho Aréna; Attendance: 2,899; Referee: Ville Nevalainen (Finland); Assistant referees: Ville Koskiniemi (Finland), Sami Nykänen (Finland); Fourth official: Dennis Antamo (Finland)

4 August 2016 Second leg	Midtjylland (Denmark)	1–1 (a.e.t.) (2–1 agg.)	(Hungary) Videoton	Herning, Denmark
18:00 CEST (UTC+2)	Hansen (yellow card) 22'; Novák (yellow card) 45', (goal) 104'; Onuachu (yellow card) 46'; Banggaard (yellow card) 74'; Duelund (yellow card) 116'	Report	Lang (yellow card) 19'; Vinícius (red card) 47'; Szolnoki (yellow card) 56'; Barczi (yellow card) 57'; I. Kovács 75'; Juhász (yellow card) 111'; Bódi (yellow card) 120+2'	Stadium: MCH Arena; Attendance: 6,258; Referee: Marco Guida (Italy); Assistant referees: Matteo Passeri (Italy), Valentino Fiorito (Italy); Fourth official: Carmine Russo (Italy)
Note: Midtjylland won 2–1 on aggregate.

== Statistics ==
=== Overall ===
Appearances (Apps) numbers are for appearances in competitive games only, including sub appearances.
Source: Competitions

No.	Player	Pos.	Nemzeti Bajnokság I				Magyar Kupa				UEFA Europa League				Total			
No.	Player	Pos.	Apps	Goal	Booked	Sent off (straight red)	Apps	Goal	Booked	Sent off (straight red)	Apps	Goal	Booked	Sent off (straight red)	Apps	Goal	Booked	Sent off (straight red)
1	(Hungary) Tamás Horváth	GK					3								3			
3	(Brazil) Paulo Vinícius	DF	32	2	4		3				6			1	41	2	4	1
5	(Hungary) Attila Fiola	DF	17		3		1		1						18		4	
6	(Hungary) András Fejes	DF	4				2				2				8			
7	(Serbia) Danko Lazović	FW	30	10	5	1					1				31	10	5	1
8	(Hungary) Zsolt Pölöskei	MF					2	1							2	1		
9	(Hungary) Róbert Feczesin	FW	18	8	1		2	2			6	2	2		26	12	3	
9	(Croatia) Mirko Marić	FW	12	2											12	2		
10	(Hungary) István Kovács	MF	12		1		3	1			2	1			17	2	1	
11	(France) Loïc Négo	DF	32	2	7		3				5		3	1	40	2	10	1
14	(Hungary) Zsombor Bévárdi	MF					2	1							2	1		
15	(Hungary) Viktor Sejben	MF	1												1			
16	(Portugal) Filipe Oliveira	MF	5		1		1				4		1		10		2	
17	(Hungary) Máté Pátkai	MF	31	3	6						5		1		36	3	7	
18	(Hungary) Ádám Lang	DF	7	2							5		1		12	2	1	
19	(Hungary) Sándor Kovács	MF					2								2			
22	(Cape Verde) Stopira	DF	24	5	3		3				5				32	5	3	
23	(Hungary) Roland Juhász	DF	30	2	6		1				1		1		32	2	7	
25	(Hungary) Patrik Schiller	MF																
27	(Hungary) Ádám Bódi	MF	11				3	2			6	1	1		20	3	1	
30	(Hungary) Roland Szolnoki	DF	21		5		1		1		6		3		28		9	
31	(Hungary) Dávid Barczi	MF	5				2				5		1		12		1	
33	(Hungary) József Varga	MF	17		5		1								18		5	
39	(Hungary) András Lénárt	MF					1								1			
44	(Serbia) Marko Šćepović	FW	24	13	2		1	3							25	16	2	
46	(Hungary) Ádám Simon	MF	1		1						3		2		4		3	
49	(Hungary) Krisztián Géresi	MF	30	6			1				6	2			37	8		
74	(Hungary) Ádám Kovácsik	GK	33								6				39			
75	(Hungary) Bence Varga	DF					2								2			
88	(Bosnia and Herzegovina) Anel Hadžić	MF	20	4	5		2	1							22	5	5	
95	(Hungary) Márton Lorentz	DF																
99	(Bosnia and Herzegovina) Asmir Suljić	MF	18	2	4						6	1			24	3	4	
Own goals				4												4		
Totals				65	59	1		11	2			7	16	2		83	77	3

=== Hat-tricks ===
No.	Player	Against	Result	Date	Competition
44	(Serbia) Marko Šćepović	Pécs (A)	4–0	14 September 2016	Magyar Kupa

=== Clean sheets ===
			Clean sheets			
No.	Player	Games Played	Nemzeti Bajnokság I	Magyar Kupa	UEFA Europa League	Total
74	(Hungary) Ádám Kovácsik	39	13		2	15
1	(Hungary) Tamás Horváth	3		1		1
Totals			13	1	2	16
