= 2016–17 UEFA Europa League qualifying =

Football tournament qualification stage

The 2016–17 UEFA Europa League qualifying phase and play-off round began on 28 June and ended on 25 August 2016. A total of 154 teams competed in the qualifying phase and play-off round to decide 22 of the 48 places in the group stage of the 2016–17 UEFA Europa League.

All times are CEST (UTC+2).

== Round and draw dates ==
The schedule of the competition was as follows (all draws were held at the UEFA headquarters in Nyon, Switzerland, unless stated otherwise).

Round	Draw date and time	First leg	Second leg
First qualifying round	20 June 2016, 13:00	30 June 2016	7 July 2016
Second qualifying round	20 June 2016, 14:30	14 July 2016	21 July 2016
Third qualifying round	15 July 2016, 13:00	28 July 2016	4 August 2016
Play-off round	5 August 2016, 13:00	18 August 2016	25 August 2016

Matches could also be played on Tuesdays or Wednesdays instead of the regular Thursdays due to scheduling conflicts.

== Format ==
In the qualifying phase and play-off round, each tie was played over two legs, with each team playing one leg at home. The team that scored more goals on aggregate over the two legs advanced to the next round. If the aggregate score was level, the away goals rule would be applied, i.e., the team that scored more goals away from home over the two legs advanced. If away goals were also equal, then thirty minutes of extra time would be played, divided into two fifteen-minutes halves. The away goals rule would be again applied after extra time, i.e., if there were goals scored during extra time and the aggregate score was still level, the visiting team advanced by virtue of more away goals scored. If no goals were scored during extra time, the tie would be decided by penalty shoot-out.

In the draws for each round, teams were seeded based on their UEFA club coefficients at the beginning of the season, with the teams divided into seeded and unseeded pots. A seeded team was drawn against an unseeded team, with the order of legs in each tie decided by draw. Due to the limited time between matches, the draws for the second and third qualifying rounds took place before the results of the previous round were known. For these draws (or in any cases where the result of a tie in the previous round was not known at the time of the draw), the seeding was carried out under the assumption that the team with the higher coefficient of an undecided tie advanced to this round, which means if the team with the lower coefficient was to advance, it simply took the seeding of its defeated opponent. Prior to the draws, UEFA may form "groups" in accordance with the principles set by the Club Competitions Committee, but they are purely for convenience of the draw and for ensuring that teams from the same association are not drawn against each other, and do not resemble any real groupings in the sense of the competition.

== Teams ==
A total of 154 teams were involved in the qualifying phase and play-off round (including the 15 losers of the Champions League third qualifying round which enter the play-off round). The 22 winners of the play-off round advanced to the group stage to join the 16 teams which enter in the group stage and the 10 losers of the Champions League play-off round.

Below are the participating teams (with their 2016 UEFA club coefficients), grouped by their starting rounds.

Key to colours
Winners of the play-off round advance to the group stage

Play-off round
Team	Coeff
(Ukraine) Shakhtar Donetsk	81.976
(Greece) Olympiacos	70.940
(Belgium) Anderlecht	54.000
(Turkey) Fenerbahçe	40.920
(Czech Republic) Sparta Prague	40.585
(Greece) PAOK	37.440
(Belarus) BATE Borisov	34.000
(Azerbaijan) Qarabağ	13.475
(Norway) Rosenborg	12.850
(Kazakhstan) Astana	12.575
(Romania) Astra Giurgiu	11.076
(Serbia) Red Star Belgrade	7.175
(Georgia (country)) Dinamo Tbilisi	5.875
(Slovakia) Trenčín	5.400
(Albania) Partizani	1.575

Third qualifying round
Team	Coeff
(Netherlands) AZ	43.612
(France) Lille	29.549
(France) Saint-Étienne	26.049
(Belgium) Gent	25.000
(Russia) Krasnodar	24.216
(Austria) Rapid Wien	23.520
(Czech Republic) Slovan Liberec	22.085
(Russia) Spartak Moscow	19.216
(England) West Ham United	16.256
(Germany) Hertha BSC	16.035
(Greece) Panathinaikos	14.940
(Croatia) Rijeka	14.275
(Italy) Sassuolo	14.087
(Portugal) Rio Ave	13.616
(Ukraine) Vorskla Poltava	11.976
(Portugal) Arouca	10.616
(Cyprus) Apollon Limassol	10.435
(Czech Republic) Mladá Boleslav	10.085
(Ukraine) Oleksandriya	8.976
(Switzerland) Luzern	8.775
(Greece) AEK Athens	7.940
(Turkey) İstanbul Başakşehir	7.920
(Netherlands) Heracles Almelo	7.112
(Romania) Pandurii Târgu Jiu	7.076
(Romania) Viitorul Constanța	5.076

Second qualifying round
Team	Coeff
(Belgium) Genk	36.000
(Slovenia) Maribor	21.625
Austria Wien	19.020
(Serbia) Partizan	16.925
(Israel) Maccabi Haifa	11.725
(Croatia) Hajduk Split	10.775
(Switzerland) Grasshopper	9.755
(Norway) Strømsgodset	7.850
(Turkey) Osmanlıspor	6.920
(Czech Republic) Slavia Prague	6.585
(Sweden) BK Häcken	5.975
(Greece) PAS Giannina	5.940
(Romania) CSM Politehnica Iași	5.076
(Poland) Piast Gliwice	5.000
(Bulgaria) Levski Sofia	4.375
(Belarus) Torpedo-BelAZ Zhodino	4.250
(Scotland) Hibernian	3.960
(Denmark) SønderjyskE	3.720

First qualifying round
Team	Coeff
(Israel) Maccabi Tel Aviv	20.225
(Denmark) Midtjylland	14.720
(Finland) HJK	10.980
(Belarus) Dinamo Minsk	10.000
(Cyprus) Omonia	9.935
(Azerbaijan) Neftçi	9.725
(Cyprus) AEK Larnaca	9.435
(Sweden) AIK	8.975
(Slovakia) Slovan Bratislava	8.900
(Hungary) Videoton	8.725
(Kazakhstan) Aktobe	8.075
(Serbia) Vojvodina	7.925
(Belarus) Shakhtyor Soligorsk	7.500
(Slovakia) Spartak Trnava	7.400
(Denmark) Brøndby	7.220
(Sweden) IFK Göteborg	6.475
(Hungary) Debrecen	6.475
(Scotland) Heart of Midlothian	6.460
(Latvia) Ventspils	6.075
(Austria) Admira Wacker Mödling	6.020
(Croatia) Lokomotiva Zagreb	5.775
(Iceland) KR	5.750
(Georgia (country)) Dila Gori	5.625
(Scotland) Aberdeen	5.460
(Norway) Odd	5.350
(Azerbaijan) Gabala	5.225
(North Macedonia) Rabotnicki	5.200
(Liechtenstein) Vaduz	4.850
(Kazakhstan) Kairat	4.825
(Luxembourg) Differdange 03	4.800
(Republic of Ireland) Shamrock Rovers	4.590
(Republic of Ireland) St Patrick's Athletic	4.590
(Poland) Zagłębie Lubin	4.500
(Poland) Cracovia	4.500
(Northern Ireland) Linfield	4.400
(Moldova) Dacia Chișinău	4.325
(Israel) Beitar Jerusalem	4.225
(Norway) Stabæk	4.100
(Albania) Kukësi	4.075
(Serbia) Čukarički	3.925
(Estonia) Levadia Tallinn	3.850
(Estonia) Nõmme Kalju	3.850
(Armenia) Pyunik	3.825
(Moldova) Zimbru Chișinău	3.825
(Iceland) Breiðablik	3.750
(Bosnia and Herzegovina) Široki Brijeg	3.675
(Bulgaria) Beroe Stara Zagora	3.625
(Slovenia) Domžale	3.625
(Kazakhstan) Ordabasy	3.575
(Luxembourg) Fola Esch	3.550
(Northern Ireland) Cliftonville	3.400
(Montenegro) Rudar Pljevlja	3.225
(Faroe Islands) HB	3.225
(Slovenia) Gorica	3.125
(Georgia (country)) Chikhura Sachkhere	3.125
(Armenia) Shirak	3.075
(Montenegro) Budućnost Podgorica	2.975
(Azerbaijan) Kapaz	2.975
(Malta) Birkirkara	2.966
(North Macedonia) Shkëndija	2.950
(Faroe Islands) Víkingur Gøta	2.725
(Bulgaria) Slavia Sofia	2.625
(Hungary) MTK Budapest	2.475
(Malta) Hibernians	2.466
(Slovakia) Spartak Myjava	2.400
(Lithuania) Sūduva	2.175
(Luxembourg) Jeunesse Esch	2.050
(Finland) RoPS	1.980
(Latvia) Jelgava	1.825
(Albania) Teuta	1.825
(Moldova) Zaria Bălți	1.825
(Iceland) Valur	1.750
(Finland) Mariehamn	1.730
(Andorra) Lusitanos	1.699
(Lithuania) Atlantas	1.675
(Georgia (country)) Samtredia	1.625
(Latvia) Spartaks Jūrmala	1.575
(Albania) Partizani	1.575
(Armenia) Banants	1.575
(Faroe Islands) NSÍ	1.475
(Lithuania) Trakai	1.425
(Bosnia and Herzegovina) Radnik Bijeljina	1.425
(Bosnia and Herzegovina) Sloboda Tuzla	1.425
(Northern Ireland) Glenavon	1.400
(Republic of Ireland) Cork City	1.340
(San Marino) La Fiorita	1.316
(Wales) Bala Town	1.200
(North Macedonia) Sileks	1.200
(Andorra) UE Santa Coloma	1.199
(Montenegro) Bokelj	0.975
(Malta) Balzan	0.966
(Estonia) Infonet Tallinn	0.850
(San Marino) Folgore	0.816
(Gibraltar) Europa	0.700
(Wales) Llandudno	0.700
(Wales) Connah's Quay Nomads	0.700

Notes

1. ^{CL-CR} Losers of the Champions League third qualifying round (Champions Route).
2. ^{CL-LR} Losers of the Champions League third qualifying round (League Route).
3. ^{*} Partizani were transferred to the 2016–17 UEFA Champions League second qualifying round to replace Skënderbeu who were excluded by UEFA for match-fixing.

== First qualifying round ==
=== Seeding ===
A total of 96 teams played in the first qualifying round. The draw was held on 20 June 2016. Teams were pre-assigned numbers by UEFA so that the draw could be held in one run for all groups with ten teams and another run for the groups with eight teams.

Group 1		Group 2		Group 3	
Seeded	Unseeded	Seeded	Unseeded	Seeded	Unseeded
(Denmark) Midtjylland (5) (Scotland) Heart of Midlothian (2) (Latvia) Ventspils (4) (Northern Ireland) Linfield (3) (Norway) Stabæk (1)	(Faroe Islands) Víkingur Gøta (6) (Lithuania) Sūduva (7) (Republic of Ireland) Cork City (8) (Estonia) Infonet Tallinn (9) (Wales) Connah's Quay Nomads (10)	(Finland) HJK (2) (Sweden) IFK Göteborg (1) (Iceland) KR (3) (Republic of Ireland) St Patrick's Athletic (4) (Estonia) Levadia Tallinn (5)	(Faroe Islands) HB (7) (Luxembourg) Jeunesse Esch (6) (Lithuania) Atlantas (9) (Northern Ireland) Glenavon (8) (Wales) Llandudno (10)	(Belarus) Dinamo Minsk (3) (Denmark) Brøndby (2) (Scotland) Aberdeen (1) (Republic of Ireland) Shamrock Rovers (5) (Estonia) Nõmme Kalju (4)	(Luxembourg) Fola Esch (10) (Finland) RoPS (7) (Iceland) Valur (9) (Latvia) Spartaks Jūrmala (8) (Lithuania) Trakai (6)
Group 4		Group 5		Group 6	
Seeded	Unseeded	Seeded	Unseeded	Seeded	Unseeded
(Sweden) AIK (1) (Belarus) Shakhtyor Soligorsk (2) (Norway) Odd (3) (Luxembourg) Differdange 03 (4) (Iceland) Breiðablik (5)	(Northern Ireland) Cliftonville (6) (Latvia) Jelgava (7) (Finland) Mariehamn (8) (Faroe Islands) NSÍ (9) (Wales) Bala Town (10)	(Cyprus) AEK Larnaca (1) (Serbia) Vojvodina (2) (Georgia (country)) Dila Gori (4) (Bosnia and Herzegovina) Široki Brijeg (3) (Slovenia) Domžale (5)	(Armenia) Shirak (6) (Malta) Birkirkara (8) (Andorra) Lusitanos (7) (Montenegro) Bokelj (9) (San Marino) Folgore (10)	(Hungary) Videoton (5) (Croatia) Lokomotiva Zagreb (2) (North Macedonia) Rabotnicki (3) (Serbia) Čukarički (4) (Armenia) Pyunik (1)	(Kazakhstan) Ordabasy (6) (Montenegro) Budućnost Podgorica (8) (Moldova) Zaria Bălți (7) (Andorra) UE Santa Coloma (9) (Gibraltar) Europa (10)
Group 7		Group 8		Group 9	
Seeded	Unseeded	Seeded	Unseeded	Seeded	Unseeded
(Azerbaijan) Neftçi (4) (Austria) Admira Wacker Mödling (3) (Israel) Beitar Jerusalem (2) (Albania) Kukësi (1) (Moldova) Zimbru Chișinău (5)	(Montenegro) Rudar Pljevlja (10) (Georgia (country)) Chikhura Sachkhere (7) (Slovakia) Spartak Myjava (8) (Bosnia and Herzegovina) Sloboda Tuzla (9) (Malta) Balzan (6)	(Israel) Maccabi Tel Aviv (4) (Hungary) Debrecen (2) (Azerbaijan) Gabala (3) (Liechtenstein) Vaduz (1) (Bulgaria) Beroe Stara Zagora (5)	(Slovenia) Gorica (6) (Georgia (country)) Samtredia (8) (Bosnia and Herzegovina) Radnik Bijeljina (7) (San Marino) La Fiorita (9) (North Macedonia) Sileks (10)	(Cyprus) Omonia (4) (Slovakia) Spartak Trnava (2) (Kazakhstan) Kairat (3) (Poland) Cracovia (1)	(North Macedonia) Shkëndija (5) (Malta) Hibernians (7) (Albania) Teuta (6) (Armenia) Banants (8)
Group 10					
Seeded	Unseeded				
(Slovakia) Slovan Bratislava (4) (Kazakhstan) Aktobe (2) (Poland) Zagłębie Lubin (3) (Moldova) Dacia Chișinău (1)	(Azerbaijan) Kapaz (5) (Bulgaria) Slavia Sofia (6) (Hungary) MTK Budapest (7) (Albania) Partizani (8)				

=== Summary ===
The first legs were played on 28 and 30 June, and the second legs were played on 5, 6 and 7 July 2016.

Team 1	Agg.	Team 2	1st leg	2nd leg
Midtjylland (Denmark)	2–0	(Lithuania) Sūduva	1–0	1–0
Heart of Midlothian (Scotland)	6–3 (Note: Order of legs reversed after original draw.)	(Estonia) Infonet Tallinn	2–1	4–2
Connah's Quay Nomads (Wales)	1–0	(Norway) Stabæk	0–0	1–0
Ventspils (Latvia)	4–0	(Faroe Islands) Víkingur Gøta	2–0	2–0
Linfield (Northern Ireland)	1–2	(Republic of Ireland) Cork City	0–1	1–1
Levadia Tallinn (Estonia)	3–1	(Faroe Islands) HB	1–1	2–0
Atlantas (Lithuania)	1–3	(Finland) HJK	0–2	1–1
IFK Göteborg (Sweden)	7–1	(Wales) Llandudno	5–0	2–1
St Patrick's Athletic (Republic of Ireland)	2–2 (a)	(Luxembourg) Jeunesse Esch	1–0	1–2
KR (Iceland)	8–1	(Northern Ireland) Glenavon	2–1	6–0
Shamrock Rovers (Republic of Ireland)	1–3	(Finland) RoPS	0–2	1–1
Valur (Iceland)	1–10	(Denmark) Brøndby	1–4	0–6
Aberdeen (Scotland)	3–2	(Luxembourg) Fola Esch	3–1	0–1
Trakai (Lithuania)	3–5	(Estonia) Nõmme Kalju	2–1	1–4
Dinamo Minsk (Belarus)	4–1	(Latvia) Spartaks Jūrmala	2–1	2–0
Breiðablik (Iceland)	4–5	(Latvia) Jelgava	2–3	2–2
NSÍ (Faroe Islands)	0–7	(Belarus) Shakhtyor Soligorsk	0–2	0–5
AIK (Sweden)	4–0	(Wales) Bala Town	2–0	2–0
Differdange 03 (Luxembourg)	1–3	(Northern Ireland) Cliftonville	1–1	0–2
Odd (Norway)	3–1	(Finland) Mariehamn	2–0	1–1
Domžale (Slovenia)	5–2	(Andorra) Lusitanos	3–1	2–1
Bokelj (Montenegro)	1–6	(Serbia) Vojvodina	1–1	0–5
AEK Larnaca (Cyprus)	6–1	(San Marino) Folgore	3–0	3–1
Dila Gori (Georgia (country))	1–1 (1–4 p)	(Armenia) Shirak	1–0	0–1 (a.e.t.)
Široki Brijeg (Bosnia and Herzegovina)	1–3	(Malta) Birkirkara	1–1	0–2
Videoton (Hungary)	3–2	(Moldova) Zaria Bălți	3–0	0–2
UE Santa Coloma (Andorra)	2–7	(Croatia) Lokomotiva Zagreb	1–3	1–4
Europa (Gibraltar)	3–2	(Armenia) Pyunik	2–0	1–2
Čukarički (Serbia)	6–3	(Kazakhstan) Ordabasy	3–0	3–3
Rabotnicki (North Macedonia)	1–2	(Montenegro) Budućnost Podgorica	1–1	0–1
Zimbru Chișinău (Moldova)	3–3 (a)	(Georgia (country)) Chikhura Sachkhere	0–1	3–2
Sloboda Tuzla (Bosnia and Herzegovina)	0–1	(Israel) Beitar Jerusalem	0–0	0–1
Kukësi (Albania)	2–1	(Montenegro) Rudar Pljevlja	1–1	1–0
Balzan (Malta)	2–3	(Azerbaijan) Neftçi	0–2	2–1
Admira Wacker Mödling (Austria)	4–3	(Slovakia) Spartak Myjava	1–1	3–2
Beroe Stara Zagora (Bulgaria)	2–0	(Bosnia and Herzegovina) Radnik Bijeljina	0–0	2–0
La Fiorita (San Marino)	0–7	(Hungary) Debrecen	0–5	0–2
Vaduz (Liechtenstein)	5–2	(North Macedonia) Sileks	3–1	2–1
Maccabi Tel Aviv (Israel)	4–0	(Slovenia) Gorica	3–0	1–0
Gabala (Azerbaijan)	6–3	(Georgia (country)) Samtredia	5–1	1–2
Teuta (Albania)	0–6	(Kazakhstan) Kairat	0–1	0–5
Spartak Trnava (Slovakia)	6–0	(Malta) Hibernians	3–0	3–0
Banants (Armenia)	1–5	(Cyprus) Omonia	0–1	1–4 (a.e.t.)
Shkëndija (North Macedonia)	4–1	(Poland) Cracovia	2–0	2–1
Slavia Sofia (Bulgaria)	1–3	(Poland) Zagłębie Lubin	1–0	0–3
Aktobe (Kazakhstan)	1–3	(Hungary) MTK Budapest	1–1	0–2
Partizani (Albania)	w/o (Note: Partizani replaced Skënderbeu in the 2016–17 UEFA Champions League second qualifying round and Slovan Bratislava proceeded directly to the UEFA Europa League second qualifying round, after Skënderbeu was excluded by UEFA for match-fixing.)	(Slovakia) Slovan Bratislava	0–0	Canc.
Kapaz (Azerbaijan)	1–0	(Moldova) Dacia Chișinău	0–0	1–0

== Second qualifying round ==
=== Seeding ===
A total of 66 teams played in the second qualifying round: 18 teams which entered in this round, and the 48 winners of the first qualifying round. The draw was held on 20 June 2016. Teams were pre-assigned numbers by UEFA so that the draw could be held in one run for all groups with ten teams and another run for the groups with twelve teams.

Group 1		Group 2		Group 3	
Seeded	Unseeded	Seeded	Unseeded	Seeded	Unseeded
(Serbia) Partizan (5) (Israel) Maccabi Haifa (4) (Belarus) Dinamo Minsk (3) (Serbia) Vojvodina (1) (Slovakia) Spartak Trnava (2)	(Armenia) Shirak (6) (Republic of Ireland) St Patrick's Athletic (10) (Poland) Zagłębie Lubin (7) (Wales) Connah's Quay Nomads (8) (Estonia) Nõmme Kalju (9)	Austria Wien (5) (Finland) HJK (4) (Hungary) MTK Budapest (1) (Belarus) Shakhtyor Soligorsk (3) (Denmark) Brøndby (2)	(Azerbaijan) Gabala (8) (Albania) Kukësi (7) (Scotland) Hibernian (6) (Bulgaria) Beroe Stara Zagora (9) (Slovenia) Domžale (10)	(Denmark) Midtjylland (1) (Switzerland) Grasshopper (5) (Azerbaijan) Neftçi (3) (Turkey) Osmanlıspor (4) (Croatia) Lokomotiva Zagreb (2)	(Iceland) KR (7) (Liechtenstein) Vaduz (8) (Finland) RoPS (6) (North Macedonia) Shkëndija (10) (Moldova) Zimbru Chișinău (9)
Group 4		Group 5		Group 6	
Seeded	Unseeded	Seeded	Unseeded	Seeded	Unseeded
(Slovenia) Maribor (6) (Cyprus) Omonia (5) (Slovakia) Slovan Bratislava (3) (Sweden) IFK Göteborg (4) (Scotland) Heart of Midlothian (2) (Greece) PAS Giannina (1)	(Norway) Odd (7) (Poland) Piast Gliwice (9) (Bulgaria) Levski Sofia (11) (Israel) Beitar Jerusalem (10) (Latvia) Jelgava (8) (Malta) Birkirkara (12)	(Israel) Maccabi Tel Aviv (4) (Croatia) Hajduk Split (5) (Hungary) Debrecen (3) (Austria) Admira Wacker Mödling (1) (Latvia) Ventspils (2) (Sweden) BK Häcken (6)	(Scotland) Aberdeen (12) (Romania) CSM Politehnica Iași (10) (Kazakhstan) Kairat (9) (Republic of Ireland) Cork City (11) (Azerbaijan) Kapaz (7) (Belarus) Torpedo-BelAZ Zhodino (8)	(Belgium) Genk (3) (Cyprus) AEK Larnaca (2) (Sweden) AIK (6) (Hungary) Videoton (1) (Norway) Strømsgodset (5) (Czech Republic) Slavia Prague (4)	(Montenegro) Budućnost Podgorica (8) (Northern Ireland) Cliftonville (12) (Serbia) Čukarički (7) (Estonia) Levadia Tallinn (9) (Gibraltar) Europa (11) (Denmark) SønderjyskE (10)

Notes

1. ^{†} Winners of the first qualifying round whose identity was not known at the time of the draw. Teams in italics defeated a team with a higher coefficient in the first qualifying round, thus effectively taking the coefficient of their defeated opponent in the draw for the second qualifying round.

=== Summary ===
The first legs were played on 14 July, and the second legs were played on 20 and 21 July 2016.

Team 1	Agg.	Team 2	1st leg	2nd leg
Shirak (Armenia)	1–3	(Slovakia) Spartak Trnava	1–1	0–2
Dinamo Minsk (Belarus)	2–1	(Republic of Ireland) St Patrick's Athletic	1–1	1–0
Partizan (Serbia)	0–0 (3–4 p)	(Poland) Zagłębie Lubin	0–0	0–0 (a.e.t.)
Vojvodina (Serbia)	3–1	(Wales) Connah's Quay Nomads	1–0	2–1
Maccabi Haifa (Israel)	2–2 (3–5 p) (Note: Order of legs reversed after original draw.)	(Estonia) Nõmme Kalju	1–1	1–1 (a.e.t.)
Hibernian (Scotland)	1–1 (3–5 p)	(Denmark) Brøndby	0–1	1–0 (a.e.t.)
Shakhtyor Soligorsk (Belarus)	2–3	(Slovenia) Domžale	1–1	1–2
Austria Wien	5–1	(Albania) Kukësi	1–0	4–1
MTK Budapest (Hungary)	1–4	(Azerbaijan) Gabala	1–2	0–2
Beroe Stara Zagora (Bulgaria)	1–2	(Finland) HJK	1–1	0–1
RoPS (Finland)	1–4	(Croatia) Lokomotiva Zagreb	1–1	0–3
Neftçi (Azerbaijan)	0–1	(North Macedonia) Shkëndija	0–0	0–1
KR (Iceland)	4–5	(Switzerland) Grasshopper	3–3	1–2
Midtjylland (Denmark)	5–2	(Liechtenstein) Vaduz	3–0	2–2
Zimbru Chișinău (Moldova)	2–7	(Turkey) Osmanlıspor	2–2	0–5
PAS Giannina (Greece)	4–3	(Norway) Odd	3–0	1–3 (a.e.t.)
Birkirkara (Malta)	2–1	(Scotland) Heart of Midlothian	0–0	2–1
Maribor (Slovenia)	1–1 (a)	(Bulgaria) Levski Sofia	0–0	1–1
Piast Gliwice (Poland)	0–3	(Sweden) IFK Göteborg	0–3	0–0
Slovan Bratislava (Slovakia)	0–3	(Latvia) Jelgava	0–0	0–3
Beitar Jerusalem (Israel)	3–3 (a)	(Cyprus) Omonia	1–0	2–3
Admira Wacker Mödling (Austria)	3–0	(Azerbaijan) Kapaz	1–0	2–0
Aberdeen (Scotland)	4–0	(Latvia) Ventspils	3–0	1–0
BK Häcken (Sweden)	1–2	(Republic of Ireland) Cork City	1–1	0–1
Kairat (Kazakhstan)	2–3	(Israel) Maccabi Tel Aviv	1–1	1–2
Debrecen (Hungary)	1–3	(Belarus) Torpedo-BelAZ Zhodino	1–2	0–1
CSM Politehnica Iași (Romania)	3–4	(Croatia) Hajduk Split	2–2	1–2
Videoton (Hungary)	3–1	(Serbia) Čukarički	2–0	1–1
Cliftonville (Northern Ireland)	2–5	(Cyprus) AEK Larnaca	2–3	0–2
AIK (Sweden)	2–0	(Gibraltar) Europa	1–0	1–0
Levadia Tallinn (Estonia)	3–3 (a)	(Czech Republic) Slavia Prague	3–1	0–2
Genk (Belgium)	2–2 (4–2 p)	(Montenegro) Budućnost Podgorica	2–0	0–2 (a.e.t.)
SønderjyskE (Denmark)	4–3	(Norway) Strømsgodset	2–1	2–2 (a.e.t.)

== Third qualifying round ==
=== Seeding ===
A total of 58 teams played in the third qualifying round: 25 teams which entered in this round, and the 33 winners of the second qualifying round. The draw was held on 15 July 2016. Teams were pre-assigned numbers by UEFA so that the draw could be held in one run for the group with 10 teams and another run for all groups with 12 teams.

Group 1		Group 2		Group 3	
Seeded	Unseeded	Seeded	Unseeded	Seeded	Unseeded
(France) Saint-Étienne (1) (Israel) Maccabi Tel Aviv (2) (Russia) Spartak Moscow (3) (Ukraine) Vorskla Poltava (4) (Belarus) Dinamo Minsk (5)	(Cyprus) AEK Larnaca (6) (Greece) AEK Athens (7) (Serbia) Vojvodina (8) (Romania) Pandurii Târgu Jiu (9) (Croatia) Lokomotiva Zagreb (10)	(Netherlands) AZ (1) (Russia) Krasnodar (2) (Poland) Zagłębie Lubin (3) (Italy) Sassuolo (4) (Portugal) Rio Ave (5) (Israel) Beitar Jerusalem (6)	(Latvia) Jelgava (7) (Switzerland) Luzern (8) (Denmark) SønderjyskE (9) (Czech Republic) Slavia Prague (10) (Malta) Birkirkara (11) (Greece) PAS Giannina (12)	(France) Lille (1) (Slovenia) Maribor (2); Austria Wien (3) (Greece) Panathinaikos (4) (Estonia) Nõmme Kalju (5) (Croatia) Hajduk Split (6)	(Ukraine) Oleksandriya (7) (Sweden) AIK (8) (Slovakia) Spartak Trnava (9) (Turkey) Osmanlıspor (10) (Scotland) Aberdeen (11) (Azerbaijan) Gabala (12)
Group 4		Group 5			
Seeded	Unseeded	Seeded	Unseeded		
(Belgium) Genk (1) (Austria) Rapid Wien (2) (Germany) Hertha BSC (3) (Croatia) Rijeka (4) (Portugal) Arouca (5) (Czech Republic) Mladá Boleslav (6)	(North Macedonia) Shkëndija (7) (Turkey) İstanbul Başakşehir (8) (Denmark) Brøndby (9) (Netherlands) Heracles Almelo (10) (Belarus) Torpedo-BelAZ Zhodino (11) (Republic of Ireland) Cork City (12)	(Belgium) Gent (1) (Czech Republic) Slovan Liberec (2) (England) West Ham United (3) (Denmark) Midtjylland (4) (Finland) HJK (5) (Cyprus) Apollon Limassol (6)	(Switzerland) Grasshopper (7) (Hungary) Videoton (8) (Slovenia) Domžale (9) (Sweden) IFK Göteborg (10) (Austria) Admira Wacker Mödling (11) (Romania) Viitorul Constanța (12)		

Notes

1. ^{†} Winners of the second qualifying round whose identity was not known at the time of the draw. Teams in italics defeated a team with a higher coefficient in the second qualifying round, thus effectively taking the coefficient of their defeated opponent in the draw for the third qualifying round.

=== Summary ===
The first legs were played on 28 July, and the second legs were played on 3 and 4 August 2016.

Team 1	Agg.	Team 2	1st leg	2nd leg
Lokomotiva Zagreb (Croatia)	3–2	(Ukraine) Vorskla Poltava	0–0	3–2
Saint-Étienne (France)	1–0	(Greece) AEK Athens	0–0	1–0
AEK Larnaca (Cyprus)	2–1	(Russia) Spartak Moscow	1–1	1–0
Pandurii Târgu Jiu (Romania)	2–5	(Israel) Maccabi Tel Aviv	1–3	1–2
Vojvodina (Serbia)	3–1	(Belarus) Dinamo Minsk	1–1	2–0
Zagłębie Lubin (Poland)	2–3	(Denmark) SønderjyskE	1–2	1–1
Luzern (Switzerland)	1–4	(Italy) Sassuolo	1–1	0–3
Slavia Prague (Czech Republic)	1–1 (a)	(Portugal) Rio Ave	0–0	1–1
Birkirkara (Malta)	1–6	(Russia) Krasnodar	0–3	1–3
AZ (Netherlands)	3–1	(Greece) PAS Giannina	1–0	2–1
Jelgava (Latvia)	1–4	(Israel) Beitar Jerusalem	1–1	0–3
Austria Wien	1–1 (5–4 p)	(Slovakia) Spartak Trnava	0–1	1–0 (a.e.t.)
Panathinaikos (Greece)	3–0 (Note: Order of legs reversed after original draw.)	(Sweden) AIK	1–0	2–0
Osmanlıspor (Turkey)	3–0	(Estonia) Nõmme Kalju	1–0	2–0
Aberdeen (Scotland)	1–2	(Slovenia) Maribor	1–1	0–1
Lille (France)	1–2	(Azerbaijan) Gabala	1–1	0–1
Oleksandriya (Ukraine)	1–6	(Croatia) Hajduk Split	0–3	1–3
Hertha BSC (Germany)	2–3	(Denmark) Brøndby	1–0	1–3
İstanbul Başakşehir (Turkey)	2–2 (a)	(Croatia) Rijeka	0–0	2–2
Heracles Almelo (Netherlands)	1–1 (a)	(Portugal) Arouca	1–1	0–0
Torpedo-BelAZ Zhodino (Belarus)	0–3	(Austria) Rapid Wien	0–0	0–3
Genk (Belgium)	3–1	(Republic of Ireland) Cork City	1–0	2–1
Shkëndija (North Macedonia)	2–1	(Czech Republic) Mladá Boleslav	2–0	0–1
Domžale (Slovenia)	2–4	(England) West Ham United	2–1	0–3
Videoton (Hungary)	1–2	(Denmark) Midtjylland	0–1	1–1 (a.e.t.)
IFK Göteborg (Sweden)	3–2	(Finland) HJK	1–2	2–0
Admira Wacker Mödling (Austria)	1–4	(Czech Republic) Slovan Liberec	1–2	0–2
Gent (Belgium)	5–0	(Romania) Viitorul Constanța	5–0	0–0
Grasshopper (Switzerland)	5–4	(Cyprus) Apollon Limassol	2–1	3–3 (a.e.t.)

== Play-off round ==
=== Seeding ===
A total of 44 teams played in the play-off round: the 29 winners of the third qualifying round, and the 15 losers of the 2016–17 UEFA Champions League third qualifying round. The draw was held on 5 August 2016. Teams were pre-assigned numbers by UEFA so that the draw could be held in one run for all groups with 10 teams and another run for all groups with 12 teams.

Group 1		Group 2	
Seeded	Unseeded	Seeded	Unseeded
(Greece) Olympiacos (2) (Belgium) Genk (1) (Belarus) BATE Borisov (3) (Austria) Rapid Wien (5) (Denmark) Midtjylland (4)	(Kazakhstan) Astana (6) (Portugal) Arouca (8) (Turkey) Osmanlıspor (7) (Croatia) Lokomotiva Zagreb (9) (Slovakia) Trenčín (10)	(Netherlands) AZ (1) (Greece) PAOK (2) (France) Saint-Étienne (5) (Czech Republic) Slovan Liberec (3); Austria Wien (4)	(Norway) Rosenborg (7) (Cyprus) AEK Larnaca (6) (Serbia) Vojvodina (9) (Georgia (country)) Dinamo Tbilisi (8) (Israel) Beitar Jerusalem (10)
Group 3		Group 4	
Seeded	Unseeded	Seeded	Unseeded
(Belgium) Anderlecht (1) (Turkey) Fenerbahçe (5) (Russia) Krasnodar (3) (Slovenia) Maribor (4) (England) West Ham United (2) (Greece) Panathinaikos (6)	(Romania) Astra Giurgiu (11) (Switzerland) Grasshopper (10) (Denmark) Brøndby (9) (Czech Republic) Slavia Prague (8) (Azerbaijan) Gabala (7) (Albania) Partizani (12)	(Ukraine) Shakhtar Donetsk (1) (Czech Republic) Sparta Prague (2) (Belgium) Gent (4) (Israel) Maccabi Tel Aviv (3) (Italy) Sassuolo (5) (Azerbaijan) Qarabağ (6)	(Croatia) Hajduk Split (12) (Turkey) İstanbul Başakşehir (8) (Serbia) Red Star Belgrade (10) (Sweden) IFK Göteborg (9) (Denmark) SønderjyskE (11) (North Macedonia) Shkëndija (7)

Notes

1. ^{†} Winners of the third qualifying round.
2. ^{CL} Losers of the Champions League third qualifying round.

=== Summary ===
The first legs were played on 17 and 18 August, and the second legs were played on 25 August 2016.

Team 1	Agg.	Team 2	1st leg	2nd leg
Astana (Kazakhstan)	4–2	(Belarus) BATE Borisov	2–0	2–2
Arouca (Portugal)	1–3	(Greece) Olympiacos	0–1	1–2 (a.e.t.)
Midtjylland (Denmark)	0–3	(Turkey) Osmanlıspor	0–1	0–2
Trenčín (Slovakia)	2–4	(Austria) Rapid Wien	0–4	2–0
Lokomotiva Zagreb (Croatia)	2–4	(Belgium) Genk	2–2	0–2
AEK Larnaca (Cyprus)	0–4	(Czech Republic) Slovan Liberec	0–1	0–3
Dinamo Tbilisi (Georgia (country))	0–5	(Greece) PAOK	0–3	0–2
Austria Wien	4–2	(Norway) Rosenborg	2–1	2–1
Beitar Jerusalem (Israel)	1–2	(France) Saint-Étienne	1–2	0–0
Vojvodina (Serbia)	0–3	(Netherlands) AZ	0–3	0–0
Gabala (Azerbaijan)	3–2 (Note: Order of legs reversed after original draw.)	(Slovenia) Maribor	3–1	0–1
Slavia Prague (Czech Republic)	0–6	(Belgium) Anderlecht	0–3	0–3
Astra Giurgiu (Romania)	2–1	(England) West Ham United	1–1	1–0
Fenerbahçe (Turkey)	5–0	(Switzerland) Grasshopper	3–0	2–0
Panathinaikos (Greece)	4–1	(Denmark) Brøndby	3–0	1–1
Krasnodar (Russia)	4–0	(Albania) Partizani	4–0	0–0
Gent (Belgium)	6–1	(North Macedonia) Shkëndija	2–1	4–0
İstanbul Başakşehir (Turkey)	1–4	(Ukraine) Shakhtar Donetsk	1–2	0–2
SønderjyskE (Denmark)	2–3	(Czech Republic) Sparta Prague	0–0	2–3
Sassuolo (Italy)	4–1	(Serbia) Red Star Belgrade	3–0	1–1
IFK Göteborg (Sweden)	1–3	(Azerbaijan) Qarabağ	1–0	0–3
Maccabi Tel Aviv (Israel)	3–3 (4–3 p)	(Croatia) Hajduk Split	2–1	1–2 (a.e.t.)

== Statistics ==
There were 626 goals scored in 263 matches in the qualifying phase and play-off round, for an average of 2.38 goals per match.

=== Top goalscorers ===
Rank	Player	Team	Goals	Minutes played
1	(Finland) Teemu Pukki	(Denmark) Brøndby	6	613
1	(Croatia) Mirko Marić	(Croatia) Lokomotiva Zagreb	6	661
1	(North Macedonia) Ivan Tričkovski	(Cyprus) AEK Larnaca	6	695
4	(Mali) Kalifa Coulibaly	(Belgium) Gent	5	255
4	(Italy) Domenico Berardi	(Italy) Sassuolo	5	303
4	(Liberia) Theo Lewis Weeks	(Azerbaijan) Gabala	5	695

=== Top assists ===
Rank	Player	Team	Assists	Minutes played
1	(Denmark) Andrew Hjulsager	(Denmark) Brøndby	5	700
2	(Bosnia and Herzegovina) Haris Medunjanin	(Israel) Maccabi Tel Aviv	4	728
2	(Denmark) Rasmus Nissen	(Denmark) Midtjylland	4	750
