= 2016–17 UEFA Europa League qualifying (first and second round matches) =

European football competition

This page summarises the matches of the first and second qualifying rounds of 2016–17 UEFA Europa League qualifying.

Times are CEST (UTC+2), as listed by UEFA (local times, if different, are in parentheses).

== First qualifying round ==
=== Summary ===
The first legs were played on 28 and 30 June, and the second legs were played on 5, 6 and 7 July 2016.

Team 1	Agg.	Team 2	1st leg	2nd leg
Midtjylland (Denmark)	2–0	(Lithuania) Sūduva	1–0	1–0
Heart of Midlothian (Scotland)	6–3 (Note: Order of legs reversed after original draw.)	(Estonia) Infonet Tallinn	2–1	4–2
Connah's Quay Nomads (Wales)	1–0	(Norway) Stabæk	0–0	1–0
Ventspils (Latvia)	4–0	(Faroe Islands) Víkingur Gøta	2–0	2–0
Linfield (Northern Ireland)	1–2	(Republic of Ireland) Cork City	0–1	1–1
Levadia Tallinn (Estonia)	3–1	(Faroe Islands) HB	1–1	2–0
Atlantas (Lithuania)	1–3	(Finland) HJK	0–2	1–1
IFK Göteborg (Sweden)	7–1	(Wales) Llandudno	5–0	2–1
St Patrick's Athletic (Republic of Ireland)	2–2 (a)	(Luxembourg) Jeunesse Esch	1–0	1–2
KR (Iceland)	8–1	(Northern Ireland) Glenavon	2–1	6–0
Shamrock Rovers (Republic of Ireland)	1–3	(Finland) RoPS	0–2	1–1
Valur (Iceland)	1–10	(Denmark) Brøndby	1–4	0–6
Aberdeen (Scotland)	3–2	(Luxembourg) Fola Esch	3–1	0–1
Trakai (Lithuania)	3–5	(Estonia) Nõmme Kalju	2–1	1–4
Dinamo Minsk (Belarus)	4–1	(Latvia) Spartaks Jūrmala	2–1	2–0
Breiðablik (Iceland)	4–5	(Latvia) Jelgava	2–3	2–2
NSÍ (Faroe Islands)	0–7	(Belarus) Shakhtyor Soligorsk	0–2	0–5
AIK (Sweden)	4–0	(Wales) Bala Town	2–0	2–0
Differdange 03 (Luxembourg)	1–3	(Northern Ireland) Cliftonville	1–1	0–2
Odd (Norway)	3–1	(Finland) Mariehamn	2–0	1–1
Domžale (Slovenia)	5–2	(Andorra) Lusitanos	3–1	2–1
Bokelj (Montenegro)	1–6	(Serbia) Vojvodina	1–1	0–5
AEK Larnaca (Cyprus)	6–1	(San Marino) Folgore	3–0	3–1
Dila Gori (Georgia (country))	1–1 (1–4 p)	(Armenia) Shirak	1–0	0–1 (a.e.t.)
Široki Brijeg (Bosnia and Herzegovina)	1–3	(Malta) Birkirkara	1–1	0–2
Videoton (Hungary)	3–2	(Moldova) Zaria Bălți	3–0	0–2
UE Santa Coloma (Andorra)	2–7	(Croatia) Lokomotiva Zagreb	1–3	1–4
Europa (Gibraltar)	3–2	(Armenia) Pyunik	2–0	1–2
Čukarički (Serbia)	6–3	(Kazakhstan) Ordabasy	3–0	3–3
Rabotnicki (North Macedonia)	1–2	(Montenegro) Budućnost Podgorica	1–1	0–1
Zimbru Chișinău (Moldova)	3–3 (a)	(Georgia (country)) Chikhura Sachkhere	0–1	3–2
Sloboda Tuzla (Bosnia and Herzegovina)	0–1	(Israel) Beitar Jerusalem	0–0	0–1
Kukësi (Albania)	2–1	(Montenegro) Rudar Pljevlja	1–1	1–0
Balzan (Malta)	2–3	(Azerbaijan) Neftçi	0–2	2–1
Admira Wacker Mödling (Austria)	4–3	(Slovakia) Spartak Myjava	1–1	3–2
Beroe Stara Zagora (Bulgaria)	2–0	(Bosnia and Herzegovina) Radnik Bijeljina	0–0	2–0
La Fiorita (San Marino)	0–7	(Hungary) Debrecen	0–5	0–2
Vaduz (Liechtenstein)	5–2	(North Macedonia) Sileks	3–1	2–1
Maccabi Tel Aviv (Israel)	4–0	(Slovenia) Gorica	3–0	1–0
Gabala (Azerbaijan)	6–3	(Georgia (country)) Samtredia	5–1	1–2
Teuta (Albania)	0–6	(Kazakhstan) Kairat	0–1	0–5
Spartak Trnava (Slovakia)	6–0	(Malta) Hibernians	3–0	3–0
Banants (Armenia)	1–5	(Cyprus) Omonia	0–1	1–4 (a.e.t.)
Shkëndija (North Macedonia)	4–1	(Poland) Cracovia	2–0	2–1
Slavia Sofia (Bulgaria)	1–3	(Poland) Zagłębie Lubin	1–0	0–3
Aktobe (Kazakhstan)	1–3	(Hungary) MTK Budapest	1–1	0–2
Partizani (Albania)	w/o (Note: Partizani replaced Skënderbeu in the 2016–17 UEFA Champions League second qualifying round and Slovan Bratislava proceeded directly to the UEFA Europa League second qualifying round, after Skënderbeu was excluded by UEFA for match-fixing.)	(Slovakia) Slovan Bratislava	0–0	Canc.
Kapaz (Azerbaijan)	1–0	(Moldova) Dacia Chișinău	0–0	1–0

=== Matches ===
30 June 2016
19:00

Midtjylland (Denmark)	1–0	(Lithuania) Sūduva
Onuachu 56'	Report

MCH Arena, Herning
Attendance: 4,347
Referee: Srđan Jovanović (Serbia)
7 July 2016
19:00

Sūduva (Lithuania)	0–1	(Denmark) Midtjylland
	Report	Novák 16'

Sūduva Stadium, Marijampolė
Attendance: 1,738
Referee: Peter Kralović (Slovakia)

Midtjylland won 2–0 on aggregate.

30 June 2016
21:00

Heart of Midlothian (Scotland)	2–1	(Estonia) Infonet Tallinn
Buaben 28' (pen.); Kalimullin 36' (o.g.)	Report	Kharin 21'

Tynecastle Stadium, Edinburgh
Attendance: 14,417
Referee: Vilhjálmur Alvar Þórarinsson (Iceland)
6 July 2016
17:45

Infonet Tallinn (Estonia)	2–4	(Scotland) Heart of Midlothian
Kharin 51'; Voskoboinikov 63'	Report	Paterson 2'; Rossi 9', 52'; Öztürk 45+1'

A. Le Coq Arena, Tallinn (Note: Infonet Tallinn played their home match at A. Le Coq Arena, Tallinn, instead of their regular stadium Lasnamäe KJH Stadium, Tallinn.)
Attendance: 1,354
Referee: Petr Ardeleanu (Czech Republic)

Heart of Midlothian won 6–3 on aggregate.

30 June 2016
20:15

Connah's Quay Nomads (Wales)	0–0	(Norway) Stabæk
	Report

Belle Vue, Rhyl (Note: Connah's Quay Nomads played their home matches at Belle Vue, Rhyl, instead of their regular stadium Deeside Stadium, Connah's Quay.)
Attendance: 573
Referee: Johnny Casanova (San Marino)
7 July 2016
19:00

Stabæk (Norway)	0–1	(Wales) Connah's Quay Nomads
	Report	Morris 15'

Fredrikstad Stadion, Fredrikstad (Note: Stabæk played their home match at Fredrikstad Stadion, Fredrikstad, instead of their regular stadium Nadderud Stadion, Bærum.)
Attendance: 384
Referee: Laurent Kopriwa (Luxembourg)

Connah's Quay Nomads won 1–0 on aggregate.

30 June 2016
17:00

Ventspils (Latvia)	2–0	(Faroe Islands) Víkingur Gøta
Karlsons 5', 37'	Report

Olimpiskais Stadions, Ventspils
Attendance: 1,982
Referee: Mikhail Vilkov (Russia)
7 July 2016
20:00

Víkingur Gøta (Faroe Islands)	0–2	(Latvia) Ventspils
	Report	Jemeļins 57' (pen.); Karlsons 90+2'

Svangaskarð, Toftir (Note: Víkingur Gøta played their home match at Svangaskarð, Toftir, instead of their regular stadium Sarpugerði, Norðragøta.)
Attendance: 369
Referee: Nikolaj Hänni (Switzerland)

Ventspils won 4–0 on aggregate.

30 June 2016
20:45

Linfield (Northern Ireland)	0–1	(Republic of Ireland) Cork City
	Report	Maguire 63' (pen.)

Windsor Park, Belfast
Attendance: 2,093
Referee: Bart Vertenten (Belgium)
7 July 2016
20:45

Cork City (Republic of Ireland)	1–1	(Northern Ireland) Linfield
Maguire 49' (pen.)	Report	Stafford 52'

Turners Cross, Cork
Attendance: 3,521
Referee: Bartosz Frankowski (Poland)

Cork City won 2–1 on aggregate.

30 June 2016
18:00

Levadia Tallinn (Estonia)	1–1	(Faroe Islands) HB
Marin 65'	Report	Manga 21' (o.g.)

Kadriorg Stadium, Tallinn
Attendance: 730
Referee: Filip Glova (Slovakia)
7 July 2016
17:00

HB (Faroe Islands)	0–2	(Estonia) Levadia Tallinn
	Report	Kobzar 71'; Miranchuk 90+2'

Gundadalur, Tórshavn
Attendance: 580
Referee: Radek Příhoda (Czech Republic)

Levadia Tallinn won 3–1 on aggregate.

30 June 2016
18:00

Atlantas (Lithuania)	0–2	(Finland) HJK
	Report	Morelos 53', 85'

Central Stadium, Klaipėda
Attendance: 2,500
Referee: Alexandros Aretopoulos (Greece)
7 July 2016
18:00

HJK (Finland)	1–1	(Lithuania) Atlantas
Taiwo 30' (pen.)	Report	Papšys 76'

Sonera Stadium, Helsinki
Attendance: 3,501
Referee: Bryn Markham-Jones (Wales)

HJK won 3–1 on aggregate.

30 June 2016
18:30

IFK Göteborg (Sweden)	5–0	(Wales) Llandudno
Engvall 11'; Rieks 12'; Salomonsson 36'; Hysén 79', 81'	Report

Gamla Ullevi, Gothenburg
Attendance: 6,074
Referee: Martin Lundby (Norway)
7 July 2016
20:00

Llandudno (Wales)	1–2	(Sweden) IFK Göteborg
Hughes 72'	Report	Smedberg-Dalence 36'; Sköld 54'

Nantporth, Bangor (Note: Llandudno played their home match at Nantporth, Bangor, instead of their regular stadium Maesdu Park, Llandudno.)
Attendance: 841
Referee: Tiago Martins (Portugal)

IFK Göteborg won 7–1 on aggregate.

28 June 2016
20:45

St Patrick's Athletic (Republic of Ireland)	1–0	(Luxembourg) Jeunesse Esch
Fagan 10'	Report

Richmond Park, Dublin
Attendance: 1,200
Referee: Pavel Orel (Czech Republic)
5 July 2016
18:45

Jeunesse Esch (Luxembourg)	2–1	(Republic of Ireland) St Patrick's Athletic
Stumpf 22', 87'	Report	D. Dennehy 73'

Stade de la Frontière, Esch-sur-Alzette
Attendance: 1,378
Referee: Irfan Peljto (Bosnia and Herzegovina)

2–2 on aggregate; St Patrick's Athletic won on away goals.

30 June 2016
21:15

KR (Iceland)	2–1	(Northern Ireland) Glenavon
Pálmason 40'; Friðjónsson 78' (pen.)	Report	Kelly 14'

KR-völlur, Reykjavík
Attendance: 502
Referee: Nicolas Laforge (Belgium)
7 July 2016
20:45

Glenavon (Northern Ireland)	0–6	(Iceland) KR
	Report	Chopart 6', 29'; Friðjónsson 53' (pen.); Andersen 68'; Hauksson 78'; Fazlagic 80'

Mourneview Park, Lurgan
Attendance: 1,250
Referee: Dennis Antamo (Finland)

KR won 8–1 on aggregate.

30 June 2016
21:00

Shamrock Rovers (Republic of Ireland)	0–2	(Finland) RoPS
	Report	Lahdenmäki 27'; Saksela 74'

Tallaght Stadium, Tallaght
Attendance: 1,908
Referee: Georgios Kominis (Greece)
7 July 2016
18:00

RoPS (Finland)	1–1	(Republic of Ireland) Shamrock Rovers
Muinonen 27'	Report	McCabe 22' (pen.)

Keskuskenttä, Rovaniemi
Attendance: 1,525
Referee: Dejan Jakimovski (Macedonia)

RoPS won 3–1 on aggregate.

30 June 2016
23:00

Valur (Iceland)	1–4	(Denmark) Brøndby
Ingvarsson 90+2'	Report	Wilczek 47', 54'; Pukki 61'; Jakobsen 79'

Hlíðarendi, Reykjavík
Attendance: 728
Referee: Ali Palabıyık (Turkey)
7 July 2016
18:30

Brøndby (Denmark)	6–0	(Iceland) Valur
Wilczek 5'; Hjulsager 15'; Pukki 26', 57'; Stückler 71', 90+3'	Report

Brøndby Stadium, Brøndbyvester
Attendance: 6,227
Referee: Tihomir Pejin (Croatia)

Brøndby won 10–1 on aggregate.

30 June 2016
20:45

Aberdeen (Scotland)	3–1	(Luxembourg) Fola Esch
Logan 68'; McGinn 90+3'; Rooney 90+8' (pen.)	Report	Klein 70'

Pittodrie Stadium, Aberdeen
Attendance: 12,570
Referee: Mads-Kristoffer Kristoffersen (Denmark)
7 July 2016
18:30

Fola Esch (Luxembourg)	1–0	(Scotland) Aberdeen
Hadji 45'	Report

Stade Josy Barthel, Luxembourg City (Note: Fola Esch played their home match at Stade Josy Barthel, Luxembourg City, instead of their regular stadium Stade Émile Mayrisch, Esch-sur-Alzette.)
Attendance: 1,789
Referee: Ola Hobber Nilsen (Norway)

Aberdeen won 3–2 on aggregate.

30 June 2016
18:00

Trakai (Lithuania)	2–1	(Estonia) Nõmme Kalju
Valskis 69'; Arshakyan 78'	Report	Wakui 6' (pen.)

LFF Stadium, Vilnius
Attendance: 500
Referee: Vladimir Vnuk (Slovakia)
7 July 2016
18:00

Nõmme Kalju (Estonia)	4–1	(Lithuania) Trakai
Rodrigues 66'; Sidorenkov 69'; Neemelo 87', 90+2'	Report	Arshakyan 14'

Kadriorg Stadium, Tallinn (Note: Nõmme Kalju played their home matches at Kadriorg Stadium, Tallinn, instead of their regular stadium Hiiu Stadium, Tallinn.)
Attendance: 465
Referee: Erik Lambrechts (Belgium)

Nõmme Kalju won 5–3 on aggregate.

30 June 2016
18:00

Dinamo Minsk (Belarus)	2–1	(Latvia) Spartaks Jūrmala
Bykov 18', 82'	Report	Ulimbaševs 80'

Traktor Stadium, Minsk
Attendance: 1,700
Referee: Zaven Hovhannisyan (Armenia)
7 July 2016
18:00

Spartaks Jūrmala (Latvia)	0–2	(Belarus) Dinamo Minsk
	Report	Khvashchynski 11'; El-Monir 90+1'

Slokas Stadium, Jūrmala
Attendance: 1,100
Referee: Alexandru Tean (Moldova)

Dinamo Minsk won 4–1 on aggregate.

30 June 2016
21:15

Breiðablik (Iceland)	2–3	(Latvia) Jelgava
Bamberg 13'; Sigurjónsson 90+6'	Report	Kļuškins 10'; Redjko 33'; Grigaravičius 44'

Kópavogsvöllur, Kópavogur
Attendance: 531
Referee: Anders Poulsen (Denmark)
7 July 2016
17:30

Jelgava (Latvia)	2–2	(Iceland) Breiðablik
Turkovs 15'; Diallo 70'	Report	Hreinsson 31'; Bamberg 33' (pen.)

Olympic Sports Center of Zemgale, Jelgava
Attendance: 1,560
Referee: Petur Reinert (Faroe Islands)

Jelgava won 5–4 on aggregate.

30 June 2016
20:00

NSÍ (Faroe Islands)	0–2	(Belarus) Shakhtyor Soligorsk
	Report	Starhorodskyi 45+1' (pen.), 84' (pen.)

Svangaskarð, Toftir (Note: NSÍ Runavík played their home match at Svangaskarð, Toftir, instead of their regular stadium Runavík Stadium, Runavík.)
Attendance: 350
Referee: Tim Marshall (Northern Ireland)
7 July 2016
20:00

Shakhtyor Soligorsk (Belarus)	5–0	(Faroe Islands) NSÍ
Burko 20'; Rudyka 42'; Shibun 81' (pen.); Yelezarenko 86'; Yanushkevich 90'	Report

Stroitel Stadium, Salihorsk
Attendance: 1,100
Referee: Giorgi Vadachkoria (Georgia)

Shakhtyor Soligorsk won 7–0 on aggregate.

30 June 2016
18:30

AIK (Sweden)	2–0	(Wales) Bala Town
Affane 27'; Johansson 52'	Report

Tele2 Arena, Stockholm (Note: AIK played their first and third qualifying rounds home matches at Tele2 Arena, Stockholm, instead of their regular stadium Friends Arena, Solna.)
Attendance: 6,127
Referee: Kirill Levnikov (Russia)
7 July 2016
19:30

Bala Town (Wales)	0–2	(Sweden) AIK
	Report	Avdić 8'; Strandberg 24'

Belle Vue, Rhyl (Note: Bala Town played their home match at Belle Vue, Rhyl, instead of their regular stadium Maes Tegid, Bala.)
Attendance: 890
Referee: Fedayi San (Switzerland)

AIK won 4–0 on aggregate.

30 June 2016
19:00

Differdange 03 (Luxembourg)	1–1	(Northern Ireland) Cliftonville
Er Rafik 38'	Report	Lavery 89'

Stade Municipal, Differdange
Attendance: 1,355
Referee: Ignasi Villamayor Rozados (Andorra)
7 July 2016
20:45

Cliftonville (Northern Ireland)	2–0	(Luxembourg) Differdange 03
McDaid 2'; J. Donnelly 75'	Report

Solitude, Belfast
Attendance: 1,168
Referee: Ferenc Karakó (Hungary)

Cliftonville won 3–1 on aggregate.

30 June 2016
19:00

Odd (Norway)	2–0	(Finland) Mariehamn
Grøgaard 63'; Occéan 86'	Report

Skagerak Arena, Skien
Attendance: 3,701
Referee: Mohammed Al-Hakim (Sweden)
7 July 2016
18:00

Mariehamn (Finland)	1–1	(Norway) Odd
Mantilla 4'	Report	Bentley 78'

Wiklöf Holding Arena, Mariehamn
Attendance: 1,402
Referee: Peter Kjærsgaard-Andersen (Denmark)

Odd won 3–1 on aggregate.

30 June 2016
20:00

Domžale (Slovenia)	3–1	(Andorra) Lusitanos
Dobrovoljc 11'; Horić 26'; Črnic 43'	Report	Luizão 5'

Sports Park, Domžale
Attendance: 1,000
Referee: Orkhan Mammadov (Azerbaijan)
7 July 2016
20:30

Lusitanos (Andorra)	1–2	(Slovenia) Domžale
Luizão 18'	Report	Majer 5'; Morel 42'

Estadi Comunal, Andorra la Vella
Attendance: 500
Referee: Stanislav Todorov (Bulgaria)

Domžale won 5–2 on aggregate.

30 June 2016
17:30

Bokelj (Montenegro)	1–1	(Serbia) Vojvodina
Đenić 5'	Report	Meleg 6'

Stadion pod Malim brdom, Petrovac (Note: Bokelj played their home match at Stadion pod Malim brdom, Petrovac, instead of their regular stadium Stadion pod Vrmcem, Kotor.)
Attendance: 1,403
Referee: Alejandro Hernández Hernández (Spain)
7 July 2016
20:00

Vojvodina (Serbia)	5–0	(Montenegro) Bokelj
Malbašić 9', 42'; Meleg 60'; Trujić 63', 87'	Report

Karađorđe Stadium, Novi Sad
Attendance: 4,388
Referee: Andrew Dallas (Scotland)

Vojvodina won 6–1 on aggregate.

30 June 2016
19:00

AEK Larnaca (Cyprus)	3–0	(San Marino) Folgore
Tričkovski 22', 34'; Alves 31'	Report

Antonis Papadopoulos Stadium, Larnaca (Note: AEK Larnaca played their home matches at Antonis Papadopoulos Stadium, Larnaca, instead of their regular stadium GSZ Stadium, Larnaca.)
Attendance: 2,100
Referee: Aleksandrs Golubevs (Latvia)
7 July 2016
20:30

Folgore (San Marino)	1–3	(Cyprus) AEK Larnaca
Traini 35'	Report	Tričkovski 51', 55'; Alves 65' (pen.)

San Marino Stadium, Serravalle
Attendance: 319
Referee: Jens Maae (Denmark)

AEK Larnaca won 6–1 on aggregate.

30 June 2016
16:00

Dila Gori (Georgia (country))	1–0	(Armenia) Shirak
Modebadze 36'	Report

Tengiz Burjanadze Stadium, Gori
Attendance: 2,512
Referee: Anatoliy Zhabchenko (Ukraine)
7 July 2016
15:00

Shirak (Armenia)	1–0 (a.e.t.)	(Georgia (country)) Dila Gori
Bichakhchyan 84'	Report
Penalties
Hovsepyan (penalty scored); Darbinyan (penalty scored); Ayvazyan (penalty scored); Hakobyan (penalty scored)	4–1	(penalty missed) Gongadze; (penalty missed) Kvirkvelia; (penalty scored) Razmadze

City Stadium, Gyumri
Attendance: 2,400
Referee: Sergejus Slyva (Lithuania)

1–1 on aggregate; Shirak won 4–1 on penalties.

30 June 2016
19:00

Široki Brijeg (Bosnia and Herzegovina)	1–1	(Malta) Birkirkara
Baraban 45'	Report	Attard 15'

Stadion Pecara, Široki Brijeg
Attendance: 3,000
Referee: Sandro Schärer (Switzerland)
5 July 2016
17:45

Birkirkara (Malta)	2–0	(Bosnia and Herzegovina) Široki Brijeg
Dimitrov 29'; Marković 76' (o.g.)	Report

Hibernians Stadium, Paola (Note: Birkirkara played their home matches at Hibernians Stadium, Paola, instead of their regular stadium National Stadium, Ta' Qali.)
Attendance: 1,152
Referee: Rahim Hasanov (Azerbaijan)

Birkirkara won 3–1 on aggregate.

30 June 2016
18:00

Videoton (Hungary)	3–0	(Moldova) Zaria Bălți
Géresi 18'; Feczesin 88', 90+4'	Report

Pancho Arena, Felcsút (Note: Videoton played their home matches at Pancho Arena, Felcsút, instead of their regular stadium Sóstói Stadion, Székesfehérvár, due to reconstruction.)
Attendance: 2,321
Referee: Enea Jorgji (Albania)
7 July 2016
19:00

Zaria Bălți (Moldova)	2–0	(Hungary) Videoton
Mihaliov 9'; Ovseanicov 29'	Report

Zimbru Stadium, Chișinău (Note: Zaria Bălți played their home match at Zimbru Stadium, Chișinău, instead of their regular stadium Stadionul Orășenesc, Bălți.)
Attendance: 2,097
Referee: Fyodor Zammit (Malta)

Videoton won 3–2 on aggregate.

30 June 2016
17:00

UE Santa Coloma (Andorra)	1–3	(Croatia) Lokomotiva Zagreb
Reis 90+3'	Report	Marić 20', 73'; Prenga 65'

Estadi Comunal, Andorra la Vella
Attendance: 250
Referee: Donatas Rumšas (Lithuania)
7 July 2016
18:00

Lokomotiva Zagreb (Croatia)	4–1	(Andorra) UE Santa Coloma
Ćorić 8'; Prenga 18' (pen.); Marić 48'; Perić 57'	Report	Salomó 89'

Stadion Kranjčevićeva, Zagreb
Attendance: 294
Referee: Veaceslav Banari (Moldova)

Lokomotiva Zagreb won 7–2 on aggregate.

30 June 2016
18:30

Europa (Gibraltar)	2–0	(Armenia) Pyunik
Carrión 32'; López 39'	Report

Victoria Stadium, Gibraltar
Attendance: 850
Referee: Markus Hameter (Austria)
7 July 2016
17:00

Pyunik (Armenia)	2–1	(Gibraltar) Europa
Arakelyan 25'; Ra. Hakobyan 56'	Report	Joselinho 10'

Vazgen Sargsyan Republican Stadium, Yerevan (Note: Pyunik played their home match at Vazgen Sargsyan Republican Stadium, Yerevan, instead of their regular stadium Football Academy Stadium, Yerevan.)
Attendance: 2,000
Referee: Boris Marhefka (Slovakia)

Europa won 3–2 on aggregate.

30 June 2016
20:30

Čukarički (Serbia)	3–0	(Kazakhstan) Ordabasy
Matić 49' (pen.), 68'; Kajević 53'	Report

Čukarički Stadium, Belgrade
Attendance: 2,214
Referee: Fábio Veríssimo (Portugal)
7 July 2016
14:00

Ordabasy (Kazakhstan)	3–3	(Serbia) Čukarički
Geynrikh 45+2'; Tunggyshbayev 67'; Yerlanov 90+3'	Report	Mandić 10', 14'; Kajević 21'

Kazhymukan Munaitpasov Stadium, Shymkent
Attendance: 5,100
Referee: Denis Scherbakov (Belarus)

Čukarički won 6–3 on aggregate.

28 June 2016
18:00

Rabotnicki (North Macedonia)	1–1	(Montenegro) Budućnost Podgorica
Elmas 80'	Report	Janketić 36'

Philip II Arena, Skopje
Attendance: 1,500
Referee: Zbyněk Proske (Czech Republic)
7 July 2016
19:00

Budućnost Podgorica (Montenegro)	1–0	(North Macedonia) Rabotnicki
Radunović 18' (pen.)	Report

City Stadium, Podgorica
Attendance: 2,000
Referee: Jørgen Daugbjerg Burchardt (Denmark)

Budućnost Podgorica won 2–1 on aggregate.

30 June 2016
19:00

Zimbru Chișinău (Moldova)	0–1	(Georgia (country)) Chikhura Sachkhere
	Report	Tatanashvili 39'

Zimbru Stadium, Chișinău
Attendance: 2,500
Referee: Jari Järvinen (Finland)
5 July 2016
18:00

Chikhura Sachkhere (Georgia (country))	2–3	(Moldova) Zimbru Chișinău
Ivanishvili 13'; Kakubava 55'	Report	Emerson 45+2', 90+3'; Jardan 61'

David Abashidze Stadium, Zestaponi (Note: Chikhura Sachkhere played their home match at David Abashidze Stadium, Zestaponi, instead of their regular stadium Central Stadium, Sachkhere.)
Attendance: 1,500
Referee: Suren Baliyan (Armenia)

3–3 on aggregate; Zimbru Chișinău won on away goals.

30 June 2016
18:00

Sloboda Tuzla (Bosnia and Herzegovina)	0–0	(Israel) Beitar Jerusalem
	Report

Bilino Polje Stadium, Zenica (Note: Sloboda Tuzla played their home match at Bilino Polje Stadium, Zenica, instead of their regular stadium Tušanj City Stadium, Tuzla.)
Attendance: 2,762
Referee: Glenn Nyberg (Sweden)
7 July 2016
18:45

Beitar Jerusalem (Israel)	1–0	(Bosnia and Herzegovina) Sloboda Tuzla
Atzili 66' (pen.)	Report

Teddy Stadium, Jerusalem
Attendance: 9,010
Referee: Oleksandr Derdo (Ukraine)

Beitar Jerusalem won 1–0 on aggregate.

30 June 2016
19:00

Kukësi (Albania)	1–1	(Montenegro) Rudar Pljevlja
Rangel 32'	Report	Radanović 71' (pen.)

Elbasan Arena, Elbasan (Note: Kukësi played their home matches at Elbasan Arena, Elbasan, instead of their regular stadium Zeqir Ymeri Stadium, Kukës.)
Attendance: 104
Referee: Roi Reinschreiber (Israel)
7 July 2016
17:30

Rudar Pljevlja (Montenegro)	0–1	(Albania) Kukësi
	Report	Guri 79'

City Stadium, Nikšić (Note: Rudar Pljevlja played their home match at City Stadium, Nikšić, instead of their regular stadium City Stadium, Pljevlja.)
Attendance: 486
Referee: João Capela (Portugal)

Kukësi won 2–1 on aggregate.

30 June 2016
18:00

Balzan (Malta)	0–2	(Azerbaijan) Neftçi
	Report	Hajiyev 14'; R. Qurbanov 84' (pen.)

Hibernians Stadium, Paola (Note: Balzan played their home match at Hibernians Stadium, Paola, instead of their regular stadium National Stadium, Ta' Qali.)
Attendance: 357
Referee: Jovan Kaluđerović (Montenegro)
7 July 2016
18:00

Neftçi (Azerbaijan)	1–2	(Malta) Balzan
Jairo 20'	Report	Micallef 51', 67'

Bakcell Arena, Baku
Attendance: 7,650
Referee: Yaroslav Kozyk (Ukraine)

Neftçi won 3–2 on aggregate.

30 June 2016
17:00

Admira Wacker Mödling (Austria)	1–1	(Slovakia) Spartak Myjava
Bajrami 34'	Report	Kóňa 73'

NV Arena, Sankt Pölten (Note: Admira Wacker Mödling played their first and second qualifying round home matches at NV Arena, Sankt Pölten, instead of their regular stadium Bundesstadion Südstadt, Maria Enzersdorf.)
Attendance: 1,200
Referee: Fran Jović (Croatia)
7 July 2016
17:00

Spartak Myjava (Slovakia)	2–3	(Austria) Admira Wacker Mödling
Daniel 30'; Pekár 89'	Report	Wostry 2'; Starkl 27'; Zwierschitz 57'

Stadium Myjava, Myjava
Attendance: 2,057
Referee: Alper Ulusoy (Turkey)

Admira Wacker Mödling won 4–3 on aggregate.

30 June 2016
19:30

Beroe Stara Zagora (Bulgaria)	0–0	(Bosnia and Herzegovina) Radnik Bijeljina
	Report

Beroe Stadium, Stara Zagora
Attendance: 2,918
Referee: Giorgi Kruashvili (Georgia)
7 July 2016
18:00

Radnik Bijeljina (Bosnia and Herzegovina)	0–2	(Bulgaria) Beroe Stara Zagora
	Report	Pochanski 79', 80'

City Stadium, Banja Luka (Note: Radnik Bijeljina played their home match at City Stadium, Banja Luka, instead of their regular stadium City Stadium, Bijeljina.)
Attendance: 2,832
Referee: Dimitrios Massias (Cyprus)

Beroe Stara Zagora won 2–0 on aggregate.

30 June 2016
20:30

La Fiorita (San Marino)	0–5	(Hungary) Debrecen
	Report	Szakály 5', 83'; Tisza 34', 49'; Kulcsár 89'

San Marino Stadium, Serravalle
Attendance: 402
Referee: Juri Frischer (Estonia)
7 July 2016
18:00

Debrecen (Hungary)	2–0	(San Marino) La Fiorita
Tisza 41'; Holman 51'	Report

Nagyerdei Stadion, Debrecen
Attendance: 8,632
Referee: Stavros Mantalos (Greece)

Debrecen won 7–0 on aggregate.

30 June 2016
19:00

Vaduz (Liechtenstein)	3–1	(North Macedonia) Sileks
Costanzo 36', 45+2'; Grippo 90+5'	Report	Mickov 86'

Rheinpark Stadion, Vaduz
Attendance: 928
Referee: Þóroddur Hjaltalín Jr. (Iceland)
7 July 2016
20:00

Sileks (North Macedonia)	1–2	(Liechtenstein) Vaduz
Mickov 30'	Report	Costanzo 89' (pen.); Messaoud 90+3'

Philip II Arena, Skopje (Note: Sileks played their home match at Philip II Arena, Skopje, instead of their regular stadium City Stadium, Kratovo.)
Attendance: 450
Referee: Paul McLaughlin (Republic of Ireland)

Vaduz won 5–2 on aggregate.

30 June 2016
19:15

Maccabi Tel Aviv (Israel)	3–0	(Slovenia) Gorica
Igiebor 13', 69'; Sá 45'	Report

Netanya Stadium, Netanya (Note: Maccabi Tel Aviv played their home matches at Netanya Stadium, Netanya, instead of their regular stadium Bloomfield Stadium, Tel Aviv, due to reconstruction.)
Attendance: 7,982
Referee: Jonathan Lardot (Belgium)
7 July 2016
18:30

Gorica (Slovenia)	0–1	(Israel) Maccabi Tel Aviv
	Report	Benayoun 10'

Sports Park, Nova Gorica
Attendance: 700
Referee: Manuel Schüttengruber (Austria)

Maccabi Tel Aviv won 4–0 on aggregate.

30 June 2016
19:00

Gabala (Azerbaijan)	5–1	(Georgia (country)) Samtredia
Stanković 16'; Zenjov 19'; Weeks 30', 69', 72'	Report	Shergelashvili 59'

Bakcell Arena, Baku (Note: Gabala played their home matches at Bakcell Arena, Baku, instead of their regular stadium City Stadium, Qabala.)
Attendance: 5,850
Referee: Denis Scherbakov (Belarus)
7 July 2016
17:00

Samtredia (Georgia (country))	2–1	(Azerbaijan) Gabala
Zivzivadze 14' (pen.); Shergelashvili 90+2'	Report	Weeks 42'

David Abashidze Stadium, Zestaponi (Note: Samtredia played their home match at David Abashidze Stadium, Zestaponi, instead of their regular stadium Erosi Manjgaladze Stadium, Samtredia.)
Attendance: 847
Referee: Georgios Kyzas (Greece)

Gabala won 6–3 on aggregate.

30 June 2016
20:00

Teuta (Albania)	0–1	(Kazakhstan) Kairat
	Report	Arshavin 70'

Niko Dovana Stadium, Durrës
Attendance: 500
Referee: Vasilis Dimitriou (Cyprus)
7 July 2016
16:45

Kairat (Kazakhstan)	5–0	(Albania) Teuta
Gohou 27', 61'; Bakayev 45+2'; Tawamba 72'; Turysbek 79'	Report

Central Stadium, Almaty
Attendance: 20,700
Referee: Dag Vidar Hafsås (Norway)

Kairat won 6–0 on aggregate.

30 June 2016
20:15

Spartak Trnava (Slovakia)	3–0	(Malta) Hibernians
Tambe 7', 83'; Mikovič 40'	Report

Štadión Antona Malatinského, Trnava
Attendance: 0 (Note: The Spartak Trnava v Hibernians match was played behind closed doors due to punishment by UEFA.)
Referee: Edin Jakupović (Bosnia and Herzegovina)
7 July 2016
20:00

Hibernians (Malta)	0–3	(Slovakia) Spartak Trnava
	Report	Mikovič 5'; Oravec 58'; Bello 90+2'

Hibernians Stadium, Paola
Attendance: 322
Referee: Anastasios Papapetrou (Greece)

Spartak Trnava won 6–0 on aggregate.

30 June 2016
18:00

Banants (Armenia)	0–1	(Cyprus) Omonia
	Report	Derbyshire 26'

Vazgen Sargsyan Republican Stadium, Yerevan (Note: Banants played their home match at Vazgen Sargsyan Republican Stadium, Yerevan, instead of their regular stadium Banants Stadium, Yerevan.)
Attendance: 1,520
Referee: Mario Zebec (Croatia)
7 July 2016
18:30

Omonia (Cyprus)	4–1 (a.e.t.)	(Armenia) Banants
Roushias 93', 108'; Derbyshire 114'; Cleyton 120+1'	Report	Burayev 71'

GSP Stadium, Nicosia
Attendance: 8,042
Referee: Aleksandrs Anufrijevs (Latvia)

Omonia won 5–1 on aggregate.

30 June 2016
21:00

Shkëndija (North Macedonia)	2–0	(Poland) Cracovia
Ibraimi 41'; Stênio Júnior 68'	Report

Philip II Arena, Skopje (Note: Shkëndija played their home matches at Philip II Arena, Skopje, instead of their regular stadium City Stadium, Tetovo.)
Attendance: 4,539
Referee: Sándor Andó-Szabó (Hungary)
7 July 2016
20:00

Cracovia (Poland)	1–2	(North Macedonia) Shkëndija
Demiri 68' (o.g.)	Report	Ibraimi 13'; Hasani 90+3'

Józef Piłsudski Cracovia Stadium, Kraków
Attendance: 7,122
Referee: Gunnar Jarl Jónsson (Iceland)

Shkëndija won 4–1 on aggregate.

30 June 2016
18:30

Slavia Sofia (Bulgaria)	1–0	(Poland) Zagłębie Lubin
Serderov 85'	Report

Vasil Levski National Stadium, Sofia (Note: Slavia Sofia played their home match at Vasil Levski National Stadium, Sofia, instead of their regular stadium Ovcha Kupel Stadium, Sofia.)
Attendance: 1,160
Referee: Aliyar Aghayev (Azerbaijan)
7 July 2016
18:00

Zagłębie Lubin (Poland)	3–0	(Bulgaria) Slavia Sofia
Guldan 20'; Ł. Piątek 64'; Dąbrowski 81'	Report

Stadion Zagłębia Lubin, Lubin
Attendance: 5,817
Referee: Yuriy Mozharovsky (Ukraine)

Zagłębie Lubin won 3–1 on aggregate.

30 June 2016
16:00

Aktobe (Kazakhstan)	1–1	(Hungary) MTK Budapest
Zhalmukan 44' (pen.)	Report	Torghelle 30'

Central Stadium, Aktobe
Attendance: 8,600
Referee: Sascha Amhof (Switzerland)
7 July 2016
18:00

MTK Budapest (Hungary)	2–0	(Kazakhstan) Aktobe
Nikač 7'; Bese 84'	Report

Ménfői út, Győr (Note: MTK Budapest played their home matches at Ménfői út, Győr, instead of their temporary stadium Stadion Rudolf Illovszky, Budapest.)
Attendance: 601
Referee: Nikolay Yordanov (Bulgaria)

MTK Budapest won 3–1 on aggregate.

28 June 2016
18:00

Partizani (Albania)	0–0	(Slovakia) Slovan Bratislava
	Report

Elbasan Arena, Elbasan (Note: Partizani played their first qualifying and play-off rounds home matches at Elbasan Arena, Elbasan, instead of their regular stadium Selman Stërmasi Stadium, Tirana.)
Attendance: 1,350
Referee: Erez Papir (Israel)
7 July 2016
19:00

Slovan Bratislava (Slovakia)	Cancelled (Note: Partizani replaced Skënderbeu in the 2016–17 UEFA Champions League second qualifying round and Slovan Bratislava proceeded directly to the UEFA Europa League second qualifying round, after Skënderbeu was excluded by UEFA for match fixing.)	(Albania) Partizani
	Report

Štadión FK Senica, Senica (Note: Slovan Bratislava would have played their first qualifying round home match at Štadión FK Senica, Senica, instead of their regular stadium Štadión Pasienky, Bratislava.)
Referee: Mitja Žganec (Slovenia)

Slovan Bratislava won on walkover as Partizani were promoted to the Champions League.

28 June 2016
18:00

Kapaz (Azerbaijan)	0–0	(Moldova) Dacia Chișinău
	Report

Dalga Arena, Baku (Note: Kapaz played their home matches at Dalga Arena, Baku, instead of their regular stadium City Stadium, Ganja.)
Attendance: 2,000
Referee: Aleksandr Gauzer (Kazakhstan)
7 July 2016
17:00

Dacia Chișinău (Moldova)	0–1	(Azerbaijan) Kapaz
	Report	Dário 57'

Stadionul Moldova, Speia
Attendance: 620
Referee: Lasha Silagava (Georgia)

Kapaz won 1–0 on aggregate.

== Second qualifying round ==
=== Summary ===
The first legs were played on 14 July, and the second legs were played on 20 and 21 July 2016.

Team 1	Agg.	Team 2	1st leg	2nd leg
Shirak (Armenia)	1–3	(Slovakia) Spartak Trnava	1–1	0–2
Dinamo Minsk (Belarus)	2–1	(Republic of Ireland) St Patrick's Athletic	1–1	1–0
Partizan (Serbia)	0–0 (3–4 p)	(Poland) Zagłębie Lubin	0–0	0–0 (a.e.t.)
Vojvodina (Serbia)	3–1	(Wales) Connah's Quay Nomads	1–0	2–1
Maccabi Haifa (Israel)	2–2 (3–5 p) (Note: Order of legs reversed after original draw.)	(Estonia) Nõmme Kalju	1–1	1–1 (a.e.t.)
Hibernian (Scotland)	1–1 (3–5 p)	(Denmark) Brøndby	0–1	1–0 (a.e.t.)
Shakhtyor Soligorsk (Belarus)	2–3	(Slovenia) Domžale	1–1	1–2
Austria Wien	5–1	(Albania) Kukësi	1–0	4–1
MTK Budapest (Hungary)	1–4	(Azerbaijan) Gabala	1–2	0–2
Beroe Stara Zagora (Bulgaria)	1–2	(Finland) HJK	1–1	0–1
RoPS (Finland)	1–4	(Croatia) Lokomotiva Zagreb	1–1	0–3
Neftçi (Azerbaijan)	0–1	(North Macedonia) Shkëndija	0–0	0–1
KR (Iceland)	4–5	(Switzerland) Grasshopper	3–3	1–2
Midtjylland (Denmark)	5–2	(Liechtenstein) Vaduz	3–0	2–2
Zimbru Chișinău (Moldova)	2–7	(Turkey) Osmanlıspor	2–2	0–5
PAS Giannina (Greece)	4–3	(Norway) Odd	3–0	1–3 (a.e.t.)
Birkirkara (Malta)	2–1	(Scotland) Heart of Midlothian	0–0	2–1
Maribor (Slovenia)	1–1 (a)	(Bulgaria) Levski Sofia	0–0	1–1
Piast Gliwice (Poland)	0–3	(Sweden) IFK Göteborg	0–3	0–0
Slovan Bratislava (Slovakia)	0–3	(Latvia) Jelgava	0–0	0–3
Beitar Jerusalem (Israel)	3–3 (a)	(Cyprus) Omonia	1–0	2–3
Admira Wacker Mödling (Austria)	3–0	(Azerbaijan) Kapaz	1–0	2–0
Aberdeen (Scotland)	4–0	(Latvia) Ventspils	3–0	1–0
BK Häcken (Sweden)	1–2	(Republic of Ireland) Cork City	1–1	0–1
Kairat (Kazakhstan)	2–3	(Israel) Maccabi Tel Aviv	1–1	1–2
Debrecen (Hungary)	1–3	(Belarus) Torpedo-BelAZ Zhodino	1–2	0–1
CSM Politehnica Iași (Romania)	3–4	(Croatia) Hajduk Split	2–2	1–2
Videoton (Hungary)	3–1	(Serbia) Čukarički	2–0	1–1
Cliftonville (Northern Ireland)	2–5	(Cyprus) AEK Larnaca	2–3	0–2
AIK (Sweden)	2–0	(Gibraltar) Europa	1–0	1–0
Levadia Tallinn (Estonia)	3–3 (a)	(Czech Republic) Slavia Prague	3–1	0–2
Genk (Belgium)	2–2 (4–2 p)	(Montenegro) Budućnost Podgorica	2–0	0–2 (a.e.t.)
SønderjyskE (Denmark)	4–3	(Norway) Strømsgodset	2–1	2–2 (a.e.t.)

=== Matches ===
14 July 2016
15:00

Shirak (Armenia)	1–1	(Slovakia) Spartak Trnava
Hakobyan 16'	Report	Jirka 87'

City Stadium, Gyumri
Attendance: 2,747
Referee: Artyom Kuchin (Kazakhstan)
21 July 2016
20:15

Spartak Trnava (Slovakia)	2–0	(Armenia) Shirak
Schranz 57'; Tambe 61'	Report

Štadión Antona Malatinského, Trnava
Attendance: 6,129
Referee: Arnold Hunter (Northern Ireland)

Spartak Trnava won 3–1 on aggregate.

14 July 2016
17:30

Dinamo Minsk (Belarus)	1–1	(Republic of Ireland) St Patrick's Athletic
Karytska 25'	Report	Fagan 54'

Traktor Stadium, Minsk
Attendance: 1,286
Referee: Srđan Jovanović (Serbia)
21 July 2016
20:45

St Patrick's Athletic (Republic of Ireland)	0–1	(Belarus) Dinamo Minsk
	Report	Rassadkin 18'

Richmond Park, Dublin
Attendance: 2,400
Referee: Alan Mario Sant (Malta)

Dinamo Minsk won 2–1 on aggregate.

14 July 2016
20:15

Partizan (Serbia)	0–0	(Poland) Zagłębie Lubin
	Report

Partizan Stadium, Belgrade
Attendance: 15,870
Referee: Eitan Shemeulevitch (Israel)
21 July 2016
21:05

Zagłębie Lubin (Poland)	0–0 (a.e.t.)	(Serbia) Partizan
	Report
Penalties
Janus (penalty scored); Guldan (penalty scored); Todorovski (penalty missed); Woźniak (penalty scored); Vlasko (penalty scored)	4–3	(penalty missed) Brašanac; (penalty scored) Ilić; (penalty scored) Đuričković; (penalty scored) Janković; (penalty missed) Mihajlović

Stadion Zagłębia Lubin, Lubin
Attendance: 11,279
Referee: Anatoliy Abdula (Ukraine)

0–0 on aggregate; Zagłębie Lubin won 4–3 on penalties.

14 July 2016
20:00

Vojvodina (Serbia)	1–0	(Wales) Connah's Quay Nomads
Paločević 86'	Report

Karađorđe Stadium, Novi Sad
Attendance: 4,276
Referee: Aleksei Nikolaev (Russia)
21 July 2016
19:45

Connah's Quay Nomads (Wales)	1–2	(Serbia) Vojvodina
Wilde 65'	Report	Meleg 8', 49' (pen.)

Belle Vue, Rhyl
Attendance: 809
Referee: Peter Kralović (Slovakia)

Vojvodina won 3–1 on aggregate.

14 July 2016
19:00

Maccabi Haifa (Israel)	1–1	(Estonia) Nõmme Kalju
Vermouth 70'	Report	Toomet 47'

Netanya Stadium, Netanya (Note: Maccabi Haifa played their home match at Netanya Stadium, Netanya, instead of their regular stadium Sammy Ofer Stadium, Haifa.)
Attendance: 6,500
Referee: Svein-Erik Edvartsen (Norway)
21 July 2016
18:00

Nõmme Kalju (Estonia)	1–1 (a.e.t.)	(Israel) Maccabi Haifa
Neemelo 90'	Report	Rukavytsya 34' (pen.)
Penalties
Uggè (penalty scored); Sidorenkov (penalty scored); Purje (penalty scored); Wakui (penalty scored); Subbotin (penalty scored)	5–3	(penalty scored) Obraniak; (penalty scored) Rukavytsya; (penalty missed) Zenati; (penalty scored) Menachem

Kadriorg Stadium, Tallinn
Attendance: 2,273
Referee: Markus Hameter (Austria)

2–2 on aggregate; Nõmme Kalju won 5–3 on penalties.

14 July 2016
20:45

Hibernian (Scotland)	0–1	(Denmark) Brøndby
	Report	Wilczek 1'

Easter Road, Edinburgh
Attendance: 13,454
Referee: Juan Martínez Munuera (Spain)
21 July 2016
20:00

Brøndby (Denmark)	0–1 (a.e.t.)	(Scotland) Hibernian
	Report	Gray 62'
Penalties
Larsson (penalty scored); Nørgaard (penalty scored); Stückler (penalty scored); Wilczek (penalty scored); Holst (penalty scored)	5–3	(penalty missed) McGinn; (penalty scored) Hanlon; (penalty scored) Holt; (penalty scored) Boyle

Brøndby Stadium, Brøndbyvester
Attendance: 11,548
Referee: Marius Avram (Romania)

1–1 on aggregate; Brøndby won 5–3 on penalties.

14 July 2016
19:30

Shakhtyor Soligorsk (Belarus)	1–1	(Slovenia) Domžale
Ignjatijević 35'	Report	Trajkovski 52'

Stroitel Stadium, Salihorsk
Attendance: 2,100
Referee: Dumitru Muntean (Moldova)
21 July 2016
20:30

Domžale (Slovenia)	2–1	(Belarus) Shakhtyor Soligorsk
Alvir 35'; Majer 69'	Report	Laptsew 61'

Sports Park, Domžale
Attendance: 1,800
Referee: Alain Bieri (Switzerland)

Domžale won 3–2 on aggregate.

14 July 2016
21:05

Austria Wien	1–0	(Albania) Kukësi
Pires 24'	Report

Ernst-Happel-Stadion, Vienna (Note: Austria Wien played their home matches at Ernst-Happel-Stadion, Vienna, instead of their regular stadium Franz Horr Stadium, Vienna, due to reconstruction.)
Attendance: 4,312
Referee: Paolo Valeri (Italy)
21 July 2016
19:30

Kukësi (Albania)	1–4	Austria Wien
Hallaçi 78'	Report	Kayode 16', 58'; Holzhauser 67'; Martschinko 90+4'

Elbasan Arena, Elbasan
Attendance: 1,580
Referee: Vilhjálmur Alvar Þórarinsson (Iceland)

Austria Wien won 5–1 on aggregate.

14 July 2016
20:30

MTK Budapest (Hungary)	1–2	(Azerbaijan) Gabala
Torghelle 70'	Report	Kvekveskiri 25'; Ozobić 63'

Ménfői út, Győr
Attendance: 501
Referee: Bojan Pandžić (Sweden)
21 July 2016
19:00

Gabala (Azerbaijan)	2–0	(Hungary) MTK Budapest
Zenjov 7'; Weeks 37'	Report

Bakcell Arena, Baku
Attendance: 5,550
Referee: Mete Kalkavan (Turkey)

Gabala won 4–1 on aggregate.

14 July 2016
19:30

Beroe Stara Zagora (Bulgaria)	1–1	(Finland) HJK
Penev 49'	Report	Morelos 38'

Beroe Stadium, Stara Zagora
Attendance: 4,424
Referee: Petr Ardeleanu (Czech Republic)
21 July 2016
18:00

HJK (Finland)	1–0	(Bulgaria) Beroe Stara Zagora
Tanaka 25'	Report

Sonera Stadium, Helsinki
Attendance: 3,872
Referee: Padraig Sutton (Republic of Ireland)

HJK won 2–1 on aggregate.

14 July 2016
18:00

RoPS (Finland)	1–1	(Croatia) Lokomotiva Zagreb
Prenga 87' (o.g.)	Report	Jammeh 73' (o.g.)

Keskuskenttä, Rovaniemi
Attendance: 1,812
Referee: Þorvaldur Árnason (Iceland)
21 July 2016
18:00

Lokomotiva Zagreb (Croatia)	3–0	(Finland) RoPS
Fiolić 44'; Marić 49', 83'	Report

Stadion Kranjčevićeva, Zagreb
Attendance: 630
Referee: Giorgi Kruashvili (Georgia)

Lokomotiva Zagreb won 4–1 on aggregate.

14 July 2016
18:00

Neftçi (Azerbaijan)	0–0	(North Macedonia) Shkëndija
	Report

Bakcell Arena, Baku
Attendance: 6,891
Referee: Sergey Tsinkevich (Belarus)
21 July 2016
20:00

Shkëndija (North Macedonia)	1–0	(Azerbaijan) Neftçi
Ibraimi 31'	Report

Philip II Arena, Skopje
Attendance: 9,510
Referee: Erik Lambrechts (Belgium)

Shkëndija won 1–0 on aggregate.

14 July 2016
21:15

KR (Iceland)	3–3	(Switzerland) Grasshopper
Andersen 46', 50'; Hauksson 77' (pen.)	Report	Munsy 18'; Gjorgjev 36'; Caio 59'

KR-völlur, Reykjavík
Attendance: 767
Referee: Peter Kjærsgaard-Andersen (Denmark)
21 July 2016
19:00

Grasshopper (Switzerland)	2–1	(Iceland) KR
Sigurjónsson 45', 68'	Report	Andersen 52'

Letzigrund, Zürich
Attendance: 3,940
Referee: Erez Papir (Israel)

Grasshopper won 5–4 on aggregate.

14 July 2016
18:30

Midtjylland (Denmark)	3–0	(Liechtenstein) Vaduz
Sisto 20', 82'; Onuachu 73'	Report

MCH Arena, Herning
Attendance: 4,455
Referee: Kirill Levnikov (Russia)
21 July 2016
19:00

Vaduz (Liechtenstein)	2–2	(Denmark) Midtjylland
Brunner 83'; Costanzo 86' (pen.)	Report	Sisto 41', 68'

Rheinpark Stadion, Vaduz
Attendance: 842
Referee: Andrew Davey (Northern Ireland)

Midtjylland won 5–2 on aggregate.

14 July 2016
19:00

Zimbru Chișinău (Moldova)	2–2	(Turkey) Osmanlıspor
Zagaevschi 24'; Damașcan 62'	Report	Çürüksu 12'; Bekdemir 77'

Zimbru Stadium, Chișinău
Attendance: 4,160
Referee: Nenad Đokić (Serbia)
21 July 2016
20:00

Osmanlıspor (Turkey)	5–0	(Moldova) Zimbru Chișinău
Umar 16' (pen.), 26', 50'; Kılıçaslan 74'; Rusescu 83'	Report

Osmanlı Stadyumu, Ankara
Attendance: 6,382
Referee: Mitja Žganec (Slovenia)

Osmanlıspor won 7–2 on aggregate.

14 July 2016
20:00

PAS Giannina (Greece)	3–0	(Norway) Odd
Michail 7'; Fonsi 31'; Acosta 68'	Report

Zosimades Stadium, Ioannina
Attendance: 5,615
Referee: Glenn Nyberg (Sweden)
21 July 2016
19:00

Odd (Norway)	3–1 (a.e.t.)	(Greece) PAS Giannina
Nordkvelle 55' (pen.); Bentley 57'; Ruud 89'	Report	Koutris 98'

Skagerak Arena, Skien
Attendance: 3,184
Referee: Tomasz Musiał (Poland)

PAS Giannina won 4–3 on aggregate.

14 July 2016
20:30

Birkirkara (Malta)	0–0	(Scotland) Heart of Midlothian
	Report

Hibernians Stadium, Paola
Attendance: 1,868
Referee: Ivaylo Stoyanov (Bulgaria)
21 July 2016
21:00

Heart of Midlothian (Scotland)	1–2	(Malta) Birkirkara
Sammon 74'	Report	Bubalović 55'; Herrera 67'

Tynecastle Stadium, Edinburgh
Attendance: 14,301
Referee: Ville Nevalainen (Finland)

Birkirkara won 2–1 on aggregate.

14 July 2016
20:00

Maribor (Slovenia)	0–0	(Bulgaria) Levski Sofia
	Report

Ljudski vrt, Maribor
Attendance: 7,345
Referee: Cristian Balaj (Romania)
21 July 2016
19:00

Levski Sofia (Bulgaria)	1–1	(Slovenia) Maribor
Narh 22'	Report	Tavares 68'

Georgi Asparuhov Stadium, Sofia
Attendance: 17,600
Referee: Michael Tykgaard (Denmark)

1–1 on aggregate; Maribor won on away goals.

14 July 2016
20:45

Piast Gliwice (Poland)	0–3	(Sweden) IFK Göteborg
	Report	Rogne 2'; Hysén 35'; Engvall 86'

Stadion Piast, Gliwice
Attendance: 5,629
Referee: Manuel Schüttengruber (Austria)
21 July 2016
19:00

IFK Göteborg (Sweden)	0–0	(Poland) Piast Gliwice
	Report

Gamla Ullevi, Gothenburg
Attendance: 7,276
Referee: Georgios Kominis (Greece)

IFK Göteborg won 3–0 on aggregate.

14 July 2016
20:15

Slovan Bratislava (Slovakia)	0–0	(Latvia) Jelgava
	Report

Štadión Pasienky, Bratislava
Attendance: 1,451
Referee: Alexandros Aretopoulos (Greece)
21 July 2016
17:30

Jelgava (Latvia)	3–0	(Slovakia) Slovan Bratislava
Kļuškins 27' (pen.); Bogdaškins 48'; Malašenoks 85'	Report

Olympic Sports Center of Zemgale, Jelgava
Attendance: 1,560
Referee: Ken Henry Johnsen (Norway)

Jelgava won 3–0 on aggregate.

14 July 2016
19:00

Beitar Jerusalem (Israel)	1–0	(Cyprus) Omonia
Abuhatzira 71'	Report

Teddy Stadium, Jerusalem
Attendance: 9,200
Referee: Marcin Borski (Poland)
21 July 2016
18:30

Omonia (Cyprus)	3–2	(Israel) Beitar Jerusalem
Agayev 26'; Sheridan 45+3' (pen.); Roushias 81'	Report	Atzili 17', 45' (pen.)

GSP Stadium, Nicosia
Attendance: 14,383
Referee: Davide Massa (Italy)

3–3 on aggregate; Beitar Jerusalem won on away goals.

14 July 2016
19:00

Admira Wacker Mödling (Austria)	1–0	(Azerbaijan) Kapaz
Starkl 41'	Report

NV Arena, Sankt Pölten
Attendance: 956
Referee: Pavle Radovanović (Montenegro)
20 July 2016
18:00

Kapaz (Azerbaijan)	0–2	(Austria) Admira Wacker Mödling
	Report	Knasmüllner 17'; Schmidt 76'

Dalga Arena, Baku
Attendance: 1,650
Referee: Vitali Meshkov (Russia)

Admira Wacker Mödling won 3–0 on aggregate.

14 July 2016
20:45

Aberdeen (Scotland)	3–0	(Latvia) Ventspils
Stockley 72'; Rooney 76'; Burns 90+2'	Report

Pittodrie Stadium, Aberdeen
Attendance: 10,672
Referee: João Pinheiro (Portugal)
21 July 2016
17:00

Ventspils (Latvia)	0–1	(Scotland) Aberdeen
	Report	Rooney 79'

Olimpiskais Stadions, Ventspils
Attendance: 2,100
Referee: Danilo Grujić (Serbia)

Aberdeen won 4–0 on aggregate.

14 July 2016
19:00

BK Häcken (Sweden)	1–1	(Republic of Ireland) Cork City
Owoeri 83'	Report	Maguire 64' (pen.)

Bravida Arena, Gothenburg
Attendance: 2,022
Referee: Amaury Delerue (France)
21 July 2016
20:45

Cork City (Republic of Ireland)	1–0	(Sweden) BK Häcken
O'Connor 26'	Report

Turners Cross, Cork
Attendance: 5,334
Referee: Carlos Xistra (Portugal)

Cork City won 2–1 on aggregate.

14 July 2016
16:45

Kairat (Kazakhstan)	1–1	(Israel) Maccabi Tel Aviv
Arshavin 29'	Report	Benayoun 90+1'

Central Stadium, Almaty
Attendance: 22,500
Referee: Antti Munukka (Finland)
21 July 2016
19:00

Maccabi Tel Aviv (Israel)	2–1	(Kazakhstan) Kairat
Ben Haim II 5'; Alberman 86'	Report	Gohou 64'

Netanya Stadium, Netanya
Attendance: 9,832
Referee: Tiago Martins (Portugal)

Maccabi Tel Aviv won 3–2 on aggregate.

14 July 2016
18:30

Debrecen (Hungary)	1–2	(Belarus) Torpedo-BelAZ Zhodino
Tisza 2'	Report	Zahynaylov 23'; Klopotskiy 88'

Nagyerdei Stadion, Debrecen
Attendance: 6,015
Referee: Leontios Trattou (Cyprus)
21 July 2016
18:00

Torpedo-BelAZ Zhodino (Belarus)	1–0	(Hungary) Debrecen
Dzemidovich 25'	Report

Torpedo Stadium, Zhodzina
Attendance: 2,650
Referee: Dimitar Meckarovski (Macedonia)

Torpedo-BelAZ Zhodino won 3–1 on aggregate.

14 July 2016
20:00

CSM Politehnica Iași (Romania)	2–2	(Croatia) Hajduk Split
Cristea 19'; Piccioni 23'	Report	Ohandza 48'; Said 90+4'

Stadionul Emil Alexandrescu, Iași
Attendance: 8,004
Referee: Yuriy Mozharovsky (Ukraine)
21 July 2016
20:30

Hajduk Split (Croatia)	2–1	(Romania) CSM Politehnica Iași
Tudor 22'; Ohandza 90'	Report	Ciucur 26'

Stadion Poljud, Split
Attendance: 16,798
Referee: Frank Schneider (France)

Hajduk Split won 4–3 on aggregate.

14 July 2016
20:30

Videoton (Hungary)	2–0	(Serbia) Čukarički
Bódi 58'; Suljić 90+2'	Report

Pancho Arena, Felcsút
Attendance: 1,858
Referee: Mads-Kristoffer Kristoffersen (Denmark)
21 July 2016
20:30

Čukarički (Serbia)	1–1	(Hungary) Videoton
Fofana 13'	Report	Géresi 76'

Čukarički Stadium, Belgrade
Attendance: 1,653
Referee: Alexandre Boucaut (Belgium)

Videoton won 3–1 on aggregate.

14 July 2016
20:45

Cliftonville (Northern Ireland)	2–3	(Cyprus) AEK Larnaca
McGuinness 18'; J. Donnelly 50'	Report	Tričkovski 59'; Charalambous 64'; Joan Tomàs 77'

Solitude, Belfast
Attendance: 1,352
Referee: Adrien Jaccottet (Switzerland)
21 July 2016
19:00

AEK Larnaca (Cyprus)	2–0	(Northern Ireland) Cliftonville
Boljević 45'; Joan Tomàs 48'	Report

Antonis Papadopoulos Stadium, Larnaca
Attendance: 2,112
Referee: Tihomir Pejin (Croatia)

AEK Larnaca won 5–2 on aggregate.

14 July 2016
19:00

AIK (Sweden)	1–0	(Gibraltar) Europa
Strandberg 89'	Report

Friends Arena, Solna
Attendance: 5,250
Referee: Ognjen Valjić (Bosnia and Herzegovina)
21 July 2016
19:00

Europa (Gibraltar)	0–1	(Sweden) AIK
	Report	Markkanen 55'

Victoria Stadium, Gibraltar
Attendance: 1,145
Referee: Ádám Farkas (Hungary)

AIK won 2–0 on aggregate.

14 July 2016
18:00

Levadia Tallinn (Estonia)	3–1	(Czech Republic) Slavia Prague
Hunt 35'; Gando 67'; Antonov 90'	Report	Mingazow 63'

Kadriorg Stadium, Tallinn
Attendance: 2,750
Referee: Neil Doyle (Republic of Ireland)
21 July 2016
19:00

Slavia Prague (Czech Republic)	2–0	(Estonia) Levadia Tallinn
Škoda 10'; Van Kessel 67'	Report

Eden Arena, Prague
Attendance: 14,856
Referee: Christos Nicolaides (Cyprus)

3–3 on aggregate; Slavia Prague won on away goals.

14 July 2016
20:00

Genk (Belgium)	2–0	(Montenegro) Budućnost Podgorica
Kebano 17' (pen.); Samatta 79'	Report

Luminus Arena, Genk
Attendance: 10,450
Referee: Vilhjálmur Alvar Þórarinsson (Iceland)
21 July 2016
20:45

Budućnost Podgorica (Montenegro)	2–0 (a.e.t.)	(Belgium) Genk
Đalović 1'; Raičković 40'	Report
Penalties
Radunović (penalty scored); Raspopović (penalty missed); Đalović (penalty scored); Mirković (penalty missed)	2–4	(penalty scored) Buffel; (penalty scored) Heynen; (penalty scored) Samatta; (penalty scored) Wouters

City Stadium, Podgorica
Attendance: 4,500
Referee: Charalambos Kalogeropoulos (Greece)

2–2 on aggregate; Genk won 4–2 on penalties.

14 July 2016
19:00

SønderjyskE (Denmark)	2–1	(Norway) Strømsgodset
Kløve 9'; Uhre 82'	Report	Pedersen 16'

Sydbank Park, Haderslev
Attendance: 4,795
Referee: Georgi Kabakov (Bulgaria)
21 July 2016
19:00

Strømsgodset (Norway)	2–2 (a.e.t.)	(Denmark) SønderjyskE
Keita 17', 45+2'	Report	Uhre 69'; Kløve 120'

Marienlyst Stadion, Drammen
Attendance: 3,875
Referee: Steven McLean (Scotland)

SønderjyskE won 4–3 on aggregate.
