= András Lénárt =

Slovak footballer

Personal information
- Full name: András Lénárt
- Date of birth: 14 April 1998 (age 28)
- Place of birth: Šaľa, Slovakia
- Height: 1.78 m (5 ft 10 in)
- Position: Midfielder

Team information
- Current team: Družstevník Trstice

Youth career
- –2013: FC Nitra
- 2013–2016: Győri ETO

Senior career*
| Years | Team | Apps | (Gls) |
| 2015 | Győri ETO | 1 | (0) |
| 2016–2018 | Videoton | 1 | (0) |
| 2017 | → Tatran Prešov (loan) | 2 | (0) |
| 2018 | → Siófok (loan) | 12 | (0) |
| 2019– | Družstevník Trstice | | |

International career
| 2016–2017 | Slovakia U19 | 6 | (0) |
- * Club domestic league appearances and goals as of 13:01, 30 May 2019 (UTC)

András Lénárt (born 14 April 1998) is a Slovak footballer who plays as midfielder for TJ Družstevník Trstice.

== Career ==
In the summer 2016, Lénárt joined Videoton FC on a contract until 2020. One year later he was sent out on loan at 1. FC Tatran Prešov until the end of 2017. In February 2018, he was loaned out to BFC Siófok.

On 18 February 2019 it was announced, that Lénárt had joined Družstevník Trstice.
