= Krisztián Géresi =

Hungarian footballer (born 1994)

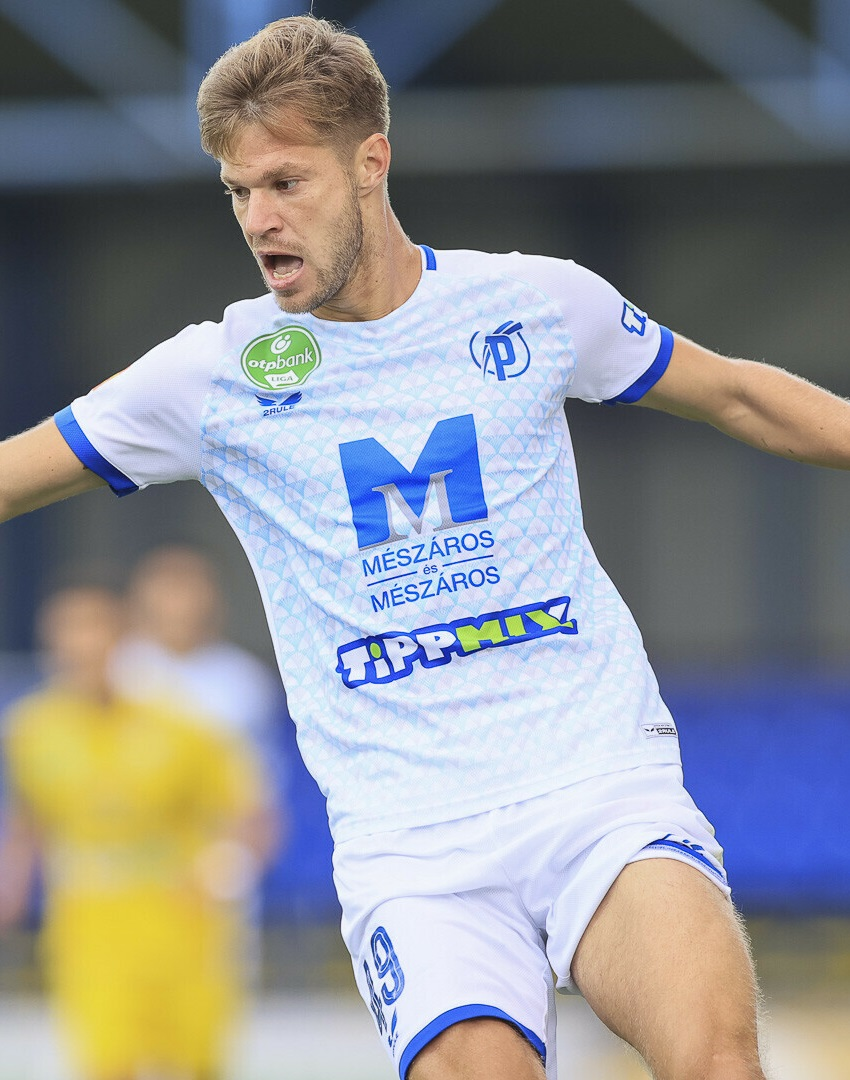
- Géresi playing for Puskás Akadémia in 2021

Personal information
- Date of birth: 14 June 1994 (age 32)
- Place of birth: Székesfehérvár, Hungary
- Height: 1.82 m (6 ft 0 in)
- Position: Midfielder

Team information
- Current team: Nyíregyháza
- Number: 49

Youth career
- 2003–2015: Videoton

Senior career*
Years	Team	Apps	(Gls)
2013–2022	Fehérvár II	76	(32)
2015–2022	Fehérvár	63	(9)
2021	→ Puskás Akadémia (loan)	18	(3)
2022–2023	Vasas	9	(0)
2023	→ Szeged-Csanád (loan)	14	(4)
2023–2024	Nyíregyháza	21	(10)

International career
2016	Hungary U21	3	(0)
2021	Hungary	1	(0)
- * Club domestic league appearances and goals

Krisztián Géresi (born 14 June 1994) is a Hungarian football player who finished his career at Nyíregyháza.

== Club career ==
On 2 December 2015 he was signed by Nemzeti Bajnokság I club Videoton.

On 26 March it was announced by Marko Nikolić, manager of Videoton FC, that Géresi could not play in the remaining rounds of the 2017–18 Nemzeti Bajnokság I season.

On 10 June 2022, Géresi signed a two-year contract with Vasas. He did not establish himself as a starter in the first half of the season, and on 14 February 2023 Géresi moved on loan to Szeged-Csanád.

== International career ==
He made his debut for Hungary national football team on 28 March 2021 in a World Cup qualifier against San Marino.

== Career statistics ==
Appearances and goals by club, season and competition
Club	Season	League			Cup		League Cup		Europe		Total	
Club	Season	Division	Apps	Goals	Apps	Goals	Apps	Goals	Apps	Goals	Apps	Goals
Videoton II
Videoton II	2012–13	Nemzeti Bajnokság II	0	0	0	0	1	0	—		1	0
Videoton II	2013–14	Nemzeti Bajnokság III	23	3	0	0	—		—		23	3
Videoton II	2014–15	Nemzeti Bajnokság III	23	9	0	0	—		—		23	9
Videoton II	2015–16	Nemzeti Bajnokság III	17	11	0	0	—		—		17	11
Videoton II	2016–17	Nemzeti Bajnokság III	3	1	0	0	—		—		3	1
Videoton II	2017–18	Nemzeti Bajnokság III	1	2	0	0	—		—		1	2
Videoton II	2020–21	Nemzeti Bajnokság III	6	3	0	0	—		—		6	3
Videoton II	2021–22	Nemzeti Bajnokság III	3	3	0	0	—		—		3	3
Videoton II	Total		76	32	0	0	1	0	—		77	32
Videoton
Videoton	2014–15	Nemzeti Bajnokság I	0	0	0	0	3	1	—		3	1
Videoton	2015–16	Nemzeti Bajnokság I	13	2	0	0	—		0	0	13	2
Videoton	2016–17	Nemzeti Bajnokság I	30	6	1	0	—		6	2	37	8
Videoton	2017–18	Nemzeti Bajnokság I	13	1	3	0	—		4	1	20	1
Videoton	2020–21	Nemzeti Bajnokság I	5	0	2	1	—		1	0	8	1
Videoton	2021–22	Nemzeti Bajnokság I	2	0	0	0	—		0	0	2	0
Videoton	Total		63	9	6	1	3	1	11	3	83	14
Puskás Akadémia
Puskás Akadémia	2020–21	Nemzeti Bajnokság I	12	3	1	0	—		0	0	13	3
Puskás Akadémia	2021–22	Nemzeti Bajnokság I	6	0	0	0	—		0	0	6	0
Puskás Akadémia	Total		18	3	1	0	0	0	0	0	19	3
Career total			157	44	7	1	4	1	11	3	179	49

Updated to games played as of 15 May 2022.

== Honours ==
Videoton

- Nemzeti Bajnokság I: 2017–18
