= 2016–17 UEFA Europa League =

46th season of Europe's secondary club football tournament organised by UEFA

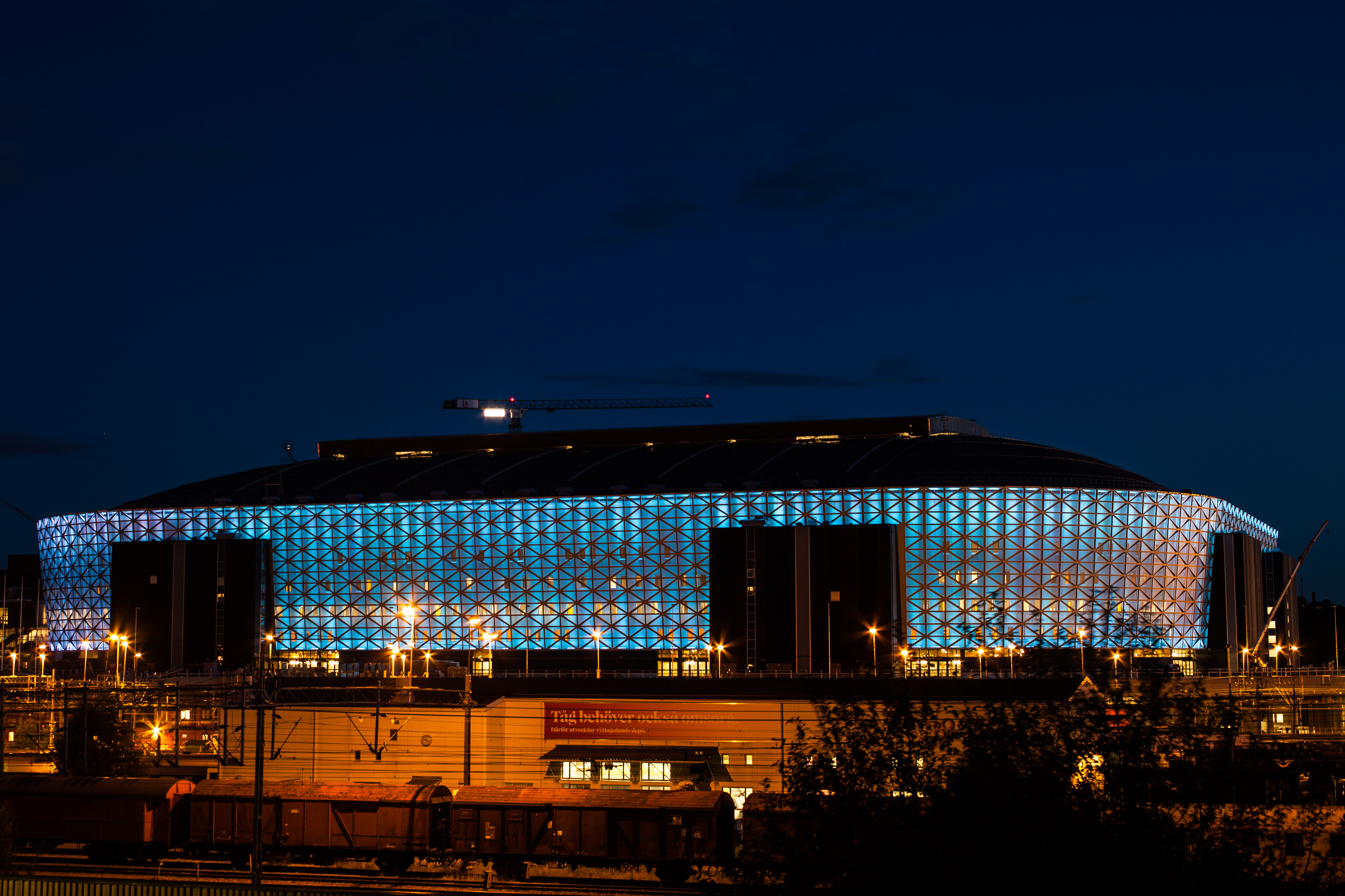
- The Friends Arena in Solna hosted the final

Tournament details
- Dates: Qualifying: 28 June – 25 August 2016; Competition proper: 15 September 2016 – 24 May 2017
- Teams: Competition proper: 48+8; Total: 155+33 (from 54 associations)

Final positions
- Champions: (England) Manchester United (1st title)
- Runners-up: (Netherlands) Ajax

Tournament statistics
- Matches played: 205
- Goals scored: 565 (2.76 per match)
- Attendance: 4,494,039 (21,922 per match)
- Top scorer(s): Edin Džeko (Roma); Giuliano (Zenit Saint Petersburg); 8 goals each
- Best player: Paul Pogba (Manchester United)

The 2016–17 UEFA Europa League was the 46th season of Europe's secondary club football tournament organised by UEFA, and the eighth season since it was renamed from the UEFA Cup to the UEFA Europa League.

The final was played between Ajax and Manchester United at the Friends Arena in Solna, Sweden. Manchester United beat Ajax 2–0 to win their first title. With this victory, they became the fifth club – after Juventus, Ajax, Bayern Munich and Chelsea – to have won all three major European trophies at the time (European Champion Clubs' Cup/UEFA Champions League, UEFA Cup/UEFA Europa League, and the now-defunct Cup Winners' Cup).

Manchester United qualified for the 2017–18 UEFA Champions League, and also earned the right to play against the winners of the 2016–17 UEFA Champions League, Real Madrid, in the 2017 UEFA Super Cup.

As the title holders, Sevilla qualified for the 2016–17 UEFA Champions League. Having won the last three Europa League tournaments, Sevilla were unable to defend their titles as they reached the Champions League knockout stage, where they were eliminated by Leicester City in the round of 16.

== Association team allocation ==
A total of 188 teams from 54 of the 55 UEFA member associations were expected to participate in the 2016–17 UEFA Europa League (the exception being Kosovo, whose participation was not accepted in their first attempt as UEFA members). The association ranking based on the UEFA country coefficients was used to determine the number of participating teams for each association:

- Associations 1–51 (except Liechtenstein) each had three teams qualify.
  - As the winners of the 2015–16 UEFA Europa League, Sevilla qualified for the 2016–17 UEFA Champions League; the 2016–17 UEFA Europa League berth they would otherwise have earned for finishing 7th in the 2015–16 La Liga was vacated and not passed to another Spanish team.
- Associations 52–53 each had two teams qualify.
- Liechtenstein and Gibraltar each had one team qualify (Liechtenstein organises only a domestic cup and no domestic league; Gibraltar as per decision by the UEFA Executive Committee).
- Moreover, 33 teams eliminated from the 2016–17 UEFA Champions League were transferred to the Europa League.

The UEFA Executive Committee approved in December 2014 changes to the rewards given according to the Respect Fair Play ranking, and starting from the 2016–17 season, the three Fair Play berths were no longer allocated to the Europa League.

=== Association ranking ===
For the 2016–17 UEFA Champions League, the associations were allocated places according to their 2015 UEFA country coefficients, which took into account their performance in European competitions from 2010–11 to 2014–15.

Apart from the allocation based on the country coefficients, associations could have additional teams participating in the Europa League, as noted below:

- (CL) – Additional teams transferred from Champions League
- (EL) – Vacated berth due to Europa League title holders playing in Champions League

Rank	Association	Coeff.	Teams	Notes
1	Spain	99.999	3	+1(CL) −1(EL)
2	England	80.391	3	+1(CL)
3	Germany	79.415	3	+1(CL)
4	Italy	70.510	3	+1(CL)
5	Portugal	61.382	3	
6	France	52.416	3	+1(CL)
7	Russia	50.498	3	+1(CL)
8	Ukraine	45.166	3	+1(CL)
9	Netherlands	40.979	3	+1(CL)
10	Belgium	37.200	3	+1(CL)
11	Switzerland	34.375	3	+1(CL)
12	Turkey	32.600	3	+2(CL)
13	Greece	31.900	3	+2(CL)
14	Czech Republic	29.125	3	+2(CL)
15	Romania	26.299	3	+2(CL)
16	Austria	25.675	3	+1(CL)
17	Croatia	23.500	3	
18	Cyprus	22.300	3	+1(CL)
19	Poland	21.500	3	+1(CL)

Rank	Association	Coeff.	Teams	Notes
20	Israel	21.000	3	+1(CL)
21	Belarus	20.750	3	+1(CL)
22	Denmark	19.800	3	+1(CL)
23	Scotland	17.900	3	
24	Sweden	17.725	3	
25	Bulgaria	16.750	3	+1(CL)
26	Norway	14.375	3	+1(CL)
27	Serbia	13.875	3	+1(CL)
28	Slovenia	13.625	3	
29	Azerbaijan	12.500	3	+1(CL)
30	Slovakia	11.250	3	+1(CL)
31	Hungary	11.000	3	
32	Kazakhstan	10.375	3	+1(CL)
33	Moldova	10.000	3	
34	Georgia	9.375	3	+1(CL)
35	Finland	8.200	3	
36	Iceland	8.000	3	
37	Bosnia and Herzegovina	7.500	3	

Rank	Association	Coeff.	Teams	Notes
38	Liechtenstein	6.000	1	
39	Macedonia	5.875	3	
40	Republic of Ireland	5.750	3	+1(CL)
41	Montenegro	5.625	3	
42	Albania	5.375	3	+1(CL)
43	Luxembourg	5.125	3	
44	Northern Ireland	4.875	3	
45	Lithuania	4.500	3	
46	Latvia	4.250	3	
47	Malta	4.208	3	
48	Estonia	3.500	3	
49	Faroe Islands	3.500	3	
50	Wales	2.875	3	
51	Armenia	2.750	3	
52	Andorra	0.833	2	
53	San Marino	0.499	2	
54	Gibraltar	0.250	1	
55	Kosovo	0.000	0	

=== Distribution ===
In the default access list, Sevilla enter the third qualifying round (as the seventh-placed team of the 2015–16 La Liga). However, since they qualified for the Champions League as the Europa League title holders, the spot which they qualified for in the Europa League third qualifying round is vacated, and the following changes to the default allocation system are made:

- The domestic cup winners of association 18 (Cyprus) are promoted from the second qualifying round to the third qualifying round.
- The domestic cup winners of associations 27 (Serbia) and 28 (Slovenia) are promoted from the first qualifying round to the second qualifying round.

	Teams entering in this round	Teams advancing from previous round	Teams transferred from Champions League
First qualifying round (96 teams)	26 domestic cup winners from associations 29–54; 35 domestic league runners-up from associations 18–53 (except Liechtenstein); 35 domestic league third-placed teams from associations 16–51 (except Liechtenstein)		
Second qualifying round (66 teams)	10 domestic cup winners from associations 19–28; 2 domestic league runners-up from associations 16–17; 6 domestic league fourth-placed teams from associations 10–15	48 winners from first qualifying round	
Third qualifying round (58 teams)	6 domestic cup winners from associations 13–18; 9 domestic league third-placed teams from associations 7–15; 5 domestic league fourth-placed teams from associations 5–9; 3 domestic league fifth-placed teams from associations 4–6 (League Cup winners for France); 2 domestic league sixth-placed teams from associations 1–3 (League Cup winners for England) (except Europa League title holders)	33 winners from second qualifying round	
Play-off round (44 teams)		29 winners from third qualifying round	15 losers from Champions League third qualifying round
Group stage (48 teams)	12 domestic cup winners from associations 1–12; 1 domestic league fourth-placed team from association 4; 3 domestic league fifth-placed teams from associations 1–3	22 winners from play-off round	10 losers from Champions League play-off round
Knockout phase (32 teams)		12 group winners from group stage; 12 group runners-up from group stage	8 third-placed teams from Champions League group stage

==== Redistribution rules ====
A Europa League place is vacated when a team qualifies for both the Champions League and the Europa League, or qualifies for the Europa League by more than one method. When a place is vacated, it is redistributed within the national association by the following rules (regulations Articles 3.03 and 3.04):

- When the domestic cup winners (considered as the "highest-placed" qualifier within the national association with the latest starting round) also qualify for the Champions League, their Europa League place is vacated. As a result, the highest-placed team in the league which have not yet qualified for European competitions qualify for the Europa League, with the Europa League qualifiers which finish above them in the league moved up one "place".
- When the domestic cup winners also qualify for the Europa League through league position, their place through the league position is vacated. As a result, the highest-placed team in the league which have not yet qualified for European competitions qualify for the Europa League, with the Europa League qualifiers which finish above them in the league moved up one "place" if possible.
- For associations where a Europa League place is reserved for the League Cup winners, they always qualify for the Europa League as the "lowest-placed" qualifier. If the League Cup winners have already qualified for European competitions through other methods, this reserved Europa League place is taken by the highest-placed team in the league which have not yet qualified for European competitions.

=== Teams ===
The labels in the parentheses show how each team qualified for the place of its starting round:

- CW: Cup winners
- 2nd, 3rd, 4th, 5th, 6th, etc.: League position
- LC: League Cup winners
- RW: Regular season winners
- PW: End-of-season European competition play-offs winners
- CL: Transferred from Champions League
  - GS: Third-placed teams from group stage
  - PO: Losers from play-off round
  - Q3: Losers from third qualifying round

Round of 32
(Bulgaria) Ludogorets Razgrad (CL GS)	(Germany) Borussia Mönchengladbach (CL GS)	(England) Tottenham Hotspur (CL GS)	(Denmark) Copenhagen (CL GS)
(Turkey) Beşiktaş (CL GS)	(Russia) Rostov (CL GS)	(Poland) Legia Warsaw (CL GS)	(France) Lyon (CL GS)
Group stage
(Spain) Athletic Bilbao (5th)	(Italy) Fiorentina (5th)	(Switzerland) Zürich (CW)	(Romania) Steaua București (CL PO)
(Spain) Celta Vigo (6th)	(Portugal) Braga (CW)	(Turkey) Konyaspor (3rd)	(Italy) Roma (CL PO)
(England) Manchester United (CW)	(France) Nice (4th)	(Czech Republic) Viktoria Plzeň (CL PO)	(Netherlands) Ajax (CL PO)
(England) Southampton (6th)	(Russia) Zenit Saint Petersburg (CW)	(Israel) Hapoel Be'er Sheva (CL PO)	(Switzerland) Young Boys (CL PO)
(Germany) Schalke 04 (5th)	(Ukraine) Zorya Luhansk (4th)	(Cyprus) APOEL (CL PO)	(Spain) Villarreal (CL PO)
(Germany) Mainz 05 (6th)	(Netherlands) Feyenoord (CW)	(Republic of Ireland) Dundalk (CL PO)	
(Italy) Internazionale (4th)	(Belgium) Standard Liège (CW)	(Austria) Red Bull Salzburg (CL PO)	
Play-off round
(Norway) Rosenborg (CL Q3)	(Slovakia) Trenčín (CL Q3)	(Serbia) Red Star Belgrade (CL Q3)	(Ukraine) Shakhtar Donetsk (CL Q3)
(Georgia (country)) Dinamo Tbilisi (CL Q3)	(Azerbaijan) Qarabağ (CL Q3)	(Albania) Partizani (CL Q3)	(Belgium) Anderlecht (CL Q3)
(Greece) Olympiacos (CL Q3)	(Romania) Astra Giurgiu (CL Q3)	(Greece) PAOK (CL Q3)	(Turkey) Fenerbahçe (CL Q3)
(Kazakhstan) Astana (CL Q3)	(Belarus) BATE Borisov (CL Q3)	(Czech Republic) Sparta Prague (CL Q3)	
Third qualifying round
(England) West Ham United (7th)	(Russia) Krasnodar (4th)	(Switzerland) Luzern (3rd)	(Romania) Viitorul Constanța (5th)
(Germany) Hertha BSC (7th)	(Russia) Spartak Moscow (5th)	(Turkey) İstanbul Başakşehir (4th)	(Austria) Rapid Wien (2nd)
(Italy) Sassuolo (6th)	(Ukraine) Vorskla Poltava (5th)	(Greece) AEK Athens (CW)	(Croatia) Rijeka (2nd)
(Portugal) Arouca (5th)	(Ukraine) Oleksandriya (6th)	(Greece) Panathinaikos (3rd)	(Cyprus) Apollon Limassol (CW)
(Portugal) Rio Ave (6th)	(Netherlands) AZ (4th)	(Czech Republic) Mladá Boleslav (CW)	
(France) Lille (5th)	(Netherlands) Heracles Almelo (PW)	(Czech Republic) Slovan Liberec (3rd)	
(France) Saint-Étienne (6th)	(Belgium) Gent (3rd)	(Romania) Pandurii Târgu Jiu (3rd)	
Second qualifying round
(Belgium) Genk (PW)	(Romania) CSM Politehnica Iași (7th)	(Belarus) Torpedo-BelAZ Zhodino (CW)	(Norway) Strømsgodset (2nd)
(Switzerland) Grasshopper (4th)	Austria Wien (3rd)	(Denmark) SønderjyskE (2nd)	(Serbia) Partizan (CW)
(Turkey) Osmanlıspor (5th)	(Croatia) Hajduk Split (3rd)	(Scotland) Hibernian (CW)	(Slovenia) Maribor (CW)
(Greece) PAS Giannina (6th)	(Poland) Piast Gliwice (2nd)	(Sweden) BK Häcken (CW)	
(Czech Republic) Slavia Prague (5th)	(Israel) Maccabi Haifa (CW)	(Bulgaria) Levski Sofia (2nd)	
First qualifying round
(Austria) Admira Wacker Mödling (4th)	(Azerbaijan) Gabala (3rd)	(Bosnia and Herzegovina) Radnik Bijeljina (CW)	(Lithuania) Sūduva (4th)
(Croatia) Lokomotiva Zagreb (4th)	(Azerbaijan) Kapaz (5th)	(Bosnia and Herzegovina) Sloboda Tuzla (2nd)	(Latvia) Jelgava (CW)
(Cyprus) AEK Larnaca (2nd)	(Azerbaijan) Neftçi (6th)	(Bosnia and Herzegovina) Široki Brijeg (3rd)	(Latvia) Ventspils (3rd)
(Cyprus) Omonia (4th)	(Slovakia) Slovan Bratislava (2nd)	(Liechtenstein) Vaduz (CW)	(Latvia) Spartaks Jūrmala (5th)
(Poland) Zagłębie Lubin (3rd)	(Slovakia) Spartak Myjava (3rd)	(North Macedonia) Shkëndija (CW)	(Malta) Hibernians (2nd)
(Poland) Cracovia (4th)	(Slovakia) Spartak Trnava (4th)	(North Macedonia) Sileks (3rd)	(Malta) Birkirkara (3rd)
(Israel) Maccabi Tel Aviv (2nd)	(Hungary) Videoton (2nd)	(North Macedonia) Rabotnicki (4th)	(Malta) Balzan (4th)
(Israel) Beitar Jerusalem (3rd)	(Hungary) Debrecen (3rd)	(Republic of Ireland) Cork City (2nd)	(Estonia) Levadia Tallinn (2nd)
(Belarus) Dinamo Minsk (2nd)	(Hungary) MTK Budapest (4th)	(Republic of Ireland) Shamrock Rovers (3rd)	(Estonia) Nõmme Kalju (3rd)
(Belarus) Shakhtyor Soligorsk (3rd)	(Kazakhstan) Kairat (CW)	(Republic of Ireland) St Patrick's Athletic (4th)	(Estonia) Infonet Tallinn (4th)
(Denmark) Midtjylland (3rd)	(Kazakhstan) Aktobe (3rd)	(Montenegro) Rudar Pljevlja (CW)	(Faroe Islands) Víkingur Gøta (CW)
(Denmark) Brøndby (4th)	(Kazakhstan) Ordabasy (4th)	(Montenegro) Budućnost Podgorica (2nd)	(Faroe Islands) NSÍ (2nd)
(Scotland) Aberdeen (2nd)	(Moldova) Zaria Bălți (CW)	(Montenegro) Bokelj (4th)	(Faroe Islands) HB (4th)
(Scotland) Heart of Midlothian (3rd)	(Moldova) Dacia Chișinău (2nd)	(Albania) Kukësi (CW)	(Wales) Bala Town (2nd)
(Sweden) IFK Göteborg (2nd)	(Moldova) Zimbru Chișinău (3rd)	(Albania) ~~Partizani~~ (2nd)	(Wales) Llandudno (3rd)
(Sweden) AIK (3rd)	(Georgia (country)) Samtredia (2nd)	(Albania) Teuta (4th)	(Wales) Connah's Quay Nomads (PW)
(Bulgaria) Beroe Stara Zagora (3rd)	(Georgia (country)) Dila Gori (3rd)	(Luxembourg) Fola Esch (2nd)	(Armenia) Banants (CW)
(Bulgaria) Slavia Sofia (4th)	(Georgia (country)) Chikhura Sachkhere (4th)	(Luxembourg) Differdange 03 (3rd)	(Armenia) Shirak (2nd)
(Norway) Stabæk (3rd)	(Finland) Mariehamn (CW)	(Luxembourg) Jeunesse Esch (4th)	(Armenia) Pyunik (3rd)
(Norway) Odd (4th)	(Finland) RoPS (2nd)	(Northern Ireland) Glenavon (CW)	(Andorra) UE Santa Coloma (CW)
(Serbia) Čukarički (3rd)	(Finland) HJK (3rd)	(Northern Ireland) Linfield (2nd)	(Andorra) Lusitanos (2nd)
(Serbia) Vojvodina (4th)	(Iceland) Valur (CW)	(Northern Ireland) Cliftonville (PW)	(San Marino) La Fiorita (CW)
(Slovenia) Domžale (3rd)	(Iceland) Breiðablik (2nd)	(Lithuania) Trakai (2nd)	(San Marino) Folgore (3rd)
(Slovenia) Gorica (4th)	(Iceland) KR (3rd)	(Lithuania) Atlantas (3rd)	(Gibraltar) Europa (2nd)

Notably two teams took part in the competition that were not playing in their national top division, Zürich (2nd tier) and Hibernian (2nd tier).

Notes

1. Albania (ALB): Partizani were transferred to the 2016–17 UEFA Champions League second qualifying round following the exclusion of Skënderbeu by UEFA for match-fixing.
2. Azerbaijan (AZE): Zira and Inter Baku would have qualified for the Europa League first qualifying round as the runners-up and fourth-placed team of the 2015–16 Azerbaijan Premier League respectively, but Zira failed to obtain a UEFA licence as the club has existed professionally for fewer than three seasons, and Inter Baku were excluded from participating in the 2016–17 European competitions by the UEFA Club Financial Control Body. As a result, the berths were given to the fifth-placed team Kapaz and the sixth-placed team Neftçi.
3. Bulgaria (BUL): CSKA Sofia would have qualified for the Europa League second qualifying round as the winners of the 2015–16 Bulgarian Cup, but were excluded from participating in the 2016–17 European competitions by the UEFA Club Financial Control Body. As a result, the runners-up of the 2015–16 A Group, Levski Sofia, entered the second qualifying round instead of the first qualifying round, and the first qualifying round berth was given to the fourth-placed team Slavia Sofia.
4. Greece (GRE): Panionios would have qualified for the Europa League second qualifying round as the fifth-placed team of the 2015–16 Super League Greece, but were excluded from participating in the 2016–17 European competitions by UEFA for financial reasons. As a result, the berth was given to the sixth-placed team PAS Giannina.
5. Kosovo (KOS): Kosovo became a UEFA member on 3 May 2016. UEFA decided that their domestic cup winners could participate in the 2016–17 UEFA Europa League only if they could meet licensing criteria under article 15 of the UEFA Club Licensing & Financial Fair Play regulations, which would be confirmed following the assessment made by the UEFA administration within the deadline of 31 May 2016. However, Kosovo's entry, Prishtina (as the winners of the 2015–16 Kosovar Cup), was denied by UEFA in June due to the club failing licensing requirements, and also because the club could not provide a suitable stadium and UEFA did not allow them to play their home matches in a foreign country.
6. Latvia (LVA): Skonto would have qualified for the Europa League first qualifying round as the runners-up of the 2015 Latvian Higher League, but failed to obtain a UEFA licence. As a result, the berth was given to the fifth-placed team Spartaks Jūrmala.
7. Malta (MLT): Sliema Wanderers would have qualified for the Europa League first qualifying round as the winners of the 2015–16 Maltese FA Trophy, but failed to obtain a UEFA licence. As a result, the berth was given to the fourth-placed team of the 2015–16 Maltese Premier League, Balzan.
8. Romania (ROU): CFR Cluj would have qualified for the Europa League third qualifying round as the winners of the 2015–16 Cupa României, but failed to obtain a UEFA licence after filing for insolvency in 2015. Dinamo București would have qualified for the Europa League second qualifying round as the fourth-placed team of the 2015–16 Liga I, but failed to obtain a UEFA licence after filing for insolvency in 2014. Dinamo București appealed to the Romanian Football Federation but the appeal was denied, and an appeal to Court of Arbitration for Sport was also rejected. As a result, the third qualifying round berth was given to the fifth-placed team Viitorul Constanța, and the second qualifying round berth was given to the seventh-placed team CSM Politehnica Iași, since the sixth-placed team Târgu Mureș were excluded from participating in the 2016–17 European competitions by the UEFA Club Financial Control Body.
9. Turkey (TUR): Galatasaray would have qualified for the Europa League group stage as the winners of the 2015–16 Turkish Cup, but were excluded from participating in the 2016–17 European competitions by the UEFA Club Financial Control Body. As a result, the third-placed team of the 2015–16 Süper Lig, Konyaspor, entered the group stage instead of the third qualifying round, the fourth-placed team İstanbul Başakşehir entered the third qualifying round instead of the second qualifying round, and the second qualifying round berth was given to the fifth-placed team Osmanlıspor. Galatasaray appealed the decision to the Court of Arbitration for Sport, but it was rejected.
10. Ukraine (UKR): Dnipro would have qualified for the Europa League group stage as the third-placed team of the 2015–16 Ukrainian Premier League, but were excluded from participating in the 2016–17 European competitions by the UEFA Club Financial Control Body. As a result, the fourth-placed team Zorya Luhansk entered the group stage instead of the third qualifying round, and the third qualifying round berth was given to the sixth-placed team Oleksandriya.

== Round and draw dates ==
The schedule of the competition was as follows (all draws were held at the UEFA headquarters in Nyon, Switzerland, unless stated otherwise).

Phase	Round	Draw date	First leg	Second leg
Qualifying	First qualifying round	20 June 2016	30 June 2016	7 July 2016
Qualifying	Second qualifying round	20 June 2016	14 July 2016	21 July 2016
Qualifying	Third qualifying round	15 July 2016	28 July 2016	4 August 2016
Play-off	Play-off round	5 August 2016	18 August 2016	25 August 2016
Group stage	Matchday 1	26 August 2016 (Monaco)	15 September 2016	
Group stage	Matchday 2	26 August 2016 (Monaco)	29 September 2016	
Group stage	Matchday 3	26 August 2016 (Monaco)	20 October 2016	
Group stage	Matchday 4	26 August 2016 (Monaco)	3 November 2016	
Group stage	Matchday 5	26 August 2016 (Monaco)	24 November 2016	
Group stage	Matchday 6	26 August 2016 (Monaco)	8 December 2016	
Knockout phase	Round of 32	12 December 2016	16 February 2017	23 February 2017
Knockout phase	Round of 16	24 February 2017	9 March 2017	16 March 2017
Knockout phase	Quarter-finals	17 March 2017	13 April 2017	20 April 2017
Knockout phase	Semi-finals	21 April 2017	4 May 2017	11 May 2017
Knockout phase	Final	21 April 2017	24 May 2017 at Friends Arena, Solna	

Matches in the qualifying, play-off, and knockout rounds could also be played on Tuesdays or Wednesdays instead of the regular Thursdays due to scheduling conflicts.

== Qualifying rounds ==
In the qualifying rounds and the play-off round, teams were divided into seeded and unseeded teams based on their 2016 UEFA club coefficients, and then drawn into two-legged home-and-away ties. Teams from the same association could not be drawn against each other.

=== First qualifying round ===
The draws for the first and second qualifying round were held on 20 June 2016. The first legs were played on 28 and 30 June, and the second legs were played on 5, 6 and 7 July 2016.

Team 1	Agg.	Team 2	1st leg	2nd leg
Midtjylland (Denmark)	2–0	(Lithuania) Sūduva	1–0	1–0
Heart of Midlothian (Scotland)	6–3 (Note: Order of legs reversed after original draw.)	(Estonia) Infonet Tallinn	2–1	4–2
Connah's Quay Nomads (Wales)	1–0	(Norway) Stabæk	0–0	1–0
Ventspils (Latvia)	4–0	(Faroe Islands) Víkingur Gøta	2–0	2–0
Linfield (Northern Ireland)	1–2	(Republic of Ireland) Cork City	0–1	1–1
Levadia Tallinn (Estonia)	3–1	(Faroe Islands) HB	1–1	2–0
Atlantas (Lithuania)	1–3	(Finland) HJK	0–2	1–1
IFK Göteborg (Sweden)	7–1	(Wales) Llandudno	5–0	2–1
St Patrick's Athletic (Republic of Ireland)	2–2 (a)	(Luxembourg) Jeunesse Esch	1–0	1–2
KR (Iceland)	8–1	(Northern Ireland) Glenavon	2–1	6–0
Shamrock Rovers (Republic of Ireland)	1–3	(Finland) RoPS	0–2	1–1
Valur (Iceland)	1–10	(Denmark) Brøndby	1–4	0–6
Aberdeen (Scotland)	3–2	(Luxembourg) Fola Esch	3–1	0–1
Trakai (Lithuania)	3–5	(Estonia) Nõmme Kalju	2–1	1–4
Dinamo Minsk (Belarus)	4–1	(Latvia) Spartaks Jūrmala	2–1	2–0
Breiðablik (Iceland)	4–5	(Latvia) Jelgava	2–3	2–2
NSÍ (Faroe Islands)	0–7	(Belarus) Shakhtyor Soligorsk	0–2	0–5
AIK (Sweden)	4–0	(Wales) Bala Town	2–0	2–0
Differdange 03 (Luxembourg)	1–3	(Northern Ireland) Cliftonville	1–1	0–2
Odd (Norway)	3–1	(Finland) Mariehamn	2–0	1–1
Domžale (Slovenia)	5–2	(Andorra) Lusitanos	3–1	2–1
Bokelj (Montenegro)	1–6	(Serbia) Vojvodina	1–1	0–5
AEK Larnaca (Cyprus)	6–1	(San Marino) Folgore	3–0	3–1
Dila Gori (Georgia (country))	1–1 (1–4 p)	(Armenia) Shirak	1–0	0–1 (a.e.t.)
Široki Brijeg (Bosnia and Herzegovina)	1–3	(Malta) Birkirkara	1–1	0–2
Videoton (Hungary)	3–2	(Moldova) Zaria Bălți	3–0	0–2
UE Santa Coloma (Andorra)	2–7	(Croatia) Lokomotiva Zagreb	1–3	1–4
Europa (Gibraltar)	3–2	(Armenia) Pyunik	2–0	1–2
Čukarički (Serbia)	6–3	(Kazakhstan) Ordabasy	3–0	3–3
Rabotnicki (North Macedonia)	1–2	(Montenegro) Budućnost Podgorica	1–1	0–1
Zimbru Chișinău (Moldova)	3–3 (a)	(Georgia (country)) Chikhura Sachkhere	0–1	3–2
Sloboda Tuzla (Bosnia and Herzegovina)	0–1	(Israel) Beitar Jerusalem	0–0	0–1
Kukësi (Albania)	2–1	(Montenegro) Rudar Pljevlja	1–1	1–0
Balzan (Malta)	2–3	(Azerbaijan) Neftçi	0–2	2–1
Admira Wacker Mödling (Austria)	4–3	(Slovakia) Spartak Myjava	1–1	3–2
Beroe Stara Zagora (Bulgaria)	2–0	(Bosnia and Herzegovina) Radnik Bijeljina	0–0	2–0
La Fiorita (San Marino)	0–7	(Hungary) Debrecen	0–5	0–2
Vaduz (Liechtenstein)	5–2	(North Macedonia) Sileks	3–1	2–1
Maccabi Tel Aviv (Israel)	4–0	(Slovenia) Gorica	3–0	1–0
Gabala (Azerbaijan)	6–3	(Georgia (country)) Samtredia	5–1	1–2
Teuta (Albania)	0–6	(Kazakhstan) Kairat	0–1	0–5
Spartak Trnava (Slovakia)	6–0	(Malta) Hibernians	3–0	3–0
Banants (Armenia)	1–5	(Cyprus) Omonia	0–1	1–4 (a.e.t.)
Shkëndija (North Macedonia)	4–1	(Poland) Cracovia	2–0	2–1
Slavia Sofia (Bulgaria)	1–3	(Poland) Zagłębie Lubin	1–0	0–3
Aktobe (Kazakhstan)	1–3	(Hungary) MTK Budapest	1–1	0–2
Partizani (Albania)	w/o (Note: Partizani replaced Skënderbeu in the 2016–17 UEFA Champions League second qualifying round and Slovan Bratislava proceeded directly to the UEFA Europa League second qualifying round, after Skënderbeu was excluded by UEFA for match-fixing.)	(Slovakia) Slovan Bratislava	0–0	Canc.
Kapaz (Azerbaijan)	1–0	(Moldova) Dacia Chișinău	0–0	1–0

=== Second qualifying round ===
The first legs were played on 14 July, and the second legs were played on 20 and 21 July 2016.

Team 1	Agg.	Team 2	1st leg	2nd leg
Shirak (Armenia)	1–3	(Slovakia) Spartak Trnava	1–1	0–2
Dinamo Minsk (Belarus)	2–1	(Republic of Ireland) St Patrick's Athletic	1–1	1–0
Partizan (Serbia)	0–0 (3–4 p)	(Poland) Zagłębie Lubin	0–0	0–0 (a.e.t.)
Vojvodina (Serbia)	3–1	(Wales) Connah's Quay Nomads	1–0	2–1
Maccabi Haifa (Israel)	2–2 (3–5 p) (Note: Order of legs reversed after original draw.)	(Estonia) Nõmme Kalju	1–1	1–1 (a.e.t.)
Hibernian (Scotland)	1–1 (3–5 p)	(Denmark) Brøndby	0–1	1–0 (a.e.t.)
Shakhtyor Soligorsk (Belarus)	2–3	(Slovenia) Domžale	1–1	1–2
Austria Wien	5–1	(Albania) Kukësi	1–0	4–1
MTK Budapest (Hungary)	1–4	(Azerbaijan) Gabala	1–2	0–2
Beroe Stara Zagora (Bulgaria)	1–2	(Finland) HJK	1–1	0–1
RoPS (Finland)	1–4	(Croatia) Lokomotiva Zagreb	1–1	0–3
Neftçi (Azerbaijan)	0–1	(North Macedonia) Shkëndija	0–0	0–1
KR (Iceland)	4–5	(Switzerland) Grasshopper	3–3	1–2
Midtjylland (Denmark)	5–2	(Liechtenstein) Vaduz	3–0	2–2
Zimbru Chișinău (Moldova)	2–7	(Turkey) Osmanlıspor	2–2	0–5
PAS Giannina (Greece)	4–3	(Norway) Odd	3–0	1–3 (a.e.t.)
Birkirkara (Malta)	2–1	(Scotland) Heart of Midlothian	0–0	2–1
Maribor (Slovenia)	1–1 (a)	(Bulgaria) Levski Sofia	0–0	1–1
Piast Gliwice (Poland)	0–3	(Sweden) IFK Göteborg	0–3	0–0
Slovan Bratislava (Slovakia)	0–3	(Latvia) Jelgava	0–0	0–3
Beitar Jerusalem (Israel)	3–3 (a)	(Cyprus) Omonia	1–0	2–3
Admira Wacker Mödling (Austria)	3–0	(Azerbaijan) Kapaz	1–0	2–0
Aberdeen (Scotland)	4–0	(Latvia) Ventspils	3–0	1–0
BK Häcken (Sweden)	1–2	(Republic of Ireland) Cork City	1–1	0–1
Kairat (Kazakhstan)	2–3	(Israel) Maccabi Tel Aviv	1–1	1–2
Debrecen (Hungary)	1–3	(Belarus) Torpedo-BelAZ Zhodino	1–2	0–1
CSM Politehnica Iași (Romania)	3–4	(Croatia) Hajduk Split	2–2	1–2
Videoton (Hungary)	3–1	(Serbia) Čukarički	2–0	1–1
Cliftonville (Northern Ireland)	2–5	(Cyprus) AEK Larnaca	2–3	0–2
AIK (Sweden)	2–0	(Gibraltar) Europa	1–0	1–0
Levadia Tallinn (Estonia)	3–3 (a)	(Czech Republic) Slavia Prague	3–1	0–2
Genk (Belgium)	2–2 (4–2 p)	(Montenegro) Budućnost Podgorica	2–0	0–2 (a.e.t.)
SønderjyskE (Denmark)	4–3	(Norway) Strømsgodset	2–1	2–2 (a.e.t.)

=== Third qualifying round ===
The draw for the third qualifying round was held on 15 July 2016. The first legs were played on 28 July, and the second legs were played on 3 and 4 August 2016.

Team 1	Agg.	Team 2	1st leg	2nd leg
Lokomotiva Zagreb (Croatia)	3–2	(Ukraine) Vorskla Poltava	0–0	3–2
Saint-Étienne (France)	1–0	(Greece) AEK Athens	0–0	1–0
AEK Larnaca (Cyprus)	2–1	(Russia) Spartak Moscow	1–1	1–0
Pandurii Târgu Jiu (Romania)	2–5	(Israel) Maccabi Tel Aviv	1–3	1–2
Vojvodina (Serbia)	3–1	(Belarus) Dinamo Minsk	1–1	2–0
Zagłębie Lubin (Poland)	2–3	(Denmark) SønderjyskE	1–2	1–1
Luzern (Switzerland)	1–4	(Italy) Sassuolo	1–1	0–3
Slavia Prague (Czech Republic)	1–1 (a)	(Portugal) Rio Ave	0–0	1–1
Birkirkara (Malta)	1–6	(Russia) Krasnodar	0–3	1–3
AZ (Netherlands)	3–1	(Greece) PAS Giannina	1–0	2–1
Jelgava (Latvia)	1–4	(Israel) Beitar Jerusalem	1–1	0–3
Austria Wien	1–1 (5–4 p)	(Slovakia) Spartak Trnava	0–1	1–0 (a.e.t.)
Panathinaikos (Greece)	3–0 (Note: Order of legs reversed after original draw.)	(Sweden) AIK	1–0	2–0
Osmanlıspor (Turkey)	3–0	(Estonia) Nõmme Kalju	1–0	2–0
Aberdeen (Scotland)	1–2	(Slovenia) Maribor	1–1	0–1
Lille (France)	1–2	(Azerbaijan) Gabala	1–1	0–1
Oleksandriya (Ukraine)	1–6	(Croatia) Hajduk Split	0–3	1–3
Hertha BSC (Germany)	2–3	(Denmark) Brøndby	1–0	1–3
İstanbul Başakşehir (Turkey)	2–2 (a)	(Croatia) Rijeka	0–0	2–2
Heracles Almelo (Netherlands)	1–1 (a)	(Portugal) Arouca	1–1	0–0
Torpedo-BelAZ Zhodino (Belarus)	0–3	(Austria) Rapid Wien	0–0	0–3
Genk (Belgium)	3–1	(Republic of Ireland) Cork City	1–0	2–1
Shkëndija (North Macedonia)	2–1	(Czech Republic) Mladá Boleslav	2–0	0–1
Domžale (Slovenia)	2–4	(England) West Ham United	2–1	0–3
Videoton (Hungary)	1–2	(Denmark) Midtjylland	0–1	1–1 (a.e.t.)
IFK Göteborg (Sweden)	3–2	(Finland) HJK	1–2	2–0
Admira Wacker Mödling (Austria)	1–4	(Czech Republic) Slovan Liberec	1–2	0–2
Gent (Belgium)	5–0	(Romania) Viitorul Constanța	5–0	0–0
Grasshopper (Switzerland)	5–4	(Cyprus) Apollon Limassol	2–1	3–3 (a.e.t.)

== Play-off round ==
The draw for the play-off round was held on 5 August 2016. The first legs were played on 17 and 18 August, and the second legs were played on 25 August 2016. The first legs were played on 17 and 18 August, and the second legs were played on 25 August 2016.

Team 1	Agg.	Team 2	1st leg	2nd leg
Astana (Kazakhstan)	4–2	(Belarus) BATE Borisov	2–0	2–2
Arouca (Portugal)	1–3	(Greece) Olympiacos	0–1	1–2 (a.e.t.)
Midtjylland (Denmark)	0–3	(Turkey) Osmanlıspor	0–1	0–2
Trenčín (Slovakia)	2–4	(Austria) Rapid Wien	0–4	2–0
Lokomotiva Zagreb (Croatia)	2–4	(Belgium) Genk	2–2	0–2
AEK Larnaca (Cyprus)	0–4	(Czech Republic) Slovan Liberec	0–1	0–3
Dinamo Tbilisi (Georgia (country))	0–5	(Greece) PAOK	0–3	0–2
Austria Wien	4–2	(Norway) Rosenborg	2–1	2–1
Beitar Jerusalem (Israel)	1–2	(France) Saint-Étienne	1–2	0–0
Vojvodina (Serbia)	0–3	(Netherlands) AZ	0–3	0–0
Gabala (Azerbaijan)	3–2 (Note: Order of legs reversed after original draw.)	(Slovenia) Maribor	3–1	0–1
Slavia Prague (Czech Republic)	0–6	(Belgium) Anderlecht	0–3	0–3
Astra Giurgiu (Romania)	2–1	(England) West Ham United	1–1	1–0
Fenerbahçe (Turkey)	5–0	(Switzerland) Grasshopper	3–0	2–0
Panathinaikos (Greece)	4–1	(Denmark) Brøndby	3–0	1–1
Krasnodar (Russia)	4–0	(Albania) Partizani	4–0	0–0
Gent (Belgium)	6–1	(North Macedonia) Shkëndija	2–1	4–0
İstanbul Başakşehir (Turkey)	1–4	(Ukraine) Shakhtar Donetsk	1–2	0–2
SønderjyskE (Denmark)	2–3	(Czech Republic) Sparta Prague	0–0	2–3
Sassuolo (Italy)	4–1	(Serbia) Red Star Belgrade	3–0	1–1
IFK Göteborg (Sweden)	1–3	(Azerbaijan) Qarabağ	1–0	0–3
Maccabi Tel Aviv (Israel)	3–3 (4–3 p)	(Croatia) Hajduk Split	2–1	1–2 (a.e.t.)

== Group stage ==
Location of teams of the 2016–17 UEFA Europa League group stage.
Red: Group A; Yellow: Group B; Green: Group C; Dark Green: Group D;
Purple: Group E; Pink: Group F; Blue: Group G; Orange: Group H;
Brown: Group I; Deep pink: Group J; Cyan: Group K; Spring green: Group L.

The draw for the group stage was held on 26 August 2016, at the Grimaldi Forum in Monaco. The 48 teams were drawn into twelve groups of four, with the restriction that teams from the same association could not be drawn against each other. For the draw, the teams were seeded into four pots based on their 2016 UEFA club coefficients.

In each group, teams play against each other home-and-away in a round-robin format. The group winners and runners-up advance to the round of 32, where they are joined by the eight third-placed teams of the 2016–17 UEFA Champions League group stage. The matchdays are 15 September, 29 September, 20 October, 3 November, 24 November, and 8 December 2016.

A total of 21 national associations are represented in the group stage. Astana, Celta Vigo, Dundalk, Hapoel Be'er Sheva, Konyaspor, Mainz 05, Manchester United, Nice, Olympiacos, Osmanlıspor, Sassuolo, Southampton and Zorya Luhansk made their debut appearances in the UEFA Europa League group stage (although Celta Vigo and Olympiacos had appeared in the UEFA Cup group stage and Manchester United and Olympiacos had already competed in the UEFA Europa League knockout phase after a third place in the UEFA Champions League group stage). Furthermore, Dundalk, Hapoel Be'er Sheva, Mainz, Konyaspor, Nice, Osmanlispor, Sassuolo, Southampton and Zorya Luhansk made their debuts in any major European group stage. Also, Sassuolo made their debut appearances in European football.

Location of Benelux teams of the 2016–17 UEFA Europa League group stage.
Red: Group A; Green: Group C; Dark Green: Group D; Pink: Group F; Blue: Group G; Orange: Group H.

Tiebreakers
The teams are ranked according to points (3 points for a win, 1 point for a draw, 0 points for a loss). If two or more teams are equal on points on completion of the group matches, the following criteria are applied in the order given to determine the rankings (regulations Article 16.01):
1. higher number of points obtained in the group matches played among the teams in question;
2. superior goal difference from the group matches played among the teams in question;
3. higher number of goals scored in the group matches played among the teams in question;
4. higher number of goals scored away from home in the group matches played among the teams in question;
5. if, after having applied criteria 1 to 4, teams still have an equal ranking, criteria 1 to 4 are reapplied exclusively to the matches between the teams in question to determine their final rankings. If this procedure does not lead to a decision, criteria 6 to 12 apply;
6. superior goal difference in all group matches;
7. higher number of goals scored in all group matches;
8. higher number of away goals scored in all group matches;
9. higher number of wins in all group matches;
10. higher number of away wins in all group matches;
11. lower disciplinary points total based only on yellow and red cards received in all group matches (red card = 3 points, yellow card = 1 point, expulsion for two yellow cards in one match = 3 points);
12. higher club coefficient.

=== Group A ===
Pos	Team	Pld	W	D	L	GF	GA	GD	Pts	Qualification	FEN	MU	FEY	ZOR
1	(Turkey) Fenerbahçe	6	4	1	1	8	6	+2	13	Advance to knockout phase	—	2–1	1–0	2–0
2	(England) Manchester United	6	4	0	2	12	4	+8	12	Advance to knockout phase	4–1	—	4–0	1–0
3	(Netherlands) Feyenoord	6	2	1	3	3	7	−4	7		0–1	1–0	—	1–0
4	(Ukraine) Zorya Luhansk	6	0	2	4	2	8	−6	2		1–1	0–2	1–1	—

Source: UEFA

=== Group B ===
Pos	Team	Pld	W	D	L	GF	GA	GD	Pts	Qualification	APO	OLY	YB	AST
1	(Cyprus) APOEL	6	4	0	2	8	6	+2	12	Advance to knockout phase	—	2–0	1–0	2–1
2	(Greece) Olympiacos	6	2	2	2	7	6	+1	8	Advance to knockout phase	0–1	—	1–1	4–1
3	(Switzerland) Young Boys	6	2	2	2	7	4	+3	8		3–1	0–1	—	3–0
4	(Kazakhstan) Astana	6	1	2	3	5	11	−6	5		2–1	1–1	0–0	—

Source: UEFA

=== Group C ===
Pos	Team	Pld	W	D	L	GF	GA	GD	Pts	Qualification	SET	AND	MNZ	QAB
1	(France) Saint-Étienne	6	3	3	0	8	5	+3	12	Advance to knockout phase	—	1–1	0–0	1–0
2	(Belgium) Anderlecht	6	3	2	1	16	8	+8	11	Advance to knockout phase	2–3	—	6–1	3–1
3	(Germany) Mainz 05	6	2	3	1	8	10	−2	9		1–1	1–1	—	2–0
4	(Azerbaijan) Gabala	6	0	0	6	5	14	−9	0		1–2	1–3	2–3	—

Source: UEFA

=== Group D ===
Pos	Team	Pld	W	D	L	GF	GA	GD	Pts	Qualification	ZEN	AZ	MTA	DUN
1	(Russia) Zenit Saint Petersburg	6	5	0	1	17	8	+9	15	Advance to knockout phase	—	5–0	2–0	2–1
2	(Netherlands) AZ	6	2	2	2	6	10	−4	8	Advance to knockout phase	3–2	—	1–2	1–1
3	(Israel) Maccabi Tel Aviv	6	2	1	3	7	9	−2	7		3–4	0–0	—	2–1
4	(Republic of Ireland) Dundalk	6	1	1	4	5	8	−3	4		1–2	0–1	1–0	—

Source: UEFA

=== Group E ===
Pos	Team	Pld	W	D	L	GF	GA	GD	Pts	Qualification	ROM	AG	PLZ	AW
1	(Italy) Roma	6	3	3	0	16	7	+9	12	Advance to knockout phase	—	4–0	4–1	3–3
2	(Romania) Astra Giurgiu	6	2	2	2	7	10	−3	8	Advance to knockout phase	0–0	—	1–1	2–3
3	(Czech Republic) Viktoria Plzeň	6	1	3	2	7	10	−3	6		1–1	1–2	—	3–2
4	Austria Wien	6	1	2	3	11	14	−3	5		2–4	1–2	0–0	—

Source: UEFA

=== Group F ===
Pos	Team	Pld	W	D	L	GF	GA	GD	Pts	Qualification	GNK	ATH	RW	SAS
1	(Belgium) Genk	6	4	0	2	13	9	+4	12	Advance to knockout phase	—	2–0	1–0	3–1
2	(Spain) Athletic Bilbao	6	3	1	2	10	11	−1	10	Advance to knockout phase	5–3	—	1–0	3–2
3	(Austria) Rapid Wien	6	1	3	2	7	8	−1	6		3–2	1–1	—	1–1
4	(Italy) Sassuolo	6	1	2	3	9	11	−2	5		0–2	3–0	2–2	—

Source: UEFA

=== Group G ===
Pos	Team	Pld	W	D	L	GF	GA	GD	Pts	Qualification	AJX	CLT	STL	PAN
1	(Netherlands) Ajax	6	4	2	0	11	6	+5	14	Advance to knockout phase	—	3–2	1–0	2–0
2	(Spain) Celta Vigo	6	2	3	1	10	7	+3	9	Advance to knockout phase	2–2	—	1–1	2–0
3	(Belgium) Standard Liège	6	1	4	1	8	6	+2	7		1–1	1–1	—	2–2
4	(Greece) Panathinaikos	6	0	1	5	3	13	−10	1		1–2	0–2	0–3	—

Source: UEFA

=== Group H ===
Pos	Team	Pld	W	D	L	GF	GA	GD	Pts	Qualification	SHK	GNT	BRA	KON
1	(Ukraine) Shakhtar Donetsk	6	6	0	0	21	5	+16	18	Advance to knockout phase	—	5–0	2–0	4–0
2	(Belgium) Gent	6	2	2	2	9	13	−4	8	Advance to knockout phase	3–5	—	2–2	2–0
3	(Portugal) Braga	6	1	3	2	9	11	−2	6		2–4	1–1	—	3–1
4	(Turkey) Konyaspor	6	0	1	5	2	12	−10	1		0–1	0–1	1–1	—

Source: UEFA

=== Group I ===
Pos	Team	Pld	W	D	L	GF	GA	GD	Pts	Qualification	SCH	KRA	SAL	NCE
1	(Germany) Schalke 04	6	5	0	1	9	3	+6	15	Advance to knockout phase	—	2–0	3–1	2–0
2	(Russia) Krasnodar	6	2	1	3	8	8	0	7	Advance to knockout phase	0–1	—	1–1	5–2
3	(Austria) Red Bull Salzburg	6	2	1	3	6	6	0	7		2–0	0–1	—	0–1
4	(France) Nice	6	2	0	4	5	11	−6	6		0–1	2–1	0–2	—

Source: UEFA

=== Group J ===
Pos	Team	Pld	W	D	L	GF	GA	GD	Pts	Qualification	FIO	PAOK	QRB	LIB
1	(Italy) Fiorentina	6	4	1	1	15	6	+9	13	Advance to knockout phase	—	2–3	5–1	3–0
2	(Greece) PAOK	6	3	1	2	7	6	+1	10	Advance to knockout phase	0–0	—	0–1	2–0
3	(Azerbaijan) Qarabağ	6	2	1	3	7	12	−5	7		1–2	2–0	—	2–2
4	(Czech Republic) Slovan Liberec	6	1	1	4	7	12	−5	4		1–3	1–2	3–0	—

Source: UEFA

=== Group K ===
Pos	Team	Pld	W	D	L	GF	GA	GD	Pts	Qualification	SPP	HBS	SOU	INT
1	(Czech Republic) Sparta Prague	6	4	0	2	8	6	+2	12	Advance to knockout phase	—	2–0	1–0	3–1
2	(Israel) Hapoel Be'er Sheva	6	2	2	2	6	6	0	8	Advance to knockout phase	0–1	—	0–0	3–2
3	(England) Southampton	6	2	2	2	6	4	+2	8		3–0	1–1	—	2–1
4	(Italy) Internazionale	6	2	0	4	7	11	−4	6		2–1	0–2	1–0	—

Source: UEFA

=== Group L ===
Pos	Team	Pld	W	D	L	GF	GA	GD	Pts	Qualification	OSM	VIL	ZUR	STE
1	(Turkey) Osmanlıspor	6	3	1	2	10	7	+3	10	Advance to knockout phase	—	2–2	2–0	2–0
2	(Spain) Villarreal	6	2	3	1	9	8	+1	9	Advance to knockout phase	1–2	—	2–1	2–1
3	(Switzerland) Zürich	6	1	3	2	5	7	−2	6		2–1	1–1	—	0–0
4	(Romania) Steaua București	6	1	3	2	5	7	−2	6		2–1	1–1	1–1	—

Source: UEFA

== Knockout phase ==
In the knockout phase, teams play against each other over two legs on a home-and-away basis, except for the one-match final. The mechanism of the draws for each round is as follows:

- In the draw for the round of 32, the twelve group winners and the four third-placed teams from the Champions League group stage with the better group records are seeded, and the twelve group runners-up and the other four third-placed teams from the Champions League group stage are unseeded. The seeded teams are drawn against the unseeded teams, with the seeded teams hosting the second leg. Teams from the same group or the same association cannot be drawn against each other.
- In the draws for the round of 16 onwards, there are no seedings, and teams from the same group or the same association can be drawn against each other.

=== Bracket ===
Round of 32
(Bulgaria) Ludogorets Razgrad	1	0	1
(Denmark) Copenhagen	2	0	2
(Poland) Legia Warsaw	0	0	0
(Netherlands) Ajax	0	1	1
(Greece) PAOK	0	1	1
(Germany) Schalke 04	3	1	4
(Germany) Borussia Mönchengladbach	0	4	4
(Italy) Fiorentina	1	2	3
(Netherlands) AZ	1	1	2
(France) Lyon	4	7	11
(Spain) Villarreal	0	1	1
(Italy) Roma	4	0	4
(Greece) Olympiacos	0	3	3
(Turkey) Osmanlıspor	0	0	0
(Israel) Hapoel Be'er Sheva	1	1	2
(Turkey) Beşiktaş	3	2	5
(Spain) Celta Vigo (a.e.t.)	0	2	2
(Ukraine) Shakhtar Donetsk	1	0	1
(Russia) Krasnodar	1	1	2
(Turkey) Fenerbahçe	0	1	1
(Belgium) Gent	1	2	3
(England) Tottenham Hotspur	0	2	2
(Romania) Astra Giurgiu	2	0	2
(Belgium) Genk	2	1	3
(Spain) Athletic Bilbao	3	0	3
(Cyprus) APOEL	2	2	4
(Belgium) Anderlecht (a)	2	1	3
(Russia) Zenit Saint Petersburg	0	3	3
(Russia) Rostov	4	1	5
(Czech Republic) Sparta Prague	0	1	1
(England) Manchester United	3	1	4
(France) Saint-Étienne	0	0	0

Round of 16
(Denmark) Copenhagen	2	0	2
(Netherlands) Ajax	1	2	3
(Germany) Schalke 04 (a)	1	2	3
(Germany) Borussia Mönchengladbach	1	2	3
(France) Lyon	4	1	5
(Italy) Roma	2	2	4
(Greece) Olympiacos	1	1	2
(Turkey) Beşiktaş	1	4	5
(Spain) Celta Vigo	2	2	4
(Russia) Krasnodar	1	0	1
(Belgium) Gent	2	1	3
(Belgium) Genk	5	1	6
(Cyprus) APOEL	0	0	0
(Belgium) Anderlecht	1	1	2
(Russia) Rostov	1	0	1
(England) Manchester United	1	1	2

Quarter-finals
(Netherlands) Ajax (a.e.t.)	2	2	4
(Germany) Schalke 04	0	3	3
(France) Lyon (p)	2	1	3 (7)
(Turkey) Beşiktaş	1	2	3 (6)
(Spain) Celta Vigo	3	1	4
(Belgium) Genk	2	1	3
(Belgium) Anderlecht	1	1	2
(England) Manchester United (a.e.t.)	1	2	3

Semi-finals
(Netherlands) Ajax	4	1	5
(France) Lyon	1	3	4
(Spain) Celta Vigo	0	1	1
(England) Manchester United	1	1	2

Final
24 May – Solna
(Netherlands) Ajax	0
(England) Manchester United	2

=== Round of 32 ===
The draw for the round of 32 was held on 12 December 2016. The first legs were played on 16 February, and the second legs were played on 22 and 23 February 2017.

Team 1	Agg.	Team 2	1st leg	2nd leg
Athletic Bilbao (Spain)	3–4	(Cyprus) APOEL	3–2	0–2
Legia Warsaw (Poland)	0–1	(Netherlands) Ajax	0–0	0–1
Anderlecht (Belgium)	3–3 (a)	(Russia) Zenit Saint Petersburg	2–0	1–3
Astra Giurgiu (Romania)	2–3	(Belgium) Genk	2–2	0–1
Manchester United (England)	4–0	(France) Saint-Étienne	3–0	1–0
Villarreal (Spain)	1–4	(Italy) Roma	0–4	1–0
Ludogorets Razgrad (Bulgaria)	1–2	(Denmark) Copenhagen	1–2	0–0
Celta Vigo (Spain)	2–1	(Ukraine) Shakhtar Donetsk	0–1	2–0 (a.e.t.)
Olympiacos (Greece)	3–0	(Turkey) Osmanlıspor	0–0	3–0
Gent (Belgium)	3–2	(England) Tottenham Hotspur	1–0	2–2
Rostov (Russia)	5–1	(Czech Republic) Sparta Prague	4–0	1–1
Krasnodar (Russia)	2–1	(Turkey) Fenerbahçe	1–0	1–1
Borussia Mönchengladbach (Germany)	4–3	(Italy) Fiorentina	0–1	4–2
AZ (Netherlands)	2–11	(France) Lyon	1–4	1–7
Hapoel Be'er Sheva (Israel)	2–5	(Turkey) Beşiktaş	1–3	1–2
PAOK (Greece)	1–4	(Germany) Schalke 04	0–3	1–1

=== Round of 16 ===
The draw for the round of 16 was held on 24 February 2017. The first legs were played on 9 March, and the second legs were played on 16 March 2017.

Team 1	Agg.	Team 2	1st leg	2nd leg
Celta Vigo (Spain)	4–1	(Russia) Krasnodar	2–1	2–0
APOEL (Cyprus)	0–2	(Belgium) Anderlecht	0–1	0–1
Schalke 04 (Germany)	3–3 (a)	(Germany) Borussia Mönchengladbach	1–1	2–2
Lyon (France)	5–4	(Italy) Roma	4–2	1–2
Rostov (Russia)	1–2	(England) Manchester United	1–1	0–1
Olympiacos (Greece)	2–5	(Turkey) Beşiktaş	1–1	1–4
Gent (Belgium)	3–6	(Belgium) Genk	2–5	1–1
Copenhagen (Denmark)	2–3	(Netherlands) Ajax	2–1	0–2

=== Quarter-finals ===
The draw for the quarter-finals was held on 17 March 2017. The first legs were played on 13 April, and the second legs were played on 20 April 2017.

Team 1	Agg.	Team 2	1st leg	2nd leg
Anderlecht (Belgium)	2–3	(England) Manchester United	1–1	1–2 (a.e.t.)
Celta Vigo (Spain)	4–3	(Belgium) Genk	3–2	1–1
Ajax (Netherlands)	4–3	(Germany) Schalke 04	2–0	2–3 (a.e.t.)
Lyon (France)	3–3 (7–6 p)	(Turkey) Beşiktaş	2–1	1–2 (a.e.t.)

=== Semi-finals ===
The draw for the semi-finals was held on 21 April 2017. The first legs were played on 3 and 4 May, and the second legs were played on 11 May 2017.

Team 1	Agg.	Team 2	1st leg	2nd leg
Ajax (Netherlands)	5–4	(France) Lyon	4–1	1–3
Celta Vigo (Spain)	1–2	(England) Manchester United	0–1	1–1

=== Final ===
The final was played on 24 May 2017 at Friends Arena in Solna, Sweden. The "home" team (for administrative purposes) was determined by an additional draw held after the semi-final draw.

24 May 2017
20:45 UTC+2

Ajax (Netherlands)	0–2	(England) Manchester United
	Report	Pogba 18'; Mkhitaryan 48'

Friends Arena, Solna
Attendance: 46,961
Referee: Damir Skomina (Slovenia)

== Statistics ==
Statistics exclude qualifying rounds and play-off round.

=== Top goalscorers ===
Rank	Player	Team	Goals	Minutes played
1	(Bosnia and Herzegovina) Edin Džeko	(Italy) Roma	8	524
1	(Brazil) Giuliano	(Russia) Zenit Saint Petersburg	8	710
3	(Spain) Aritz Aduriz	(Spain) Athletic Bilbao	7	484
4	(France) Alexandre Lacazette	(France) Lyon	6	537
4	(Armenia) Henrikh Mkhitaryan	(England) Manchester United	6	817
4	(Denmark) Kasper Dolberg	(Netherlands) Ajax	6	933
7	(France) Guillaume Hoarau	(Switzerland) Young Boys	5	342
7	(Croatia) Nikola Kalinić	(Italy) Fiorentina	5	496
7	(Poland) Łukasz Teodorczyk	(Belgium) Anderlecht	5	673
7	(Spain) Iago Aspas	(Spain) Celta Vigo	5	865
7	(Sweden) Zlatan Ibrahimović	(England) Manchester United	5	897

=== Top assists ===
Rank	Player	Team	Assists	Minutes played
1	(Czech Republic) Bořek Dočkal	(Czech Republic) Sparta Prague	6	537
2	(Italy) Francesco Totti	(Italy) Roma	5	384
2	(Brazil) Giuliano	(Russia) Zenit Saint Petersburg	5	710
4	(Croatia) Nikola Kalinić	(Italy) Fiorentina	4	496
4	(Brazil) Talisca	(Turkey) Beşiktaş	4	496
4	(France) Nabil Fekir	(France) Lyon	4	518
4	(Brazil) Marlos	(Ukraine) Shakhtar Donetsk	4	612
4	(Algeria) Sofiane Hanni	(Belgium) Anderlecht	4	674
4	(England) Marcus Rashford	(England) Manchester United	4	767
4	(Sweden) Zlatan Ibrahimović	(England) Manchester United	4	897
4	(Spain) Alejandro Pozuelo	(Belgium) Genk	4	928
4	(Morocco) Hakim Ziyech	(Netherlands) Ajax	4	998
4	(Burkina Faso) Bertrand Traoré	(Netherlands) Ajax	4	1106

=== Squad of the season ===
The UEFA technical study group selected the following 18 players as the squad of the tournament.

Pos.	Player	Team
GK	(Spain) Sergio Álvarez	(Spain) Celta Vigo
GK	(Argentina) Sergio Romero	(England) Manchester United
DF	(Ivory Coast) Eric Bailly	(England) Manchester United
DF	(Argentina) Gustavo Cabral	(Spain) Celta Vigo
DF	(France) Jérémy Morel	(France) Lyon
DF	(Netherlands) Matthijs de Ligt	(Netherlands) Ajax
DF	(Netherlands) Daley Blind	(England) Manchester United
DF	(Ecuador) Antonio Valencia	(England) Manchester United
MF	(Chile) Pablo Hernández	(Spain) Celta Vigo
MF	(Spain) Ander Herrera	(England) Manchester United
MF	(France) Paul Pogba	(England) Manchester United
MF	(Belgium) Youri Tielemans	(Belgium) Anderlecht
MF	(France) Corentin Tolisso	(France) Lyon
MF	(Armenia) Henrikh Mkhitaryan	(England) Manchester United
MF	(Germany) Amin Younes	(Netherlands) Ajax
FW	(Sweden) Zlatan Ibrahimović	(England) Manchester United
FW	(France) Alexandre Lacazette	(France) Lyon
FW	(Burkina Faso) Bertrand Traoré	(Netherlands) Ajax

=== Player of the season ===
A new UEFA Europa League Player of the Season award was introduced for the 2016–17 season. Votes were cast by coaches of the 48 teams in the group stage, together with 55 journalists selected by the European Sports Media (ESM) group, representing each of UEFA's member associations. The coaches were not allowed to vote for players from their own teams. Jury members selected their top three players, with the first receiving five points, the second three and the third one. The shortlist of the top three players were announced on 4 August 2017. The award winner was announced and presented to during the 2017–18 UEFA Europa League group stage draw in Monaco on 25 August 2017.

Rank	Player	Team	Points
Shortlist of top three
1	(France) Paul Pogba	(England) Manchester United	140
2	(Armenia) Henrikh Mkhitaryan	(England) Manchester United	129
3	(Sweden) Zlatan Ibrahimović	(England) Manchester United	109
Players ranked 4–10
4	(France) Alexandre Lacazette	(France) Lyon	70
5	(Denmark) Kasper Dolberg	(Netherlands) Ajax	40
6	(England) Marcus Rashford	(England) Manchester United	37
7	(Spain) Ander Herrera	(England) Manchester United	33
7	(Netherlands) Davy Klaassen	(Netherlands) Ajax	33
9	(Burkina Faso) Bertrand Traoré	(Netherlands) Ajax	28
10	(Bosnia and Herzegovina) Edin Džeko	(Italy) Roma	23

== See also ==
- 2016–17 UEFA Champions League
- 2017 UEFA Super Cup
