= 2016–17 UEFA Europa League qualifying (third and play-off round matches) =

European football competition

This page summarises the matches of the third qualifying and play-off rounds of 2016–17 UEFA Europa League qualifying.

Times are CEST (UTC+2), as listed by UEFA (local times, if different, are in parentheses).

== Third qualifying round ==
=== Summary ===
The first legs were played on 28 July, and the second legs were played on 3 and 4 August 2016.

Team 1	Agg.	Team 2	1st leg	2nd leg
Lokomotiva Zagreb (Croatia)	3–2	(Ukraine) Vorskla Poltava	0–0	3–2
Saint-Étienne (France)	1–0	(Greece) AEK Athens	0–0	1–0
AEK Larnaca (Cyprus)	2–1	(Russia) Spartak Moscow	1–1	1–0
Pandurii Târgu Jiu (Romania)	2–5	(Israel) Maccabi Tel Aviv	1–3	1–2
Vojvodina (Serbia)	3–1	(Belarus) Dinamo Minsk	1–1	2–0
Zagłębie Lubin (Poland)	2–3	(Denmark) SønderjyskE	1–2	1–1
Luzern (Switzerland)	1–4	(Italy) Sassuolo	1–1	0–3
Slavia Prague (Czech Republic)	1–1 (a)	(Portugal) Rio Ave	0–0	1–1
Birkirkara (Malta)	1–6	(Russia) Krasnodar	0–3	1–3
AZ (Netherlands)	3–1	(Greece) PAS Giannina	1–0	2–1
Jelgava (Latvia)	1–4	(Israel) Beitar Jerusalem	1–1	0–3
Austria Wien	1–1 (5–4 p)	(Slovakia) Spartak Trnava	0–1	1–0 (a.e.t.)
Panathinaikos (Greece)	3–0 (Note: Order of legs reversed after original draw.)	(Sweden) AIK	1–0	2–0
Osmanlıspor (Turkey)	3–0	(Estonia) Nõmme Kalju	1–0	2–0
Aberdeen (Scotland)	1–2	(Slovenia) Maribor	1–1	0–1
Lille (France)	1–2	(Azerbaijan) Gabala	1–1	0–1
Oleksandriya (Ukraine)	1–6	(Croatia) Hajduk Split	0–3	1–3
Hertha BSC (Germany)	2–3	(Denmark) Brøndby	1–0	1–3
İstanbul Başakşehir (Turkey)	2–2 (a)	(Croatia) Rijeka	0–0	2–2
Heracles Almelo (Netherlands)	1–1 (a)	(Portugal) Arouca	1–1	0–0
Torpedo-BelAZ Zhodino (Belarus)	0–3	(Austria) Rapid Wien	0–0	0–3
Genk (Belgium)	3–1	(Republic of Ireland) Cork City	1–0	2–1
Shkëndija (North Macedonia)	2–1	(Czech Republic) Mladá Boleslav	2–0	0–1
Domžale (Slovenia)	2–4	(England) West Ham United	2–1	0–3
Videoton (Hungary)	1–2	(Denmark) Midtjylland	0–1	1–1 (a.e.t.)
IFK Göteborg (Sweden)	3–2	(Finland) HJK	1–2	2–0
Admira Wacker Mödling (Austria)	1–4	(Czech Republic) Slovan Liberec	1–2	0–2
Gent (Belgium)	5–0	(Romania) Viitorul Constanța	5–0	0–0
Grasshopper (Switzerland)	5–4	(Cyprus) Apollon Limassol	2–1	3–3 (a.e.t.)

=== Matches ===
28 July 2016
19:00

Lokomotiva Zagreb (Croatia)	0–0	(Ukraine) Vorskla Poltava
	Report

Stadion Maksimir, Zagreb (Note: Lokomotiva played their third qualifying and play-off rounds home matches at Stadion Maksimir, Zagreb, instead of their regular stadium Stadion Kranjčevićeva, Zagreb.)
Attendance: 328
Referee: Harald Lechner (Austria)
4 August 2016
19:00

Vorskla Poltava (Ukraine)	2–3	(Croatia) Lokomotiva Zagreb
Perić 49' (o.g.); Chesnakov 74'	Report	Bočkaj 1'; Fiolić 53'; Perić 64'

Oleksiy Butovskyi Vorskla Stadium, Poltava
Attendance: 12,000
Referee: Orel Grinfeeld (Israel)

Lokomotiva Zagreb won 3–2 on aggregate.

28 July 2016
21:00

Saint-Étienne (France)	0–0	(Greece) AEK Athens
	Report

Stade Geoffroy-Guichard, Saint-Étienne
Attendance: 30,438
Referee: Antonio Damato (Italy)
4 August 2016
20:00

AEK Athens (Greece)	0–1	(France) Saint-Étienne
	Report	Berić 23'

Olympic Stadium, Athens
Attendance: 25,004
Referee: Alon Yefet (Israel)

Saint-Étienne won 1–0 on aggregate.

28 July 2016
17:00

AEK Larnaca (Cyprus)	1–1	(Russia) Spartak Moscow
Alves 65'	Report	Ananidze 38'

Antonis Papadopoulos Stadium, Larnaca (Note: AEK Larnaca played their home matches at Antonis Papadopoulos Stadium, Larnaca, instead of their regular stadium GSZ Stadium, Larnaca.)
Attendance: 4,323
Referee: Alejandro Hernández Hernández (Spain)
4 August 2016
18:30

Spartak Moscow (Russia)	0–1	(Cyprus) AEK Larnaca
	Report	Tričkovski 89'

Otkrytiye Arena, Moscow
Attendance: 24,017
Referee: Alexander Harkam (Austria)

AEK Larnaca won 2–1 on aggregate.

28 July 2016
20:00

Pandurii Târgu Jiu (Romania)	1–3	(Israel) Maccabi Tel Aviv
Herea 30'	Report	Ben Haim II 7'; Igiebor 49'; Micha 77'

Stadionul Municipal, Drobeta-Turnu Severin (Note: Pandurii Târgu Jiu played their home match at Stadionul Municipal, Drobeta-Turnu Severin, instead of their regular stadium Stadionul Tudor Vladimirescu, Târgu Jiu, due to renovations.)
Attendance: 4,058
Referee: Serhiy Boyko (Ukraine)
4 August 2016
19:30

Maccabi Tel Aviv (Israel)	2–1	(Romania) Pandurii Târgu Jiu
Igiebor 24'; Scarione 80'	Report	Pleașcă 57'

Netanya Stadium, Netanya (Note: Maccabi Tel Aviv played their home matches at Netanya Stadium, Netanya, instead of their regular stadium Bloomfield Stadium, Tel Aviv, due to reconstruction.)
Attendance: 8,126
Referee: Serge Gumienny (Belgium)

Maccabi Tel Aviv won 5–2 on aggregate.

28 July 2016
20:00

Vojvodina (Serbia)	1–1	(Belarus) Dinamo Minsk
Babić 29'	Report	Budnik 83'

Karađorđe Stadium, Novi Sad
Attendance: 8,346
Referee: Oliver Drachta (Austria)
4 August 2016
19:45

Dinamo Minsk (Belarus)	0–2	(Serbia) Vojvodina
	Report	Babić 32'; Antić 81'

Regional Sport Complex Brestsky, Brest (Note: Dinamo Minsk played their third qualifying round home match at Regional Sport Complex Brestsky, Brest, instead of their regular stadium Traktor Stadium, Minsk.)
Attendance: 7,500
Referee: Sébastien Delferière (Belgium)

Vojvodina won 3–1 on aggregate.

28 July 2016
19:00

Zagłębie Lubin (Poland)	1–2	(Denmark) SønderjyskE
Janoszka 45+2'	Report	Kroon 19'; Dal Hende 36'

Stadion Zagłębia Lubin, Lubin
Attendance: 10,271
Referee: Bobby Madley (England)
4 August 2016
19:15

SønderjyskE (Denmark)	1–1	(Poland) Zagłębie Lubin
Pedersen 65'	Report	Guldan 22'

Sydbank Park, Haderslev
Attendance: 4,795
Referee: Tamás Bognár (Hungary)

SønderjyskE won 3–2 on aggregate.

28 July 2016
19:45

Luzern (Switzerland)	1–1	(Italy) Sassuolo
M. Schneuwly 8'	Report	Berardi 42' (pen.)

Swissporarena, Lucerne
Attendance: 10,555
Referee: Andreas Ekberg (Sweden)
4 August 2016
20:30

Sassuolo (Italy)	3–0	(Switzerland) Luzern
Berardi 19', 39' (pen.); Defrel 64'	Report

Mapei Stadium – Città del Tricolore, Reggio Emilia
Attendance: 13,415
Referee: Ali Palabıyık (Turkey)

Sassuolo won 4–1 on aggregate.

28 July 2016
19:00

Slavia Prague (Czech Republic)	0–0	(Portugal) Rio Ave
	Report

Eden Arena, Prague
Attendance: 15,082
Referee: Sergey Lapochkin (Russia)
4 August 2016
21:00

Rio Ave (Portugal)	1–1	(Czech Republic) Slavia Prague
Ribeiro 57'	Report	Hušbauer 22'

Estádio dos Arcos, Vila do Conde
Attendance: 6,081
Referee: Andrew Dallas (Scotland)

1–1 on aggregate; Slavia Prague won on away goals.

28 July 2016
19:30

Birkirkara (Malta)	0–3	(Russia) Krasnodar
	Report	Granqvist 45+1'; Smolov 75' (pen.); Laborde 89'

Hibernians Stadium, Paola (Note: Birkirkara played their home matches at Hibernians Stadium, Paola, instead of their regular stadium National Stadium, Ta' Qali.)
Attendance: 1,560
Referee: Bart Vertenten (Belgium)
4 August 2016
18:30

Krasnodar (Russia)	3–1	(Malta) Birkirkara
Eboue 15'; Joãozinho 37'; Laborde 38'	Report	Jović 61'

Kuban Stadium, Krasnodar
Attendance: 7,256
Referee: Aliyar Aghayev (Azerbaijan)

Krasnodar won 6–1 on aggregate.

28 July 2016
20:45

AZ (Netherlands)	1–0	(Greece) PAS Giannina
Luckassen 36'	Report

AFAS Stadion, Alkmaar
Attendance: 9,156
Referee: Mattias Gestranius (Finland)
4 August 2016
20:00

PAS Giannina (Greece)	1–2	(Netherlands) AZ
Conde 9'	Report	Dabney 29'; Luckassen 36'

Peristeri Stadium, Peristeri (Note: PAS Giannina played their third qualifying round home match at Peristeri Stadium, Peristeri, instead of their regular stadium Zosimades Stadium, Ioannina.)
Attendance: 3,373
Referee: Robert Schörgenhofer (Austria)

AZ won 3–1 on aggregate.

28 July 2016
19:00

Jelgava (Latvia)	1–1	(Israel) Beitar Jerusalem
Smirnovs 70'	Report	Vered 25'

Skonto Stadium, Riga (Note: Jelgava played their third qualifying round home match at Skonto Stadium, Riga, instead of their regular stadium Olympic Sports Center of Zemgale, Jelgava.)
Attendance: 2,886
Referee: Georgi Kabakov (Bulgaria)
4 August 2016
19:00

Beitar Jerusalem (Israel)	3–0	(Latvia) Jelgava
Atzili 16' (pen.); Shechter 29'; Heister 47'	Report

Teddy Stadium, Jerusalem
Attendance: 16,175
Referee: Hugo Miguel (Portugal)

Beitar Jerusalem won 4–1 on aggregate.

28 July 2016
19:00

Austria Wien	0–1	(Slovakia) Spartak Trnava
	Report	Tambe 46'

Ernst-Happel-Stadion, Vienna (Note: Austria Wien played their home matches at Ernst-Happel-Stadion, Vienna, instead of their regular stadium Franz Horr Stadium, Vienna, due to reconstruction.)
Attendance: 6,835
Referee: Alexandru Tudor (Romania)
4 August 2016
18:30

Spartak Trnava (Slovakia)	0–1 (a.e.t.)	Austria Wien
	Report	Friesenbichler 88'
Penalties
Godál (penalty scored); Schranz (penalty scored); Sloboda (penalty scored); Jirka (penalty scored); Mikovič (penalty missed)	4–5	(penalty scored) Larsen; (penalty scored) Tajouri; (penalty scored) Kvasina; (penalty scored) Serbest; (penalty scored) Friesenbichler

Štadión Antona Malatinského, Trnava
Attendance: 17,152
Referee: Ivan Bebek (Croatia)

1–1 on aggregate; Austria Wien won 5–4 on penalties.

28 July 2016
20:00

Panathinaikos (Greece)	1–0	(Sweden) AIK
Moledo 79'	Report

Leoforos Alexandras Stadium, Athens
Attendance: 12,021
Referee: Bastian Dankert (Germany)
4 August 2016
19:00

AIK (Sweden)	0–2	(Greece) Panathinaikos
	Report	Ibarbo 46'; Berg 73'

Tele2 Arena, Stockholm (Note: AIK played their first and third qualifying rounds home matches at Tele2 Arena, Stockholm, instead of their regular stadium Friends Arena, Solna.)
Attendance: 15,175
Referee: Tony Chapron (France)

Panathinaikos won 3–0 on aggregate.

28 July 2016
20:00

Osmanlıspor (Turkey)	1–0	(Estonia) Nõmme Kalju
Pinto 74'	Report

Osmanlı Stadyumu, Ankara
Attendance: 8,634
Referee: Nikola Dabanović (Montenegro)
4 August 2016
18:00

Nõmme Kalju (Estonia)	0–2	(Turkey) Osmanlıspor
	Report	Çürüksu 4'; Delarge 29'

Kadriorg Stadium, Tallinn (Note: Nõmme Kalju played their home matches at Kadriorg Stadium, Tallinn, instead of their regular stadium Hiiu Stadium, Tallinn.)
Attendance: 2,235
Referee: Christian Dingert (Germany)

Osmanlıspor won 3–0 on aggregate.

28 July 2016
20:45

Aberdeen (Scotland)	1–1	(Slovenia) Maribor
Hayes 88'	Report	Novaković 83'

Pittodrie Stadium, Aberdeen
Attendance: 17,105
Referee: Tore Hansen (Norway)
4 August 2016
20:15

Maribor (Slovenia)	1–0	(Scotland) Aberdeen
Shinnie 90+3' (o.g.)	Report

Ljudski vrt, Maribor
Attendance: 9,796
Referee: Nikola Popov (Bulgaria)

Maribor won 2–1 on aggregate.

28 July 2016
19:00

Lille (France)	1–1	(Azerbaijan) Gabala
Mendes 47'	Report	Vernydub 13'

Stadium Lille Métropole, Villeneuve-d'Ascq (Note: Lille played their home match at Stadium Lille Métropole, Villeneuve-d'Ascq, instead of their regular stadium Stade Pierre-Mauroy, Villeneuve-d'Ascq.)
Attendance: 8,265
Referee: Daniel Stefański (Poland)
4 August 2016
19:00

Gabala (Azerbaijan)	1–0	(France) Lille
Ozobić 34'	Report

Bakcell Arena, Baku (Note: Gabala played their home matches at Bakcell Arena, Baku, instead of their regular stadium City Stadium, Qabala.)
Attendance: 10,550
Referee: Aleksei Eskov (Russia)

Gabala won 2–1 on aggregate.

28 July 2016
18:30

Oleksandriya (Ukraine)	0–3	(Croatia) Hajduk Split
	Report	Ćosić 53'; Erceg 82'; Ohandza 90'

CSC Nika Stadium, Oleksandriia
Attendance: 6,800
Referee: Gediminas Mažeika (Lithuania)
4 August 2016
20:30

Hajduk Split (Croatia)	3–1	(Ukraine) Oleksandriya
Nižić 21'; Sušić 52' (pen.), 56'	Report	Starenkyi 13'

Stadion Poljud, Split
Attendance: 25,000
Referee: John Beaton (Scotland)

Hajduk Split won 6–1 on aggregate.

28 July 2016
20:15

Hertha BSC (Germany)	1–0	(Denmark) Brøndby
Ibišević 28'	Report

Friedrich-Ludwig-Jahn-Sportpark, Berlin (Note: Hertha BSC played their home match at Friedrich-Ludwig-Jahn-Sportpark, Berlin, instead of their regular stadium Olympiastadion, Berlin.)
Attendance: 18,454
Referee: Kevin Blom (Netherlands)
4 August 2016
20:15

Brøndby (Denmark)	3–1	(Germany) Hertha BSC
Pukki 3', 34', 52'	Report	Ibišević 30'

Brøndby Stadium, Brøndbyvester
Attendance: 17,102
Referee: Paweł Gil (Poland)

Brøndby won 3–2 on aggregate.

28 July 2016
19:30

İstanbul Başakşehir (Turkey)	0–0	(Croatia) Rijeka
	Report

Başakşehir Fatih Terim Stadium, Istanbul
Attendance: 5,768
Referee: Svein-Erik Edvartsen (Norway)
4 August 2016
20:15

Rijeka (Croatia)	2–2	(Turkey) İstanbul Başakşehir
Bezjak 24', 50' (pen.)	Report	Višća 42', 74'

Stadion Rujevica, Rijeka (Note: Rijeka played their home match at Stadion Rujevica, Rijeka, instead of their regular stadium Stadion Kantrida, Rijeka, due to reconstruction.)
Attendance: 5,524
Referee: Marius Avram (Romania)

2–2 on aggregate; İstanbul Başakşehir won on away goals.

28 July 2016
18:45

Heracles Almelo (Netherlands)	1–1	(Portugal) Arouca
Gladon 53'	Report	González 90+1'

Polman Stadion, Almelo
Attendance: 11,670
Referee: Charalambos Kalogeropoulos (Greece)
4 August 2016
19:00

Arouca (Portugal)	0–0	(Netherlands) Heracles Almelo
	Report

Estádio Municipal, Arouca
Attendance: 2,750
Referee: Adrien Jaccottet (Switzerland)

1–1 on aggregate; Arouca won on away goals.

28 July 2016
19:00

Torpedo-BelAZ Zhodino (Belarus)	0–0	(Austria) Rapid Wien
	Report

Torpedo Stadium, Zhodzina
Attendance: 3,940
Referee: Þorvaldur Árnason (Iceland)
4 August 2016
21:05

Rapid Wien (Austria)	3–0	(Belarus) Torpedo-BelAZ Zhodino
Pavelić 26'; Schrammel 36'; Schaub 90+2'	Report

Allianz Stadion, Vienna
Attendance: 18,600
Referee: Roi Reinshreiber (Israel)

Rapid Wien won 3–0 on aggregate.

28 July 2016
20:00

Genk (Belgium)	1–0	(Republic of Ireland) Cork City
Bailey 31'	Report

Luminus Arena, Genk
Attendance: 7,765
Referee: Clayton Pisani (Malta)
4 August 2016
20:45

Cork City (Republic of Ireland)	1–2	(Belgium) Genk
Bennett 63'	Report	Buffel 13'; Dewaest 41'

Turners Cross, Cork
Attendance: 6,745
Referee: Kristo Tohver (Estonia)

Genk won 3–1 on aggregate.

28 July 2016
20:00

Shkëndija (North Macedonia)	2–0	(Czech Republic) Mladá Boleslav
Stênio Júnior 69'; Hasani 75'	Report

Philip II Arena, Skopje (Note: Shkëndija played their home matches at Philip II Arena, Skopje, instead of their regular stadium City Stadium, Tetovo.)
Attendance: 11,717
Referee: Artyom Kuchin (Kazakhstan)
4 August 2016
19:00

Mladá Boleslav (Czech Republic)	1–0	(North Macedonia) Shkëndija
Magera 82'	Report

Municipal Stadium, Mladá Boleslav
Attendance: 3,528
Referee: Simon Lee Evans (Wales)

Shkëndija won 2–1 on aggregate.

28 July 2016
20:45

Domžale (Slovenia)	2–1	(England) West Ham United
Črnic 11' (pen.), 49'	Report	Noble 18' (pen.)

Stožice Stadium, Ljubljana (Note: Domžale played their third qualifying round home match at Stožice Stadium, Ljubljana, instead of their regular stadium Sports Park, Domžale.)
Attendance: 8,458
Referee: Mete Kalkavan (Turkey)
4 August 2016
20:45

West Ham United (England)	3–0	(Slovenia) Domžale
Kouyaté 8', 25'; Feghouli 81'	Report

Olympic Stadium, London
Attendance: 53,914
Referee: Fredy Fautrel (France)

West Ham United won 4–2 on aggregate.

28 July 2016
20:30

Videoton (Hungary)	0–1	(Denmark) Midtjylland
	Report	Novák 55'

Pancho Arena, Felcsút (Note: Videoton played their home matches at Pancho Arena, Felcsút, instead of their regular stadium Sóstói Stadion, Székesfehérvár, due to reconstruction.)
Attendance: 2,899
Referee: Ville Nevalainen (Finland)
4 August 2016
18:00

Midtjylland (Denmark)	1–1 (a.e.t.)	(Hungary) Videoton
Novák 104'	Report	Kovács 75'

MCH Arena, Herning
Attendance: 6,258
Referee: Marco Guida (Italy)

Midtjylland won 2–1 on aggregate.

28 July 2016
19:00

IFK Göteborg (Sweden)	1–2	(Finland) HJK
Salomonsson 73'	Report	Tanaka 47'; Morelos 75'

Gamla Ullevi, Gothenburg
Attendance: 9,046
Referee: Kevin Clancy (Scotland)
4 August 2016
18:00

HJK (Finland)	0–2	(Sweden) IFK Göteborg
	Report	Boman 35'; Ankersen 82'

Sonera Stadium, Helsinki
Attendance: 10,107
Referee: Anatoliy Zhabchenko (Ukraine)

IFK Göteborg won 3–2 on aggregate.

28 July 2016
21:05

Admira Wacker Mödling (Austria)	1–2	(Czech Republic) Slovan Liberec
Knasmüllner 7'	Report	Vůch 11', 69'

Bundesstadion Südstadt, Maria Enzersdorf
Attendance: 2,245
Referee: Halis Özkahya (Turkey)
3 August 2016
18:00

Slovan Liberec (Czech Republic)	2–0	(Austria) Admira Wacker Mödling
Coufal 20'; Komlichenko 34' (pen.)	Report

Stadion u Nisy, Liberec
Attendance: 6,125
Referee: Radu Petrescu (Romania)

Slovan Liberec won 4–1 on aggregate.

28 July 2016
20:30

Gent (Belgium)	5–0	(Romania) Viitorul Constanța
Mitrović 16'; Coulibaly 37', 50'; Depoitre 56'; Neto 66'	Report

Ghelamco Arena, Ghent
Attendance: 12,332
Referee: Stephan Klossner (Switzerland)
4 August 2016
20:15

Viitorul Constanța (Romania)	0–0	(Belgium) Gent
	Report

Stadionul Viitorul, Ovidiu
Attendance: 1,294
Referee: Carlos del Cerro Grande (Spain)

Gent won 5–0 on aggregate.

28 July 2016
19:45

Grasshopper (Switzerland)	2–1	(Cyprus) Apollon Limassol
Tabaković 11'; Lavanchy 90+3'	Report	Guié Guié 76'

Kybunpark, St. Gallen (Note: Grasshopper played their third qualifying round home match at Kybunpark, St. Gallen, instead of their regular stadium Letzigrund, Zürich, which is booked for a Bruce Springsteen concert.)
Attendance: 2,330
Referee: Andris Treimanis (Latvia)
4 August 2016
19:00

Apollon Limassol (Cyprus)	3–3 (a.e.t.)	(Switzerland) Grasshopper
Paulo Vinícius 73'; Papoulis 87'; Guié Guié 101'	Report	Andersen 77'; Caio 103'; Gjorgjev 120+1'

GSP Stadium, Nicosia (Note: Apollon Limassol played their home match at GSP Stadium, Nicosia, instead of their regular stadium Tsirion Stadium, Limassol.)
Attendance: 5,887
Referee: Andre Marriner (England)

Grasshopper won 5–4 on aggregate.

== Play-off round ==
=== Summary ===
The first legs were played on 17 and 18 August, and the second legs were played on 25 August 2016.

Team 1	Agg.	Team 2	1st leg	2nd leg
Astana (Kazakhstan)	4–2	(Belarus) BATE Borisov	2–0	2–2
Arouca (Portugal)	1–3	(Greece) Olympiacos	0–1	1–2 (a.e.t.)
Midtjylland (Denmark)	0–3	(Turkey) Osmanlıspor	0–1	0–2
Trenčín (Slovakia)	2–4	(Austria) Rapid Wien	0–4	2–0
Lokomotiva Zagreb (Croatia)	2–4	(Belgium) Genk	2–2	0–2
AEK Larnaca (Cyprus)	0–4	(Czech Republic) Slovan Liberec	0–1	0–3
Dinamo Tbilisi (Georgia (country))	0–5	(Greece) PAOK	0–3	0–2
Austria Wien	4–2	(Norway) Rosenborg	2–1	2–1
Beitar Jerusalem (Israel)	1–2	(France) Saint-Étienne	1–2	0–0
Vojvodina (Serbia)	0–3	(Netherlands) AZ	0–3	0–0
Gabala (Azerbaijan)	3–2 (Note: Order of legs reversed after original draw.)	(Slovenia) Maribor	3–1	0–1
Slavia Prague (Czech Republic)	0–6	(Belgium) Anderlecht	0–3	0–3
Astra Giurgiu (Romania)	2–1	(England) West Ham United	1–1	1–0
Fenerbahçe (Turkey)	5–0	(Switzerland) Grasshopper	3–0	2–0
Panathinaikos (Greece)	4–1	(Denmark) Brøndby	3–0	1–1
Krasnodar (Russia)	4–0	(Albania) Partizani	4–0	0–0
Gent (Belgium)	6–1	(North Macedonia) Shkëndija	2–1	4–0
İstanbul Başakşehir (Turkey)	1–4	(Ukraine) Shakhtar Donetsk	1–2	0–2
SønderjyskE (Denmark)	2–3	(Czech Republic) Sparta Prague	0–0	2–3
Sassuolo (Italy)	4–1	(Serbia) Red Star Belgrade	3–0	1–1
IFK Göteborg (Sweden)	1–3	(Azerbaijan) Qarabağ	1–0	0–3
Maccabi Tel Aviv (Israel)	3–3 (4–3 p)	(Croatia) Hajduk Split	2–1	1–2 (a.e.t.)

=== Matches ===
18 August 2016
16:00

Astana (Kazakhstan)	2–0	(Belarus) BATE Borisov
Kabananga 70'; Nurgaliev 80'	Report

Astana Arena, Astana
Attendance: 17,536
Referee: Sébastien Delferière (Belgium)
25 August 2016
20:00

BATE Borisov (Belarus)	2–2	(Kazakhstan) Astana
Gordeichuk 27'; Stasevich 89' (pen.)	Report	Maksimović 50'; Twumasi 76'

Borisov Arena, Barysaw
Attendance: 9,516
Referee: Tony Chapron (France)

Astana won 4–2 on aggregate.

18 August 2016
21:00

Arouca (Portugal)	0–1	(Greece) Olympiacos
	Report	Sebá 27'

Estádio Municipal, Arouca
Attendance: 1,950
Referee: Slavko Vinčić (Slovenia)
25 August 2016
20:45

Olympiacos (Greece)	2–1 (a.e.t.)	(Portugal) Arouca
Domínguez 94'; Ideye 113'	Report	Gegé 80'

Karaiskakis Stadium, Piraeus
Attendance: 18,348
Referee: Aleksei Eskov (Russia)

Olympiacos won 3–1 on aggregate.

18 August 2016
18:30

Midtjylland (Denmark)	0–1	(Turkey) Osmanlıspor
	Report	Banggaard 20' (o.g.)

MCH Arena, Herning
Attendance: 7,003
Referee: István Kovács (Romania)
25 August 2016
20:00

Osmanlıspor (Turkey)	2–0	(Denmark) Midtjylland
Pinto 20', 50'	Report

Osmanlı Stadyumu, Ankara
Attendance: 12,116
Referee: Yevhen Aranovsky (Ukraine)

Osmanlıspor won 3–0 on aggregate.

18 August 2016
21:05

Trenčín (Slovakia)	0–4	(Austria) Rapid Wien
	Report	Schaub 32', 54', 83'; Schwab 73'

Štadión pod Dubňom, Žilina (Note: Trenčín played their home match at Štadión pod Dubňom, Žilina, instead of their regular stadium Štadión na Sihoti, Trenčín.)
Attendance: 4,069
Referee: Stefan Johannesson (Sweden)
25 August 2016
21:05

Rapid Wien (Austria)	0–2	(Slovakia) Trenčín
	Report	Lawrence 12'; Paur 35'

Allianz Stadion, Vienna
Attendance: 21,200
Referee: Aleksandar Stavrev (Macedonia)

Rapid Wien won 4–2 on aggregate.

18 August 2016
20:00

Lokomotiva Zagreb (Croatia)	2–2	(Belgium) Genk
Marić 52' (pen.); Fiolić 59'	Report	Bailey 35' (pen.); Samatta 47'

Stadion Maksimir, Zagreb
Attendance: 1,700
Referee: Tamás Bognár (Hungary)
25 August 2016
20:00

Genk (Belgium)	2–0	(Croatia) Lokomotiva Zagreb
Samatta 2'; Bailey 50'	Report

Luminus Arena, Genk
Attendance: 8,166
Referee: John Beaton (Scotland)

Genk won 4–2 on aggregate.

18 August 2016
19:00

AEK Larnaca (Cyprus)	0–1	(Czech Republic) Slovan Liberec
	Report	Coufal 29'

Antonis Papadopoulos Stadium, Larnaca
Attendance: 4,645
Referee: Ruddy Buquet (France)
25 August 2016
19:00

Slovan Liberec (Czech Republic)	3–0	(Cyprus) AEK Larnaca
Sýkora 8', 15', 41'	Report

Stadion u Nisy, Liberec
Attendance: 7,570
Referee: Ivan Bebek (Croatia)

Slovan Liberec won 4–0 on aggregate.

18 August 2016
18:00

Dinamo Tbilisi (Georgia (country))	0–3	(Greece) PAOK
	Report	Matos 20'; Crespo 71'; Pereyra 83'

Boris Paichadze Dinamo Arena, Tbilisi
Attendance: 12,006
Referee: Liran Liany (Israel)
25 August 2016
20:00

PAOK (Greece)	2–0	(Georgia (country)) Dinamo Tbilisi
Rodrigues 5'; Tzavellas 45'	Report

Toumba Stadium, Thessaloniki
Attendance: 14,821
Referee: Harald Lechner (Austria)

PAOK won 5–0 on aggregate.

18 August 2016
19:00

Austria Wien	2–1	(Norway) Rosenborg
Grünwald 51'; Pires 53'	Report	Reginiussen 90+1'

Ernst-Happel-Stadion, Vienna
Attendance: 6,090
Referee: Benoît Bastien (France)
25 August 2016
19:00

Rosenborg (Norway)	1–2	Austria Wien
Gytkjær 59' (pen.)	Report	Grünwald 58'; Kayode 69'

Lerkendal Stadion, Trondheim
Attendance: 11,692
Referee: Martin Atkinson (England)

Austria Wien won 4–2 on aggregate.

17 August 2016
18:00

Beitar Jerusalem (Israel)	1–2	(France) Saint-Étienne
Vered 8'	Report	Lemoine 15'; Rueda 30' (o.g.)

Teddy Stadium, Jerusalem
Attendance: 25,049
Referee: Michael Oliver (England)
25 August 2016
20:45

Saint-Étienne (France)	0–0	(Israel) Beitar Jerusalem
	Report

Stade Geoffroy-Guichard, Saint-Étienne
Attendance: 20,354
Referee: Matej Jug (Slovenia)

Saint-Étienne won 2–1 on aggregate.

18 August 2016
20:00

Vojvodina (Serbia)	0–3	(Netherlands) AZ
	Report	Wuytens 32', 83'; Friday 45+2'

Karađorđe Stadium, Novi Sad
Attendance: 10,493
Referee: Paolo Tagliavento (Italy)
25 August 2016
20:00

AZ (Netherlands)	0–0	(Serbia) Vojvodina
	Report

AFAS Stadion, Alkmaar
Attendance: 8,401
Referee: Tobias Stieler (Germany)

AZ won 3–0 on aggregate.

18 August 2016
19:00

Gabala (Azerbaijan)	3–1	(Slovenia) Maribor
Zenjov 37'; Dabo 50', 52'	Report	Tavares 17'

Bakcell Arena, Baku
Attendance: 4,723
Referee: Aleksei Kulbakov (Belarus)
25 August 2016
20:15

Maribor (Slovenia)	1–0	(Azerbaijan) Gabala
Tavares 66'	Report

Ljudski vrt, Maribor
Attendance: 9,000
Referee: Viktor Kassai (Hungary)

Gabala won 3–2 on aggregate.

18 August 2016
19:00

Slavia Prague (Czech Republic)	0–3	(Belgium) Anderlecht
	Report	Sylla 49'; Teodorczyk 60'; Hanni 71'

Eden Arena, Prague
Attendance: 16,096
Referee: Martin Strömbergsson (Sweden)
25 August 2016
20:00

Anderlecht (Belgium)	3–0	(Czech Republic) Slavia Prague
Tielemans 22' (pen.); Teodorczyk 40' (pen.); Heylen 61'	Report

Constant Vanden Stock Stadium, Brussels
Attendance: 13,075
Referee: Anthony Taylor (England)

Anderlecht won 6–0 on aggregate.

18 August 2016
20:15

Astra Giurgiu (Romania)	1–1	(England) West Ham United
Alibec 83'	Report	Noble 45' (pen.)

Stadionul Marin Anastasovici, Giurgiu
Attendance: 3,360
Referee: Artur Soares Dias (Portugal)
25 August 2016
20:45

West Ham United (England)	0–1	(Romania) Astra Giurgiu
	Report	Teixeira 45'

Olympic Stadium, London
Attendance: 56,932
Referee: Manuel Gräfe (Germany)

Astra Giurgiu won 2–1 on aggregate.

18 August 2016
20:00

Fenerbahçe (Turkey)	3–0	(Switzerland) Grasshopper
Chahechouhe 4'; Stoch 72', 90+1'	Report

Şükrü Saracoğlu Stadium, Istanbul
Attendance: 16,280
Referee: Robert Schörgenhofer (Austria)
25 August 2016
19:00

Grasshopper (Switzerland)	0–2	(Turkey) Fenerbahçe
	Report	Fernandão 77'; Stoch 84'

Letzigrund, Zürich
Attendance: 14,400
Referee: Danny Makkelie (Netherlands)

Fenerbahçe won 5–0 on aggregate.

18 August 2016
20:00

Panathinaikos (Greece)	3–0	(Denmark) Brøndby
Berg 45+2', 82'; Ledesma 54' (pen.)	Report

Leoforos Alexandras Stadium, Athens
Attendance: 11,072
Referee: István Vad (Hungary)
25 August 2016
19:00

Brøndby (Denmark)	1–1	(Greece) Panathinaikos
Mukhtar 35'	Report	Ivanov 66'

Brøndby Stadium, Brøndbyvester
Attendance: 13,521
Referee: Oliver Drachta (Austria)

Panathinaikos won 4–1 on aggregate.

18 August 2016
18:30

Krasnodar (Russia)	4–0	(Albania) Partizani
Joãozinho 18' (pen.); Smolov 27'; Jędrzejczyk 45'; Krasniqi 73' (o.g.)	Report

Kuban Stadium, Krasnodar
Attendance: 11,575
Referee: Gediminas Mažeika (Lithuania)
25 August 2016
19:30

Partizani (Albania)	0–0	(Russia) Krasnodar
	Report

Elbasan Arena, Elbasan (Note: Partizani played their first qualifying and play-off rounds home matches at Elbasan Arena, Elbasan, instead of their regular stadium Selman Stërmasi Stadium, Tirana.)
Attendance: 1,550
Referee: Jakob Kehlet (Denmark)

Krasnodar won 4–0 on aggregate.

18 August 2016
20:30

Gent (Belgium)	2–1	(North Macedonia) Shkëndija
Matton 45+2'; Coulibaly 90+2'	Report	Ibraimi 9'

Ghelamco Arena, Ghent
Attendance: 13,416
Referee: Serhiy Boyko (Ukraine)
25 August 2016
20:00

Shkëndija (North Macedonia)	0–4	(Belgium) Gent
	Report	Coulibaly 60', 69'; Perbet 81'; Neto 86'

Philip II Arena, Skopje
Attendance: 30,252
Referee: Luca Banti (Italy)

Gent won 6–1 on aggregate.

18 August 2016
19:30

İstanbul Başakşehir (Turkey)	1–2	(Ukraine) Shakhtar Donetsk
Belözoğlu 56' (pen.)	Report	Cikalleshi 24' (o.g.); Kovalenko 41'

Başakşehir Fatih Terim Stadium, Istanbul
Attendance: 3,016
Referee: Xavier Estrada Fernández (Spain)
25 August 2016
21:00

Shakhtar Donetsk (Ukraine)	2–0	(Turkey) İstanbul Başakşehir
Attamah 22' (o.g.); Marlos 71' (pen.)	Report

Arena Lviv, Lviv (Note: Shakhtar Donetsk played their home match at Arena Lviv, Lviv, instead of their regular stadium, the Donbas Arena in Donetsk, due to the war in Donbas.)
Attendance: 7,014
Referee: Ivan Kružliak (Slovakia)

Shakhtar Donetsk won 4–1 on aggregate.

18 August 2016
18:15

SønderjyskE (Denmark)	0–0	(Czech Republic) Sparta Prague
	Report

Sydbank Park, Haderslev
Attendance: 4,795
Referee: Hüseyin Göçek (Turkey)
25 August 2016
20:00

Sparta Prague (Czech Republic)	3–2	(Denmark) SønderjyskE
Lafata 44'; Šural 69'; Brabec 85'	Report	Uhre 35'; Kløve 40'

Generali Arena, Prague
Attendance: 13,685
Referee: Bobby Madden (Scotland)

Sparta Prague won 3–2 on aggregate.

18 August 2016
20:45

Sassuolo (Italy)	3–0	(Serbia) Red Star Belgrade
Berardi 17'; Politano 41'; Defrel 69'	Report

Mapei Stadium – Città del Tricolore, Reggio Emilia
Attendance: 6,861
Referee: Serdar Gözübüyük (Netherlands)
25 August 2016
20:30

Red Star Belgrade (Serbia)	1–1	(Italy) Sassuolo
Katai 54'	Report	Berardi 28'

Red Star Stadium, Belgrade
Attendance: 22,314
Referee: David Fernández Borbalán (Spain)

Sassuolo won 4–1 on aggregate.

18 August 2016
19:00

IFK Göteborg (Sweden)	1–0	(Azerbaijan) Qarabağ
Albæk 56'	Report

Gamla Ullevi, Gothenburg
Attendance: 11,458
Referee: Paweł Raczkowski (Poland)
25 August 2016
18:30

Qarabağ (Azerbaijan)	3–0	(Sweden) IFK Göteborg
Sadygov 19'; Muarem 26'; Quintana 51'	Report

Tofiq Bahramov Republican Stadium, Baku (Note: Qarabağ played their home match at Tofiq Bahramov Republican Stadium, Baku, instead of their regular stadium Azersun Arena, Baku.)
Attendance: 25,500
Referee: Vladislav Bezborodov (Russia)

Qarabağ won 3–1 on aggregate.

18 August 2016
19:00

Maccabi Tel Aviv (Israel)	2–1	(Croatia) Hajduk Split
Alberman 9'; Scarione 77'	Report	Said 56'

Netanya Stadium, Netanya
Attendance: 9,932
Referee: Jesús Gil Manzano (Spain)
25 August 2016
20:30

Hajduk Split (Croatia)	2–1 (a.e.t.)	(Israel) Maccabi Tel Aviv
Ćosić 40', 59'	Report	Scarione 52'
Penalties
Vlašić (penalty scored); Tudor (penalty missed); Ohandza (penalty missed); Gentsoglou (penalty scored); Sušić (penalty scored); Ćosić (penalty missed)	3–4	(penalty scored) Yitzhaki; (penalty missed) Ben Haim I; (penalty missed) Scarione; (penalty scored) Sá; (penalty scored) Medunjanin; (penalty scored) Rikan

Stadion Poljud, Split
Attendance: 21,102
Referee: Felix Zwayer (Germany)

3–3 on aggregate; Maccabi Tel Aviv won 4–3 on penalties.
